= New Zealand Challenge =

Career
- Yacht club: Royal New Zealand Yacht Squadron ('87); Mercury Bay Boating Club ('88-'92)
- Established: 1987
- Nation: New Zealand
- Team principal(s): Michael Fay

Yachts
- Sail no.: Boat name
- KZ–7: KZ 7
- KZ–1: KZ1
- NZL-20: NZL 20

New Zealand Challenge was a sailing team funded by Michael Fay that challenged for the America's Cup three times between 1987 and 1992. New Zealand Challenge was the first team from New Zealand to enter the competition.

== 1987: KZ 7 Kiwi Magic ==
New Zealand entered the America's Cup competition in 1984, when Marcel Fachler, a Belgian then living in Sydney, entered as a challenger following Australia II's victory. Later the campaign's director, former government minister Anthony "Aussie" Malcolm, brought in Michael Fay to help organize and finance the challenge.

The team made use of former US 12 Meter Enterprise (now registered as KZ–1). The 1986 12 Meter Championships were staged off Fremantle as a precursor to the America's Cup event to be held a year later. KZ 7's sister boats KZ 3 and KZ 5 competed, with KZ 5 finishing runner-up behind the Bond Syndicate's Australia III, which was the comfortable winner. The boat finished ahead of the New York yacht club entry America II, a considerable achievement that made the sailing community stand-up and take notice that the New Zealand challenge was serious.

KZ 3 and KZ 5 had been built identically and information gained from racing KZ 3 and KZ 5 went into the planning of KZ 7. All three were designed by Farr Yacht Design, and comprised the first successful efforts of Bruce Farr in America's Cup Racing. Skippered by Chris Dickson, the crew included: Brad Butterworth, Ed Danby, Simon Daubney, Brian Phillimore, Mike Quilter, Tony Rae, Jeremy Scantlebury, Kevin Shoebridge, Andrew Taylor and Erle Williams.

In 1986 off Fremantle, Australia, KZ 7 was the most dominant boat in the Louis Vuitton Cup rounds robin competition, winning 33 of 34 starts. In the Semi's she swept French Kiss 4 races to nil, and reached the Louis Vuitton Cup Finals, where she lost to Dennis Conner and Stars & Stripes 87.

Despite failing to reach the America's Cup as the challenger yacht, the Kiwi challenge drew great attention through their fast boat and capable sailing.

KZ 7 later competed in the 1987 World Championships in Sardinia, Italy, with David Barnes as skipper and Rod Davis as tactician. The New Zealanders sailed competitively, and ended up winning the event in the protest room, achieving victory over the Japanese entry Bengal (previously the Bond syndicate's Australia III).

== 1988: Big Boat Challenge ==
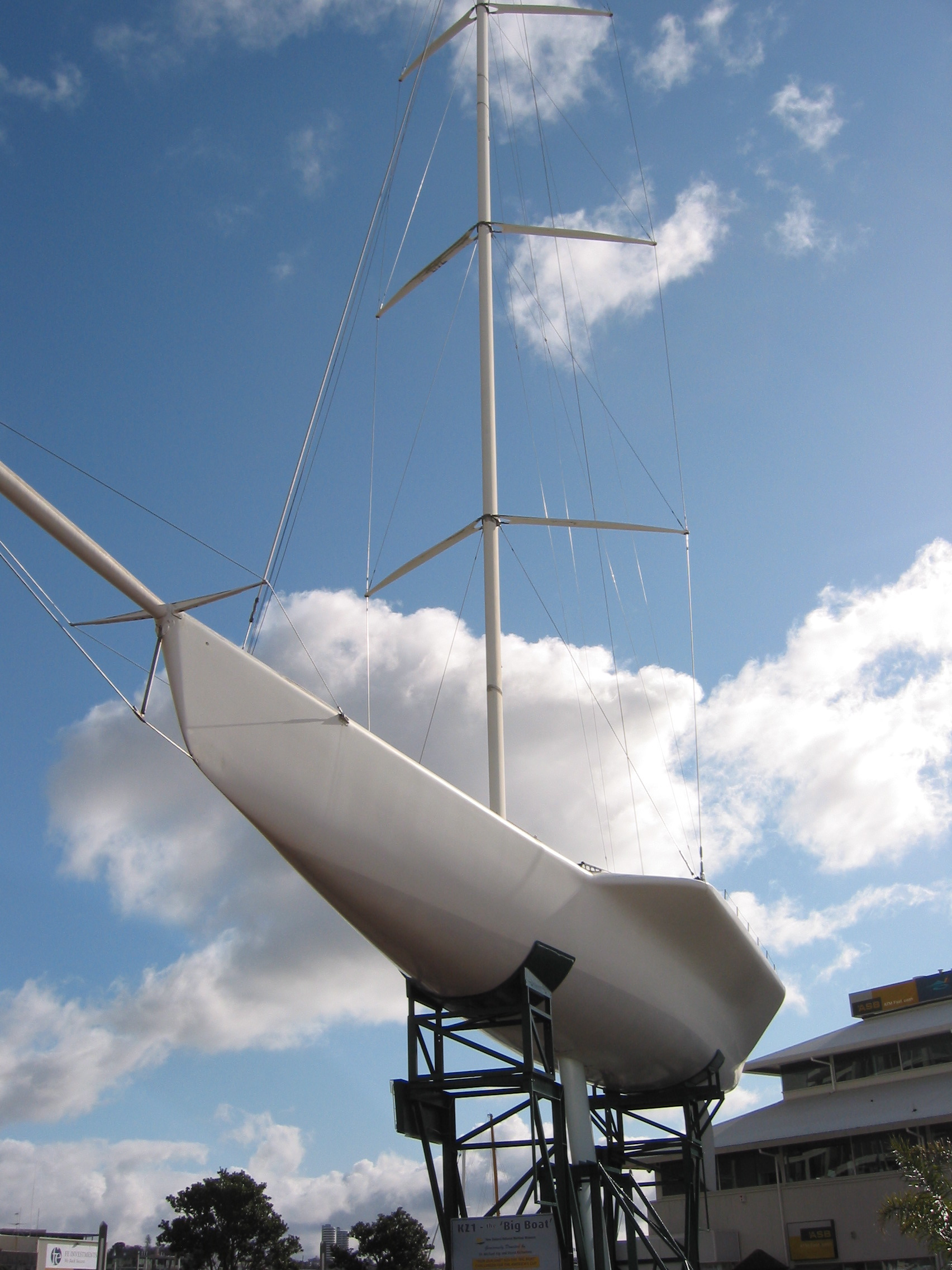
KZ1 on display

Five months after the completion of the Royal Perth Yacht Club's America's Cup competition, Fay issued a challenge to San Diego Yacht Club. Using a strict reading of the Deed of Gift, Fay realized he could challenge with any yacht that was 90 feet (27 m) or less at the waterline and require the defending yacht club to meet him in ten months time. He worked with designer Bruce Farr and Tom Schnackenberg to build a gigantic monohull called New Zealand or KZ 1. The boat was built by Steve Martin in Mt Wellington, Auckland and was launched on 27 March 1988.

Skippered by David Barnes with tactician Peter Lester, she was the maximum 23.47 m (77.0 ft) along the waterline, and was said to be the fastest monohull keelboat in the world at the time. However, as the Deed of Gift was being used to force the competition, San Diego Yacht Club responded by taking advantage of the vague wording of the Deed and built a catamaran, Stars & Stripes (US 1), for the defense. Conner and his catamaran easily beat the big boat, KZ 1, 2–0 in the Deed of Gift races.

Fay challenged this outcome in court, claiming the defenders were "not sporting" in sailing a catamaran against his big boat. He won the initial ruling, but the finding of the lower court was overturned on appeal, and the outcome on the water was made to stand. The appellate court decision was then upheld when Fay pressed the issue before the New York State Court of Appeals.

KZ 1 can still be seen in the Viaduct Harbour, outside the entrance to the New Zealand National Maritime Museum in Auckland, New Zealand.

== 1992: Bowsprit Scandal ==
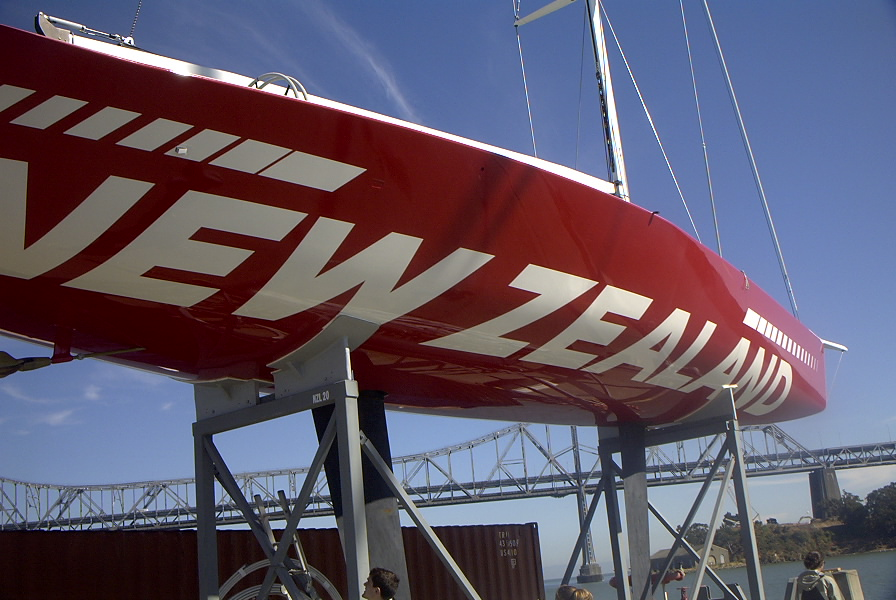
NZL 14, a trial boat for the 1992 challenge

Fay challenged again in 1992 with the distinctively red NZL 20. In competition, New Zealand Challenge had another outstanding effort, and progressed through the regatta to the finals of the Louis Vuitton Cup where they faced Paul Cayard and the Italian syndicate of Il Moro di Venezia. Leading 4–1 in the series, a protest from Il Moro over NZL 20's use of a bowsprit was upheld. The result of the protest was that Team New Zealand was docked one of its race wins (bringing the series score back to 3–1) and was required to remove the bowsprit. The New Zealand team never recovered from the enforced changes and blow to morale, losing the next 4 races and the series.

Managed by Peter Blake, the team was skippered by Rod Davis and NZL 20's crew included tactician David Barnes, bow Alan Smith; mid-bow David Brooke; mast Barry McKay; pit Denis Kendall; floater Mark Hauser; grinders Andrew Taylor and Sean Clarkson; genoa trimmers Kevin Shoebridge and Grant Loretz; mainsheet traveler Don Cowie; mainsheet trimmer Simon Daubney; and running backstays Tony Rae and Peter Evans. Russell Coutts sailed the second boat.

== Aftermath ==
Following the 1992 challenge Fay declined to fund another attempt. Two teams entered the 1995 Louis Vuitton Cup in their place, Team New Zealand, representing the Royal New Zealand Yacht Squadron, and Tag Heuer Challenge, representing the Tutukaka South Pacific Yacht Club. Team New Zealand won the America's Cup on their first attempt.
