= 1995 Louis Vuitton Cup =

Sailing competition

4th Louis Vuitton Cup
Event information
- Type: Challenge race for America's Cup
- Dates: 12 January 1995 – 21 April 1995
- Boats: Team New Zealand oneAustralia; Sydney 95; Spanish Challenge (Spain); France America 95; Nippon Challenge (Japan); Tag Heuer Challenge

Results
- Winner: Team New Zealand

Succession
- Previous: 1995 Louis Vuitton Cup
- Next: 2000 Louis Vuitton Cup

The 4th Louis Vuitton Cup was held in San Diego, United States in 1995. The winner, Team New Zealand, went on to challenge for and win the 1995 America's Cup.

== The teams ==
Originally ten challengers from seven nations submitted bids to compete for the 1995 Louis Vuitton Cup. However Il Moro di Venezia collapsed after the death of its director Raul Gardini. The Challenger of Record Committee then eliminated a Russian bid after it missed several deadlines and the French challenge representing Yacht Club d'Antibes withdrew even though its yacht Harmony was almost completed.

Club	Team	Skipper	Yachts
Royal New Zealand Yacht Squadron	Team New Zealand	(New Zealand) Russell Coutts	NZL-32 & NZL-38
(Australia) Southern Cross Yacht Club	oneAustralia	(Australia) John Bertrand	AUS-31 & AUS-35
Cruising Yacht Club of Australia	Sydney 95	(Australia) Syd Fischer	AUS-29
(Spain) Monte Real Club de Yates de Bayona	Spanish Challenge	(Spain) Pedro Campos Calvo-Sotelo	ESP-42
(France) Yacht Club de Sète	France America 95	(France) Marc Pajot	FRA-33 & FRA-37
(Japan) Nippon Yacht Club	Nippon Challenge	(Japan) Makoto Namba	JPN-30 & JPN-41
(New Zealand) Tutukaka South Pacific Yacht Club	Tag Heuer Challenge	(New Zealand) Chris Dickson	NZL-39

=== Team New Zealand ===
Team New Zealand represented the Royal New Zealand Yacht Squadron and was headed by Peter Blake. The skipper was Russell Coutts and the crew included Brad Butterworth, Tom Schnackenberg, Murray Jones, Tony Rae, Kevin Shoebridge and Craig Monk.

The team was the second challenge from the Royal New Zealand Yacht Squadron but built on the work of three previous challengers since 1987. Co-designed by Doug Peterson and Laurie Davidson, their boat showed a significant jump forward in speed. In sea trials against New Zealand's 1992 entry, NZL-20, a very good boat at the 1992 Cup, the new black boat easily outpaced it. Recalled boat Doug Peterson, "That first day Brad Butterworth came back and said, 'My god, it's like a different class of boat.' " The team finished with an official record of 41–2 and led 93% of the 260 legs it competed in.

=== One Australia ===
One Australia was skippered by John Bertrand, the winner of the 1983 America's Cup. The syndicate won the 1994 IACC World Championship with AUS-31. AUS-35 was then constructed through a partnership agreement with the Australian Challenge – a deal that, it was claimed, violated the two boats per syndicate rule. However the boat was allowed to compete in the 1995 Louis Vuitton Cup. She performed well until halfway through her match race of 5 March 1995, when it suddenly broke in half in heavy seas and sank within two minutes. She was the first America's Cup contender ever (144 years) to lose a match race by shipwreck. The crew survived, and reverted to their second boat, AUS-31 for the rest of the regatta. They still made the Louis Vuitton Cup final, where they lost to Team New Zealand 5–1.

The crew included Adam Beashel, navigator Andrew Cape, Iain Murray, Matt Mitchell, Billy Bates, Mark Richards, Alan Smith, Don McCracken and Rod Davis. The backup helmsman was David Barnes

=== Sydney 95 ===
The Syd Fischer challenge from Sydney, this was Fischer's fourth America's Cup entrant. The team made frequent changes to its afterguard during the Cup and finished with a 5–19 record, finishing last on points. The crew included Chris Law and mainsail trimmer and tactician Neal McDonald.

=== Spanish Challenge ===
Copa America '95 Desafio Español was the last team to arrive in San Diego. The team was restrained financially and could not build on the 1992 campaign. The team only had one boat, ESP-42, and finished with a 3–21 record.

=== France America 95 ===
From Yacht Club de Sete and skippered by Marc Pajot, France America '95 failed to live up to expectations in 1995. France 2 (FRA-33) was damaged while it was being launched in December 1994 and then the keel fell off in February while it was testing a new sail. France 3 (FRA-37) was then demasted in the last round robin. The crew included Bertrand Pacé, Jan Dekker, Yann Gouniot, Christian Karcher and Bernard Labro, and Harold Cudmore was an advisor.

=== Nippon Challenge ===
Nippon Challenge built on the 1992 campaign to enter two teams in the 1994 IACC World Championships and have a strong team in the 1995 Cup. Nippon had a 9–9 record sailing with JPN-30 before finishing the round robin in JPN-41 with a 2–4 record. Nippon Challenge then went 0–11 in the Semi finals to finish with an 11–24 overall record. The helmsman was John Cutler and the crew included Peter Evans, Chris Mason and Guy Barron.

=== Tag Heuer Challenge ===
Tutukaka Challenge was run on a shoe string budget that saw the team nearly not make it to San Diego until the intervention of Tag Heuer. The team was led by Chris Dickson and the crew included Peter Lester, Mike Sanderson, Kelvin Harrap, Gavin Brady, Grant Loretz, Chris Salthouse, Brad Webb, and Denis Kendall. The team finished with a 24–12 record, making the semi-finals.

== Round robin ==
Four round robin series (RR1-RR4) were held. During Round Robin 1 a team scored 1 point per win, during RR2 a team scored 2 points per win, during RR3 a team scored 4 points per win and during RR4 a team scored 5 points per win.

Team name	Races	Won	RR1 Pts.	RR2 Pts.	RR3 Pts.	RR4 Pts.	Total Pts.	Ranking
Team New Zealand	24	23	6	10	24	30	70	1
One Australia	24	17	3	10	20	20*	53	2
(New Zealand) Tag Heuer Challenge	24	17	5	8	16	20	49	3
(Japan) Nippon Challenge	24	11	4	6	8	10	28	4
France America '95	24	8	1	6	8	10	25	5
(Spain) Spanish Challenge	24	3	0	0	4	10	14	6
(Australia) Sydney 95	24	5	2	2	4	5	13	7

*One Australia's boat AUS-35 sunk when racing Team New Zealand during RR4 and they were left with only AUS-31.

== Finals ==
=== Semi finals ===
Team name	Races	Won	Ranking
Team New Zealand	11	9	1
One Australia	11	7	2
(New Zealand) Tag Heuer Challenge	11	6	3
(Japan) Nippon Challenge	11	0	4

=== Final ===
Team Name	1	2	3	4	5	6	7	8	9	T
Team New Zealand	W (4:55)	W (1:57)	W (2:26)	L	W (3:04)	W (2:13)	-	-	-	5
One Australia	L	L	L	W (0:15)	L	L	-	-	-	1
