= Andrew Taylor (sailor) =

New Zealand sailor

Andrew Taylor (born 22 July 1963) is a New Zealand sailor who has competed in multiple Whitbread Round the World Races and America's Cups.

Taylor sailed the 1985–86 Whitbread Round the World Race on Lion New Zealand before joining New Zealand Challenge. He sailed on KZ 7 at the 1987 Louis Vuitton Cup and on KZ 1 during the 1988 America's Cup.

Taylor then sailed in the 1989–90 Whitbread Round the World Race on Fisher & Paykel NZ. He re-joined New Zealand Challenge for the 1992 Louis Vuitton Cup.

Taylor then joined Team New Zealand and was a grinder on board NZL 32 when they won the 1995 Louis Vuitton Cup and 1995 America's Cup. He then sailed in Team New Zealand's successful defence of the 2000 America's Cup. He was the only person to sail in every New Zealand America's Cup campaign to this point.

He joined the American OneWorld Challenge for the 2003 Louis Vuitton Cup. With Rohan Lord, he placed ninth in the 2004 Star World Championships, before joining Luna Rossa Challenge for the 2007 Louis Vuitton Cup.
