= P-class yacht =

In boating, P-class could refer to either of:

- a development class for racing yachts under the Universal Rule devised in 1902 by Nathanael Herreshoff for America's Cup racing
- a class of sailing dinghy developed in New Zealand in 1923 by Harry Highet
