= Wind (1992 film) =

1992 American film by Carroll Ballard

- Theatrical release poster
- Directed by: Carroll Ballard
- Screenplay by: Mac Gudgeon; Rudy Wurlitzer
- Story by: Jeff Benjamin; Kimball Livingston; Roger Vaughan
- Produced by: Tom Luddy; Mataichiro Yamamoto
- Starring: Matthew Modine; Jennifer Grey; Stellan Skarsgård; Rebecca Miller; Cliff Robertson; Jack Thompson
- Cinematography: John Toll
- Edited by: Michael Chandler
- Music by: Basil Poledouris
- Production company: American Zoetrope
- Distributed by: TriStar Pictures
- Release date: September 11, 1992
- Running time: 126 minutes
- Country: United States
- Language: English
- Budget: $29 million
- Box office: $5,519,569 (US)

Wind is a 1992 American sports drama film directed by Carroll Ballard and starring Matthew Modine, Jennifer Grey and Cliff Robertson.

The film is centered on the America's Cup series of yachting races and uses them as a backdrop for both an action/adventure and a romantic storyline.

== Plot ==
Competitive sailor Will Parker is given an opportunity with his colleague Charley to join the crew of Radiance, a 12-metre-class racing yacht set to defend the United States's century-plus-held title in the America's Cup. Despite her having retired from racing to finish a master's degree in aeronautical engineering, Will asks his lover and sailing partner Kate Bass to go with him, but she declines.

Radiance owner and skipper Morgan Weld selects Will to captain the American Eagle against them in practice, and Will is introduced to Weld's daughter, Abigail. Weld limits Will's equipment and crew, leaving them at a competitive disadvantage. Kate, now with her degree, arrives to sail with Will in an International 14 race, which they nearly win. Despite a job offer, Kate agrees when Will asks her to serve as his tactician. The Eagle beats Weld. Will is promoted to helmsman and tactician on the Radiance but is told to remove Kate.

At the America's Cup Final, the Boomerang, an Australian boat under the command of Jack Neville, forces a decisive seventh race, challenging the American dominance. A lead in the race by Radiance is jeopardized by a problem with the mast and an aggressive move by Weld. Will helms the boat into a tight turn around the marker signifying the second half of the race. However, Weld reclaims the wheel, causing them to hit the marker, requiring them to completely circle the marker before moving forward. Weld's reluctance to follow Will's advice allows the Australians to win the race. Will is blamed for the loss.

Six months later, Will visits Kate at a small town and airfield in Nevada. She is working with aerodynamic designer Joe Heiser, with whom she is romantically involved. Joe suggests they build a boat together, ostensibly as a means to gain exposure to fund his own aircraft research. Will visits Weld to convince him to finance the new boat, but Weld does not believe Will has what it takes to win. Will sleeps with Abigail, and they commiserate on being disappointments to Weld.

Abigail travels to Nevada to be with Will and offer money for the project. When she learns she has less than originally thought, she uses her connections to find funding. Will calls in Charley and the Radiance crew to build the boat, as Kate designs and fashions a new large spinnaker called the "Whomper" aerodynamically engineered to increase speed. While Abigail and Joe leave to secure the money, Will and Kate reconnect and he admits that he still loves her.

The new boat, named Geronimo, wins its way into the next America's Cup in Fremantle, Australia. With Will as skipper and Charley as tactician, they have Neville and his new boat, the Platypus, up against the ropes with a 3-2 advantage and a lead in the sixth race. However, Charley's ill-advised direction leads to a collision that breaks the mast and spear of Platypus and a melee between the two crews. Ahead of a protest committee meeting, Will contends Neville could have steered clear to avoid the accident but also that he and his crew were wrong, conceding the race.

Preparing for the final race, Will gives Neville a new mast, prompting Abigail to fire him in favor of Charley. Weld arrives, revealing he secretly funded the project, and attempts to commandeer the boat for his crew to race. The Geronimo crew rallies behind Will, who asks Kate to be his tactician.

During the race, Geronimo and Platypus are dead in the water with no wind until Kate finds a patch that allows them to pull ahead, the Australians now in pursuit. As they pass the marker, Geronimo's spinnaker tears. While replacing it with another, a crew member is dragged into the water, slowing the boat. The Australians gain a significant lead. Kate suggests they use the Whomper, which enables them to catch up. As they try to pass, Neville uses the spear of Platypus to rip the sail. Neville's lead keeps Geronimo in a wind shadow that prevents them from gaining distance. With Kate's guidance, Will out-tacks Neville. Geronimo grabs the lead, wins the race, and reclaims the title for the United States.

== Cast ==
- Matthew Modine as Will Parker
- Jennifer Grey as Kate Bass
- Cliff Robertson as Morgan Weld
- Jack Thompson as Jack Neville
- Stellan Skarsgård as Joe Heiser
- Rebecca Miller as Abigail Weld
- Ned Vaughn as Charley Gaines

== Production ==
The film was inspired by the New York Yacht Club's loss of the 1983 America's Cup through the events of the 1987 America's Cup. Several of the 12-metre class yachts that participated in Cup races were used in the movie.

America's Cup skipper Peter Gilmour, whose aggressive sailing during the 1987 defender selection series earned himself a place on the defender boat for the America's Cup, was "Sailing Master" for the film. He was on board for all of the sailing sequences, controlled the boat while they were flying the "Whomper", and can be seen in many of the boat scenes, surreptitiously laying a hand on the opposite wheel. Lisa Blackaller, daughter of America's Cup skipper Tom Blackaller, acted as sailing double for Jennifer Grey for the small boat races in the International 14 class at Newport.

American Eagle (US 21), the red 12 Meter ocean endurance champion sailed to fame by Ted Turner in the mid-seventies, was used as the trial horse sailed by Will Parker in preparation for the America's Cup. The boat had been a finalist in the 1964 Defender selection series but lost the selection to Constellation. The 12-meter yachts depicting the America's Cup races were the more modern boats from the America II Syndicate, America II (US 42) and America II (US 46). The boat repainted as Boomerang and later as Platypus was depicted by US 42, and Radiance and then later Geronimo were depicted by US 46. US 46 had been sailed by John Kolius in the 1987 Louis Vuitton Challenger Selection Cup races.

Many of the film's port scenes were filmed on location in and around Newport, Rhode Island, with the sailing scenes of the International 14's competition and the America's Cup races filmed off Perth in Western Australia. Parts of the film were also shot in Green River, Wendover, and the Bonneville Salt Flats in Utah. Shooting took twelve weeks, beginning on 25 February 1991.

New Zealand's long time America's Cup commentator Peter Montgomery also lent his voice to the simulated television coverage of all Cup races in the film.

== Soundtrack ==
The soundtrack is available on CD from BSX Records. The score was composed and conducted by Basil Poledouris and performed by the Hollywood Studio Symphony. Also included on the same CD is the soundtrack to the 1981 television movie A Whale for the Killing, also composed by Poledouris.

== Reception ==
Wind holds a 46% rating on Rotten Tomatoes, based on 13 reviews, and an average rating of 6/10.

"I have always thought of the America’s Cup as an event where rich people in blue blazers sit around getting drunk and eating chowder, while weird-looking sailboats are manned by beach bums trying to make their aging millionaire skippers look good. “Wind,” a new movie about the America’s Cup races, does not altogether dispel my notion, but it places the focus out on the water instead of ashore, and it contains some of the most exciting sailing footage I can imagine."

— Roger Ebert

=== Box office ===
Wind grossed $96,798 at the box office in Australia. The movie flopped at the US box office.

== See also ==
- Cinema of Australia
