= 1987 Louis Vuitton Cup =

Sailing Cup held in Fremantle, Western Australia

2nd Louis Vuitton Cup
Event information
- Type: Challenge race for America's Cup
- Dates: 5 October 1986 – 23 January 1987
- Host city: Fremantle, Western Australia
- Boats: US Merchant Marine Academy Foundation (United States); Heart of America Challenge (United States); American Eagle Foundation (United States); Golden Gate Foundation (United States); Sail America Foundation (United States); Courageous Challenge (United States); Azzurra (Italy); Italia (Italy); Secret Cove/True North challenge (Canada); New Zealand Challenge; British America's Cup Challenge (United Kingdom)

Results
- Winner: Stars and Stripes (United States)

Succession
- Previous: 1983 Louis Vuitton Cup
- Next: 1992 Louis Vuitton Cup

The 2nd Louis Vuitton Cup was held in Fremantle, Western Australia in 1987. The winner, Stars & Stripes, went on to challenge for and win the 1987 America's Cup.

== Teams ==
Twelve syndicates from six countries (Canada, France, Italy, New Zealand, the United Kingdom and the United States) competed in 25 boats for the right to challenge. A further two syndicates entered but failed to compete in the Cup itself. The first syndicates arrived in Fremantle in 1984 with most having established a presence by late 1985 for the 1986 12-Metre World Championships.

It was estimated that the foreign syndicates spent $200M in the challenge efforts.

Club	Team	Skipper	Yachts
(United States) New York Yacht Club	US Merchant Marine Academy Foundation	(United States) John Kolius	America II (US-42, US-44 & US-46)
(United States) Chicago Yacht Club	Heart of America Challenge	(United States) Buddy Melges	Heart of America (US 51), Clipper (US 32)
(United States) Newport Harbor Yacht Club	American Eagle Foundation	(United States) Rod Davis	Eagle (US 60), Magic (US 38)
(United States) St. Francis Yacht Club	Golden Gate Foundation	(United States) Tom Blackaller	USA I (US 49), USA II (US 61)
(United States) San Diego Yacht Club	Sail America Foundation	(United States) Dennis Conner	Liberty (US 40), Stars & Stripes 83 (US 36), Stars and Stripes 85 (US 54), Stars and Stripes 86 (US 56) and Stars and Stripes 87 (US 55)
(United States) Yale Corinthian Yacht Club	Courageous Challenge	(United States) David Vietor	Courageous IV (US 26)
(Italy) Yacht Club Costa Smeralda	Azzurra	(Italy) Lorenzo Bortolotti	Azzurra I (I-4), Azzurra II (I-8), Azzurra III (I-10), Azzurra IV (I-11)
(Italy) Yacht Club Italiano	Italia	(Italy) Flavio Scala & Aldo Migliaccio	Victory 83 (I 6), Italia I (I 7) & Italia II (I 9)
(France) Société des Régates Rochelaises	Challenge Kis France	(France) Marc Pajot	Freedom (US 30), Enterprise (US 27), French Kiss (F 7)
(France) Société Nautique de Marseilles	Marseilles Syndicate	(France) Yves Pajot	Challenge 12 (F 5), France 3 (F 3), Challenge France (F 4)
(Canada) Royal Nova Scotia Yacht Squadron & Secret Cove Yacht Club	Secret Cove/True North challenge	(Canada) Terry Neilson	True North, Canada I/Canada II (KC 1)
Royal New Zealand Yacht Squadron	New Zealand Challenge	(New Zealand) Chris Dickson	New Zealand (KZ 3), New Zealand (KZ 5) and New Zealand (KZ 7)
(United Kingdom) Royal Thames Yacht Club	British America's Cup Challenge	(Republic of Ireland) Harold Cudmore	White Crusader I (K 24) & White Crusader II (K 25)

=== US Merchant Marine Academy Foundation (USA) ===
The syndicate from New York Yacht Club was the first foreign syndicate to arrive at Fremantle in 1984. It had two 12-Metre boats, US-42 and US-44 (both named America II) sailing in the following year, skippered by John Kolius. A third sister boat, US-46 arrived shortly after. The challenge cost the NYYC $15M.

Kolius later resigned and was replaced by John Bertrand and Tom McLaughlin. Lexi Gahagan was the navigator.

=== Heart of America Challenge (USA) ===
Heart of America was from the Chicago Yacht Club and used 1980 defender candidate Clipper as a trial horse. After receiving commercial support from the Chrysler Corporation the team built Heart of America (US 51) to sail in the Cup. Because of concerns about the "arm of the sea" clause of the Deed of Gift of the America's Cup, the Royal Perth Yacht Club requested and received an interpretive ruling from the New York Supreme Court to allow a challenge from a club based on the Great Lakes. The boat was skippered by Buddy Melges and included Bill Shore, Larry Mialik, Andreas Josenhans, Jim Gretzky, Wally Henry, John Stanley, Fred Stritt and Dave Dellenbaugh.

=== Eagle Foundation (USA) ===
From the Newport Harbor Yacht Club, the Eagle syndicate was based in Newport Harbor, California. The skipper was Rod Davis and designer was Johan Valentijn. The syndicate purchased Magic, a 1983 light displacement Johan Valentijn design, and retrofitted the vessel with a Joop Sloof designed wing keel similar to Australia II. Magic was fitted with Optim data acquisition equipment and extensively tested in Newport, Rhode Island. Data from these tests, large scale model testing and design assistance from Boeing, and Chrysler senior engineers resulted in Johan Valentijn's design Eagle. This 12 meter was close in size to Liberty, but due to a very low center of gravity winged keel design was optimised for Fremantle conditions. Eagle was shipped to Perth while Magic remained in the United States of America.

The crew included Doug Rastello and Jim Allsopp.

=== Golden Gate Challenge (USA) ===
The Golden Gate Challenge by the St Francis Yacht Club, was the first America's Cup Challenge by the city of San Francisco. Its mayor Dianne Feinstein lead a council of 60 Bay Area mayors to build regional support. The Challenge built two new yachts. The first, built by Stephens Marine in Stockton, California, was a conventional 12-meter boat code named "E-I" (for evolutionary one) (12/US-49) with a winged keel. The second yacht, built by Derecktor Shipyards in Mamaroneck, New York, dubbed "R-1" (for revolutionary one)(12/US-61). Nicknamed "USA-61", the yacht introduced two major innovations. The first was that R-1's classic trim tab was moved from the trailing edge of the keel to the front of the boat and renamed the bow rudder. These twinned rudders could be operated in either the collective mode, where the rudders turned in unison, or the cyclical mode, where the rudders turned in opposite directions. Steering the bow rudder from the stern cockpit presented the engineers with a mechanical challenge and the helmsman with a steep learning curve. R-1 was fastest in smooth water because the bow rudder stayed submerged. Unfortunately, the 20+ knots of breeze and 5–6 foot waves on the race course offshore of Fremantle, Australia didn't provide ideal conditions for the world's first bow-ruddered boat. Competitors smiled whenever they saw R-1's bow rudder come out of the water in the steep waves of Freo. On the other hand, R-1s second innovation was its very narrow keel. It was just 19 inches, fore and aft, with an elongated ellipsoid bulb made of 47,000 pounds of lead (known as the geek) on the bottom edge. While the bow rudder was seldom imitated, the bulb keel has endured and been copied by virtually all racing monohulls since its introduction on this boat. The management team was composed of Cyril Magnin, Honorary Chairman; Bob Scott, Founder and chairman; Bob Cole, Vice Chair; Tom Blackaller, President and Skipper; Ron Young, General Manager and Development; Gary Mull, Naval Architect; Heiner Meldner, Hydrodynamicist; Alberto Calderon, Aerodynamicist; Ken Keeke, Director Onshore Operations. The crew: Tom Blackaller, Skipper; Paul Cayard, Tactician; Craig Healy, Navigator; Stevie Erickson, Mainsail Trimmer; Russ Silvestri, Hank Stuart and Jim Plagenhoef Jib and Spinnaker Trimmers; Brad Lewis, Mikey Erlin and Jeff Littfin Grinders; Kenny Keefe, Pit; Bruce Epke, Mastman/Sewerman; Tom Ducharme, Scott Easom, Scott Inveen, Bowmen. Both boats were named "USA". Tom had skippered "Defender" in the 1983 America's Cup, with Paul Cayard as tactician and Peter Stalkus as navigator.

=== Sail America Foundation (USA) ===
After the 1983 loss, Dennis Conner found sponsors and built a syndicate to challenge for the America's Cup. Based at San Diego Yacht Club, the syndicate made use of Conner's 1983 America's Cup defender Liberty (US 40) and refit the 1982 built Spirit of America (US 34), re-commissioning her as Stars and Stripes 83 (US 53). In addition, they commissioned the building of three new boats: Stars and Stripes 85 (US 54), Stars and Stripes 86 (US 56) and Stars and Stripes 87 (US 55). Conner practiced for the Fremantle conditions by training in Hawaii, taking the three new boats with him down to Fremantle to compete for the Cup.

Tom Whidden was the tactician, Peter Isler the navigator and the crew included Scott Vogel, Kyle Smith, Jon Wright, Jay Brown, Adam Ostenfeld, Jim Kavle, Henry Childers, Bill Trenkle and John Barnitt.

=== Courageous Challenge (USA) ===
From the Yale Corinthian Yacht Club, sailing Courageous, winner of the America's Cup in 1974 and 1977. The boat had been heavily redesigned and updated to make her more competitive for the 1987 campaign. Unfortunately she was largely outclassed by the competition, winning just one race (over Challenge France) but losing to the major contenders by eight to ten minutes an outing. The team withdrew from the Cup before the end of the first round.

The afterguard included Dave Vietor, Warwick Tomkins and Mike Buonvino.

=== Consorzio Italia (Italy) ===
From Yacht Club Italiano, the Consorzio Italia syndicate was backed by Gucci. The syndicate was inspired by the success of Azzurra in 1983 and began by purchasing Victory '83 to give them a bench mark. The boats were skippered by Flavio Scala and Aldo Migliaccio, with Italophile Rod Davis in the afterguard alongside Tommaso Chieffi and Stefano Roberti. Italia II was seriously damaged during its launch but was repaired in time for the Cup.

=== Azzurra (Italy) ===
Azzurra was the challenger of record for 1987. From the Yacht Club Costa Smeralda and backed by the Aga Khan, the syndicate eventually had four boats at its disposal. Azzurra I (I-4) competed in the 1983 Louis Vuitton Cup at Newport. Then Azzurra II (I-8) managed to come fifth in the 1986 World Championships, a disappointing result which prompted the construction of two new boats, Azzurra III (I-10) and IV (I-11), from competing designers. The skipper was Olympian Mauro Pelaschier with support from Tiziano Nava, Matteo Plazzi, and Francesco de Angelis.

=== Challenge Kis France (France) ===
From the Societe des Regates Rochelaise yacht club, the Challenge Kis France was skippered by Marc Pajot and included Marc Bouet and Bertrand Pacé. The boat performed well, winning the second and seventh race in the World Championship series. The syndicate was owned by French businessman, Serge Crasnianski who invested $10 million in the challenge. He later estimated that the venture may have cost his company as much as $70 million in lost revenue. His company, KIS France developed an instant photo development system in 1981 which cornered 60 percent of the world photo laboratory market. The RPYC challenged the legality of the French Kiss name, claiming that it was too commercial being associated with the KIS photo-labs. However, the name was subsequently cleared by an international jury.

=== Marseilles Syndicate (France) ===
The Societe Nautique de Marseilles challenge began with the purchase of France 3 and Challenge 12 and the confirmation of skipper Yves Pajot, brother of Marc Pajot (French Kiss syndicate skipper). Both twelves were then sailed in Fremantle. However, soon after the construction of Challenge France that the syndicates financial position became known, and it was in deep financial difficulty. The afterguard included Francois Brenac.

=== New Zealand Challenge (New Zealand) ===
Originally backed by Marcel Fachler, and later Michael Fay, the team consisted of several Fibreglass boats designed by Ron Holland, Bruce Farr and Laurie Davidson. KZ 3 and KZ 5 were built identically and KZ 7 was then developed after further testing and editing. Skippered by Chris Dickson, the crew were: Brad Butterworth, Ed Danby, Simon Daubney, Brian Phillimore, Mike Quilter, Tony Rae, Jeremy Scantlebury, Kevin Shoebridge, Andrew Taylor and Erle Williams.

David Barnes was the alternative skipper and the crew included Warwick Fleury, Alan Smith, and Ross Halcrow.

=== Secret Cove/TrueNorth (Canada) ===
A combined challenge from Canada's Secret Cove Yacht Club and Royal Nova Scotia Yacht Squadron. True North performed well in the World Championships and was heavily modified afterwards. Canada I was designed by Bruce Kirby and became Canada II after being heavily redesigned before the event began. The two teams merged after both were unable to attract the big name sponsors needed for a serious challenge. After extensive training, only Canada II was sent to Fremantle. Skippered by Terence Neilson, the crew included Hans Fogh and Andy Roy.

=== British America's Cup Challenge (United Kingdom) ===
From the Royal Thames Yacht Club, White Crusader was designed by Ian Howlett and was a traditional 12-metre design evolved from the DeSavery Victory'83 boat of the previous America's Cup event. However, White Crusader II was a radical design and designed by David Hollam. This second boat was used as a trial horse against White Crusader, but the team eventually decided to use the more conventional designed boat. Tank testing was carried out at Southampton University and HMS Haslar. The deadline for acceptance of challenges was 1 April 1986 and Admiral Sir Ian Easton wrote his own personal cheque for $16,000 as an entry fee deposit. Harold Cudmore acted as skipper-tactician and starting helmsman who then handed over the helm to Chris Law for the remainder of each races. Eddie Warden-Owen was the navigator. Both boats were originally named simply Crusader One and Two but the "White" part of their names were added when millionaire Graham Walker (Of White Horse whiskey fame) gave heavy sponsorship to the British challengers at the last minute before the event started so the "White" was added to their names.

== Rounds Robin ==
The regatta was staged in three rounds robin stages. Later stages awarded a greater number of points than earlier ones an attempt to reward the fastest boats at the end of the series. The four fastest boats were then placed in an elimination series to select the challenger. The first round robin, which took place on 5-20 October, saw America II of the New York Yacht Club, Stars and Stripes 87 and KZ 7, which was the surprise of the regatta, finish with 11–1 records. The second round, on 2-19 November, saw Stars & Stripes struggle. Conner's boat was optimized for heavy airs, and suffered from a shortage of sails for lighter breezes. When a spell of Easterlies settled over Western Australia she was caught out of her element and dropped four races. She lost to Tom Blackaller and USA in 5 to 10 knot winds, and the following day to the Kiwis, even though the breeze had picked up to 22 knots. On the ninth day she lost again to the British team White Crusader in 4 to 6 knots breeze, and the following day to Canada II, whom she had led around the final mark but was caught out when the breeze died away. The Kiwis continued to dominate the regatta, winning every one of their eleven match races, while America II continued to make a strong showing with a 9–2 record. The third round (2-19 December) saw a change in fortunes. America II simply was unable to continue to improve her speed, while other boats were making improvements and getting faster. She struggled to a 6–5 record in the final round. A strong initial performance simply was not enough by the third round, and their loss to KZ 7 placed them out of the running for the Semis. The loss meant the New York Yacht Club was eliminated for the first time in Cup history. USA with her unique design was finally showing her potential, as Tom Blackaller became better versed in handling the boat with the forward canard or rudder. Marc Pajot's French Kiss upset America II and found her way into the Semis.

Challenger	Races	Won	Loss	Points
New Zealand	34	33	1	198
(United States) Stars & Stripes	34	27	7	154
(United States) USA	34	23	11	139
(France) French Kiss	34	20	14	129
(United States) America II	34	26	8	128
(United Kingdom) White Crusader	34	21	13	115
(Italy) Italia	34	17	17	99
Canada II	34	15	19	79
(United States) Heart of America	34	11	23	73
(United States) Eagle	34	10	24	48
(Italy) Azzurra	34	4	30	23
Challenge France	30	2	28	2
(United States) Courageous	12	1	11	1

== Knock-out stage ==
Semi-finals
(New Zealand) KZ 7	4
(France) French Kiss	0
(United States) USA	0
(United States) Stars & Stripes 87	4

Final
(New Zealand) KZ 7	1
(United States) Stars & Stripes 87	4

=== Semi-finals ===
KZ 7 was the top qualifier of the round robins, followed in the points competition by Stars & Stripes 87, USA and French Kiss. In the Challenger semi-finals (28 December – 7 January) KZ 7 easily defeated French Kiss 4–0, with none of the races closely contested. Meanwhile, a far more spirited competition between Stars and Stripes 87 and USA ensued, with USA leading all of the first race till the final mark. In the end though Tom Blackaller couldn't quite find the speed he was looking for constantly, and the result was Stars and Stripes 87 winning the semi 4–0.

=== Final ===
Going into the Louis Vuitton Finals (13-23 January), Kiwi Magic was the favorite. She was a fast boat in both light and heavy air, had beaten Stars and Stripes 87 twice, and had won thirty-seven of thirty-eight match races. However, Stars & Stripes 87 was showing her best form of the regatta, particularly in heavy winds above 20 knots.

The first two races were similar, with Stars & Stripes going out to an early lead in the opening beat to the first windward mark, and then holding that lead throughout the remainder of the rest, holding ground on the downwind legs and extending it on the beats. The third race started out much as the previous two, with both boats taking a long tack out to the left hand side of the course in what Dennis Conner termed a "speed test". Stars & Stripes 87 rounded the first windward mark 26 seconds ahead, and that is when trouble started. The snap shackle failed causing the spinnaker to drop into the sea. The New Zealanders closed the gap, gibing back and forth across Conner's stern until they achieved what they were looking for, an inside overlap on the bottom mark. With right of way KZ-7 was able to slide ahead on the turn about the mark. Once there the New Zealanders proved a difficult boat to get past. On the second beat to windward they kept the American boat at bay with a tight cover. No room was available to get by on the reaching legs. But the third beat was one for the records books. Conner threw 55 tacks at the Dickson and his boat plus two false tacks in an effort to break free. The New Zealanders covered them all in one of the most exhausting and tense beats to windward in America's Cup history. The fourth race saw a complete turn in fortune, as now KZ 7 experienced a number of uncommon structural failures which snowballed due to the actions of the skipper and crew, the result being Kiwi Magic blowing her backstay in an abrupt gibe, losing to Stars & Stripes by 3 minutes 38 seconds. The fifth race was extremely competitive, with Stars & Stripes taking the initial lead on the first windward leg as she did in the first four races, but on the second beat to windward her Number 6 genoa blew to pieces and the Kiwis closed the gap. All hands went forward to clear the wreckage and hoist the Number 7 genoa, and Stars & Stripes held on to the slimmest of leads throughout the next four legs. Rounding the final mark she held a six-second lead, but here Dickson made one of the rare mistakes of his summer and struck the mark, forcing KZ 7 to round again and ending all hope they had of winning the race. Stars & Stripes 87 took the series, four wins to one. Perhaps Michael Fay summed up their effort best:

"We did the best we could. We couldn't beat the other guy on the day, and we've got to shake his hand and say 'Well done' because that's what happened. They did a very good job and they beat us."

Added Chris Dickson: "The best boat won. Thirteen years beat thirteen months experience. Congratulations guys."

Following the completion of the race, Gianfranco Alberini, Commodore, Yacht Club Costa Smeralda, the Challenge Club of Record responsible for organizing the challenger selection process had at last completed his responsibilities.

"We have concluded today two hundred and twenty three races. It was quite an historic performances, and I think it will go down in the Guinness records. Two hundred twenty three races, very successful for sure, selecting the two best yachts for the finals of the Louis Vuitton Cup, and the best challenger for the America's Cup 87."

Team	I	II	III	IV	V	Pts
(United States) Stars & Stripes	W	W	0	W	W	4
New Zealand	0	0	W	0	0	1
