= White Crusader =

Yacht

- Yacht club: Royal Thames Yacht Club
- Nation: United Kingdom
- Class: 12-metre
- Sail no: K–24

Racing career
- AC Challenger Selection Series: 1987

White Crusader is a 12-Meter yacht designed by Ian Howlett and built by Cougar Marine, Southampton for the 1987 Louis Vitton Cup 12-Meter race series. The winner would have the right to challenge Alan Bond's syndicate and the Royal Perth Yacht Club for the 1987 America's Cup in Fremantle, Western Australia.

The 12-Meter racing yacht White Crusader began life named as Crusader and was renamed after a £1 million pound advertising investment by British businessman Graham Walker of White Horse Whisky fame who added the word White to the boat's name as part of the sponsorship deal.

The America's Cup potential challenger was officially named by HRH Diana, Princess of Wales at the 1985 Earls Court Boat Show, London.

White Crusader competed in the 1987 Louis Vuitton Cup in Australia.

Onboard leadership for the challenge was the skipper Harold Cudmore and his tactician was Chris Law.

The British campaign built two boats - White Crusader (K-24) which was a traditional design and White Crusader 2 (K-25) which was a radical design by David Hollom.

The more radical boat was used as a trial horse by the British so that White Crusader could have competition to train against whilst in preparation for the Louis Vuitton challenger series.

During the series White Crusader was modified with several new keel designs and at one point the bow section was replaced with a higher freeboard design for the rough Fremantle sea conditions.

White Crusader met fierce opposition mainly from Chris Dickson with the New Zealand entry Kiwi Magic KZ-7 and Dennis Conner in Stars and Stripes 87 US-55, the latter winning the series and in due course the America's Cup itself from the Australians.

Since 1993 K-24 has reverted to her original name of Crusader. The boat is owned by Richard Matthews and has been moored at Ipswich on the River Orwell. The boat has been refitted since the America's Cup challenge and has competed in several Fastnet Races.
