= Simon Daubney =

New Zealand sailor (born 1959)

Simon Leslie Daubney
Personal information
- Full name: Simon Leslie Daubney
- Nationality: New Zealand
- Born: 17 July 1959 (age 67) Christchurch, New Zealand

Sailing career
- Sport: Sailing
- Classes: Soling, America's Cup
- Updated on 23 July 2023

Simon Leslie Daubney (born 17 July 1959) is a New Zealand sailor who has sailed in the Olympics and is a member of the America's Cup Hall of Fame.

== Early life ==
Daubney was born in Christchurch, New Zealand, in 1959.

== Olympic career ==
Daubney sailed for New Zealand at the 1984, 1988 and 1992 Summer Olympics. In 1984 he sailed in a Soling alongside Tom Dodson and Aran Hansen and they placed 11th. At the 1988 Olympics the same crew placed 7th. He competed with Russell Coutts and Graham Fleury in the 1992 Olympics, placing 8th. He is New Zealand Olympian number 425.

== America's Cup ==
Daubney sailed for New Zealand Challenge on KZ 7 during the 1987 Louis Vuitton Cup. He was the mainsheet trimmer for New Zealand Challenge at the 1992 Louis Vuitton Cup.

He was a trimmer on NZL 32 during Team New Zealand's 1995 America's Cup victory and 2000 America's Cup defence.

Daubney then joined Alinghi and was part of their 2003 America's Cup victory. He was a trimmer during the successful 2007 America's Cup defence. In 2007 Daubney tested positive for a recreational drug, but an America's Cup jury found that there was no fault or negligence and he was not sanctioned. The decision was appealed by the World Anti-Doping Agency, and in January 2009, the Court of Arbitration for Sport (CAS) imposed a backdated two-year ban that lasted until July 2009.

Daubney then sailed on Alinghi 5 in the 2010 America's Cup loss. In 2010 he was inducted into the America's Cup Hall of Fame.

Daubney joined Oracle Racing and was part of the crew that sailed in the 2011–13 America's Cup World Series.
