= Mike Quilter =

New Zealand sailor

Mike Quilter is a New Zealand sailor who has competed in six America's Cup and five Volvo Ocean Races.

During the 1983 America's Cup, Quilter worked as a sail maker under sail co-ordinator Tom Schnackenberg on Australia II's successful campaign.

He sailed on board Lion New Zealand in the 1985–86 Whitbread Round the World Race before joining the New Zealand Challenge as the navigator for KZ 7 at the 1987 America's Cup.

He later sailed as navigator on Steinlager 2 in the 1989–90 Whitbread Round the World Race, NZ Endeavour in 1993–94, Merit Cup in 1997–98 and Team Tyco in the renamed 2001–02 Volvo Ocean Race. He was involved as a designer with Team New Zealand when they won the 1995 America's Cup.

He also sailed on board Club Med during 2000's The Race.
