= Mark Paterson (sailor) =

New Zealand sailor (1947–2022)

Personal information
- Full name: William Henry Mark Paterson
- Born: 24 September 1947 Auckland, New Zealand
- Died: 5 August 2022 (aged 74)
- Height: 1.78 m (5 ft 10 in)

Sport
- Country: New Zealand
- Sport: Sailing
- Club: Kohimarama Yacht Club
Medal record
Sailing
Representing New Zealand
Cherub World Championships
| Gold medal – first place | 1978 Milford | Open |
| Bronze medal – third place | 1974 Torquay | Open |
470 World Championships
| Bronze medal – third place | 1977 Shizuoka | Open |

William Henry Mark Paterson (24 September 1947 – 5 August 2022) was a New Zealand sailor. He finished fifth in the 470 event at the 1976 Summer Olympics, and won the Cherub World Championship in 1978.

== Biography ==
Paterson was born in Auckland on 24 September 1947, and began sailing at the Kohimarama Yacht Club when he was 10 years old. He came to national attention aged 13, when he won the Tanner Cup as the national youth P-class champion, raced at Gisborne. He went on to retain the Tanner Cup in 1962 and 1963. He also won the Tauranga Cup as national P-Class champion in both 1961 and 1963, and finished second in 1962.

In 1968, Paterson won the Interdominion OK dinghy championship in Sydney. He was a member of the New Zealand team at the 1970 World OK Dinghy Championship, raced off Takapuna.

Paterson skippered yachts in four 470 World Championships. In 1974 and 1975, he sailed with Brett Bennett, finishing 51st and 35th, respectively. At the 1977 and 1979 470 World Championships, Paterson was joined by crewman David Mackay, and they placed third in 1977 and 31st in 1979.

Paterson and Bennett represented New Zealand in the 470 class at the 1976 Summer Olympics. They were leading the competition before the final race of the regatta, but placed fifth overall after finishing 16th in the deciding race.

At the 1974 Cherub World Championship in Torquay, England, Paterson and Bennett finished third. In 1978, Paterson and David Mackay won the Cherub World Championship, raced off Milford on Auckland's North Shore.

In 1979, Paterson and Mackay won the 470 class at the rehearsal event for the 1980 Summer Olympics in Tallinn. However, the pair were unable to compete in the Olympic regatta the following year because of the 1980 Summer Olympics boycott.

Paterson worked as a pharmacist, and bought a pharmacy in the Auckland suburb of Meadowbank in 1988. He died on 5 August 2022 at the age of 74.
