= Beashel =

Beashel is a surname. Notable people with the surname include:

- Adam Beashel, Australian sailor
- Colin Beashel (born 1959), Australian sailor
