= John Barnitt =

American sailor

John Barnitt is an American sailor who has competed in multiple America's Cups.

From Minneapolis, Barnitt was on Liberty when it lost the 1983 America's Cup and then sailed as the mastman on Stars & Stripes 87 during the 1987 Louis Vuitton Cup. He again sailed for Stars & Stripes when they defended the 1988 America's Cup.

He later joined Alinghi and was on board when they won the 2003 America's Cup. He rejoined Alinghi as their sports director in 2008, helping them prepare for the 2010 America's Cup.
