= Steinlager 2 =

Yacht

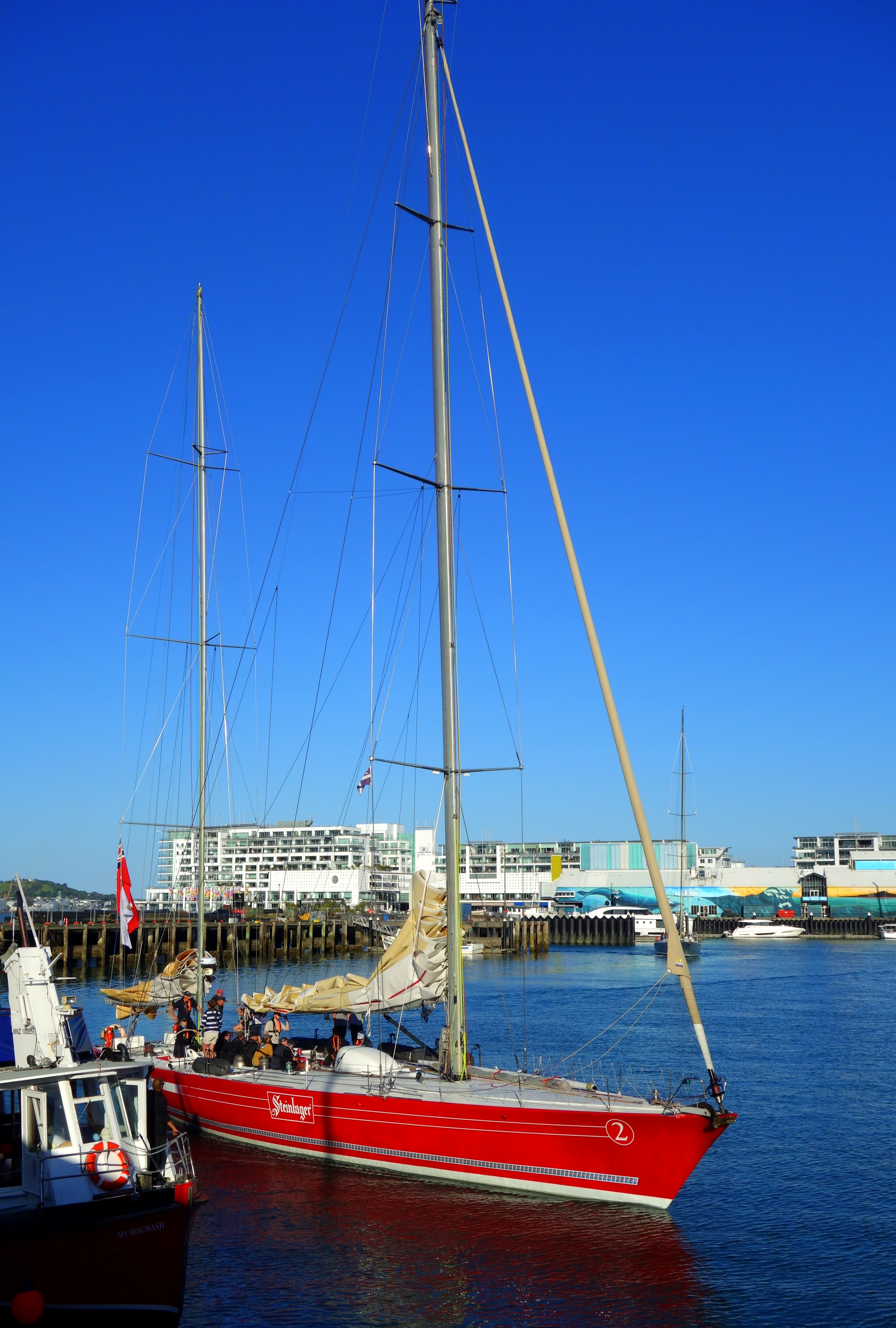
- Steinlager 2
- Nation: New Zealand
- Designer(s): Bruce Farr
- Builder: Southern Pacific Boatyard
- Owner(s): NZ Sailing Trust

Racing career
- Skippers: Peter Blake
- Notable victories: 1989–90 Whitbread; 1989 Fastnet Race (l.h.)

Specifications
- Displacement: 35,177 kg/77,552 lbs
- Length: (LOA) 25.49 m/83.63 ft (LWL) 20.29 m/66.57 ft
- Beam: 5.76 m/18.90 ft
- Draft: 3.99 m/13.09 ft

Steinlager 2 is a Bruce Farr-designed yacht. Skippered by Peter Blake, she won the 1989–90 Whitbread Round the World Race and line honours in the 1989 Fastnet Race. She was the only yacht to ever win all six legs of the Whitbread Round the World Race.

The crew included Brad Butterworth, Tony Rae, Kevin Shoebridge, Godfrey Cray, Ross Field, Graham Fleury, Barry McKay, Mark Orams, Dean Phipps, Mike Quilter, Cole Sheehan, Glen Sowry, Craig Watson and Donald Wright.
