= America II =

Racing sailboat

- Other names: Fiddler (US 46)
- Yacht club: New York Yacht Club
- Nation: United States
- Class: 12-meter
- Sail no: US 42, US 44 & US 46
- Designer(s): M. William Langan, Sparkman & Stephens
- Builder: Williams & Manchester Shipyard
- Launched: 1984, 1985 & 1986
- Owner(s): US Merchant Marine Academy Foundation, Manhattan Yacht Club Syndicate, New York Harbor Sailing Foundation

Racing career
- Skippers: John Kolius
- Notable victories: 1985 Cadillac Cup Regatta
- America's Cup: 1987

Specifications
- Type: Monohull Sloop
- Length: 20.14m (LOA)
- Beam: 3.70m
- Draft: 2.74m

Notes
- Aluminum alloy construction Built according to the Third International Rule America’s Cup

America II is a racing sailboat and one of the final America's Cup 12 Meters. There were a total of three America IIs commissioned for the New York Yacht Club's challenge in the 1987 America's Cup. These were US 42, 44 & 46 and all boats were named America II.

America II (US 46), skippered by John Kolius, competed in the 1987 Louis Vuitton Cup which was held in Fremantle, Australia running up to the America's Cup. The New York Yacht Club syndicate, competing as US Merchant Marine Academy Foundation, were the first to arrive in Fremantle in 1984. It had two 12-Meter boats, US 42 and US 44 (both named America II) sailing in the following year. A third sister boat, US 46 arrived shortly after. The challenge cost the NYYC and their partners US$15 Million. The America II Challenge was a partnership of the America II team, the New York Yacht Club and the United States Merchant Marine Academy, and included 34 affiliated U.S. yacht clubs, three corporate sponsors and over 115 corporate contributors.

America II (US 42), competing at Fremantle, was the first of three new 12-meters that represented the syndicate and has seven sets of wings that can be snapped on and off her keel at will. "We've probably imported more lead into Western Australia than anybody else," said Kolius.

== 1985 Cadillac Cup Regatta ==
America II (US 42) competed and won in the inaugural Cadillac Cup Regatta 2-1 and appeared as an early favorite for the America's Cup Challenge. John Kolius' team raced Tom McLaughlin and his team in the two day event. The regatta took place July 27–28 in Newport, RI and marked the culmination of America II's Summer Training. On August 7, shortly after the Cadillac Cup, US 42 and US 44 we shipped via container to Perth, Australia to begin a second full season of training on October 5, 1985.

== 1986 12 Meter World Championship ==
John Kolius and his America II (US 42) team finished third and was the top American contender in the World Championship races which ended February 18, 1986 in Perth, Australia. However, many of the American teams did not participate in the regatta either for strategic or logistical reasons.

The crew was plagued with bad luck on the water and a bad press on land. A bungled jibe that mangled a spinnaker, a split mainsail and a man overboard made her race results worse than her sailing performance actually was. She led the last race until the final leg and in other heats she was able to close in on the leaders, but she couldn't pull out a win.

Thomas Ehman Jr., executive director of the America II syndicate, said the America II team entered US 42 in the competition because they saw it as the slowest of its new boats.

The series consisted of seven fleet races, unlike the traditional America's Cup format of match-racing one-on-one.

America II, Australia II, and Australia III lost the first race to the New Zealand "Plastic Fantastic", which had only been launched a few weeks earlier.

== 1987 Louis Vuitton Cup ==
The 1987 Louis Vuitton Cup regatta was staged in three round-robin stages, with points awarded on an increasing scale for later the rounds in an attempt to favor the fastest boats at the end of the series. The top four boats were then placed in an elimination series to select the challenger. The first round robin saw three boats standout, America II (US 46) of the New York Yacht Club, Stars and Stripes 87 and the surprise of the regatta, KZ 7, all of which finished the first round robin with 11-1 records. The second round saw Stars & Stripes struggle. Conner's boat was optimized for heavy airs, and suffered from a shortage of sails for lighter breezes. When a spell of Easterlies settled over Western Australia she was caught out of her element and dropped four races. She lost to Tom Blackaller and USA in 5 to 10 knot winds, and the following day to the Kiwis, even though the breeze had picked up to 22 knots. On the ninth day she lost again to the British team White Crusader in 4 to 6 knots breeze, and the following day to Canada II, whom she had led around the final mark but was caught out when the breeze died away.^{[9]} The Kiwis continued to dominate the regatta, winning every one of their eleven match races, while America II continued to make a strong showing with a 9-2 record. The third round saw a change in fortunes. America II simply was unable to continue to improve her speed, while other boats were making improvements and getting faster. She struggled to a 6-5 record in the final round. What was a strong performance coming in simply was not enough by the third round, and their loss to KZ 7 placed them out of the running for the Semis. The loss meant the New York Yacht Club was eliminated for the first time in Cup history. USA with her unique design was finally showing her potential, as Tom Blackaller became better versed in handling the boat with the forward canard or rudder. Marc Pajot's French Kiss upset America II and found her way into the Semis.^{[10]}

The 1987 America's Cup was eventually won by Dennis Conner on Stars & Stripes 87 (US 55).

== Modern Day Racing ==
While 12 meters have been replaced by newer formats in the America's Cup they are still raced today. America II along with Australia II and all 12 meters built for the 1987 America's Cup are included in the Grand Prix Division.

Yachts in the Grand Prix Division race to the full Class Rule with no concessions, unlike their older peers. The generational divisions and 12-Meter-specific ratings system helps guide owners into the boat that best fits their objectives and budget. Given that the current Grand Prix division is made up of yachts designed for the heavy air of Fremantle, Australia they do not fair as well in less dramatic winds. To make them competitive in lighter-air venues like Newport, R.I., and the Mediterranean, owners may reconfigure the boats' rating trade-offs of length, displacement, and sail area. Additionally, advancements in hydrodynamic design require owners of Fremantle 12-Meters to fit new appendages in order to be fully competitive. Improvements in spars, hardware, and sails demand new purchases, as well. The cost of an unimproved Grand Prix yacht is only the tip of the financial iceberg, but a fully improved GP 12-Meter still offers good value for a 14-person, ~65-foot racing yacht.

== US 42 ==
US 42 was the first America II built and was launched in 1984. Nicknamed "Lego Boat" because the yacht (keels, rigs, rudders, bustles) could be set-up in different configurations as a 12 Meter. She portrayed Boomerang and later Platypus in the 1992 film Wind and was in the TV series "No Boundaries".

In 2015 the New York Harbor Sailing Foundation signed a deal to acquire US 42, the sister-ship to America II US 46. Once restorations to US 42 were completed there would then be two identical 12 Meters sailing and racing in the New York harbor. US 42 was dry docked in Newport for restoration through early 2017. As of summer 2017, US 42 joined sister ship US 46 for Match Racing in NY Harbor.

== US 44 ==
US 44 was the second America II built and was launched 1985. In November 1988 she was sold and shipped to Seattle for a refit to bring her into compliance with Coast Guard charter vessel requirements, before ultimately arriving in Honolulu, HI. It used to operate as a charter boat in Hawaii and had been heavily modified to accommodate pleasure cruises off the Hawaiian coast, including a smaller rig and seating for paid passengers. For many years, US 44 could be sailed double-handed from the aft cockpit while carrying up to 29 passengers where the trimming and grinding equipment was originally installed. As of 2015, US44 was not sailing and is believed to have been sold for scrap.

== US 46 ==
US 46 was the final America II built and was launched in 1986, she was shipped on June 6, 1986 to Perth Australia to join her sister ships. After the 1987 Cup, America II US 46 was shipped back to the United States. She was the star in the movie Wind as Radiance and later Geronimo, and then continued sailing in Newport, RI under the name Fiddler from 1993 to 2003.

A group of members from the Manhattan Yacht Club formed a syndicate to purchased her in 2007 to celebrate the club's 20th anniversary. She was then donated to the New York Harbor Sailing Foundation in 2012. She is now operated by the New York Harbor Sailing Foundation and serves as a sailing ambassador and one of the flagships of the harbor. US 46 is available for public sails and private charter in New York City.

== 1986 Special Edition Cadillac Eldorado ==
America II was the subject of several partnerships and corporate sponsors, not the least of which was Cadillac. Cadillac in partnership with the America II Syndicate produced the America II Limited Edition Eldorado, which originally retailed for $26,000. It featured two-tone paint, unique body striping, America II sail panel insignia, cassette player and a navy blue leather interior. The exterior is white with a light blue "water line" stripe on the bottom accompanied by a special wheel and trim package. The engine is a 4.1 liter, V8 and the transmission is a 4 speed automatic. Only 1,987 America II Eldorados were produced in reference to the 1987 America's Cup.

Skipper, John Kolius, was presented with the keys to the official car of the America II sailing team at the christening of US 46 in Newport, RI.
