= Carl Evans =

New Zealand sailor

Carl Evans (born 16 August 1990 in Auckland) is a New Zealand sailor who represented New Zealand at the 2008 Summer Olympics.

Evans attended Green Bay High School and sailed for the Kohimarama Yacht Club.

He made his international sailing debut in the 2003 North American Optimist championships. In 2006 he won the Tanner Cup, sailing a P-class sailing dinghy.

Evans later competed in the 420 class and partnered Peter Burling. In 2006 they won the 420 World Championships in Spain. They defended their title in 2007 in Auckland.

In 2008, they competed in the Beijing Olympics where they placed 11 out of 29 teams.
