= Alan Smith (sailor) =

New Zealand sailor (born 1964)

Alan Smith (born 1964) is a New Zealand sailor who has sailed at the Summer Olympics and in eight America's Cups.

== Sailing career ==
Born in Matamata, Smith joined New Zealand Challenge for the 1987 Louis Vuitton Cup and was the foredeck boss on KZ 1 during the 1988 America's Cup. He was the bowman for New Zealand Challenge at the 1992 Louis Vuitton Cup.

At the 1995 Louis Vuitton Cup, Smith sailed with oneAustralia.

He sailed with Toshiba during the 1997–98 Whitbread Round the World Race.

He joined Prada Challenge as a coach for the 1999 Louis Vuitton Cup, which they won, and the 2000 America's Cup.

He represented New Zealand at the 2000 Summer Olympics, sailing with Rod Davis and Don Cowie in the Soling class. The team finished second in the fleet races but failed to advance through the match racing round robins.

He sailed with OneWorld Challenge in the 2003 Louis Vuitton Cup, before returning to Luna Rossa Challenge for the 2007 Louis Vuitton Cup.

He joined Oracle Racing for the 2010 America's Cup, before spending time with Mascalzone Latino, sailing with them in the Louis Vuitton Trophy events.
