= Jeremy Scantlebury =

New Zealand sailor

Jeremy Scantlebury is a New Zealand sailor who has competed in multiple America's Cups.

Scantlebury sailed with Digby Taylor on NZI Enterprise during the 1985–86 Whitbread Round the World Race. He raced with New Zealand Challenge on KZ 7 in the 1987 Louis Vuitton Cup and sailed in the 1992 Louis Vuitton Cup. He joined Team New Zealand and was part of the crew that won the 1995 America's Cup on NZL 32 and defended it in the 2000 America's Cup, where he was the boat building manager.

Scantlebury joined OneWorld Challenge as their pitman for the 2003 America's Cup. He was the sailing team manager for Victory Challenge in the 2007 Louis Vuitton Cup.

In 2009 he sailed with the Greek Challenge in the Louis Vuitton Pacific Series.
