= Aran Hansen =

Olympic sailor from New Zealand

Personal information
- Full name: Aran John Hansen
- Nationality: New Zealand
- Born: 18 December 1960 (age 65) Papakura
- Height: 1.86 m (6.1 ft)

Sailing career
- Sport: Sailing
- Class: Soling
- Updated on 27 February 2020

Aran John Hansen (born 18 December 1960) is a sailor from Papakura, New Zealand, who represented his country at the 1984 Summer Olympics in Los Angeles, United States as crew member in the Soling. With helmsman Tom Dodson and fellow crew member Simon Daubney they took the 11th place. Aran took also part in the 1988 Summer Olympics in Busan, South Korea. With same team they took the 7th place in the Soling.
