= Chris Dickson (sailor) =

New Zealand sailor (born 1961)

Chris Dickson MBE
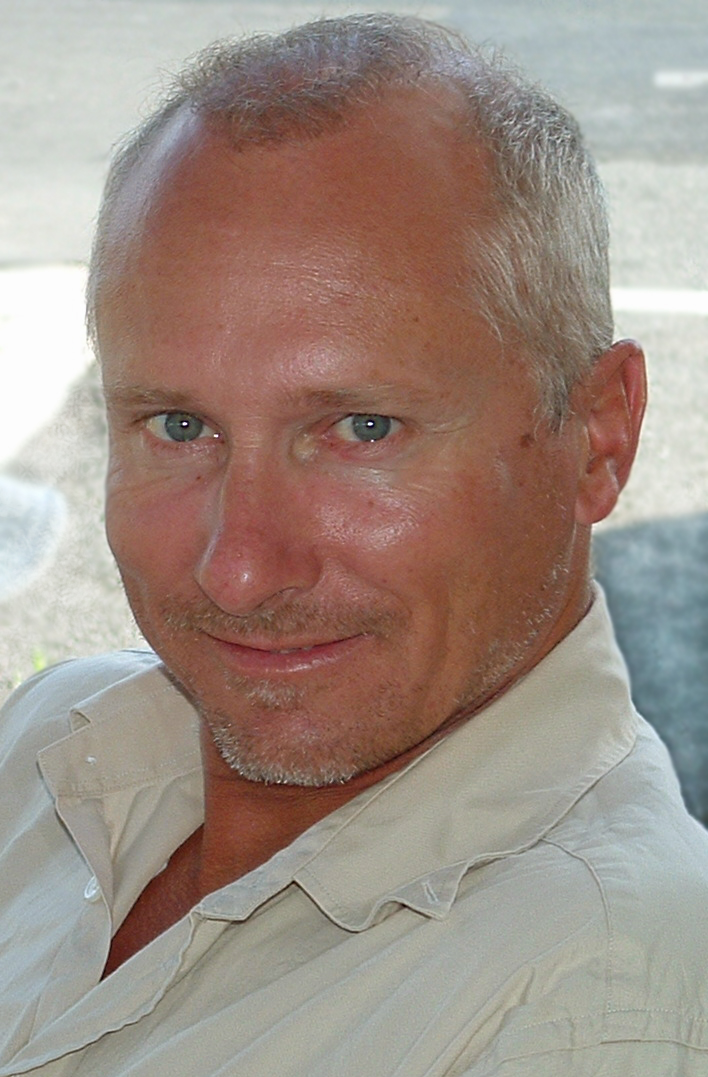
- Dickson in 2009

Personal information
- Full name: Christopher Stuart Dickson
- Born: 3 November 1961 (age 64) Auckland, New Zealand
Medal record
World Championship
Gold medal – first place	1988 Perth	Match racing
Gold medal – first place	1989 Lymington	Match racing
Gold medal – first place	1991 Hamilton	Match racing

Christopher Stuart Dickson MBE (born 3 November 1961) is a sailor from New Zealand. He was world youth champion three years in succession and later became world match race champion three times. He also skippered several yachts in America's Cup racing, and for New Zealand at the 2000 Summer Olympics, and in numerous other sailing competitions.

As skipper of Tokio he looked set to win the W60 class in the 1993–94 Whitbread Round the World Race until the boat was dismasted in the fifth leg. He also skippered Larry Ellison's 78 foot maxi yacht Sayonara to line honours in the 1998 Sydney to Hobart Yacht Race and in four world championship regattas.

== Early life ==
Dickson was born in Auckland on 3 November 1961, the son of Marilyn and Roy Dickson. He was educated at Westlake Boys' High School, and went on to study at the University of Auckland.

== Career ==
=== Early sailing career ===
Dickson sailed from an early age, starting out in the Sabot and P Class boats, before graduating to Lasers and 470s. In 1977 he won both the Tanner Cup and Tauranga Cup for P Class events with a perfect zero points score in both. These events were subsequently won by other noted New Zealand skippers, Russell Coutts (1978) and Dean Barker (1988). By the time he turned 15 he had won every regatta possible, from match racing between clubs to provincial and national championships.

=== Youth world champion ===
The year after his Tanner-Tauranga cups double, Dickson won the first of his three ISAF Youth World Championships, with David McKay in the 420 at Perth, Western Australia. He won again the following year in the 420 at Livorno, Italy with his high school classmate Hamish Willcox, and again the following year (1980) at Fort Worth, Texas in the Laser 11 with Sean Reeves.

=== Olympic Games ===
Dickson was selected in the New Zealand team as reserve for the 1980 summer Olympics in Russia. At the 2000 Olympic Games in Sydney, Dickson and crewmate Glen Sowry sailed well in the Tornado catamaran but finished fifth overall after recording two results outside the top 10, (fifteenth in Race 4 and twelfth in Race 12).

=== America's Cup ===
Dickson appeared on the America's Cup scene in 1987 when he was skipper of New Zealand's first America's Cup challenge KZ 7 in the 1987 America's Cup at Fremantle, Australia. He was beaten that year by the eventual winner Dennis Conner and Stars & Stripes 87 in the Louis Vuitton Cup Final after winning 33 of 34 races in the round-robin phases and sweeping French Kiss 4–0 in the semi-finals.

In the 1987 Queen's Birthday Honours, Dickson was appointed a Member of the Order of the British Empire, for services to yachting.

Since 1987, Dickson has been prominent in the international sailing world, particularly around the America's Cup.

- 1987: skipper of Kiwi Magic (KZ 7), challenger entrant, finished second in the Louis Vuitton Cup
- 1992: skipper of Nippon (JPN 26), challenger entrant, finished third in the Louis Vuitton Cup
- 1995: Owner and skipper of Tag Heuer (NZL 39), challenger entrant, finished third in the Louis Vuitton Cup
- 2003: skipper of Oracle BMW Racing (USA 76), challenger entrant, finished second in the Louis Vuitton Cup
- 2006/2007: CEO and skipper of BMW Oracle Racing, challenger of record for the 2007 America's Cup

The 2007 America's Cup was a bad experience for Dickson, who by this time had become one of the highest paid sailors in the world. He resigned his position as CEO of BMW Oracle Racing because of a devastating 1–5 loss in the 2007 Louis Vuitton Cup at the hands of semi-finals opponent Luna Rossa Challenge. Luna Rossa's helmsman James Spithill dominated the veteran Dickson in all the pre-starts.

In race 5, Dickson incurred two penalties during the pre-start and was ordered to stand down for race 6. Five days later, Dickson resigned from the team, saying it was time for him to "step aside" and for the team "to move on". Software billionaire Larry Ellison, the owner of the BMW Oracle team, subsequently officially announced his intentions to launch a challenge for the 33rd America's Cup.

=== Later sailing career ===
After a two-year absence from racing, Dickson returned to competitive sailing in 2009 as helmsman of Vincitore, finishing 1st in class and 1st overall at the IRC San Francisco Big Boat Series. He also acted as tactician on Full Metal Jacket in the China Sea Regatta (Hong Kong), finishing in second place. He continued to act as tactician on Full Metal Jacket at the Kings Cup (Phuket), finishing in fourth place and then was skipper in the New Zealand Match Racing Championships competing with a youth crew and finishing third.

== Family life ==
Dickson has two children. They live in Auckland.
