= Challenge France =

Yacht

- Yacht club: Société Nautique de Marseille
- Nation: France
- Class: 12-metre
- Sail no: F–8

Racing career
- AC Challenger Selection Series: 1987

Challenge France is a 12-metre class yacht that competed in the 1987 Louis Vuitton Cup.
