= Tony Rae (sailor) =

New Zealand sailor

Anthony Rae, also known as Trae, (born 26 June 1961) is a New Zealand sailor who has competed in the Volvo Ocean Race six times and is currently in his 11th America's Cup campaign.

== Early years ==
Rae attended Mount Roskill Grammar School.

== Sailing career ==
After sailing on Lion New Zealand during the 1985–86 Whitbread Round the World Race, Rae joined the New Zealand Challenge that competed on KZ 7 at the 1987 Louis Vuitton Cup. He was then part of the crew on Steinlager 2 that won every leg in the 1989–90 Whitbread Round the World Race before racing on another winner, NZ Endeavour, in the 1993–94 event. He also competed with New Zealand Challenge in the 1992 Louis Vuitton Cup.

He was then onboard Team New Zealand when they won the 1995 America's Cup with Black Magic. He then returned to ocean sailing, being on board Innovation Kvaerner during the 1997–98 Whitbread Round the World Race, before rejoining Team New Zealand for the 2000 and 2003 America's Cups.

He was part of Team New Zealand as a mainsail trimmer when they won the 2007 Louis Vuitton Cup, before losing the 2007 America's Cup to Alinghi 2–5. He then was part of the team's entry into the 2011–12 Volvo Ocean Race, Camper Lifelovers, before the AC72 crew for the 2013 America's Cup, which Team New Zealand lost 8–9 to Oracle Racing.

He joined Team Vestas Wind for the 2014–15 Volvo Ocean Race, where he broke a rib before the start of leg 2. He competed in the 2017 World Masters Games with his father, Murray, before joining the New Zealand Sailing team in the Extreme Sailing Series.

Rae has also been a member of Emirates Team New Zealand during three consecutive successful America's Cup campaigns: the 35th America's Cup in Bermuda (2017), the successful defence of the 36th America's Cup in Auckland (2021), and the defence of the 37th America's Cup in Barcelona (2024). As part of the team's on-water operations crew, he is now contributing to preparations for the 38th America's Cup in Naples in 2027, which will mark his 11th America's Cup campaign.
