= Adam Beashel =

Australian sailor

Sailing career
- Sport: Sailing
Medal record
Sailing
Representing Australia
World Championships
Gold medal – first place	2000 Newport	Farr 40
Silver medal – second place	2000 Melbourne	49er

Adam Beashel is an Australian sailor. He is best known for being part of Team New Zealand at the 2003 America's Cup and strategist for Emirates Team New Zealand at the 2007 America's Cup.

Beashel was part of the oneAustralia team that came second in the 1995 Louis Vuitton Cup.

He is also a 49er sailor. Together with Teague Czislowski, he came second in that class at the 1999 World Championships to Chris Nicholson and Ed Smyth.

He and Czislowski won the national selection process for the 2000 Olympics in the 49er class, but the Australian Yachting Federation instead nominated Nicholson and Daniel Phillips for the sole spot at the Olympics as they were considered better possibilities for a medal. Nicholson and Phillips eventually finished sixth. He was injured in April 2007 while with Emirates Team New Zealand, and was replaced by Mark Mendelblatt.

He is from a sailing family. His father Ken Beashel is a sailor and boat builder in Sydney. His brother Colin is an Olympic medal winning sailor who crewed on Australia II in 1983. His wife Lanee Butler is a boardsailor who competed at four Olympics.

He and Lanee have two young sons, born in 2008 and 2009.
