= Yves Pajot =

French sailor

Medal record

Sailing

Representing France

Olympic Games
Silver medal – second place	1972 Kiel	Flying Dutchman

Yves Pajot (born 20 April 1952) is a French sailor. He won a silver medal in the Flying Dutchman class with his brother Marc at the 1972 Summer Olympics. In 1987 he competed at the Louis Vuitton Cup. With his brother Marc, he also won the World Championships in the International 505 dinghy in 1974 Marstrand.

He skippered the Marseilles Syndicate in the 1987 Louis Vuitton Cup.
