= Tom Dodson =

Olympic sailor from New Zealand

Personal information
- Full name: Thomas Ward Dodson
- Nationality: New Zealand
- Born: 17 May 1957 (age 69) Hastings, New Zealand
- Height: 1.83 m (6.0 ft)

Sailing career
- Sport: Sailing
- Class: Soling
- Updated on 27 February 2020

Thomas Ward Dodson (born 17 May 1957) is a sailor from Hastings, New Zealand, who represented his country at the 1984 Summer Olympics in Los Angeles, United States as helmsman in the Soling. With crew members Simon Daubney and Aran Hansen they took the 11th place. Dodson took also part in the 1988 Summer Olympics in Busan, South Korea as helmsman in the Soling. With same crew members then they took the 7th place.
