= Tanner Cup =

New Zealand youth sailing competition

The Tanner Cup is a New Zealand youth inter-provincial sailing competition. One under 17 year old sailor from each region competes in P Class yachts.

The competition is named after George Tanner, who donated the trophy, and was first sailed in 1945. Many of New Zealand's top sailors have competed in and won the Tanner Cup, including Russell Coutts, Dean Barker, Adam Minoprio and Jo Aleh.

The national open P Class competition for the Tauranga Cup is normally sailed at the same venue.

== List of winners ==
Year	Winner	Province
1945	William Hayman	Wellington
1946	Graham Mander	Canterbury
1947	Graham Mander	Canterbury
1948	Not sailed due to polio epidemic	
1949	William Nalder	Nelson
1950	Des Townson	Auckland
1951	Jimmy Gilpin	Bay of Plenty
1952	Jimmy Gilpin	Bay of Plenty
1953	Jimmy Gilpin	Bay of Plenty
1954	M. Sellwood	Canterbury
1955	Rob Denniston	Bay of Plenty
1956	Rob Denniston	Bay of Plenty
1957	Robert Beetson	Auckland
1958	Melvin Tyson	Canterbury
1959	Lex McGrath	Canterbury
1960	Lex McGrath	Canterbury
1961	Mark Paterson	Auckland
1962	Mark Paterson	Auckland
1963	Mark Paterson	Auckland
1964	Roy Granic(h)	Auckland
1965	Robert Webber	Auckland
1966	Brian Baker	Auckland
1967	Ian Williams	Bay of Plenty
1968	John Moyes	Auckland
1969	John Moyes	Auckland
1970	Murray Thom	Auckland
1971	Tom Stevens	Canterbury
1972	Craig Gilbert	Auckland
1973	David Barnes	Wellington
1974	Gavin Auld	Wellington
1975	Trevor Cox	Auckland West
1976	Brent Foster	Auckland West
1977	Chris Dickson	Auckland West
1978	Russell Coutts	Otago
1979	Craig Greenwood	Auckland West
1980	John Irvine	Otago
1981	Greg Flynn	Wellington
1982	Terry Nicholas	Auckland
1983	Craig Monk	Auckland
1984	Jon Bilger	Auckland
1985	Jon Bilger	Auckland
1986	Simon Patchett	Auckland
1987	Ramon Davies	Auckland
1988	Dean Barker	Auckland
1989	Zane Gifford	Auckland
1990	Andrew Estcourt	Hawkes Bay
1991	Peter Waring	Auckland West
1992	Simon Cooke	Auckland East
1993	Fraser Milne	Auckland East
1994	Ben Coutts	Auckland West
1995	Derek Scott	Canterbury
1996	Mike Bassett	Auckland West
1997	Carl Peters	Auckland West
1998	Mark Kennedy	Auckland East
1999	Michael Bullot	North Harbour
2000	Brad Thom	
2001	Adam Minoprio	Auckland West
2002	Jo Aleh	Auckland
2003	James Williamson	Auckland
2004	Riley Dean	South Canterbury
2005	Paul Snow-Hansen	Auckland West
2006	Carl Evans	Auckland
2007	Thomas Saunders	Bay of Plenty
2008	Logan Dunning-Beck	Auckland West
2009	Oscar Rorvik	Bay of Plenty
2010	Erica Dawson	Auckland West
2011	Isaac McHardie	Waikato/Thames
2012	Isaac McHardie	Waikato/Thames
2013	Leonard Takahashi-Fry	Whanganui/Manawatu
2014	Cole Rippey	Bay of Plenty
2015	Sam Bacon	Whanganui/Manawatu
2016	Robbie McCutcheon	Whanganui/Manawatu
2017	Blake McGlashan	North Harbour
2018	Nathan Vince	Auckland
2019	Blake Hinsley	Auckland
2020	Tim Howse	Auckland
2021	Sean Kensington	Auckland
2022	Blake Mckinnon	North Harbour
2023	Oli Stone	Auckland
2024	Nate Soper	North Harbour
2025	Hamish Brown	North Harbour
