= Tauranga Cup =

The Tauranga Cup is an annual New Zealand national open sailing competition for under 17 year-olds, sailing P Class dinghies. Many of New Zealand's top sailors have competed in and won the Tauranga Cup, including Dean Barker, Chris Dickson and Leslie Egnot.

The competition was first sailed in 1940, and the name comes from the fact that P Class yachts were originally sailed in Tauranga.

The national inter-provincial P Class competition for the Tanner Cup is normally sailed at the same venue.

== List of winners ==
Year	Winner
1940	Ron Nalder
1941	W. Bean
1942	Not sailed due to World War II
1943	Not sailed due to World War II
1944	Owen Mackay
1945	William Hayman
1946	Graham Mander
1947	Graham Mander
1948	Not sailed due to polio epidemic
1949	David Mander
1950	Don Dixon
1951	Jimmy Gilpin
1952	Jimmy Gilpin
1953	Jimmy Gilpin
1954	A. Brown
1955	Rob Denniston
1956	Rob Denniston
1957	Wayne Innes
1958	Melvin Tyson
1959	Wayne Innes
1960	Lex McGrath
1961	Mark Patterson
1962	Russell Bowler
1963	Mark Patterson
1964	Roy Granic(h)
1965	Ron Watson
1966	Greg Moyes
1967	Brian Baker
1968	John Moyes
1969	John Moyes
1970	Alan Moyes
1971	Alan Moyes
1972	Greg Palmer
1973	David Barnes
1974	Paul Francis
1975	Brian Jones
1976	Stuart Mills
1977	Chris Dickson
1978	Len Davies
1979	Leslie Egnot
1980	John Irvine
1981	Terry Nicholas
1982	Terry Nicholas
1983	Steven Cotton
1984	Jon Bilger
1985	Jon Bilger
1986	Geoff Senior
1987	Ramon Davies
1988	Dean Barker
1989	Zane Gifford
1990	Chris Main
1991	Simon Cooke
1992	Simon Cooke
1993	Alistair Tate
1994	Simon Lee
1995	Derek Scott
1996	Kevin Borrows
1997	Carl Peters
1998	Mark Kennedy
1999	Sam Fenwick
2000	Scott Kennedy
2001	Scott Kennedy
2002	Alistair Thompson
2003	Scott Morrison
2004	Thomas Olds
2005	Paul Snow-Hansen
2006	Carl Evans
2007	Thomas Saunders
2008	James Turner
2009	Oscar Rorvik
2010	Jayvee Buchanan
2011	Trent Rippey
2012	Isaac McHardie
2013	No cup awarded. (Leonard Takahashi-Fry)
2014	Kate Stewart
2015	Scott McKenzie
2016	Robbie McCutcheon
2017	Blake McGlashan
2018	Seb Menzies
2019	Sean Kensington
2020	Tim Howse
2021	Sean Kensington
2022	Joe Leith
2023	Oli Stone
2024	Oli Stone
2025	Blake Batten
2026	
