= Dean Barker (sailor) =

New Zealand yachtsman

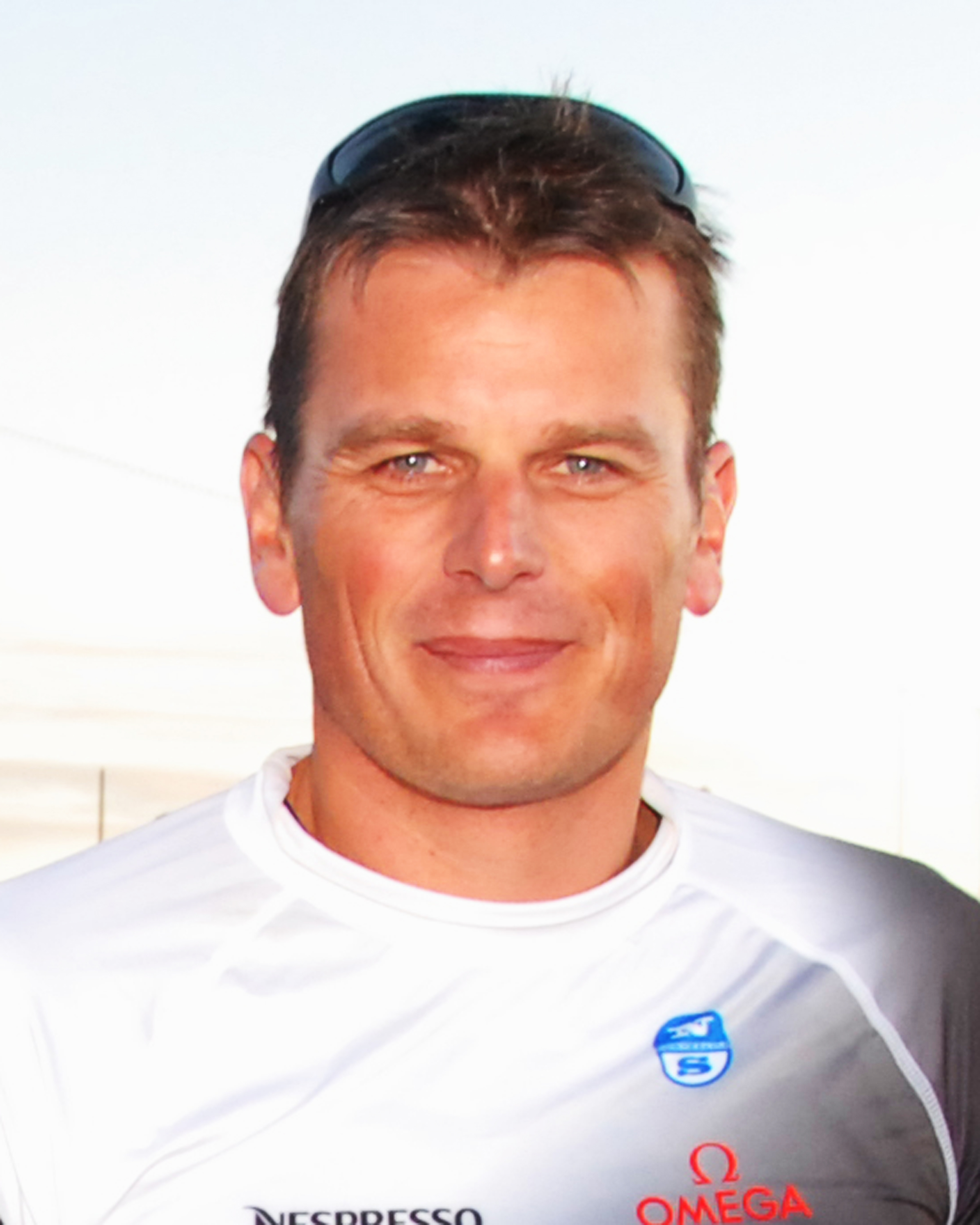

Personal information
- Full name: Dean Raymond Barker
- Born: 18 April 1973 (age 53) Auckland, New Zealand

Sailing career
- Sport: Sailing
- Club: Royal New Zealand Yacht Squadron (1996–2015) Kansai Yacht Club (2015–2017) New York Yacht Club (2018-2021)
- Classes: IACC, TP 52, AC72, AC50, AC75
Medal record
Sailing
Representing New Zealand
World Championships
Gold medal – first place	2000 Split	Match racing

Dean Raymond Barker (born 8 April 1973) is a New Zealand yachtsman. He is best known internationally for his participation in America's Cup yacht races.

== Early life and family ==
Barker was born in 1973 in Takapuna, New Zealand. Barker's father is the New Zealander Ray Barker of the Barkers Clothing retail chain. Dean Barker was educated at Westlake Boys High School. Barker married former New Zealand field hockey representative Mandy Smith in February 2004. They have four children, three daughters; Mia, Olivia & Isla and one son, Matteo. Dean Barker is also a major shareholder in Kiwi Yachting Consultants.

== Early sailing career ==
Barker sailed from an early age, starting out in Optimist and P Class dinghies, before graduating to Lasers and Finns.

== Olympic Games ==
- 1996 – Unsuccessfully trialed to represent New Zealand in the Finn for the 1996 Olympic Games.
- 2000 – Did not participate in the New Zealand selection trials due to America's Cup commitments.
- 2004 – Represented New Zealand in the Finn finishing 13th out of 25 competitors

== America’s Cup ==
Barker's first introduction to the America's Cup was in 1995 when Russell Coutts invited him to train with Team New Zealand. He opted for an Olympic campaign rather than to travel to San Diego. Although he was not involved in the successful challenge, he became a permanent member of the cup defense team once the cup was in Auckland.

Because there was no defender's series Team New Zealand used high intensity in-house racing to prepare for its cup defense. Barker's skill as a match racer rapidly developed and he became skipper of the "B Boat" in these races. Although the racing was not public, and scores were not kept, it became apparent that he was at least holding his own with Coutts.

Team New Zealand went on to successfully defend the 2000 Cup 5–0, with Coutts relinquishing his normal helming role to Barker in the last race. After the 2000 cup there were multiple defections to other syndicates, most notably Coutts and Brad Butterworth to Alinghi and as a result Barker became skipper.

In the 2003 Americas Cup, the Swiss boat Alinghi defeated Team New Zealand in a 5–0 series. The subsequent internal team review left Barker's reputation intact and he was selected as skipper and helmsman for the 2007 challenge.

The renamed Emirates Team New Zealand, with Barker as skipper and helmsman, was one of the challengers for the 2007 Valencia America's Cup. Barker started Team New Zealand's quest to take the Cup back to New Zealand by winning the challengers' 2007 Louis Vuitton Cup— beating the Italian Luna Rossa Challenge team 5–0 in the final after the previous elimination of the other 9 challengers. This was the first time that the Louis Vuitton Cup had ever been won without a race loss to the opponent. This gave Emirates Team New Zealand and Barker the opportunity to race the Swiss challenger Alinghi for the 32nd America's Cup.

By winning Race 2 of the 2007 America's Cup against the Defender Alinghi, Emirates Team New Zealand ensured that the scoreline in the America's Cup would not show a clean sweep victory for the first time in fifteen years. Many experts believed Emirates Team New Zealand had a good chance of winning but finished the 2007 America's Cup with a 2–5 race defeat.

Overall the 2007 America's Cup racing was close with the final race won by Alinghi, skippered by fellow New Zealander Brad Butterworth, with a winning delta of 1 second.

Barker has participated in two defences and two challenges for the America's Cup. After the 2007 event, his record as helmsman in Finals was 3 wins to 10 defeats.

In August 2013 Barker once again skippered Emirates Team New Zealand to victory in the 2013 Louis Vuitton Cup— beating the Italian Luna Rossa Challenge team 7–1 in the final. He set a Louis Vuitton/America's Cup speed record in race #7 of 47 knots (87 km/h; 54 mph).

Barker and Team ETNZ then went on to Challenge Americas Team Oracle in the 2013 Americas Cup Final and went on to lose the final. ETNZ at one point during the final series had won 6 of the first 7 races ultimately going on to lose by a score of 9–8. The largest comeback in Americas Cup history. A rift started to emerge between Barker and Team ETNZ's CEO Grant Dalton.

Through 20 September 2013, Dean Barker's record as helmsman in America's Cup Finals stands at 11–15. With only one more race win needed for Emirates Team New Zealand to secure the Cup, Dean Barker will need one more America's Cup series to break even.

Early 2015 saw Grant Dalton offer Barker a shore-based position in order to make room for a new helmsman, Peter Burling and a new skipper, Australian sailor Glenn Ashby. Barker refused to take this position and accepted the offer to become CEO and skipper of a newly formed Japanese syndicate.

On 21 May 2015, Barker was announced as CEO and skipper of the Japanese challenger, Softbank Team Japan.

Barker was the helmsman of the American Magic challenge from the New York Yacht Club to the 2021 America's Cup. The team lost in the semifinals of the qualifying event 2021 Prada Cup against Luna Rossa Prada Pirelli, despite a strong start in the qualifying event.

== Summary of sailing career ==
- 1988: P-Class Tanner Cup (1st), P-Class Tauranga Cup (1st)
- 1990: 1st IYRU Youth Sailing World Championships
- 1991: NZ Laser National Champs (1st)
- 1993: Asian Pacific Laser Champs (1st), NZ Matchracing Champs (1st), world youth Laser champs (10th)
- 1994: NZ Matchracing champs (1st)
- 1995: NZ Matchracing champs (1st)
- 1996: Finn class world ranking (15th), Olympic Finn class trials (5th), Kenwood Cup (3rd)
- 1997: Steinlager Line 7 Cup (2nd), NZ Matchracing champs (2nd), Sydney-Hobart (9th)
- 1998: Australia Cup (1st), ACI Cup Croatia (2nd), Swedish Match Cup (3rd), Kenwood Cup (1st)
- 2001: ISAF World Matchracing champs (1st)
- 2003: Skipper and helmsman of America's Cup defender Team New Zealand (beaten 0–5 by challenger Alinghi)
- 2004: Olympic Games, Finn class (13th)
- 2005: Congressional Cup (1st)
- 2006: MedCup TP52 circuit (2nd)
- 2007: Louis Vuitton Cup winner and America's Cup challenger (beaten 2–5 by defender Alinghi)
- 2009: Louis Vuitton Pacific Series (1st)
- 2009: Audi MedCup TP52 circuit (1st)
- 2010: Audi MedCup TP52 circuit (1st)
- 2010: Louis Vuitton Trophy (3 championship wins)
- 2011: America's Cup World Series
- 2013: Louis Vuitton Cup winner and America's Cup challenger
- 2017: Louis Vuitton Cup skipper of the Softbank Team Japan
- 2021: Prada Cup helmsman of the American Magic (beaten 0–4 in semifinals by Luna Rossa Prada Pirelli)
