= Graham Fleury =

Olympic sailor from New Zealand

Personal information
- Full name: Graham John Fleury
- Nationality: New Zealand
- Born: 28 June 1959 (age 66) Ōtāhuhu

Sport

Sailing career
- Class: Soling
- Updated on 28 February 2020

Graham Fleury (born 28 June 1959) is a sailor from Ōtāhuhu, New Zealand. who represented his country at the 1992 Summer Olympics in Barcelona, Spain as crew member in the Soling. With helmsman Russell Coutts and fellow crew member Simon Daubney they took the 8th place.
