= Harry Highet =

New Zealand civil engineer (1892–1989)

Henry Ashton Highet, commonly known as Harry Highet, (27 January 1892 – 2 February 1989) was a New Zealand civil engineer famous for his P-class yacht design. This class is famous for being the sailing trainer vessel for many new entrants into the sport, and virtually every famous New Zealand yachtsman, including Sir Peter Blake and Russell Coutts, learnt to sail in one.

== Early life and family ==
Highet was born in Wellington in 1892, the son of Scottish immigrants Thomas Morton and Isabella Highet. He was the youngest of nine children. Harry's father was an ironmonger and later worked at the Evans Bay Patent slip, introducing Harry to shipbuilding from a young age.

Highet's sister, Mary, married George Page, Mayor of Nelson from 1935 to 1941.

== First World War ==
In 1914, Highet enlisted to fight in the First World War, attaining the rank of Lieutenant by the end of the war and being awarded a military cross.

== P-class ==
Highet designed the P-class sailing dinghy while in Whangarei following the First World War, while working for the Public Works Department (later the Ministry of Works) as a draughtsman. The prototype first sailed on New Year's Day 1920, but it wasn't until Highet moved to Tauranga in 1923 that the P-class began to be popularised.

Highet was awarded the first "Yauchtsman of the Year" award in 1963.

== Professional life ==
Highet was also involved in many railway and bridge construction projects in his capacity as a civil engineer for the Public Works Department. Originally a draughtsman, Highet later rose to be a leading civil engineer in bridges for the Ministry of Works (as the Public Works Department was renamed in 1960).
