= 1987 America's Cup =

26th America's Cup yacht race

26th America's Cup
Defender Australia
- Defender club: Royal Perth Yacht Club
- Yacht: Kookaburra III

Challenger United States
- Challenger club: San Diego Yacht Club
- Yacht: Stars & Stripes 87

Competition
- Location: Fremantle
- 31°57′9″S 115°38′48″E
- Dates: 31 January – 4 February 1987
- Rule: 12-metre
- Winner: San Diego Yacht Club
- Score: 4–0

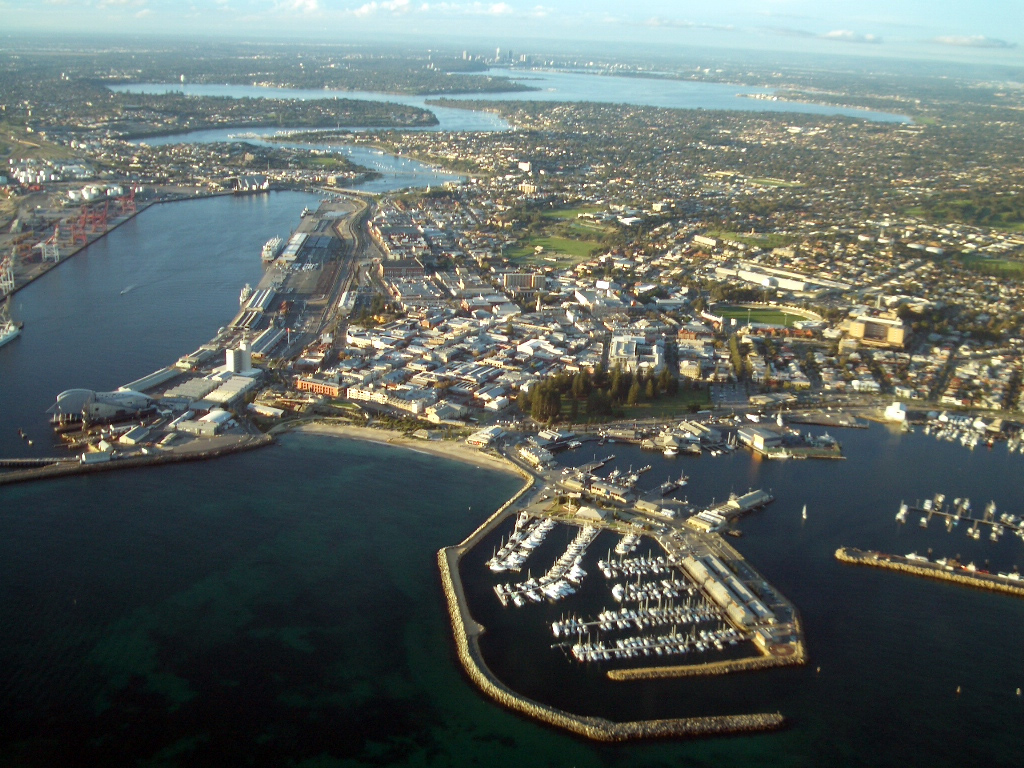
Harbour city of Fremantle, showing the purpose-built Challenger Harbour in the extreme foreground with Fishing Boat Harbour behind it. Fremantle Sailing Club is further to the right and just out of view. The competing syndicates were based in these harbours.

The 1987 America's Cup was the twenty-sixth challenge for the America's Cup.

The American challenger Stars & Stripes 87, sailed by Dennis Conner, beat the Australian defender Kookaburra III, sailed by Iain Murray, in a four-race sweep in the best of seven series. Conner thus became the first person both to lose the America's Cup and then to win it back.

The series was held in Gage Roads off Fremantle, Western Australia during the Australian summer months between October 1986 and February 1987. The Royal Perth Yacht Club was the defending club and the organiser of the defence series. Yacht Club Costa Smeralda of Porto Cervo, Sardinia was appointed the challenger of record and hence the organiser of the challenger series.

This was the last time that 12-metre class yachts were used in the America's Cup and the first time for 132 years that it had not been defended by the New York Yacht Club.

== Background ==
The 1983 America's Cup off Newport, Rhode Island was the most significant America's Cup regatta since the first event off the Isle of Wight. Alan Bond's Australia II pulled off a major upset by winning the series from Conner's Liberty to become the first success in twenty-five challenges for the Cup. The New York Yacht Club had previously built the longest winning streak in international sporting history, having successfully defended the trophy over 132 years.

Most previous challenges had been from the United Kingdom – notably by Scotsman Sir Thomas Lipton who had challenged five times between 1899 and 1930 in his 37-metre (121 ft) Shamrock sloops. Australia mounted its first challenge in 1962 with 12-metre class yachts when Sir Frank Packer and his Gretel were beaten 4–1. Packer made more challenges, with Dame Pattie and Gretel II. Alan Bond mounted his first challenge in 1974 with Southern Cross, followed by Australia in 1977 and 1980 and ultimately had success with Australia II in 1983.

It was in this context that the 1987 America's Cup was seen as the best opportunity yet for a successful challenge, as the event was now outside the control of the NYYC and held in a location with strong but variable breezes, unlike the predictable and placid winds off Rhode Island. The regatta therefore attracted enormous additional interest over previous series.

== The venue ==
=== Selection ===
Following the 1983 win, there was speculation over the likely location of the defence, with three main candidates potentially under consideration. In the late 1970s, Alan Bond had developed a marina and a large associated housing development north of Yanchep called "Yanchep Sun City" (now known as Two Rocks), about one hour's drive north of Perth. The marina was built with an expectation of success from earlier America's Cup challenges. The second candidate was the town of Mandurah, a coastal township a similar distance south of Perth. The last, and ultimately successful location considered was Fremantle as the required infrastructure at the other two locations were considered inadequate by the Royal Perth Yacht Club as defender. Also, the proximity to the major population centre of Perth and its international airport were seen as an important factor.

=== Development ===
For most of its life until 1985, Fremantle had been a port city with a population of less than 24,000. Private investment and public infrastructure redevelopment commenced on a massive scale in anticipation of a large influx of visitors arriving to watch the event. This expectation proved over-ambitious, but 13 challenging syndicates from six countries and four defence syndicates arrived with a fleet of 29 12-metre yachts.

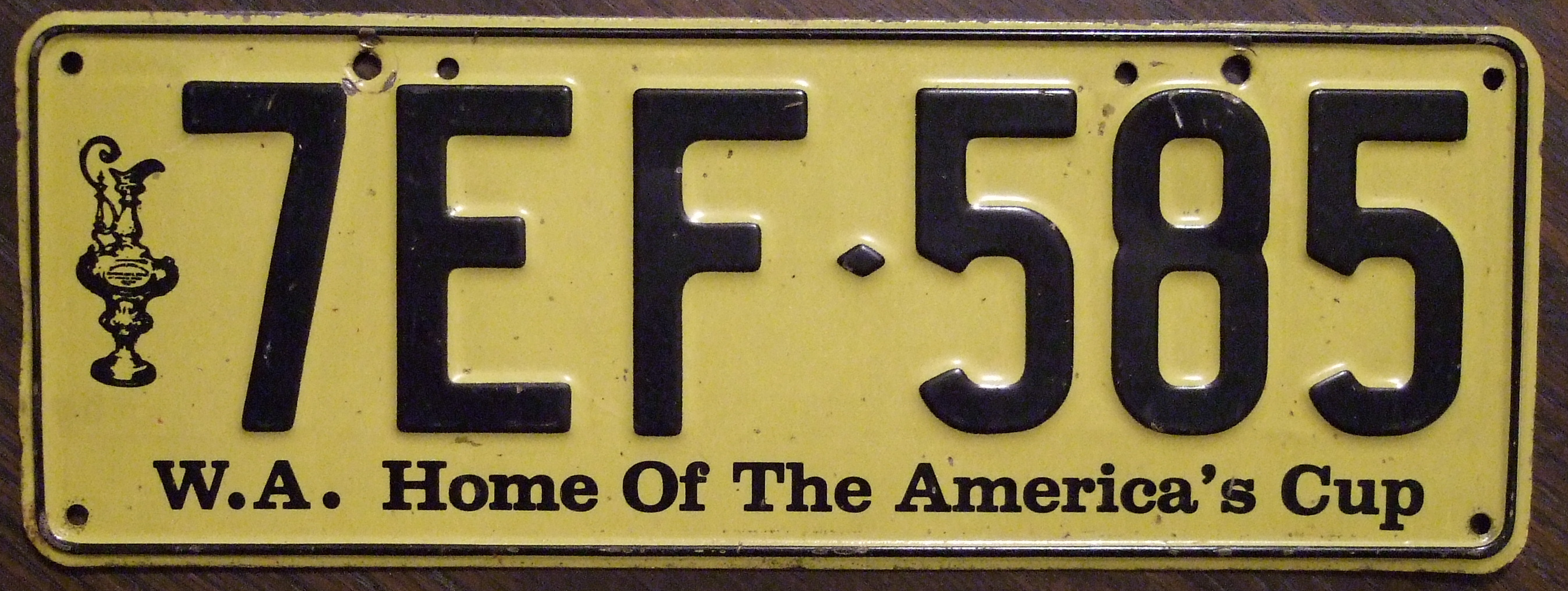
"Home of the America's Cup" vehicle registration plate

In 1985, an "Office of America's Cup Defence" was set up to coordinate the state government's involvement in the staging of the event. The government embarked on a number of projects such as Hillarys Boat Harbour and extensions to the Perth to Fremantle railway line. A new marina, Challenger Harbour was built alongside the existing Fishing Boat Harbour, and the state government received funding from each defence syndicate, a total of $2.3 million, to offset costs associated with the harbour works of $8 million. Vehicle registration plate slogans in Western Australia changed from The Wildflower State and the State of Excitement to W.A. Home of the America's Cup In 1985 and 1986 changes in liquor laws and trading hours regulations were made to expand services for visitors. The Executive Director of the Royal Perth Yacht Club's America's Cup Defence Committee was Noel Robins, a skipper and crew member in previous America's Cups, and later a Paralympic gold medallist.

A Festival of Sport was conducted in late 1986 and early 1987 which included a cricket Test and One Day International tournament, athletics, hockey, basketball, squash, golf, racing, trotting, cycling, football, baseball, fishing (MAAC Blue Water Fishing Classic), lawn bowls, karate and kick-boxing competitions. A heavy-weight boxing title fight and a World Sprint Car Championship were held in early January.

The cruise ship Achille Lauro was chartered by a private group for the duration of the series, to act as a viewing platform and accommodation for 1,400 visitors. It also housed the international jury which oversaw the races. Other cruise ships which visited the port for the races included Island Princess and several Royal Viking vessels.

== 12-metre 'world championship' races ==
In January and February 1986, a series styled as the '12-metre world championship' was staged off Fremantle as a precursor to the America's Cup event scheduled for January 1987. A dozen syndicates competed, mainly as a shakedown series to determine their relative competitiveness and to train crews for the anticipated heavy conditions. Strong winds throughout most of the regatta resulted in four 27-metre (90 ft) masts, a dozen booms and numerous sails being destroyed. Five crewmen were washed overboard during the races. Gary Jobson, of the 'Heart of America' syndicate declared that the Fremantle waters were "unsuitable for racing."

Australia III, the heavy-weather Ben Lexcen designed successor to Australia II won the series comfortably. The New Zealand challenge boat KZ 5, a fibreglass-hull Bruce Farr design, came in second, with the New York Yacht Club entrant America II third.

== Course ==
The America's Cup course

The Fremantle Fairway Buoy 31°57′9.0″S 115°38′48.12″E was renamed the "America's Cup Buoy" for the duration of the event and marked one end of the start and finish lines for each America's Cup race. The buoy is a permanent navigation marker used for shipping in and out of Fremantle harbour and is located 8 nautical miles (15 km) west-north-west of the harbour, in Gage Roads or 5.5 nautical miles (10.2 km) due west of City Beach. Races in the challenge and defence elimination trials used other markers in the general vicinity.

The orientation of the course was set such that the starting line was square to the prevailing wind 20 minutes before each race start. Races were 24.3 nautical miles (45.0 km) long, consisting of beats into the wind in legs 1, 3, 6 and 8; downwind runs on legs 2 and 7; and reaches on legs 4 and 5.

== Contestants ==
=== Challengers ===
Thirteen syndicates from six countries (Canada, France, Italy, New Zealand, the United Kingdom and the United States) competed, bringing 25 boats for the right to challenge. Stars & Stripes 87 was the winner of the 1987 Louis Vuitton Cup and earned the right to sail for the America's Cup.

=== Defenders ===
Four syndicates competed for the right to represent the Royal Perth Yacht Club as the defender of the America's Cup. After a series of round robin races, a Defender Finals contest was sailed between Alan Bond's Australia IV and Kookaburra III of Kevin Parry's Taskforce 87 syndicate, with Kookaburra III sweeping the finals five races to nil to win the Defender selection process. In doing so she placed Alan Bond's syndicate on the outside of an America's Cup regatta for the first time in thirteen years.

== Races for the Cup ==
The best-of-seven final series were scheduled to be held between 31 January and 15 February 1987. There being a four-race sweep result, the final race was held on 4 February.

Race 1	31 January: Course direction: 225° on leg one. Wind speed: 8 to 18 knots (33 km/h).	Stars & Stripes beat Kookaburra III by one minute and 41 seconds.
Race 2	1 February: Course direction: 195° on leg one.	Stars & Stripes beat Kookaburra III by one minute and 10 seconds.
Race 3	2 February: Course direction: 210° on leg one.	Stars & Stripes beat Kookaburra III by one minute and 46 seconds.
Race 4	4 February: Course direction: 220° on leg one. Changed to 210° on leg three.	Stars & Stripes beat Kookaburra III by one minute and 59 seconds.

== Newsletters ==
(Held in Battye Library)

- Defence Downunder : official newsletter of the America's Cup Defence 1987 Ltd. Perth, W.A. : America's Cup Defence 1987 Ltd., 1984–1986.
  - Issues: Vol. 1, no. 1 ([June 1984])-v. 3, no. 3 (Dec. 1986)
- Kookaburra : Taskforce 1987 America's Cup Defence. North Fremantle, W.A : Taskforce 1987, 1985–1987.
  - Issues: Vol. 1, no. 1 (June 1985)-v. 1, no. 6 (Jan. 1987)

== Maps ==
- Roberts, N and D. (1986) America's Cup course, Fremantle W.A. [cartographic material] Fremantle, W.A. : Postcard Factory at Down Under Press, Reduced facsimile of "Approaches to Fremantle", Royal Australian Navy Hydrographic Service (Chart No. AUS 112m), America's Cup Race Edition.

== See also ==
- 1983 America's Cup
