= OneAustralia =

IACC racing yacht built for the 1995 America's Cup

oneAustralia was an International America's Cup Class racing yacht owned by a syndicate of the same name and headed by John Bertrand, the former skipper of the America's Cup-winning Australia II. Prior to its entry in the 1995 America's Cup, the yacht attracted controversy due to Bertrand's interpretation of new rules for racing syndicates, and due to attempts by Philip Morris International to advertise on the yacht during the race. The yacht broke in two and sank during the semi-finals, only 175 metres (0.094 nmi) from the start line, on 6 March 1995. All 17 crew members were rescued by three other boats.

The Monday after the incident, the Australians were coordinating plans with the United States Navy to conduct a salvage operation. They hoped that oneAustralia 95's mast, sails and hardware might be saved and still be of use for the remainder of the challenge.
