= Stars & Stripes 87 =

Yacht that won the 1987 America's Cup

- Yacht club: San Diego Yacht Club
- Nation: United States
- Class: 12-meter
- Sail no: US–55
- Designer(s): Britton Chance Jr., Bruce Nelson, David Pedrick
- Builder: Derecktor Shipyards
- Launched: 1986
- Owner(s): Sail America Foundation

Racing career
- Skippers: Dennis Conner
- Notable victories: 1987 Louis Vuitton Cup, 1987 America's Cup
- America's Cup: 1987

Stars & Stripes 87 (US 55) was the 12 Meter challenge boat sailed by Dennis Conner in his bid to reclaim the America's Cup from the Royal Perth Yacht Club of Australia in 1987.

== Design and development ==
Stars & Stripes 87 was built in 1986. She was the culmination of the team's 12 Meter design advances, the fifth boat in the Sail America Foundation stable, and the third of the new boat designs by Britton Chance Jr., Bruce Nelson and David Pedrick. In 1983 the Cup had been lost to Australia II, a wing keeled boat that was markedly quicker in stays than Liberty. It was known that the course for the Cup in 1987 would have an increase in the number of legs, going from six legs to eight. There had been no change made in the course length to be sailed, thus the distance of each leg was shorter. Most believed this would place a greater premium on design trends established in Australia II, a boat that could turn fast and accelerate out of a tack quickly.

Conner chose not to follow the common reasoning. His direction to the design team was to create a boat built for straight ahead speed. Conner believed pure boat speed would be the most important factor for success in the heavy seas and strong winds expected at Gage Roads off Fremantle. The boat designed was framed longitudinally rather than transversely, making the boat stiffer and stronger without a corresponding weight increase. The keel had a bulbous lead. A pair of wings extended off the aft-most third of the keel. The boat's snub nose entry was not the most aesthetic of designs, but the result was a fast, heavy air boat. John Marshall, Conner's mainsheet trimmer on board Liberty in the '83 campaign, was made design team coordinator. Marshall was essential to the team's success during the testing and tuning phase. Stars & Stripes 87 was competitive in 10 to 12 knots of wind, and excelled in winds of 16 knots and more.

== Sea trials and selection ==
Dennis Conner sea trialed the boats against each other in the Pacific waters of Hawaii, taking advantage of the steady 18 to 25 knot trade winds off Waikiki (33 to 46 km/h, or 21 to 29 mph). The in-house competition between boats was intense, particularly between the 86 and 87 boats, with Stars & Stripes 87 receiving the nod for the trip to Australia. The 85 boat was taken as well as a trial horse against which changes made to the 87 boat could be measured. (Note: Conner liked the cut of the 85 boat best, stating that it looked and sailed fast, but the later designs were projected to sail as boats larger than their waterline measured out at, which was predicted to be advantageous in heavy seas.)

== Louis Vuitton Cup ==
Stars & Stripes 87 was a clear contender from the start of the 1987 Louis Vuitton Cup regatta, winning 11 of 12 races in the first round robin, including the only round robin victory of any boat over Kiwi Magic (KZ 7). The second round was a period of concern. Conner's boat was optimized for heavy airs, and suffered from a shortage of sails for lighter breezes. When a spell of Easterlies settled over Western Australia she was caught out of her element and dropped a disappointing four races. She lost to Tom Blackaller and USA in 5 to 10 knot winds, and the following day to the Kiwis, even though the breeze had picked up to 22 knots. On the ninth day she lost again to the British team White Crusader in 4 to 6 knot breezes, and the following day to Canada II, which she had led around the final mark but was caught out when the breeze died away. Aided by between-round changes to the keel's winglets and the more consistent presence of the "Fremantle Doctor" in late summer, the third round saw her come to form, with significant improvement in her upwind performance. In the final round robin she lost twice, to the top boat Kiwi Magic and to the always competitive USA. Coming into the Louis Vuitton Cup finals she was the second highest point scorer, and was set on a collision course with longtime rival Tom Blackaller, and USA.

=== Finals form ===
Dennis Conner believed his effort with Liberty reached her maximum speed potential too early during the 1983 Cup defense. One of the goals of the Stars & Stripes 87 camp was to increase boat speed throughout the campaign to peak going into the finals.

All boats competing underwent changes during the challenger and defender series, some successful, some not. Changes made on Stars & Stripes 87 consistently resulted in steps forward in boat speed. This was largely due to Marshall, whose technical, sailmaking and organizational skills enabled him to coordinate a great deal of technical information. The greatest increase occurred with the re-working of the boat's keel between the second and third round robins. Close competitor Tom Blackaller felt the boat had found a 2/10-knot (0.37 km/h; 0.23 mph) increase in Velocity made good when sailing to windward as she entered the third round robin. The final tweak was the application of a drag reducing shark skin like riblet covering, applied to the hull just prior to the challenger finals.

=== Louis Vuitton Cup semifinals and finals ===
KZ 7 was the top qualifier of the round robins, followed in the points competition by Stars & Stripes 87, USA and French Kiss. In the Challenger semi-finals KZ 7 easily defeated French Kiss 4–0, with none of the races closely contested. A far more spirited competition occurred between Stars & Stripes 87 and USA, with USA leading all of the first race till the final mark. In the end though Tom Blackaller couldn't quite find the speed he was looking for, and the result was Stars & Stripes 87 winning the semi 4–0. Tactician Tom Whidden offered the following on the team's progress:

"The low point was when we lost those four races in November and we really didn't set our boat up very well for that. The high point was beating Blackaller, four-zip. That was quite an accomplishment because he was extremely fast."

Going into the Louis Vuitton Finals, Kiwi Magic (KZ-7) was the favorite. She was clearly a fast boat in both light and heavy air, having beaten Stars & Stripes 87 twice, and winning thirty-seven of thirty-eight match races. However, Stars & Stripes 87 showed her best form of the regatta, particularly in heavy winds above 20 knots (37 km/h; 23 mph).

The first two races were similar, with Stars & Stipes going out to an early lead in the opening beat to the first windward mark, and then holding that lead throughout the remainder of the race, holding ground on the downwind legs and extending it on the beats. The third race started out much as the previous two, with both boats taking a long tack out to the left hand side of the course in what Dennis Conner termed a "speed test". Stars & Stripes 87 reached the mark first, rounding the first windward mark 26 seconds ahead. Shortly thereafter a snap shackle failed causing the spinnaker to drop into the sea. KZ-7 closed the gap, gibing back and forth across Conner's stern until they achieved what they were looking for, an inside overlap on the bottom mark. Having gained right of way the Kiwis were able to slide ahead on the turn at the mark. Once there Kiwi Magic proved a very difficult boat to get past. On the second beat to windward they covered every move of the blue hulled boat, keeping Conner at bay with a tight cover. The two reaching legs did not allow room to get around a competitor, which brought the boats to the third beat to windward. This was one for the record books. Conner threw 55 tacks at KZ 7, along with two false tacks in an effort to break away. The New Zealanders covered each move in one of the most exhausting and tense beats to windward in America's Cup history. The result was a win for the Kiwis, and a match series now close with Stars & Stripes up by a race, 2–1.

The fourth race saw fortune make a complete change. Now it was KZ 7 that experienced a number of uncommon structural failures, all of which snowballed by the actions of the skipper and crew, culminating in Kiwi Magic blowing her backstay in an abrupt gibe. The race was lost to Stars & Stripes 87 by 3 minutes 38 seconds.

The fifth race was extremely competitive. Stars & Stripes 87 took the initial lead on the first windward leg as she had in the first four races, but on the second beat to windward her Number 6 genoa blew to pieces, giving Kiwi Magic a chance to close down the gap and overtake Stars & Stripes 87. All hands went forward to clear the wreckage, and then bring to deck and hoist the Number 7 genoa, completing the task before Kiwi Magic could slip by. From there on Stars & Stripes 87 held on to the slimmest of leads throughout the next four legs. Rounding the final mark she held a six-second advantage with the New Zealand crew applying steady pressure, but here Dickson made a rare mistake when he struck the mark while rounding. The infraction required KZ 7 to come about and round again. The resulting loss in time ended all hope Kiwi Magic had of overtaking Stars & Stripes 87 in the final beat. Stars & Stripes 87 took the series, four races to one.

Syndicate head Michael Fay summed up the New Zealander's effort: "We did the best we could. We couldn't beat the other guy on the day, and we've got to shake his hand and say 'Well done' because that's what happened. They did a very good job and they beat us." Added helmsman Chris Dickson: "The best boat won. Thirteen years beat thirteen months experience."

Following the completion of the race, Gianfranco Alberini, Commodore, Yacht Club Costa Smeralda, the Challenge Club of Record responsible for organizing the challenger selection process had at last completed his responsibilities.

"We have concluded today two hundred and twenty three races. It was quite an historic performances, and I think it will go down in the Guinness records. Two hundred twenty three races, very successful selecting the two best yachts for the finals of the Louis Vuitton Cup, and the best challenger for the America's Cup 87."

== America's Cup ==
The America's Cup was entered into with much hope for the defender Kookaburra squad. The Kookaburras were the upstarts, having beat out the prior Cup champion Alan Bond syndicate and Australia IV. A late round keel modification had provided Kookaburra III with a clear edge in speed, allowing them to emerge triumphant from a very close and contentious defender series. After months of intense racing, the defense of the Cup was finally at hand.

Kookaburra was to be sailed aggressively, and was thought to have an edge in light airs. The first race looked to be a good day for the Australians, with flukey, light air at 10 to 12 knots, thought to be Kookaburra's best conditions. However Conner kept Stars & Stripes 87 from getting tangled up at the start and reached the first mark ahead. She led throughout the race, never being seriously threatened. This first test between the two boats was a harbinger of more to come. It was clear Stars & Stripes 87 had the edge in sailing to windward, even in light air, and could hold her own on the downwind legs. The Fremantle Doctor returned after the first match, and with the heavy winds came an even greater difference in boat speeds. The Aussies gave a great effort, but they simply lacked the boat speed to stay with Stars & Stripes 87, which showed a consistent twenty second advantage on each beat to windward. She won the series in a four-race sweep.

Stars & Stripes 87 was not a light weather boat, nor was she as quick in stays as either Kiwi Magic or Kookaburra III, but in the heavier winds off Fremantle she could outpace any challenger in straight-line sailing to windward. She was equally able to foot for pace to escape a windward cover, or point higher to power away from an opponent on her windward quarter. Though both Kiwi Magic in the challenger finals and Kookaburra III in the America's Cup were sailed aggressively, the edge in boat speed held by Conner allowed him to overpower his competitors in a single tack drag race to the first windward mark. The challenger finalists and cup defenders were unable to engage him in a tactical race, where the quicker Kiwis and Kookaburras held the advantage. Said Conner:

"It's a difficult problem when you have a boat like Stars and Stripes that won't play the match racing game. When we don't tack and we don't cover, it's pretty hard for them to be aggressive and exploit the fact that they do tack better and maneuver better."

Conner believed his Stars & Stripes 87 held a 0.3-knot (0.56 km/h; 0.35 mph) increase in upwind speed over Liberty, the 12 Meter he had sailed in defense of the cup in 1983. This represented a remarkable increase in boat speed, and enabled Conner and his team aboard Stars & Stripes 87 to recapture the America's Cup Trophy. Stars & Stripes 87 was the final 12 Meter to win the America's Cup, and as such she represented the zenith in 12 Meter design.

== Post Racing ==
For many years Stars & Stripes 87 was in St. Maarten, berthed with a small stable of 12 Meter boats. It was used as a team building activity, and the boats were sailed against each other in mock races, recreating the excitement of America's Cup 12 Meter races. In 2017 Hurricane Irma struck St Maarten, devastating the island and wrecking the boats stored there. Stars & Stripes 87 suffered severe damage to her hull, had its mast snapped 3 feet above the deck, and she sank.

In 2021 Stars & Stripes 87 was sold to The New York Harbor Sailing Foundation, which owns two other 12 Meter yachts from the 1987 Challenger series, New York Yacht Club's America II US 42 and America II US 46. Stars & Stripes 87 US 55 was delivered to Portsmouth, RI, and is currently on the hard and can be viewed at Safe Harbor New England Boatworks, Portsmouth, RI.

A fundraising effort has been headed by the NY Harbor Sailing Foundation to restore Stars & Stripes 87 and make her seaworthy again. As of October 2023, she is in Newport, RI awaiting restoration to commence.

== See also ==
Stars & Stripes (America's Cup syndicate)
