= Marc Pajot =

French sailor

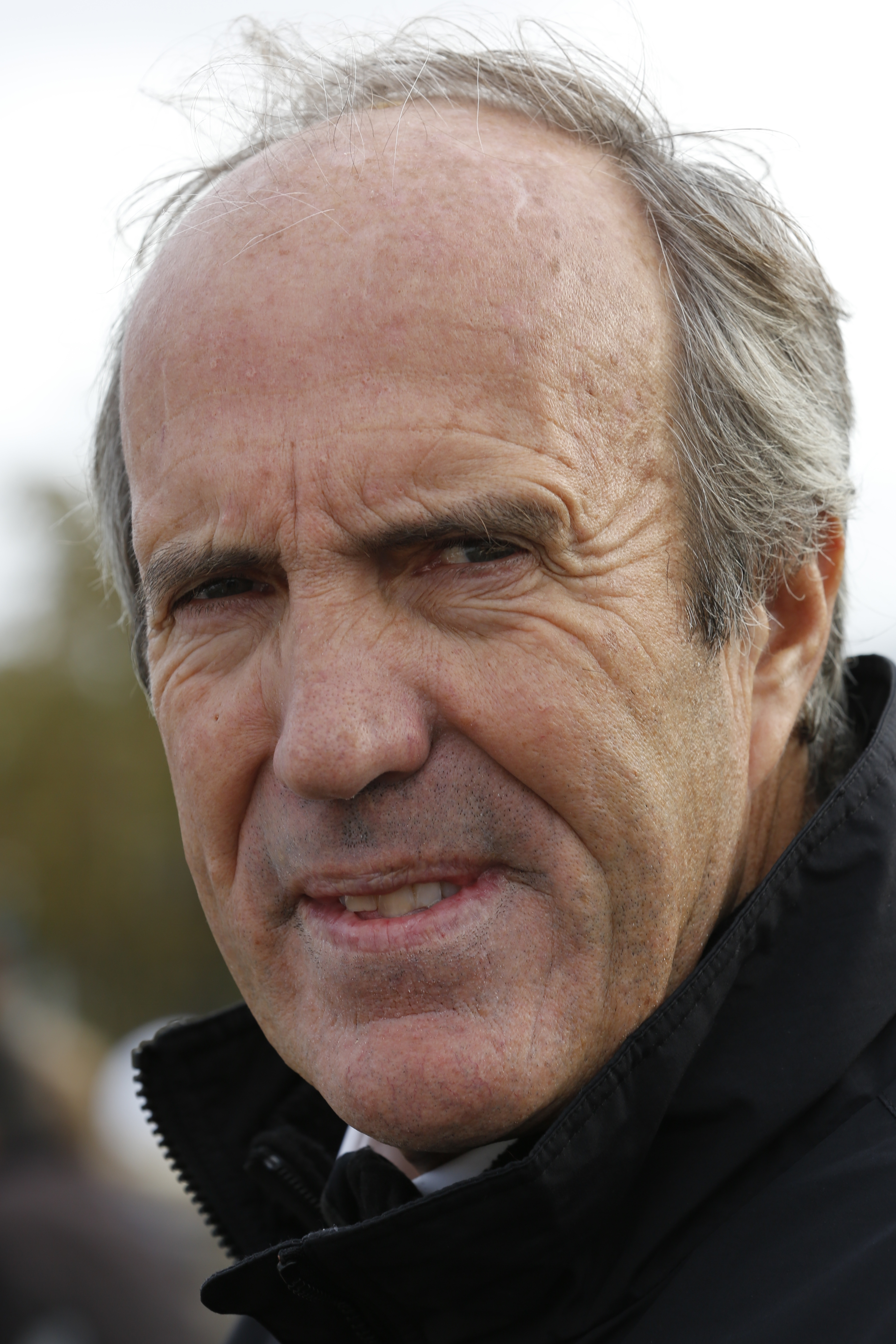
- Marc Pajot in Le Havre, November 2013
- Born: Marc Pajot; 21 September 1953 (age 71); La Baule-Escoublac, France
- Honors: Officer of the ordre national du Mérite Knight of the Mérite Maritime; Vermeil de la Ville de Paris medal Double laureate of the Guy Wildenstein Prize of the Académie des sports

Medal record

Sailing

Representing France

World Championships
Bronze medal – third place	1994 Crouesty	5.5m

Marc Pajot (born 21 September 1953 in La Baule) is a French sailor. He has been a crew member on Éric Tabarly’s boats.

Noted for winning the silver medal at the 1972 Olympics at 19 with his older brother Yves, 5 times world champion, winner of the cross-Atlantic Route du Rhum, twice semi-finalist representing France at the America’s Cup as a Project Manager and Skipper, he has been representing French sailing achievement around the world.

Member of French Maritime Academy, the French Yacht Club, and the Monaco Yacht Club he is now settled in Cannes, Côte d’Azur, running a Yacht Selection activity and a consulting activity in marina landscaping.

== Sailing career ==
=== From the age of 14 to 23, with his brother Yves ===
Marc Pajot accumulates national and international titles :

- Olympic Silver Medal winner, in 1972 in Flying Dutchman.
- 5 times World Champion
- 7 times French Champion

=== 10 years competing on the oceans ===
Marc Pajot sets out to conquer the oceans under the wing of Eric Tabarly and crosses the Cap Horn at the age of 20 during the first team race around the world, the Whitbread (See Volvo Ocean Race) in 1973.

He sets the professional standards for high seas regattas by promoting his sponsors, amongst which Paul Ricard and Elf Aquitaine with whom he will lead on to accomplish extraordinary performances.
He takes the 2nd place in 1979 at the double handed transatlantic race Lorient-Burmuda-Lorient with the hydrofoil Paul Ricard.

==== Elf Aquitaine – Titan of the seas ====
His Elf Aquitaine catamarans – will enable him to accomplish a series of performances between 1980 and 1983:

- Winner La Baule Dakar race 1980
- Atlantic record holder in 1981
- Winner singlehanded race Route du Rhum 1982

Marc Pajot has so far crossed 15 times the Atlantic Ocean as a skipper, crew member, or single handed.

=== The America’s Cup ===
As a project manager, Skipper and helmsman, Marc Pajot has been able to federate the best in the profession, sponsors, naval architects, engineers, tacticians and crew, to run after the America’s Cup for four challenges:

- French Kiss team 1987, Perth, Australia
- Ville de Paris team 1992, San Diego, USA
- France 2 team 1995, San Diego, USA
- First America’s Cup Swiss team 2000, Auckland, NZ

Twice he succeeded in skippering the French challenge to the semi-finals of the Louis Vuitton Cup.

- with French Kiss in 1987
- with Ville de Paris in 1992

During those 25 years of competitions, Marc Pajot has managed and overseen the conception and creation of over 15 boats from 45 to 100 ft.

== Other areas within the sailing world ==
Since 2000 Marc Pajot has also become a yacht broker providing yacht selection services and does consultancy in Marina landscaping around the world.

=== Yachting accomplishments ===
- East to West transatlantic record holder on the Elf-Aquitaine catamaran in 1981 (9d 10h 6s 34c).
- Vice Olympic champion of Flying Dutchman in 1972, with Yves Pajot, his older brother
- Vice world champion 505 en 1968
- High seas regatta:
  - La Baule-Dakar in 1980 on Elf-Aquitaine (EA) with François Boucher and Paul Ayasse
  - New York City-Lizard Point, Cornwall-Brest in 1981 on EA
  - Multihull trophy in 1981 and 1982 on EA
  - Route du Rhum in 1982 on EA
  - Multi Cup in 1983 on EA
- Second place in the Two-Handed Transatlantic Race Lorient-Bermuda-Lorient in 1979 with Éric Tabarly on Paul Ricard.
- Third place in the Single-Handed Trans-Atlantic Race in 1984
- 3 participations as skipper in the America's Cup, on French Challenge in 1987, 1992 and 1995

=== Distinctions ===
- only sportsman to be a two time laureat of the Guy Wildenstein Prize from the Académie des sports, in 1975 (with his brother Yves) and in 1981.
- Officer of the Ordre national du Mérite
- Knight of the Ordre du Mérite Maritime
- Vermeil medal of the Ville de Paris

=== Publications ===
- Elf Aquitaine, un catamaran pour vaincre (édition Pen Duick)
- Voile Racontée par Marc Pajot (édition Hatier Rageot – 1985)
- Défi à la Coupe de l’América (édition Rivage – 1987)
- Des J.O. à la Coupe de l’América (édition Robert Laffont – 1991)
