= P-class sailing dinghy =

Type of single sail dinghy

P-Class
Development
- Designer: Harry Highet
- Year: 1923

Boat
- Crew: 1

Hull
- Type: Monohull
- Construction: Wood; Plywood; Fibreglass
- LOA: 2.3 m (7 ft 7 in)

Rig
- Rig type: Bermuda rig

Sails
- Upwind sail area: 45 sq ft (4.2 m^{2})

The P-Class is a type of small single sail dinghy, popular as a training boat for young people in New Zealand. This class is famous for being the sailing trainer vessel for many new entrants into the sport, and virtually every famous New Zealand yachtsman, including Dean Barker and Russell Coutts, learnt to sail in one. The P-Class was for many years the most common sailing boat in New Zealand.

== Origin ==
The P-Class was designed by New Zealand civil engineer Harry Highet as a simple vessel in which children and young people could learn to sail. It is a 2.13 metre long, slab sided, v bottom single hull, single sail Bermuda rigged dinghy, and is designed to be sailed by one person. The low aspect ratio Bermudan rig took over from a gunter rig in the 1950s. The boom overhangs the stern of the boat. It has a small deep cockpit with the rest of the hull making water tight buoyancy compartments. When capsized the boat floats very high in the water. The hull has a minimum weight of 90 lbs so is very solid. Even 40-year-old boats can be bought in good condition.

The first example appeared at Onerahi near Whangārei on New Year's Day, 1920. However it was not until Highet and his family moved to Tauranga in 1923 that the full potential of his design became apparent. Soon a fleet of a dozen or so boats were racing each weekend on Tauranga Harbour. The P-Class was initially known as the "Tauranga Class". Boats carried the letter "P" on their sails, to indicate they were primary trainers.

By 1940, an Inter-Provincial Competition had been established for the P Class, but this was held only in 1940 and 1941, before lapsing for the rest of World War Two. The competition resumed in 1945, with sailors racing for the Tanner Cup, a trophy donated by Mr George Tanner. A separate Inter-Club competition for the Tauranga Cup began at about the same time. Both competitions are still held annually.

Originally built of solid wood, plywood was introduced in 1956 and fibreglass hulls were allowed in 1975. Aluminium spars were introduced in 1976 and carbon fibre - composite masts, in 1998. The class is a one design class with tight building restrictions ensuring that hulls spars sails and foils are very similar in weight and dimensions.

A beginner's boat sells for $300 NZ and a top racing boat about $3000–5000NZ. Racing boats have a full range of double sided sail controls with masts and foils made of carbon fibre, and at least 2 quality sails for different wind strengths.

The P class is generally sailed by boys and girls from 11 to 15. Because of its short length it is difficult to sail down wind in waves, giving the boat a tendency to nose-dive, so children develop advanced sailing skills at a young age.
