= David Barnes (sailor) =

New Zealand sailor (1958–2020)

Personal information
- Full name: David John Barnes
- Born: 27 April 1958 Wellington, New Zealand
- Died: 23 October 2020 (aged 62)

Sport
- Country: New Zealand
- Sport: Sailing
Medal record
Sailing
Representing New Zealand
470 World Championships
Gold medal – first place	1981 Quiberon	Open
Gold medal – first place	1983 Weymouth	Open
Gold medal – first place	1984 Auckland	Open
Bronze medal – third place	1982 Cascais	Open

David John Barnes (27 April 1958 – 23 October 2020) was a New Zealand America's Cup sailor, and three-time 470 world champion.

== Early years ==
Born in Wellington, Barnes was educated at Tawa College. He married Karen in 1986, and the couple had three children.

== Sailing career ==
Barnes skippered the KZ1 yacht which lost to the United States in the 1988 America's Cup race.

== Later years ==
Barnes was diagnosed with multiple sclerosis. In 2013 he became involved with Kiwi Gold Sailing, a group of paralympians attempting to qualify a Sonar for the 2016 Paralympics. The team included fellow America's Cup veteran Rick Dodson. However, Barnes' condition worsened and he withdrew from the team in 2014.

Barnes died on 23 October 2020, aged 62.

== Career achievements ==
- 1973 Won the Tanner Cup and Tauranga Cup PClass
- 1974 Won the National Championship Starling Class
- 1975 Third in World Youth Championship 420 Class
- 1976 Third in World Youth Championship Fireball Class
- 1976 Reserve for the Olympics 470 Class
- 1981 Won the World Championship 470 Class
- 1983 Won the World Championship 470 Class
- 1984 Won the World Championship 470 Class
- 1985 NZ America's Cup Challenge in Perth/Skipper KZ5/Alternate Helmsman KZ7
- 1987 Skipper for KZ7/won the 12 metre Worlds in Sardinia
- 1988 NZ America's Cup Challenge in San Diego/Skipper of KZ-1 New Zealand vs Dennis Conner's catamaran Stars & Stripes US-1.
- 1992 NZ America's Cup Challenge in San Diego/Tactician to Rod Davis/One of four directors for the campaign
- 1995 America's Cup Challenge with One Australia/Testing Helmsman/Part of "Fluid Thinking" design team
- 1996 Employed by James Farmer QC/Organised and supervised construction of his Mumm 36 Keelboat/Skipper for the campaign
- 2000 America's Cup Challenge with America True/Skippered one of the boats through the testing program/Conceptual Director
- 2003 America's Cup Challenge with GBR/General Manager

Awards
Preceded by Anthony Cuff	Lonsdale Cup of the New Zealand Olympic Committee; 1981; 1983; With: Hamish Willcox	Succeeded by Neroli Fairhall
Preceded by Neroli Fairhall	Lonsdale Cup of the New Zealand Olympic Committee; 1981; 1983; With: Hamish Willcox	Succeeded by Ian Ferguson
