= Kiwi Magic =

New Zealand
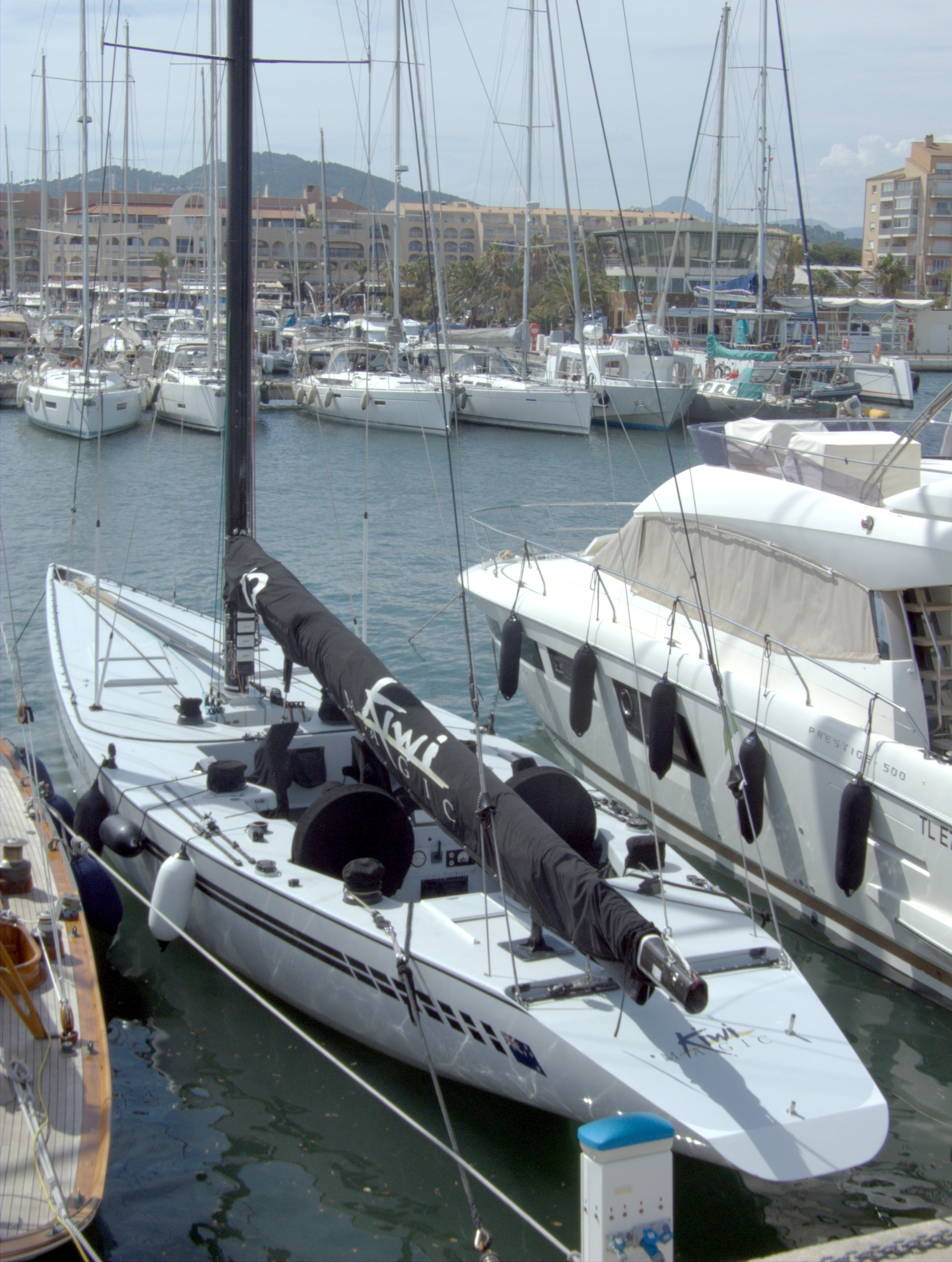
- Kiwi Magic, at Hyères (France) in 2024.
- Yacht club: Royal New Zealand Yacht Squadron
- Nation: New Zealand
- Class: 12 Metre
- Sail no: KZ–7
- Designer(s): Ron Holland, Laurie Davidson, Bruce Farr
- Builder: McMullen & Wing
- Launched: 1986
- Owner(s): Michael Fay

Racing career
- Skippers: Chris Dickson

Specifications
- Type: Monohull

New Zealand (KZ 7) "Kiwi Magic" was the America's Cup challenge boat sailed by Chris Dickson in the Louis Vuitton Cup Challenger series held in Gage Roads off Fremantle, Australia during the summer months of 1986 through 1987. She was New Zealand's first America's Cup entry and was the premier boat in the New Zealand Challenge syndicate.

== Enter: New Zealand ==
With Alan Bond's Royal Perth Yacht Club victory in 1983, and the arrival of the America's Cup in Australia, a sailing event that had been prohibitively far away and expensive suddenly was delivered to the near doorstep of New Zealand. Realising this presented an opportunity to become involved, a Belgian businessman named Marcel Falcher surprised one and all in 1984 by entering New Zealand as represented by the Royal New Zealand Yacht Squadron as a challenger for the America's Cup. Soon thereafter Falcher was forced to leave New Zealand while being investigated by the New South Wales government on counts of fraud. The pieces of the challenge effort were picked up by businessman and financier Michael Fay, merchant banker and co-owner of Fay-Richwhite.

Combining experienced sailors under the leadership of Brad Butterworth with talented young match racer Chris Dickson, a team was assembled to compete in the 1985 12 Metre World Championships. The team made use of former US 12 Metre Enterprise (now registered as KZ 1). The exercise was intended to train up the crew for a future challenge at the Cup. During this time, planning and construction of the world's first fibreglass 12 Metre, New Zealand (KZ 3) was being constructed by Bruce Farr and would be the first in a series of fiberglass 12 Metre yachts, all named New Zealand and constructed with a view to the 1986 12 Metre World Championship and subsequent America's Cup. KZ 5 was completed shortly after KZ 3 and was shipped straight to Fremantle.

== 1986 12 Metre World Championship ==
The 1986 12 Metre Championships were staged off Fremantle as a precursor to the America's Cup event to be held a year later. KZ 7's sister boats KZ 3 and KZ 5 competed, with KZ 5 finishing runner-up behind the Bond Syndicate's Australia III, which was the comfortable winner. The boat finished ahead of the New York Yacht Club entry America II, a considerable achievement that made the sailing community stand-up and take notice that the New Zealand challenge was serious.

Information gained from KZ 3 and KZ 5 went into the planning of KZ 7. All three were designed by Farr Yacht Design, and comprised the first successful efforts of Bruce Farr in America's Cup Racing.

== The New GRP 12 Metres ==
While the 12 Metre Championships were going on, KZ 7 was being constructed at the Auckland boatyard of McMullen & Wing. Michael Fay instructed the signwriter to add, "Kiwi Magic" as the final touch to the stern of the boat. She then was shipped to Fremantle for sea testing alongside KZ 5, while KZ 3 was retired from competition. The selection of skipper was down to the two men that helmed KZ 3 and KZ 5 during the 1986 12 Metre World Championships, Graeme Woodroffe and Chris Dickson. Eventually it was announced that Chris Dickson was selected to skipper team New Zealand.

== Rounds Robin ==
KZ 7 was surprisingly successful through the rounds robin. The boat was clearly fast, well crewed and capably skippered. She went through the first round suffering but one loss, to Stars and Stripes 87. The second and third rounds saw her to be a consistently fast sailor, losing not another match race. Through three rounds she had thirty-three wins in thirty-four starts. Kiwi Magic had the highest point total and was the clear leader of the challenger series.

== Glassgate ==
Prior to the Louis Vuitton Cup protests were lodged by the French Kiss team, challenging whether KZ 7 was in compliance with the 12 Metre formula. A Lloyd's Register of Shipping had been present throughout the construction of the boats, and he had checked each part of the laminate and the amount and type of resin used against the building schedule which Lloyd's had approved. As the round robins progressed and the New Zealanders continued to be fast, the controversy surrounding the fiberglass hulled boat intensified, brought famously to the fore at a media conference where Tom Blackaller and Dennis Conner answered questions about their concerns of whether or not the fiberglass boat met the 12 Metre standard. At one point Conner stated "There have been seventy-eight 12 Metres built, all in aluminum. Why would you want to build one in glass... unless you wanted to cheat." New Zealand had twice been measured, and twice certified by Lloyds before the first race of the series. Some small holes were drilled into the hull to check thickness, and the hull ultra-sonically checked for pockets of air in the construction of Kiwi Magic. All proved negative. These were provided for inspection by race officials. The boat was found to have a hull thickness consistent with the 12 Metre formula and the matter was settled.

== Louis Vuitton Cup Semifinals and Finals ==
KZ 7 was the top qualifier of the round robins, followed in the points competition by Stars and Stripes 87, USA and French Kiss. In the Challenger semi-finals KZ 7 easily defeated French Kiss 4–0, with none of the races closely contested. Meanwhile, a far more spirited competition between Stars and Stripes 87 and USA ensued, with USA leading all of the first race till the final mark. In the end the overall result was the same, with Stars and Stripes 87 coming away the winner, taking the series 4–0.

Going into the Louis Vuitton Finals, Kiwi Magic was the clear favorite, having won thirty-seven of her previous thirty-eight races. The boats were very closely matched, but by this point in the regatta Stars and Stripes 87 was showing a slight edge in speed going to windward, especially in heavy airs and seas. In the most tightly contested series of the regatta, Stars and Stripes 87 took the series, four wins to one.

== Aftermath & Crew changes ==
Stars and Stripes 87 went on to defeat Kookaburra III, 4–0 to reclaim the America's Cup.

The New Zealanders meanwhile regrouped and returned to race in the 1987 World Championships in Sardinia, Italy. For the regatta Chris Dickson and Brad Butterworth were taken off boat, replaced with David Barnes as skipper while future NZL 20 skipper Rod Davis acted as tactician.

The New Zealanders sailed competitively, and ended up winning the event in the protest room, achieving victory over the Japanese entry Bengal (previously the Bond syndicate's Australia III). Kiwi Magic won the last two fleet races in the series, the three semifinal races and two out of the three final races against Bengal.

== After the America's Cup ==
Since competing in the America's Cup KZ 7 has been chartered by a number of sailors, including Bill Koch (Skipper of America 3 1992 America's Cup winner) and Patrizio Bertelli (Luna Rossa syndicate head), who went on to win World 12 Metre titles on-board Kiwi Magic. Both men were tempted to change the name of the boat but declined due to their respect for the boat's history in the America's Cup and the affection and pride felt for her by all of New Zealand.

Post the 1987 America's Cup challenger series, Kiwi Magic KZ 7 was donated to the US Merchant Marine Academy's Sailing Foundation for the offshore sailing program at the school. In 2016 the yacht was sold to Mr. Johan Blach Petersen, of Aarhus, Denmark and is now actively racing in the growing Baltic 12 Metre fleet.
