= 1983 Louis Vuitton Cup =

1st Louis Vuitton Cup
Event information
- Type: Challenge race for America's Cup
- Dates: 11 August – 8 September 1983
- Host city: Newport, Rhode Island
- Boats: Australia II; Victory (United Kingdom); Challenge 12; Azzurra (Italy); France 3 Secret Cove Yacht Club Challenge (Canada); Advance

Results
- Winner: Australia II

Succession
- Previous: 1980 Herbert Pell Cup
- Next: 1987 Louis Vuitton Cup

The 1983 Louis Vuitton Cup was held in Newport, Rhode Island, United States in 1983. The winner, Australia II, went on to challenge for the 1983 America's Cup.

== The teams ==
Club	Team	Skipper	Yachts
(Australia) Royal Perth Yacht Club	Australia II	(Australia) John Bertrand	Australia II (KA–6)
(United Kingdom) Royal Burnham Yacht Club	Victory	(United Kingdom) Phil Crebbin, Lawrie Smith and Rodney Pattisson	Victory of Burnham (K–21), Victory '83 (K–22)
(Australia) Royal Yacht Club of Victoria	Challenge 12	(Australia) John Savage	Challenge 12 (KA–10)
(Italy) Yacht Club Costa Smeralda	Azzurra	(Italy) Cino Ricci (Mauro Pelaschier)	Azzurra (I–4)
Yacht Club de France	France 3	(France) Bruno Troublé	France 3 (F-3)
(Canada) Secret Cove Yacht Club	Secret Cove Yacht Club Challenge	(Canada) Terry McLaughlin	Canada I (KC–1)
(Australia) Royal Sydney Yacht Squadron	Advance	(Australia) Iain Murray	Advance (KA-7)

=== Australia II (AUS) ===
Owned by Alan Bond and helmed by John Bertrand, Australia II featured an innovative winged keel design developed by Ben Lexcen which helped to make it point higher, sail faster and be quicker in coming about. The boat was innovative in a number of ways, but the winged keel was the most striking design advance and the distinguishing feature of the boat. The New York Yacht Club challenged the legality of the keel design, but it was ruled to be legal. Australia II dominated the Louis Vuitton Cup and took the trophy, earning the right to compete in the 1983 America's Cup.

The Australia II team was: William Baillieu, Colin Beashall, Ken Beashall, John Bertrand, Alan Bond, Rob Brown, Peter Costello, Damian Fewster, John Fitzhardinge, Michael Fletcher, Lesleigh Green, James Hardy, Stephen Harrison, Laurie Hayden, Warren Jones, Kenneth Judge, Phillip Judge, Ben Lexcen, Cole (Skip) Lissiman, John Longley, Scott McAllister, Ken O'Brien, Michael Quilter, Glenn Read, David Rees, Mark Reid, Brian Richardson, Newton Roberts, Tom Schnackenberg, Edward Silbereisen, Grant Simmer, Phillip Smidmore, Hugh Treharne and David Wallace.

=== Victory (GBR) ===
Peter de Savary funded the Royal Burnham Yacht Club's Victory Syndicate. The team used three skippers over the Cup: Phil Crebbin, Lawrie Smith and Rodney Pattisson. The crew included Chris Law, Robin Fuger, Harold Cudmore, who quit the campaign before the start of the Cup, and future America's Cup Hall of Famer Dean Phipps, racing in his first America's Cup.

Two boats were constructed; Victory of Burnham (K 21), Victory '83 (K 22), although K 22 was ultimately used in the Cup. The team also purchased two boats from the 1980 Herbert Pell Cup to use in trials; Australia (renamed as Temeraire) and Lionheart.

=== Challenge 12 (AUS) ===
Owned by a number of Australian businessmen from Victoria headed by Dick Pratt. Challenge 12 was also designed by Lexcen and sold to the Victorian challenge after the Bond syndicate selected Australia II. She was a fast, traditional 12 Meter, and lacked the winged keel of her sister boat Australia II. John Bertrand favored her initially, but was talked into sailing the new design by Alan Bond. She may have been superior to Australia II in heavy winds, and was a real threat to the men from the West of Australia.

During the Louis Vuitton Cup, Challenge 12 was skippered by John Savage and the crew included Graeme 'Frizzle' Freeman, Michael Fletcher (later Australia II's sailing coach) and Damian Fewster (who later sailed with Australia II in the America's Cup victory as a replacement crew member).

Challenge 12 was later used to prepare Australia II for the America's Cup and was skippered by James Hardy.

=== Azzurra (ITA) ===
Managed by Luca Cordero di Montezemolo and funded by Aga Khan IV and Gianni Agnelli, Azzurra was formed in 1982. Ambrosini was involved with the construction of the yacht Azzurra (I-4), and they proved to be a competitive new challenge. Skippered by Cino Ricci and with Mauro Pelaschier on the helm, the original Azzurra team won 24 of 49 races and developed a large and loyal following in Italy.

=== France 3 (FRA) ===
France 3, skippered by Bruno Troublé, returned for its second challenge for the America's Cup. The syndicate was financed by Yves Roussert-Rouard who had purchased the boat from Marcel Bich who had financed the first four French challenges. The syndicate was hampered by money problems and an inexperienced crew.

=== Canada (CAN) ===
Canada returned to the Cup as a challenger for the first time in over a hundred years. Their boat Canada would be completely revamped and compete again three years later at the 1987 Cup as Canada II.

=== Advance (AUS) ===
A Sydney challenger owned and run by Australian sailing legend, Syd Fischer. A slow design by Alan Payne, the designer of Gretel I and II. Skippered by 18-foot skiff champion, Iain Murray.

== Finals ==
=== Semi-finals ===
11 – 24 August
In the semi-finals the four qualifiers sailed against each other competitor three times. Australia II and Victory '83 advanced to the finals.

	AUS	VIC	AZZ	CAN	Points
Australia II		2	3	3	8
(United Kingdom) Victory '83	1		2	3	6
(Italy) Azzurra	0	1		3	4
Canada	0	0	0		0

=== Final ===
28 August – 8 September
Australia II defeated Victory '83 4–1 in the final to win the Louis Vuitton Cup and go on to compete in the America's Cup.

Team	I	II	III	IV	V	Pts
Australia II	0	W	W	W	W	4
(United Kingdom) Victory '83	W	0	0	0	0	1
