= List of 12-metre yachts =

This is a list of 12-metre yachts.

		Yr. Launched	Launched Name	Designer	Builder			
AUS 01	KA–1	1962	Gretel	Alan Payne	Lars Holvorsen Sons. Pty. Ltd.			
AUS 02	KA–2	1966	Dame Pattie	Warwick J. Hood	William H. Barnett Pty. Ltd.			
AUS 03	KA–3	1970	Gretel II	Alan Payne	Lars Holvorsen Sons. Pty. Ltd.			
AUS 04	KA–4	1974	Southern Cross	Miller & Whitworth	Halvorsen, Morson & Gowland			
AUS 05	KA–5	1977	Australia	Bob Miller & Johan Valentijn	Steve E. Ward & Brian Raley			
AUS 06	KA–6	1982	Australia II	Ben Lexcen	Steve E. Ward & Co.			
AUS 07	KA–7	1983	Advance	Alan Payne	Aquacraft & Co. Ltd	AUS	Royal Sydney Yacht Club	
AUS 08	KA–8	1985	South Australia	Ben Lexcen	Steve E. Ward & Co.			
AUS 09	KA–9	1985	Australia III	Ben Lexcen	Steve E. Ward & Co.			
AUS 10	KA–10	1982	Challenge 12	Ben Lexcen	Steve E. Ward & Co.			
AUS 11	KA–11	1985	Kookaburra	Iain Murray & John Swarbrick	Parry Boat Builder			
AUS 12	KA–12	1985	Kookaburra II	Iain Murray & John Swarbrick	Parry Boat Builder			
AUS 14	KA–14	1986	Steak 'n' Kidney	Peter Cole	Consolidated Marine			
AUS 15	KA–15	1986	Kookaburra III	Iain Murray & John Swarbrick	Parry Boat Builder			
AUS 16	KA–16	1986	Australia IV	Ben Lexcen	Steve E. Ward & Co.			
CAN 01	KC–1	1982	Canada One	Bruce Kirby	Fred McConnell Marine, Ltd.			
CAN 02	KC–2	1985	Canada II	Bruce Kirby	Fred McConnell Marine, Ltd.		Secret Cove Yacht Club	
CAN 87	KC–87	1985	True North	Steve Killing	Crockett-McDonnel, Inc.			
DEN 01	D–1		Thea					
DEN-12	D–12	2013	Siesta	Johan Anker	Robbe & Berking Classics (GER)			
FRA 01	F–1	1970	France	Andre Mauric	Herman Egger, Chantier AFCA			
FRA		1973 / N/A	France 2 Project	Paul Elvstrom & Jan Kjaerulff	Herman Egger, Chantier AFCA			
FRA 02	F–2	1977	France II	Andre Mauric	Herman Egger, Chantier AFCA			
FRA 03	F–3	1979	France III	Johan Valentijn	Chantiers Dufour			
FRA 04	F–4	1969	Chancegger	Britton Chance Jr.	Chantier Naval Hermann Egger			
FRA 07	F–7	1985	French Kiss	P. Briand, P. Perrier, D. Chaumette	Alubat			
FRA 08	F–8	1986	Challenge France	Daniel Andrieu	Alsthom Chantier Atlantique			
GBR		1911	Ierne	William Fife III	W. Fife & Son			
GBR	K–1	1923	Vanity	William Fife	W. Fife & Son			Identity from williamfife.com
GBR 01	K–1		Jenetta	Alfred Mylne & Co.	Bute Slip Dock Co., Ltd.			
GBR 02	K–2 and K–12	1936	Evaine	Charles E. Nicholson	Camper & Nicholson Ltd.			
GBR 03	K–3	1926	Moyana	W. & R.B. Fife	W. Fife & Son			
GBR 03	K–3	1929	Moyana	W. & R.B. Fife	W. Fife & Son			
GBR 03	K–3	1964	Ikra	David Boyd	Alexander Robertson & Sons Yacht Builders Ltd.			
GBR 05	K–5		Vanity					
GBR 10	K–10		Trivia'					
GBR 12	K–12	1963	Sovereign	David Boyd	Alexander Robertson & Sons Yacht Builders Ltd.			
GBR 14	K–14		Flica II					
GBR 15	K–15		Wings					
GBR 16	K–16		Flica					
GBR 17	K–17	1958	Sceptre	David Boyd	Alexander Robertson & Sons Yacht Builders Ltd.			
GBR 18	K–18		Lionheart					
GBR 21	K–21	1982	Victory of Burnham	Edward Dubois	William A. Souter & Son			
GBR 22	K–22	1983	Victory '83	Ian Howlett	Fairey Allday Marine			
GBR 24	K–24	1985	White Crusader	Ian Howlett	Cougar Marine			
GBR 25	K–25	1986	White Crusader 2	David H.J. Hollom	Cougar Marine			
GER	E–3		Heti					
GER	E–8		Erna Signe					
GER 05		1908	Skeaf II	G. Barg	Actien Gessselschaft Neptun (Rostock)			
GER		1909	Skeaf III	G. Barg	Actien Gessselschaft Neptun (Rostock)			
GER	E–5	1910	Skeaf IV	G. Barg	Actien Gessselschaft Neptun (Rostock)			
GER		1912	Skeaf V	G. Barg	Actien Gessselschaft Neptun (Rostock)			
GER	E-2	1914	Skeaf VI	William Fife III	Abeking & Rasmussen			
GER 01	G–1	1938	Inga	Henry Rasmussen	Abeking & Rasmussen			
GER 02	G–2	1938	Anita	Henry Rasmussen	Abeking & Rasmussen			
GER 04	G–4	1939	Sphinx	Henry Rasmussen	Abeking & Rasmussen			
ITA 01	I–1	1929	La Spina	Vincenzo Vittorio Baglietto	Cantieri Baglietto			
ITA 02	I–2	1930	Emilia	Atillio Costaguta	Cantieri Costaguta (Genova Voltri)			
ITA 04	I–4	1982	Azzurra	Andrea Vallicelli & Co.	Off. Meccaniche Ing. Mario Cobau			
ITA 07	I–7	1985	Italia	Giorgetti & Magrini	Cantieri Ferri			
ITA 08	I–8	1985	Azzurra II	Studio Andrea Vallicelli	Industrie Meccaniche Scardellato			
ITA 09	I–9	1986	Italia II	Giorgetti & Magrini	Cantieri Ferri			
ITA 10	I–10		Azzurra III					
ITA 11	I–11	1986	Azzurra IV	Studio Andrea Vallicelli	S.A.I. Ambrosini			
NOR	N–2	1914	Symra	Anker & Jensen				
NOR 11	N–11		Vema III					
NZL 03	KZ–3	1985	Kiwi	Laurie Davidson, Bruce Farr, Ron Holland	McMullen & Wing			
NZL 05	KZ–5	1985	New Zealand	Laurie Davidson, Bruce Farr, Ron Holland	Marten Marine			
NZL 07	KZ–7	1986	Kiwi Magic	Laurie Davidson, Bruce Farr, Ron Holland	Marten Marine & McMullen & Wing			
SWE 02	S–2		Princess Svanevit					
SWE 03	S–3		Sverige					
SWE 05	S–5		New Sweden					
US3 01	US–1	1928	Waiandance	Burgess, Rigg & Morgan Ltd	Abeking & Rasmussen			
US3 02	US–2	1928	Isis	Burgess, Rigg & Morgan Ltd	Abeking & Rasmussen			
US3 03	US–3	1928	Tycoon	Burgess, Rigg & Morgan Ltd	Abeking & Rasmussen			
US3 04	US–4	1928	Iris	Burgess, Rigg & Morgan Ltd	Abeking & Rasmussen			
USA 05	US–5	1928	Anitra	Burgess, Rigg & Morgan Ltd	Abeking & Rasmussen			
USA 06	US–6	1928	Onawa	Burgess, Rigg & Morgan Ltd	Abeking & Rasmussen			
USA 09	US–9	1935	Seven Seas of Porto	Clinton Crane	Henry B. Nevins, Inc.			
USA 10	US–10	1935	Mitena	L. Francis Herreshoff	Herreshoff Mfg. Co.			
USA 11	US–11	1935	Gleam	L. Francis Herreshoff	Herreshoff Mfg. Co.			
USA 12	US–12	1938	Nyala	Olin J. Stephens	Henry B. Nevins, Inc.			
USA 14	US–14	1938	Northern Light	Olin J. Stephens	Henry B. Nevins, Inc.			
USA 15	US–15	1939	Vim	Olin J. Stephens	Nevins Yacht Yard Inc.			
USA 16	US–16	1958	Columbia	Olin J. Stephens	Nevins Yacht Yard Inc.			
USA 17	US–17	1958	Weatherly	Philip Rhodes	Luders Marine Construction Co.			
USA 18	US–18	1958	Easterner	C. Raymond Hunt & F.C. Williams Assoc.	James E. Graves Inc.			
USA 19	US–19	1962	Nefertiti	Frederick E. Hood	James E.Gravies, Inc. & Little Harbor Yard			
USA 20	US–20	1964	Constellation	Olin J. Stephens	Minneford Yacht Yard Inc.			
USA 21	US–21	1964	American Eagle	A.E. Luders, Jr.	Luders Marine Construction Co.			
USA 22	US–22	1967	Intrepid	Olin J. Stephens	Minneford Yacht Yard Inc.			
USA 23	US–23	1970	Heritage	Charles E. Morgan Jr.	Morgan Yacht Corp.			
USA 24	US–24	1970	Valiant	Olin J. Stephens	Robert E. Derecktor Yacht Yard			
USA 25	US–25	1974	Mariner	Britton Chance Jr.	Robert E. Derecktor Yacht Yard			
USA 26	US–26	1974	Courageous	Olin J. Stephens	Minneford Yacht Yard Inc.			
USA 27	US–27	1977	Enterprise	Sparkman & Stephens	Minneford Yacht Yard Inc.			
USA 28	US–28	1976	Independence	Frederick E. Hood	Minneford Yacht Yard Inc.			
USA 30	US–30	1979	Freedom	Olin J. Stephens	Minneford Yacht Yard Inc.			
USA 32	US–32	1980	Clipper	David R. Pedrick	Newport Offshore, Ltd.			
USA 33	US–33	1982	Defender	David R. Pedrick	Newport Offshore, Ltd.			
USA 34	US–34	1982	Spirit of America	Sparkman & Stephens	Newport Offshore, Ltd.			
USA 38	US–38	1982	Magic	Johan Valentijn	Custom Marine & Pilots Point Marina			
USA 40	US–40		Liberty					
USA 42	US–42	1984	America II	M. William Langan-Sparkman & Stephens	Williams & Manchester Shipyard			
USA 44	US–44	1985	America II	M. William Langan-Sparkman & Stephens	Williams & Manchester Shipyard			
USA 46	US–46	1986	America II	M. William Langan-Sparkman & Stephens	Williams & Manchester Shipyard			
USA 49	US–49	1985	USA E-1	Gary Mull	Stephens Marine		Golden Gate Yacht Club	
USA 51	US–51	1986	Heart of America	Gretzky, Graham, MacLane, Schlageter	Merrifield-Roberts, Inc.			
USA 53	US–53	1983	Stars & Stripes 83	B. Chance Jr., B. Nelson, D. Pedrick	Geraghty Marine			
USA 54	US–54	1985	Stars & Stripes 85	B. Chance Jr., B. Nelson, D. Pedrick	Robert E. Derecktor, Inc.			
USA 55	US–55	1986	Stars & Stripes 87	B. Chance Jr., B. Nelson, D. Pedrick	Robert E. Derecktor, Inc.			
USA 56	US–56	1986	Stars & Stripes 86	B. Chance Jr., B. Nelson, D. Pedrick	Robert E. Derecktor, Inc.			
USA 60	US–60	1986	Eagle	Johan Valentijn	Williams & Manchester Shipyard			
USA 61	US–61		USA R-1	Gary Mull	Robert E. Derecktor, Inc.			
