= Italy at the America's Cup =

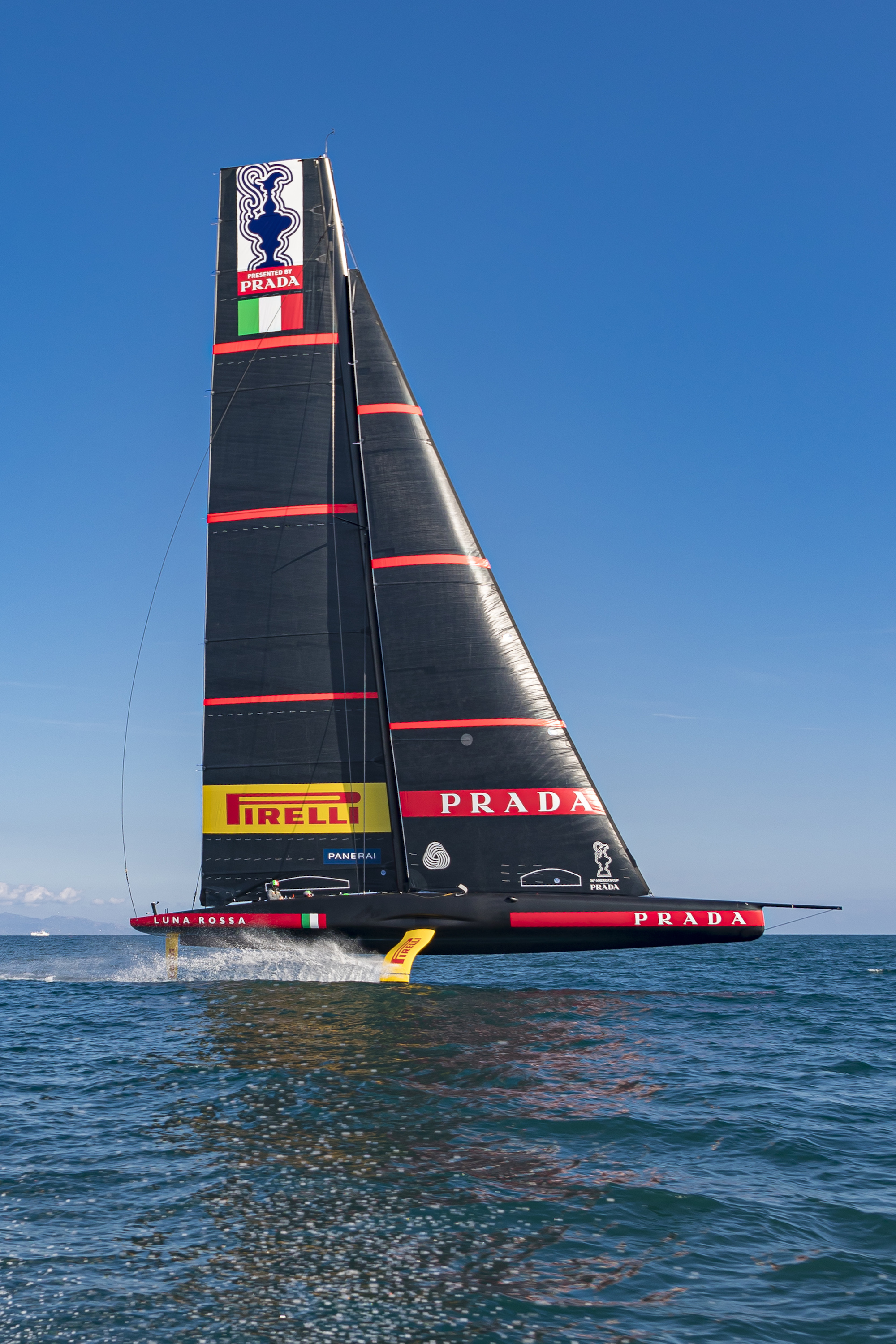
Luna Rossa's AC75 training in Cagliari in 2019.

Since the 1980s, Italy has been a serious challenge contender for the America's Cup. Italian teams have won the Challenger Selection Series three times: the Louis Vuitton Cup in 1992 with Il Moro di Venezia, in 2000 with Luna Rossa and the Prada Cup in 2021, again with Luna Rossa.

Italy thus took on the official role of challenger and gained the right to challenge the defender in America's Cup. However, it was defeated on all three occasions.

== Italy in the Challenger Selection Series ==
Italy first participated in the 1983 Louis Vuitton Cup with the yacht Azzurra. Since then, at least one Italian syndicate has entered every edition of the challenger selection series (known as Louis Vuitton Cup from 1983 to 2013 and in 2024, Prada Cup in 2021), except for the 1995 Louis Vuitton Cup. While Luna Rossa Challenge had originally entered the 2017 Louis Vuitton Cup, it withdrew in protest when the class of boats for the competition was changed without unanimous consent of all participants.

In three occasions, multiple Italian teams entered in the same year: two in the 1987 Louis Vuitton Cup, two in the 2003 Louis Vuitton Cup and three in the 2007 Louis Vuitton Cup.

Three Italian yachts ever won the challenger selection series, earning the right to challenge for the America's Cup: Il Moro di Venezia in 1992, Luna Rossa in 2000 and Luna Rossa again in 2021.

Year	Venue	Yachting club	Boat	Skipper	Result	Winner	Notes
1983	(United States) Newport	Yacht Club Costa Smeralda	Azzurra (12 Metre I-4)	Cino Ricci	3rd	Australia II	
1987	(Australia) Fremantle	Yacht Club Costa Smeralda	Azzurra III (12 Metre I-11)	Cino Ricci	11th	(United States) Stars and Stripes 87	
1987	(Australia) Fremantle	Yacht Club Italiano	Italia (12 Metre I-7)	Flavio Scala and Aldo Migliaccio	7th	(United States) Stars and Stripes 87	
1992	(United States) San Diego	Compagnia della Vela	Il Moro di Venezia V (IACC ITA-25)	Paul Cayard	Winner		
1995	(United States) San Diego	No Italian team entered the 1995 Louis Vuitton Cup					
2000	(New Zealand) Auckland	Yacht Club Punta Ala	Luna Rossa (IACC ITA-45)	Francesco de Angelis	Winner		
2003	(New Zealand) Auckland	Yacht Club Punta Ala	Luna Rossa (IACC ITA-74)	Francesco de Angelis	Semifinalist	(Switzerland) Alinghi	
2003	(New Zealand) Auckland	Reale Yacht Club Canottieri Savoia	Mascalzone Latino (IACC ITA-72)	Paolo Cian	9th	(Switzerland) Alinghi	
2007	(Spain) Valencia	Yacht Club Italiano	Luna Rossa (IACC ITA-94)	Francesco de Angelis	Finalist	Team New Zealand	
2007	(Spain) Valencia	Reale Yacht Club Canottieri Savoia	Mascalzone Latino (IACC ITA-99)	Vasco Vascotto	6th	Team New Zealand	
2007	(Spain) Valencia	Circolo Vela Gargnano	+39 Challenge (IACC ITA-85)	Luca Devoti	9th	Team New Zealand	
2013	(United States) San Francisco	Circolo della Vela Sicilia	Luna Rossa (AC72)	Max Sirena	Finalist	Team New Zealand	
2017	Bermuda	Luna Rossa entered the 2017 Louis Vuitton Challenger's Trophy but then withdrew in protest.					
2021	(New Zealand) Auckland	Circolo della Vela Sicilia	Luna Rossa (AC75)	Max Sirena	Winner		
2024	(Spain) Barcelona	Circolo della Vela Sicilia	Luna Rossa (AC75 v2.0)	Max Sirena	Finalist	(United Kingdom) INEOS Britannia	

== Italy in the America's Cup match ==
Three Italian yachts earned the right to challenge for the America's Cup: Il Moro di Venezia in 1992, the first team from a non-English speaking nation to do so, Luna Rossa in 2000 and Luna Rossa again in 2021. In all three occasions, the Italian teams lost to the defending champion.

Year	Venue	Challenging club	Challenger	Skipper	Score	Defender	Defending Club	Notes
1992	(United States) San Diego	Compagnia della Vela	Il Moro di Venezia V (IACC ITA-25)	Paul Cayard	1-4	America³ (IACC USA-23)	San Diego Yacht Club	
2000	(New Zealand) Auckland	Yacht Club Punta Ala	Luna Rossa (IACC ITA-45)	Francesco de Angelis	0-5	Team New Zealand (IACC NZL-60)	Royal New Zealand Yacht Squadron	
2021	(New Zealand) Auckland	Circolo della Vela Sicilia	Luna Rossa (AC75)	Max Sirena	3-7	Te Rehutai (AC75)	Royal New Zealand Yacht Squadron	

== See also ==
- Azzurra
- Il Moro Challenge
- Luna Rossa Challenge
- Mascalzone Latino
- +39 Challenge
