= Louis Vuitton Cup =

Challenger Selection Series for the America's Cup

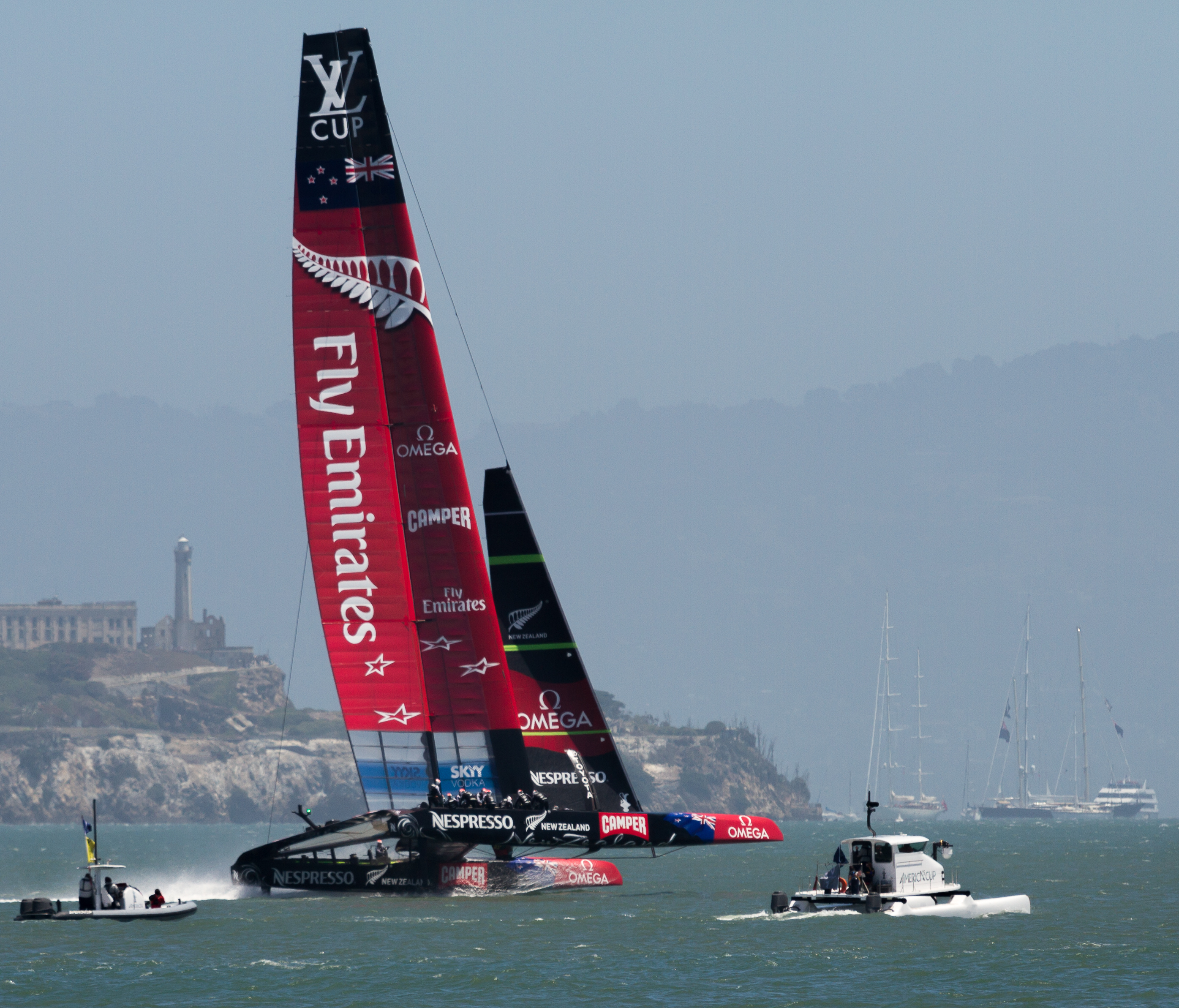
Team New Zealand at the 2013 Louis Vuitton Cup

The Louis Vuitton Cup is the name of the Challenger Selection Series sailing competition from 1983, named after its sponsor, Louis Vuitton. The winner of the competition became the challenger to compete with the defender of the America's Cup. The competition for the 2017 America's Cup changed format and name to the Louis Vuitton Challenger’s Trophy. The following series, in 2021, was named the Prada Cup after its new sponsor. In 2024 the challenger selection series will again be named after Louis Vuitton. Five out of the ten winners of the Louis Vuitton Cup competitions subsequently won the America's Cup itself.

== History ==
In 1970, for the first time in America's Cup history, multiple "international" challengers competed for the right to challenge the New York Yacht Club, the defender of the America's Cup (the key word being "international": in 1964, for example, two British challengers competed for the right to challenge the NYYC.)

For the 1983 America's Cup match, the Royal Sydney Yacht Squadron, the "Challenger of Record", contracted with New York Yacht Club member, Paul Madden, to create "The Challenger's Cup". Paul Madden then contracted with Louis Vuitton to be the first sponsor of this Cup series that led up to the main event. Louis Vuitton offered a trophy to the winner of the challenger selection series; the idea was Paul Madden's, but is generally credited to Bruno Trouble, a French yachtsman. The initial Louis Vuitton Cup was contested off Newport, United States, with Australia II prevailing, thereby earning the right to meet the NYYC’s defending yacht Liberty in that year’s America’s Cup.

With the exception of the America's Cup races in 1988 and 2010, the winner of the Louis Vuitton Cup has been awarded the right to challenge the current defender for the America's Cup. During the 1992 and 1995 regattas Citizen Watch offered a trophy to the winner of the defender selection series (the Citizen Cup) as the defense’s counterpart to the Louis Vuitton cup.

Due to the large number of challengers in recent decades the Louis Vuitton Cup has had to eliminate challengers in two phases. A round-robin points accruing phase, and then a pair of semi-finals involving the top four, followed by a final between the top two. The semi-finals and finals are a best of nine races between two boats.

Between the 2004 and 2007 Cups, Louis Vuitton sponsored thirteen "acts" of competition, with the first three acts not awarding points toward rankings. Some challengers do not enter the competition by the start of the acts. Rules for the current races (2005–2007) stipulate that ranking points awarded for each act of competition will increase as they get closer to the final. For acts taking place in 2005, standard points were awarded, with 11 ranking points for a first-place finish, and points awarded decreasing based on placing. Acts in 2006 double the points, with 22 ranking points for first place, and the final act 13 which takes place in 2007 will award triple points, giving 33 points to the winner.

History shows that the Louis Vuitton Cup series enhances the chances of the challenger due to the intense racing against different opponents which improves the tactics and crew co-ordination of the winner. Differences in boat speed are becoming less and less, placing an even greater premium on reliability, superior tactics, and crewing. In the weeks leading up to the America's Cup competition, the defender has to mainly practice using in-house racing which can never be as intense as real competition.

In July 2007, Louis Vuitton announced termination of all its sponsorship activities associated with the America's Cup after 25 years of involvement, arguing the organisation of the America's Cup was taken over by business under the rule of Ernesto Bertarelli, leader of Alinghi, winner in 2003. Louis Vuitton instead sponsored the Louis Vuitton Pacific Series and Louis Vuitton Trophy.

After Oracle Racing won the America's Cup for the Golden Gate Yacht Club in the 2010 Deed-of-Gift race against Alinghi, Louis Vuitton again sponsored the challenger series for the 34th America's Cup which was held in 2013 on the San Francisco Bay.

Louis Vuitton also sponsored the heats to the 2013 and 2017 America's Cups; These "world series" were sailed in smaller 45 ft wingsail catamarans, the AC45. Participation was compulsory to take part in the Louis Vuitton Cup.

== Louis Vuitton Cup results ==
Rule	Year	Venue	Winning club	Winning syndicate	Losing club	Losing syndicate	Score
IYRU 12mR	1983	Newport, United States	Royal Perth Yacht Club	America's Cup Challenge '83 (Australia II), KA-6	Royal Burnham Yacht Club	(United Kingdom) Victory Challenge (Victory '83)	4–1
IYRU 12mR	1987	Fremantle, Australia	San Diego Yacht Club	(United States) Sail America Foundation, US-55	Royal New Zealand Yacht Squadron	New Zealand Challenge	4–1
	1988	uncontested, America's Cup challenger of record only					
IACC	1992	San Diego, United States	Compagnia della Vela di Venezia	(Italy) Il Moro di Venezia, ITA-16	Royal New Zealand Yacht Squadron	New Zealand Challenge	5–3
IACC	1995	San Diego, United States	Royal New Zealand Yacht Squadron	Team New Zealand, NZL-32	Southern Cross Yacht Club	One Australia	5–1
IACC	2000	Auckland, New Zealand	Yacht Club Punta Ala	(Italy) Prada Challenge, ITA-45	St. Francis Yacht Club	(United States) AmericaOne	5–4
IACC	2003	Auckland, New Zealand	Société Nautique de Genève	(Switzerland) Alinghi, SUI-64	Golden Gate Yacht Club	(United States) BMW Oracle	5–1
IACC	2007	Valencia, Spain	Royal New Zealand Yacht Squadron	Emirates Team New Zealand, NZL-92	Yacht Club Italiano	(Italy) Luna Rossa Challenge	5–0
	2010	uncontested, America's Cup challenger of record only					
AC72	2013	San Francisco, United States	Royal New Zealand Yacht Squadron	Emirates Team New Zealand, Aotearoa	Circolo della Vela Sicilia	(Italy) Luna Rossa Challenge	7–1
AC50	2017	Great Sound, Bermuda	Royal New Zealand Yacht Squadron	Emirates Team New Zealand, New Zealand	Kungliga Svenska Segelsällskapet	(Sweden) Artemis Racing, Magic Blue	5–2
AC75	2021	different sponsor see 2021 Prada Cup					
AC75	2024	Barcelona, Spain	Royal Yacht Squadron	(United Kingdom) INEOS Britannia	Circolo della Vela Sicilia	(Italy) Luna Rossa Challenge	7-4

indicates: won that year's America's Cup

== See also ==
- Citizen Cup - the defender series for America's Cup
- Herbert Pell Cup
- Italy at the America's Cup
