= Azzurra =

Yacht racing team

Career
- Yacht club: Yacht Club Costa Smeralda
- Established: 1982
- Nation: Italy
- Team principal(s): Riccardo Bonadeo
- Skipper: Cino Ricci
- Notable victories: Louis Vuitton Trophy Nice Côte d’Azur

Yachts
- Sail no.: Boat name

Azzurra is a yacht racing team that competed in the America's Cup, the Audi MedCup and the 52 Super Series for the Italian Yacht Club Costa Smeralda.

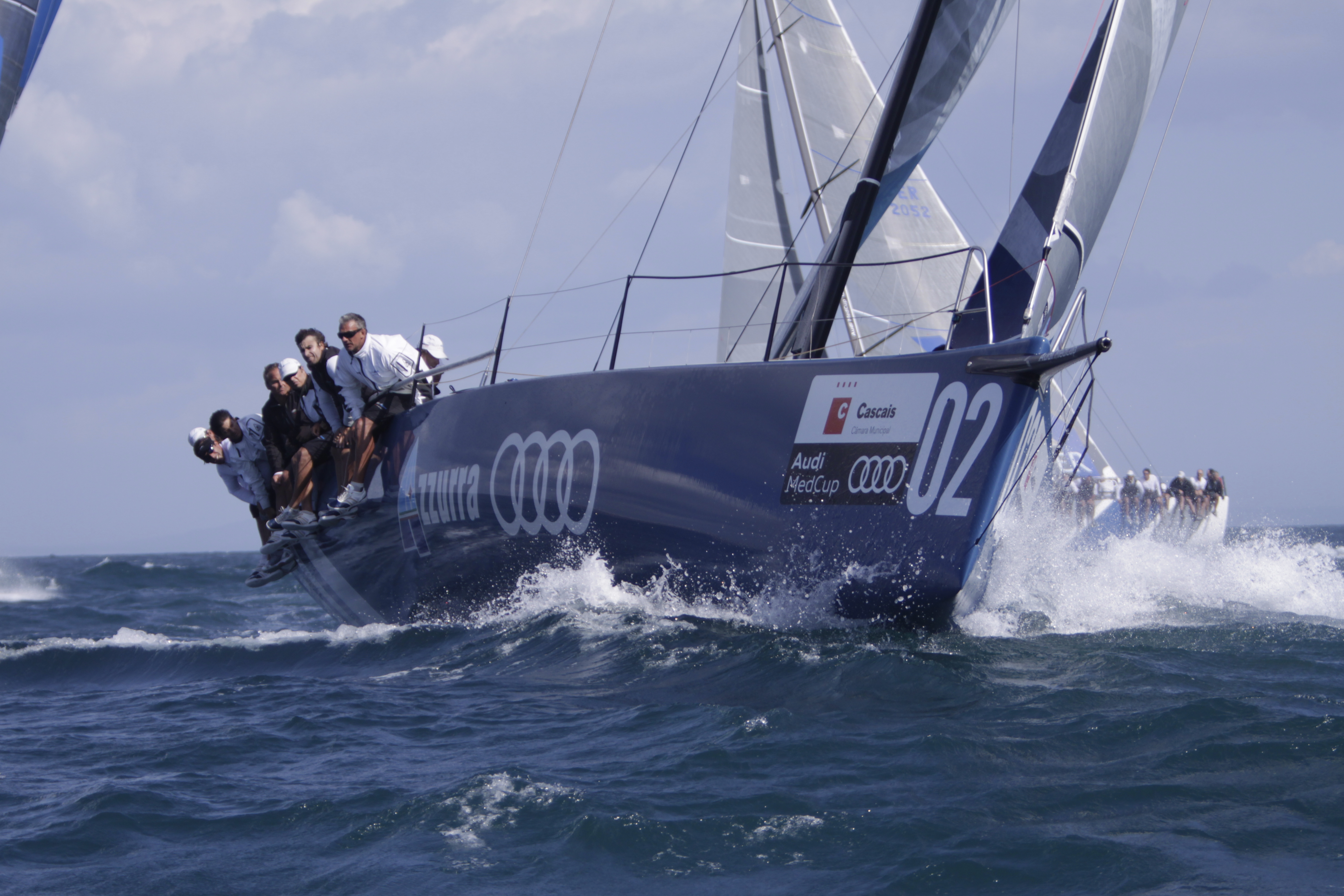

== History ==
Funded by business magnate Aga Khan IV and industrialist Gianni Agnelli, and managed by businessman Luca Cordero di Montezemolo, Azzurra began to compete in 1982. They competed in the 1983 Louis Vuitton Cup in Newport with Azzurra (I–4), but were not able to advance to the 1983 America's Cup. Aircraft manufacturer Ambrosini was involved in the construction of the yachts. Skippered by Cino Ricci and with Mauro Pelaschier at the helm, the original Azzurra team won 24 of 49 races and developed a large and loyal following in Italy.

After finishing fifth in the 1985 World Championships with Azzurra II (I–8) Azzurra financed the construction of two more boats for the 1987 America's Cup, Azzurra III (I–10) and Azzurra IV (I–11), and competed also in the 1987 Louis Vuitton Cup reaching the round robins stage.

In 2009 and 2010, the team sailed for the Louis Vuitton Trophy, and was relaunched for the Audi MedCup and the 52 Super Series.
