= Gleam =

Gleam may refer to:

== Music ==
- Gleam (album), by Freddie Hubbard, 1975
- The Gleam (album), a 1987 album by Steve Lacy
- The Gleam (EP), a 2006 EP by the Avett Brothers
- "Gleam" (single), a 2019 single by Mamamoo; see Mamamoo discography
- "The Gleam" (song), a 1987 song by Steve Lacy off the eponymous album The Gleam
- "Gleam" (song), a 2019 song by Moonbyul off Mamamoo

== Other uses ==
- Gleam (programming language), a statically typed functional programming language
- "The Gleam", a 1942 comic strip story that first gave the full name of Minnie Mouse
- Global LGBTQIA+ Employee & Allies at Microsoft
- A Gleam (foaled 1949), an American Thoroughbred racehorse
- A Gleam Invitational Handicap (1979–2013), a U.S. horserace
- Gleam (US-11), a 12m yacht; see List of 12-metre yachts
- GLEAM (Galactic and Extragalactic All-sky Murchison Widefield Array Survey), an astronomical survey at the International Centre for Radio Astronomy Research

== See also ==
- Advertiser-Gleam, a newspaper in Guntersville, Alabama, US
- The Arizona Gleam, a newspaper in Arizona, US; see List of newspapers in Arizona
- Gleem, a toothpaste brand
