= Peter de Savary =

British businessman and politician (1944–2022)

- Born: Peter John de Savary; 11 July 1944; Burnham-on-Crouch, Essex, England
- Died: 30 October 2022 (aged 78); Chelsea, London, England
- Education: Charterhouse School
- Occupations: Businessman; Yachtsman; Football Chairman

Peter John de Savary (11 July 1944 – 30 October 2022) was a British businessman in shipping, oil and property. He once owned or managed 13 shipyards around the globe and had global oil-trading and refuelling businesses. He was the Chairman of Millwall F.C.

In 1997, The Independent reported his fortune as £24 million, in the 1999 Sunday Times Rich List, he was placed in 971st place with an estimated fortune of £21 million and in 2002 £34 million. He was not listed in the top thousand places in subsequent editions.

== Life and career ==
=== Early life ===
De Savary was the son of a French-born Essex farmer, and was educated in Britain at Charterhouse, Godalming, from which he was expelled at the age of 16. He moved to Canada where his mother and stepfather lived; he did gardening, baby-sitting and children's private tuition. At the age of 18, with his wife Marcia, he moved back to the UK to work for his father. During a visit to Canada in 1969 he took over a small import-export agency, Afrex, that did business in Africa. On a subsequent flight to Nigeria he met the brother of the President of Nigeria with whom he went into business supplying wheat, flour, steel, cement and other goods to Nigeria and other African countries making him a millionaire by the age of 30.

De Savary purchased a part-ownership in a Kuwait-registered oil company called Artoc. With others he also started a bank in Nassau, Bahamas. The bank specialised in investing in property, shipping, oil refineries and coal mining in South America. The bank was not very successful and in 1980 lost $64 million. De Savary negotiated a deal with the Italian financier Roberto Calvi for Calvi to buy a 20% share in Artoc but Calvi was found hanged under Blackfriars Bridge in London in 1984 and de Savary left Artoc.

=== Clubs and property ===
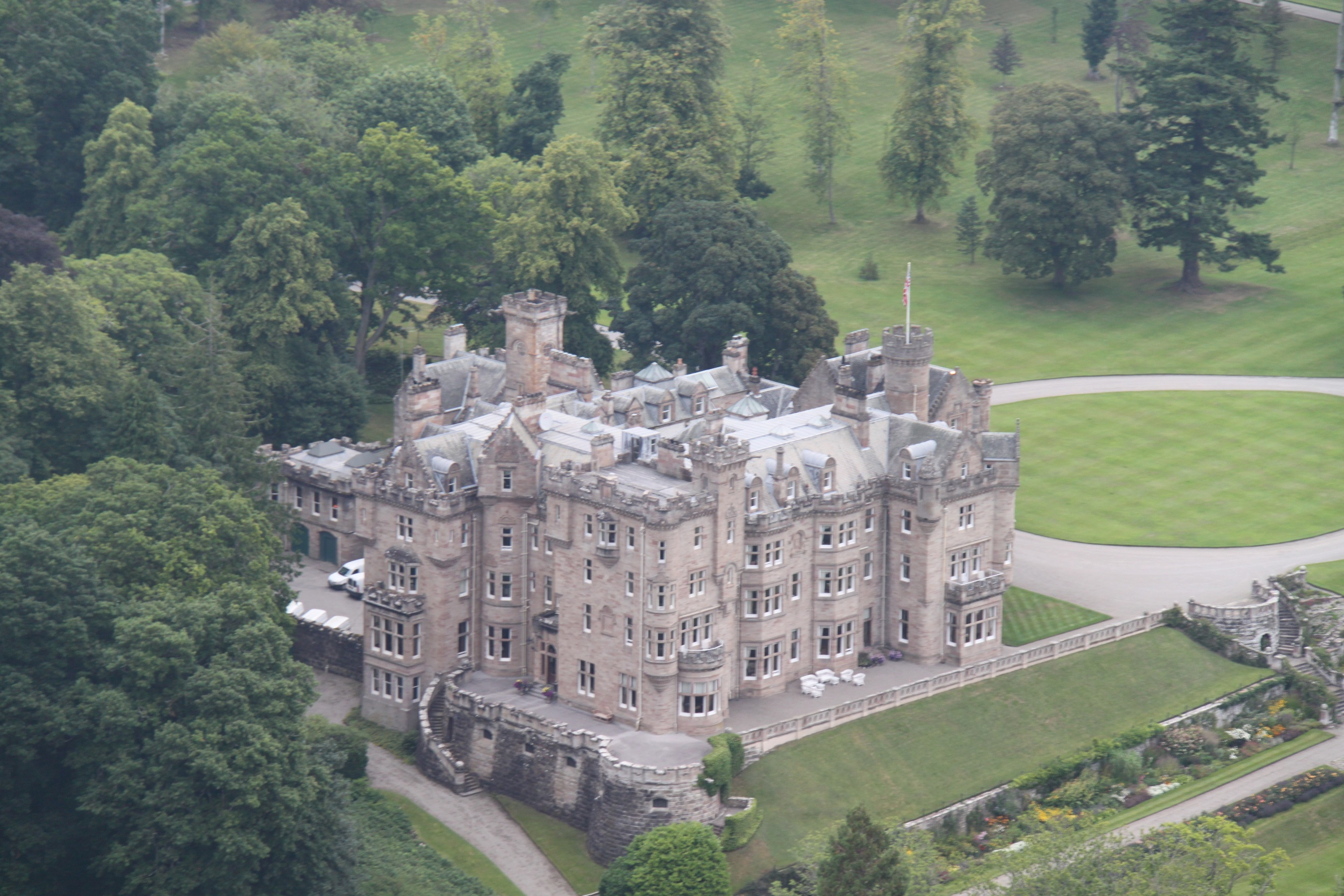
Skibo Castle in Sutherland, Scotland.

His first venture into hospitality was the St. James' Clubs in the late 1970s, in Los Angeles, London, Paris and Antigua, which he sold in the late 1980s to finance the £4m purchase of Skibo Castle. De Savary built up a large business empire in the 1980s, with property interests including Land's End and John o' Groats.

However, in the early 1990s economic downturn his empire collapsed – he sold both Land's End and John o' Groats in 1991 for an undisclosed sum to the businessman Graham Ferguson Lacey, and his holding company Placeton became insolvent in 1994 with debts of £200 million by one source and £715 million by another.

In 1997, he bought Vernon Court, a 14,000-square-foot in Newport RI. He planned to develop it into a members-only hotel similar to his Skibo Castle in Scotland. However, due to objection by neighbours the plans were dropped and the mansion was sold the following year.

=== 2000s ===
His business activities since 2000 concentrated on property development and hotels, with a number of major country house hotels incorporating golf courses. De Savary saw a niche for the affluent: leisure properties that were small enough to make guests feel as though they were on their own private estate, but equipped with all the facilities of the world's great hotels. His first such development was The Carnegie Club at Skibo Castle in Scotland, the venue for Madonna and Guy Ritchie's wedding. This was sold in 2003 to Ellis Short. Through his wife Lana's company, Havana West, other similar developments have included: the Cherokee Plantation in South Carolina; Stapleford Park and Bovey Castle, both in England; and Carnegie Abbey in Rhode Island. Each is a private club with golf courses and other amenities — clay pigeon shooting, falconry, horse riding, tennis — depending on what fits with the club's local environment.

Again with Lana's Havana West company he founded the Abaco Club at Winding Bay in Abaco, Bahamas, building a golf course at the location.

He bought four properties in Grenada in the Caribbean, where he developed a marina and resort village.

In late 2009, de Savary purchased a former YMCA located in Newport, RI, that had been converted into Vanderbilt Hall hotel. He added a small collection of American Illustration artworks to the property from the American Illustrators Gallery, New York, including a piece by Howard Chandler Christy titled "Jeanie with the Light Brown Hair". The painting depicts Stephen Foster composing the song of the same name. Other artists on display included Bradshaw Crandell, Constantin Alajalov, Helen Dryden, John Lagatta, George Hughes, Thomas Webb, Rico Tomaso, Carl Burger and Rolf Armstrong. The property was sold to Grace Hotels in 2010, then to Auberge Resorts Collection in 2018.

=== Yachting ===
De Savary led the British sailing team in its challenge for the America's Cup in 1983 but his contender, Victory 83, was beaten by Australia II in the final heat. In 1992 de Savary withdrew from the race as he could not raise the £2 million necessary to compete.

De Savary used the motor yacht Kalizma (formerly home to Elizabeth Taylor and Richard Burton during filming in London, named for their children) as a support vessel for the America's Cup races, but has since sold the ship. He also once owned the luxury yacht MY Land's End. In 1988 he founded Pendennis Shipyard in Falmouth, Cornwall, which builds and restores luxury yachts. He was responsible for the development of the new housing complex called Port Pendennis, also in Falmouth, which adjoins the shipyard there. He was also a sponsor of the Grenada Sailing Festival.

De Savary raced for many years in the Bucket Regatta in Newport, Rhode Island, and St Barts in the Caribbean. He was awarded the trophy "Spirit of the Bucket" in 2010. He was a member of the Royal Thames Yacht Club and the New York Yacht Club.

=== Football ===
In November 2005, he succeeded Theo Paphitis as chairman of Millwall Holdings plc and as chairman of Millwall F.C. Stewart Till succeeded him on 3 May 2006 as the football club chairman, and de Savary remained as chairman of Millwall Holdings plc until October 2006.

In March 2011, de Savary was linked with a deal to purchase the financially stricken League One club Plymouth Argyle F.C. However, de Savary denied any interest in buying the club, which was eventually purchased by Plymouth City Council the following October.

== Political activity ==
In 1997 De Savary stood as a Referendum Party candidate for Falmouth and Camborne. He came fourth receiving 3,534 (6.6%) votes.

== Personal life and death ==
De Savary was married three times. He had five daughters, two from his first marriage, and three from his second. His second wife was his personal assistant Alice Simms to whom he was married for a year. His third wife was Lana Paton, from Charleston, South Carolina.

In December 1987, after departing from St. Barthélemy in the Caribbean with his pilot, a nanny, his pregnant wife and his three daughters, their plane went into a stall, plunged into the Caribbean and landed upside down. The pilot died, and one of de Savary's daughters had to be revived on the beach. De Savary said, "At that point, my philosophy on life changed a little. When you genuinely look death in the eye, you know that nothing's going with you, and life is but a thread. It's a pretty tenuous thing we're hanging on to. So, what is the point of making money? I concluded it certainly isn't for accumulating it. That's the most stupid thing I ever heard of. So, there can be only one point, and that's to spend it. Now, I'm not ridiculously wasteful, but I may be slightly extravagant. As Andrew Carnegie said, 'to die rich is to die disgraced'."

De Savary died from a heart attack in London, on 30 October 2022, at the age of 78.
