= Royal Yacht Club of Victoria =

Yacht club in Melbourne, Victoria, Australia

Coordinates: 37.8626°S 144.9064°E

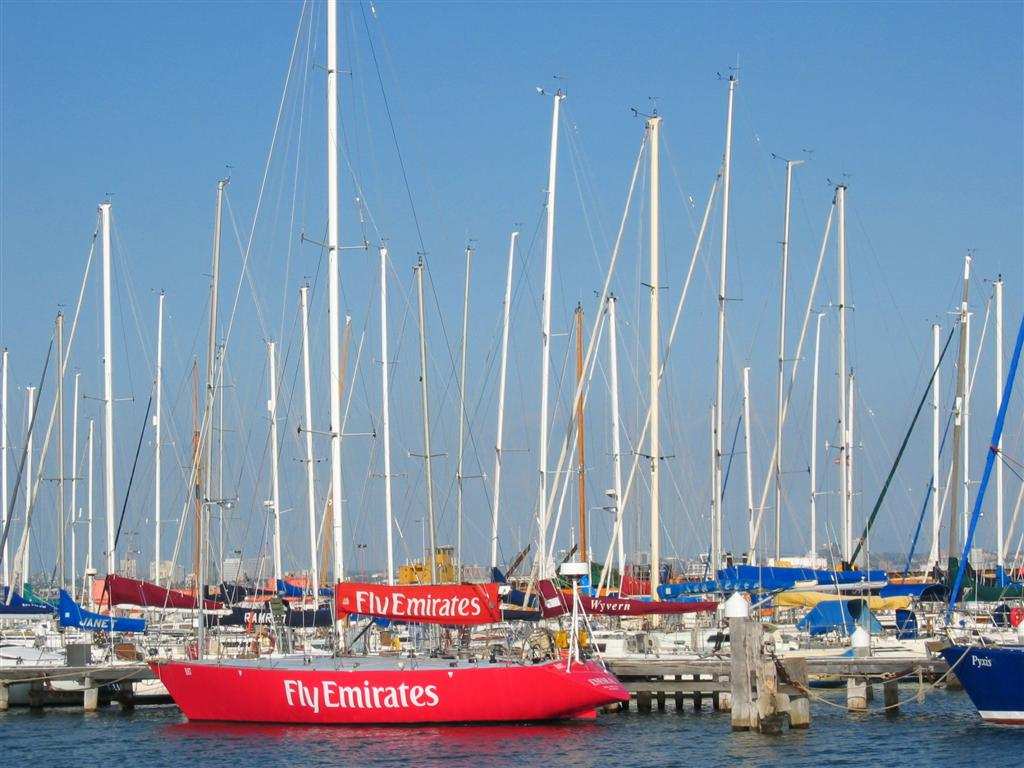
- Yachts moored near the clubhouse in 2005

- Burgee

- Ensign
- Short name: RYCV
- Founded: May 1853; 173 years ago (as Port Phillip Yacht Club)
- Location: Williamstown, Port Phillip Bay, Melbouren, Victoria, Australia
- Website: rycv.com.au

The Royal Yacht Club of Victoria (RYCV) is a yacht club located at Williamstown, on Port Phillip Bay, in the south-western suburbs of Melbourne, in Victoria, Australia. It is the oldest yacht club in Australia. The clubhouse is located not far from where the Yarra River flows into Port Phillip Bay.

== History ==
The club was founded in May 1853 as the Port Phillip Yacht Club, and is the oldest yacht club in Australia. By 1856, it had been renamed Victoria Yacht Club, and in that year it held its first regatta. Early members included W. R. Probert and George F. Verdon, who ran a ship chandlery and commission agents business in Sandridge (now Port Melbourne), Dr. John Wilkins, the surgeon for the Port of Melbourne, and Captain Charles Ferguson, the harbour master at Williamstown.

Initially, the club's races were held mainly on Corio Bay, where many of the club's fleet was moored between 1856 and 1864, and at St Kilda. As the club lacked the funds to purchase its own clubhouse, meetings during the club's early years were held in at least six places around Melbourne and its suburbs.

It appears that between 1865 and 1872, the club became moribund. At a meeting held at the Port Phillip Club Hotel in Flinders Street, Melbourne in 1872, the club was relaunched, and in that year it was also granted the privilege of flying the Blue Ensign of the Colony of Victoria.

The following year, 1873, the club moved its sailing activities to its present site at 120 Nelson Place, Williamstown, on account of the sheltered anchorage at that location. Club members' boats, masts, spars, sails and rigging were stored in a two-storey boathouse at the Williamstown site. Yachts on the club register were typically straight-stemmed, deep-keel cutters of from 6 to 40 tons; most were copper sheathed below the waterline, and painted black with gold embellishments. Club meetings continued to be held mainly at the Port Phillip Club Hotel, and later in the Old Temple Court, Collins Street.

In 1886, the club received from Queen Victoria a grant of the privileges of a royal club, and the Admiralty granted a Full Warrant to fly the Blue Ensign of Her Majesty's Fleet. Since that year, the club has been known as the Royal Yacht Club of Victoria. In 1905, the club established its first clubhouse, by taking out a lease on Wickliffe House, on the Upper Esplanade in St Kilda.

Upon the expiry of the Wickliffe House lease in 1912, the club moved back to the city, at 375 Collins Street. With its clubhouse in central Melbourne, it came to be regarded as more of a social than a sailing club. For that reason, a decision was made to build a clubhouse at the Williamstown site. In 1935, the new clubhouse was completed.

During the Melbourne Olympic Games in 1956, the 5.5 metre sailing class was hosted at the Williamstown site. In 1967, the club began constructing a marina, and demolished the old boathouse to make room for an extended hardstand. Three years later, in 1970, the clubhouse was destroyed by a fire that began in the kitchen, spread rapidly through the wooden building, and also destroyed the majority of the club's treasured relics. Within just over a year, a new brick replacement clubhouse had been constructed.

In 1983, the club took on possibly its most significant commitment ever, when it entered the 12-metre yacht Challenge 12 in the Louis Vuitton Cup, the winner of which was to be the challenger for that year's America's Cup. Although Challenge 12 was eliminated in the early stages of the Louis Vuitton Cup, she was used to prepare the winner of that contest, Australia II, for the America's Cup, and some of her former crew were co-opted as Australia II crew members.

At the beginning of the 21st century, extensions were constructed to the clubhouse and the hardstands. In 2015, the club announced a plan to replace and extend its marina with a new floating structure that would provide berthing for 240 boats. Capital for the project was to be raised through the sale of long-term leases to sailing and motor boat owners. In early 2017, the club decided to proceed with the project in stages, with stage 1 to comprise some forty-two berths.

== See also ==
- Ocean Racing Club of Victoria
