= John Biddle =

John Biddle may refer to:

- John Biddle (Unitarian) (1615–1662), English nontrinitarian and Unitarian
- John Biddle (politician) (1792–1859)
- John Biddle (United States Army officer) (1859–1936)
- John Biddle (yachting cinematographer) (1925–2008)
