= LV Cup =

LV Cup may refer to:

- Louis Vuitton Cup, a yachting event
- Anglo-Welsh Cup, a rugby union event
