= Tom Schnackenberg =

New Zealand sailor and yacht designer

Thomas William Schnackenberg OBE OAM (born 11 May 1945) is a New Zealand sailor and yacht designer best known for his involvement with the America's Cup. He was inducted into the America's Cup Hall of Fame in 2000.

== Early life and education ==
Schnackenberg attended Auckland Grammar School before earning a master's degree in physics from the University of Auckland and enrolling for a Ph.D. at the University of British Columbia.

Having served in the Auckland Grammar School Sea Cadets, Schnackenberg joined the Royal New Zealand Naval Volunteer Reserve (RNZNVR), later acquiring a commission as a Reserve officer at HMNZS Ngapona.

== Career in Sailing ==
Schnackenberg joined North Sails in 1974 and was first involved with the 1977 America's Cup as a sailmaker for US-27 "Enterprise", skippered by Lowell North. He returned to New Zealand in 1978 to establish a branch of North Sails there.

=== America's Cup Involvement ===
1980: Designed sails for Australia

1983: Sail coordinator for Australia II (victorious)

1987: Sail coordinator for Australia III and Australia IV (unsuccessful defense)

1988: Joined New Zealand Challenge, helped design KZ1

1992: Part of Spirit of Australia challenge in the Louis Vuitton Cup

1995: Design coordinator and navigator for Team New Zealand (victorious)

2000: Continued with Team New Zealand (successful defense)

2003: Promoted to syndicate head for Team New Zealand (unsuccessful defense)

2007: Performance data analyst for Luna Rossa Challenge

2010: Part of Alinghi team

2013: Data analyst for Artemis Racing

=== Olympic Involvement ===
Schnackenberg coached the New Zealand yachting team for the Olympic Games in 1992, 1996, and 2000.

== Honours and awards ==
1984: Honorary Medal of the Order of Australia (OAM) for service as sail coordinator in the 1983 America's Cup challenge

1995: Appointed Officer of the Order of the British Empire (OBE) for services to yachting

2001: Honorary Doctor of Engineering from the University of Auckland

2001: Honorary Doctor of Laws from the University of British Columbia
