= Advance Australia =

Advance Australia may refer to:

- Advance Australia, a motto on an early version of the nation's coat of arms
- Advance Australia (lobby group), a political lobbying group
- Advance Australia (yacht), a racing yacht
- "Advance Australia Fair", the national anthem of Australia
- Advance Australia Foundation, an organisation which granted awards in the 1980s and 1990s
- Advance Australia Party (historical), a political party founded in 1988
- Advance Australia Party (2010)
- Advance Australia ... Where?, a book by Hugh Mackay
