= 52 Super Series =

Yacht racing circuit

- First held: 2012
- Type: series of fleet-racing regattas
- Classes: TP 52
- Champions: Quantum American Magic (USA)
- Website: www.52superseries.com

The 52 Super Series is a high-performance, monohull yacht racing circuit.

The "Box Rule" associated to the TP 52 Class, means that boats must, literally, be able to fit within a box of certain dimensions. This means that there are no time allowances or handicaps and the boats race in real-time – first past the post wins. The Box Rule is strict enough to eliminate the need to set handicaps, yet flexible enough to encourage small, yearly innovations. The 52 Super Series is won by teams of skillful sailors, and the setup of the class means that the ages of the boat is of less importance.

The circuit grew from the ashes of the Audi MedCup which finished in 2011 when the principal sponsor withdrew.

The 52 Super Series was developed as an initiative by three key stakeholders, respectively the owners of Quantum Racing, Azzurra and Rán Racing who enjoyed their racing in the TP 52 so much and could see a future in which the owners dictated the direction of the 52 Super Series, embracing all that they had enjoyed about the class and making racing for like minded individuals and crews available in locations and venues enjoyed by all. Overall there is a mix of stand alone TP 52 regattas but mainly the circuit aims to visit existing, popular well run renowned regattas.

== History ==
=== 2012 ===
The 52 Super Series is set up thanks to the initiative of the Argentinian Alberto Roemmers (ARG, Azzurra/Matador), Doug DeVos (USA, Quantum Racing) and Niklas Zennström (SWE, Rán Racing) in collaboration with the TP 52 Class Manager Rob Weiland (NED) and Lars Böcking (GER) of Jacaranda Marketing (SPA-GER) who put the concept together. The ideal is to deliver a mix of venues, owners, and crews enjoy sailing at, embrace even, close, friendly grand prix racing. Four owners initially commit to the full season of five regattas in Spain and Sardinia: Azzurra, Quantum Racing, Rán, and Tony Langley (GBR) of Gladiator The first event in this inaugural year is Barcelona's Conde de Godó Trophy where the 'core four' are joined by ALL4ONE sponsored by Audi. Quantum Racing win the top trophy. Quantum Racing win also in June at the Audi Sardinia Cup 2012, defeating the hosts' Azzurra by three points after seven races. Six boats compete, the 'core four' have added competition from Paprec Recyclage (FRA, Jean Luc Petithuguenin) and Powerplay (BVI/GBR, Tony Cunningham). The circuit travels to Palma for July's Royal Cup back to back with the Copa del Rey. Eight boats race at the Royal Cup which is won by Rán Racing, newcomers are Aquila (AUT) and Ergin Imre's Turkish team on Provezza. Finally at the Audi Valencia Cup in September Audi Azzurra Sailing team win the regatta with Quantum Racing fourth to clinch the first 52 Super Series overall title.

=== 2013 ===
In a bid to encourage the TP 52 owners to travel, for Europeans to race early season in the USA and the American owners and crews to come race in Europe, the US 52 Super Series is set up. This spans two regattas – Key West Race Week and a 52 World Championships – in America in January and March. Azzurra win the US 52 Super Series and are pipped in Miami on the last race by Rán Racing who become 2013 World Champions.

The core of the European circuit is formed by the popular events at known venues. Barcelona is followed by the Royal Cup in Ibiza, Copa del Rey culminating in the Audi Week of the Straits in September at the Yacht Club Costa Smeralda. Quantum Racing win in Barcelona ahead of Gladiator with seven boats racing, including Interlodge and Rio from the USA. Ibiza is a new venue for the 52 Super Series and Quantum Racing make it back to back wins in the eight boat fleet. Gladiator are second again. At the Copa del Rey Quantum Racing extend their unbeaten record to three regattas with Rán Racing second and Azzurra third. Rio take fourth from a spirited battle with Provezza. And at the Week of the Straits a win by Azzurra on their home waters was not enough to stop Quantum Racing from being crowned 2013 52 Super Series champions after winning three from four events. The bubbling interest in the class is reflected in a nine boat entry. Rán Racing are third overall and Gladiator fourth.

=== 2014 ===
Barclays and Zenith join the 52 Super Series as partners. The successful formula for the US 52 Super Series remains and seven boats race at Quantum Key West and at the 52 US Championship. Quantum Racing win both American regattas and the mini-series.

The Barclays 52 Super Series starts in Capri in light winds, where the 52s visit for the first time, travels to Sardinia for the Audi TP 52 World Championship in June, the MAPFRE Copa del Rey in August in Palma culminating in the ZENITH Royal Cup Marina Ibiza in September. Twelve different 52s race in Europe and Quantum Racing win overall. Azzurra open with a win in Capri at Rolex Capri Sailing Week ahead of Vesper (USA), Newly launched Phoenix, the first of the new generation 2015 boats for Brazilian owner Eduardo de Souza Ramos, wins the first race of the season and finishes fifth at their first regatta. Quantum Racing only pip Rán Racing to third place by one single point. From an exciting week in Sardinia Quantum Racing win the TP 52 World Championship title ahead of Phoenix in second with nine boats racing. At the Mediterranean showcase MAPFRE Copa del Rey Quantum Racing reign ahead of Rán Racing which won four races from the ten starts. Finally in Ibiza Quantum Racing do enough to win the regatta ahead of Azzurra while Takashi Okura's Sled – preparing for a full, new boat campaign in 2015 finish fourth.

=== 2015 ===
With nine new boats launched for the start of the season, 2015 proved to be a landmark season in the history of the class and the 52 Super Series.

Five boats were built to Botin Partners' designs – Alegre, Azzurra, Bronenosec, Quantum Racing and Sled and four to Vrolijk designs – Gladiator, Platoon, Provezza, Rán. They joined the new Phoenix, XIO Hurakan which was formerly Quantum Racing and Paprec which was the previous Rán.

Because the new generation of boats were being built through the winter, the 2015 season started not in the USA at Key West but instead was a conventional Europe only circuit comprising five regattas in Spain, Italy and Portugal.

Quantum Racing, the winners of the back to back titles in 2013 and 2014, made changes. They fulfilled a desire to have their enthusiastic and skilled DeVos family members – the team owners – steering their boat as much as possible. So father Doug and son Dalton alternated at different regattas – and actually split the Copa del Rey helming role. The changes early in the season were not easy and added another layer of challenge to the winning equation.

The first regattas were all about getting up to speed and familiar with small details of each new boat as fast as possible.

The season opened in Valencia at the Ford Vignale Sailing Week where Niklas Zennström's Rán Racing won ahead of Andy Soriano's Alegre which made a remarkable debut in the class, taking second place at just two points behind after 11 races. Azzurra hit their stride on their home waters and won the Audi Settimana delle Bocche with a three points cushion. But it was at Puerto Portals and the TP 52 World Championships where they built a real points lead. Azzurra won the world title and their second regatta on the bounce but they were 14pts ahead of second placed Platoon at the end of racing. Quantum Racing found their mojo at the 34th Copa del Rey where Terry Hutchinson sailed as tactician with Dalton DeVos starting as helm and Doug DeVos finishing the deal. Azzurra led until the final day when Quantum Racing won the Copa del Rey with a double bullet final day. At the Cascais Cup in Portugal, Azzurra clinched the season title with a day to spare and Quantum Racing won the regatta. Quantum Racing took second for the season and Takashi Okura's Sled secured third on the final leg of the final race of the season.

=== 2016 ===
The 52 Super Series is in tip-top health. More boats. A visibly higher standard. Better, closer racing. Some well-known faces come home. Great new venues. A fantastic, friendly atmosphere ashore. Tension until the end of the season as competitive rivalries ebb and flow all the way through the fleet. The 2016 52 Super Series season will be remembered for all of these reasons.

This was a long season. Points racing at the five regattas may have started in May in Scarlino and concluded in Cascais in October, but preparations started in Valencia in March when teams got together for some informal training. Gaastra Palma Vela in late April had a full TP 52 entry as crews sought to ensure they were fully primed and ready to hit the straps straight away in Tuscany.

The fleet size grew for 2016. Twelve boats raced in Porto Cervo at the Audi Settimana delle Bocche and at the 52 World Championship in Menorca. After something of a sabbatical in 2015, Niklas Zennström's Rán Racing returned for the full set of regattas. New teams to the circuit this season – Peter Harrison's Sorcha (GBR) and Richard Cohen's Phoenix (USA) – dipped their toes in the water at two events, enjoyed it, and have committed to do more in 2017.

Doug DeVos's Quantum Racing (USA) were convincing overall winners of the 2016 season title. Finishing second to Azzurra (ITA) in 2015 was a spur to raising the bar even higher. They made key crew changes – tough decisions, pre-season. The hard-driving Terry Hutchinson marshalled the team throughout and profited from owner-driver DeVos steering three regattas. They came out of the blocks hard and fast. Winning in Scarlino, they proved furiously consistent. A run that saw them add three more regattas and the 52 World Championship to their belt. Azzurra took second overall, winning the final regatta of the season, while the battle for third went to the wire; Rán Racing securing it on the last race of the last day.

== Format ==
Each regatta consists of ten races, a mixture of windward / leeward and coastal courses. A low points scoring system based on the final standings of each individual race rewards consistency among the fleet.

== Super Series Schedule ==
2025

Date	Regatta	Location
April 29 - May 4 2025	(France) 52 SUPER SERIES Sailing Week	Saint Tropez, France
June 3-8 2025	(Spain) 52 SUPER SERIES Sailing Week	Baiona, Spain
July 1-6 2025	(Portugal) Rolex TP52 World Championship	Cascais, Portugal
August 19-24 2025	(Spain) 52 SUPER Series Sailing Week	Puerto Portals, Mallorca, Spain
September 22-27 2025	(Italy) 52 SUPER SERIES Sailing Week	Porto Cervo, Sardina, Italy

== Previous Winners ==
Year	1st	2nd	3rd
2024	Quantum American Magic	Platoon A.	(United Kingdom) Gladiator
2023	Platoon	(Turkey) Provezza	Quantum American Magic
2022	Quantum Racing	Phoenix	Platoon
2021	Sled	Quantum Racing	Platoon
2020	Azzurra	Phoenix 11	Quantum Racing
2019	Azzurra	Platoon	Quantum Racing
2018	Quantum Racing	Platoon	Azzurra
2017	Azzurra	Platoon	Quantum Racing
2016	Quantum Racing	Azzurra	Rán Racing
2015	Azzurra	Quantum Racing	Sled
2014	Quantum Racing	Azzurra	Rán Racing
2013	Quantum Racing	Azzurra	Rán Racing
2012	Azzurra	Quantum Racing	Rán Racing
