= Cino Ricci =

Italian yachtsman (born 1934)

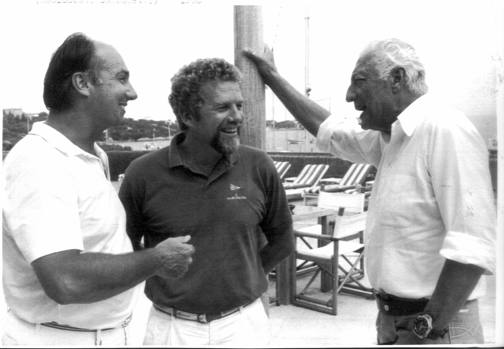
- Cino Ricci (center) with Aga Khan and Gianni Agnelli in 1983.

Personal information
- Nationality: Italian
- Born: 4 September 1934 (age 90); Rimini, Italy

Sport
- Country: Italy
- Sport: Sailing
- Event: Sailing yacht

Cino Ricci (4 September 1934) is an Italian yachtsman and professional sailor. He was skipper of Azzurra at the 1983 Louis Vuitton Cup and 1987 Louis Vuitton Cup.

== Biography ==
Ricci was born in Rimini. At a very young age he started working at sea, first on fishing boats and later as skipper for touristic vessels. In 1965 he started sailing professionally.

== Azzurra ==
In 1982 Ricci was contacted by Gianni Agnelli to run Azzurra, the first serious attempt in Italy to field a boat at the America's Cup. Managed by Luca Cordero di Montezemolo and funded by Aga Khan IV and Agnelli, the yacht was built with the aid of Ambrosini. Azzurra (I-4) proved to be a competitive new challenge. Skippered by Ricci and with Mauro Pelaschier on the helm, the team won 24 of 49 races at the 1983 Louis Vuitton Cup.

In 1988 Ricci retired from competitive sailing to start working as television and journalistic commentator on the main nautical events, He has also organized sailing events, including the Giro d'Italia Sailing, a stage race that takes place annually by circumnavigating the peninsula.

== See also ==
- Italy at the America's Cup
