= America's Cup Hall of Fame =

Annual sailing award

The America's Cup Hall of Fame, located at the Herreshoff Marine Museum of Bristol, Rhode Island, USA, honors individuals for outstanding achievement in the America's Cup sailing competition. Candidates eligible for consideration include skippers, afterguard, crew, designers, builders, organizers, syndicate managers, supporters, chroniclers, race managers, and other individuals of merit. A selection committee of twenty-two members consisting of former America's Cup participants, yachting historians, and yachting journalists annually selects a class of one to four inductees. Rolex, Louis Vuitton, and Prada have been sponsors of the Hall of Fame's induction ceremonies.

The Hall of Fame's museum, a division of the Herreshoff Marine Museum, features plaques of the inductees and permanent and temporary exhibitions of artifacts related to the America's Cup. The museum's library contains one of the largest collections of manuscripts and books related to the America's Cup and yachting history.

== History ==
Halsey C. Herreshoff, former president of the Herreshoff Marine Museum and three-time America's Cup winner, founded the Hall of Fame in 1992. In the following year, on September 18, eighteen "charter" inductees were honored at the Herreshoff Marine Museum. Since then, over ninety inductees have joined the Hall of Fame.

== List of Inductees ==
=== 1993–1999 ===
1993

- (United States) Charles Francis Adams III
- (United Kingdom) Charlie Barr
- (United States) Robert N. Bavier, Jr.
- (Australia) John Bertrand
- (United States) Dennis Conner
- (United States) Briggs S. Cunningham
- (United States) William P. Ficker
- (United States) Nathanael Herreshoff
- (United States) Ted Hood
- (United States) William I. Koch
- (Scotland) Sir Thomas J. Lipton
- (United States) Emil "Bus" Mosbacher
- (United States) George L. Schuyler
- (United States) Olin J. Stephens II
- (United States) Roderick Stephens, Jr.
- (United States) Ted Turner
- (United States) Gertrude Vanderbilt
- (United States) Harold S. Vanderbilt

1994

- (United States) Edward Burgess
- (United States) W. Starling Burgess
- (Australia) Sir James Hardy
- (United States) Sherman Hoyt
- (United States) C. Oliver Iselin
- (United States) Victor A. Romagna
- (United States) John Cox Stevens

1995

- (United States) Arthur Knapp, Jr.
- (United States) Morris Rosenfeld
- (United States) Henry Sears
- (England) T.O.M. Sopwith
- (Scotland) George Lennox Watson

1996

- (New Zealand) Sir Peter Blake
- (New Zealand) Russell Coutts
- (United States) Chandler Hovey
- (England) Frank J. Murdoch
- (United States) Gen. Charles J. Paine

1997

- (England) James Lloyd Ashbury
- (United States) William F. Carstens
- (England) Charles E. Nicholson

1998

- (United States) J. Burr Bartram
- (France) Baron Marcel Bich
- (United States) George Steers

1999

- (United States) Captain Richard Brown
- (United States) James Buttersworth
- (Australia) Sir Frank Packer

=== 2000–2009 ===
2000

- (United States) Edward I. du Moulin
- (United States) Edwin D. Morgan
- (New Zealand) Tom Schnackenberg

2001

- (England) Thomas Egerton, 2nd Earl of Wilton
- (United States) Harry "Buddy" Melges, Jr.
- (United States) Henry Sturgis Morgan

2002

- (United States) Malin Burnham
- (New Zealand) Sir Michael Fay
- (United States) Stanley Rosenfeld

2003

- (Australia) Alan Bond
- (United States) Gary Jobson

2004

- (New Zealand) Brad Butterworth
- (Scotland) William Fife III
- (United States) Henry Coleman Haff
- (United States) Thomas A. Whidden

2005

- (United States) George "Fritz" Jewett Jr.
- (Australia) Alan Payne
- (United States) Jack Sutphen

2006

- (Australia) Ben Lexcen
- (United States) Stephen A. Van Dyck

2007

- (New Zealand) Laurie Davidson
- (France) Bruno Troublé

2008

- (United States) John Biddle

2009

- (Australia) John Longley AM
- (England) Thomas Ratsey

=== 2010–2019 ===
2010

- (United States) Halsey C. Herreshoff
- (New Zealand) Simon Daubney
- (New Zealand) Warwick Fleury
- (New Zealand) Murray Jones
- (New Zealand) Dean Phipps
- (New Zealand) Mike Drummond

2012

- (Italy) Patrizio Bertelli
- (United States) Gerard B. Lambert, Sr.
- (United States) Jonathan Wright

2013

- (Australia) Grant Simmer
- (Australia) Noel Robins
- (United States) Lucy M. Jewett

2016

- (Republic of Ireland) Windham Thomas Wyndham-Quin, 4th Earl of Dunraven and Mount-Earl
- (Switzerland) Ernesto Bertarelli

2017

- (United States) John Marshall
- (United States) Doug Peterson
- (Australia) Syd Fischer

2018

- (Australia) Ken McAlpine

2019

- (France) Henry Racamier
- (United States) William H. Dyer Jones
- (United States) William T. Trenkle

=== 2020–present ===
2020

- (United States) Franklin Osgood
- (England) Bryan Wills
- (Netherlands) Rolf Vrolijk

2021

- (United States) Ed Baird
- (New Zealand) Peter Montgomery (broadcaster)

== See also ==
- America's Cup
- Louis Vuitton Cup
