= Grant Simmer =

Australian sailor and yacht designer (born 1957)

Grant Simmer (born 1957) is an Australian sailor and yacht designer who has competed in multiple America's Cups.

He sailed as navigator on Australia II when it won the 1983 America's Cup. He stayed with Alan Bond's syndicate and was navigator on Australia IV during the 1987 Defender Selection Series. He was awarded the Medal of the Order of Australia in the 1984 Australia Day Honours.

He was a co-owner of North Sails Australia for 17 years until, in 2000, Simmer joined Alinghi as managing director and head of design. He helped design their winning 2003 and 2007 America's Cup boats as well as Alinghi 5 for the 2010 America's Cup defence.

In 2010, he joined Team Origin as CEO. He joined Oracle Racing in 2012 as their general manager, overseeing day-to-day operations at the 2013 and 2017 America's Cups.

He was inducted into the America's Cup Hall of Fame in 2013.

Simmer joined Ben Ainslie Racing in late 2017 to prepare for the 2021 America's Cup.

Grant Simmer is CEO of Britain's America's Cup team. He has competed in 10 America's Cup cycles, winning sport's oldest international trophy four times. His first Cup experience was as a young navigator aboard Australia II's, during their historic victory in 1983, breaking America's 132-year stronghold on the Cup. It was the first time in the competition's history that the trophy had left American shores. The Australian born sailor/designer has gone on to win the America's Cup three further times as head of design, managing director and general manager with Swiss team Alinghi and more recently with ORACLE TEAM USA.

Career highlights: 2013: Winner 34th America's Cup with OTUSA (San Francisco, USA) 2013: Inducted into the America's Cup Hall of Fame 2003 & 2007: Winner America's Cup with Alinghi (Auckland, New Zealand & Valencia, Spain) 1983: Winner America's Cup Australia II (Newport, USA)
