= Dean Phipps =

New Zealand sailor

Dean Phipps is a New Zealand sailor who has competed in eight America's Cups.

Phipps was a part of the Victory ’83 challenge for the 1983 Louis Vuitton Cup and sailed on Australia IV during the 1987 Defender Selection Series. He was the backup bowman for New Zealand Challenge in the 1992 Louis Vuitton Cup.

He sailed on Steinlager 2 during the 1989–90 Whitbread Round the World Race and also competed in the 1993-94 edition, on board Winston.

He sailed with Team New Zealand on NZL 32 during the 1995 America's Cup victory and 2000 America's Cup defence.

Phipps then joined Alinghi, and was part of their 2003 and 2007 America's Cup victories and their 2010 America's Cup loss, although he was not on board the boat. He sailed the 2010 Louis Vuitton Trophy Dubai with Oracle Racing.

He was inducted into the America's Cup Hall of Fame in 2010.

He has also sailed in four Sydney to Hobart Yacht Race, four Fastnet Race, and two Newport Bermuda Races.
