= France 3 (yacht) =

12-metre class yacht

- Yacht club: Yacht Club de France
- Nation: France
- Class: 12-metre
- Sail no: F–3

Racing career
- AC Challenger Selection Series: 1983

France 3 is a 12-metre class yacht that competed in the 1983 Louis Vuitton Cup.
