= USA R-1 =

- Yacht club: St. Francis Yacht Club
- Nation: United States
- Class: 12-metre
- Sail no: US–61

Racing career
- AC Challenger Selection Series: 1987

USA R-1 is a 12-metre class yacht that competed in the 1987 Louis Vuitton Cup.
