= Yacht Club Costa Smeralda =

Yacht club established by the Aga Khan in 1967

Coordinates: 41°08′N 9°32′E

- Burgee
- Founded: 1967
- Location: Porto Cervo, Sardinia
- Commodore: Aga Khan
- Website: www.yccs.it

Yacht Club Costa Smeralda was established by Karim al-Husseini (known by the title Aga Khan IV) in 1967. Located in Porto Cervo in Costa Smeralda, northern Sardinia, it provides services for recreational sailors.

The club challenged for the 1983 America's Cup with Azzurra in Newport, Rhode Island, coming third. In 1984, it hosted the World 12-Metre Class championship, and in 1987 challenged for the America's Cup with Azzurra '87 off Fremantle, Western Australia. The club was chosen by the Royal Perth Yacht Club as the Challenger of Record for the 1987 edition.

== See also ==
- Italy at the America's Cup
- Cino Ricci
