= Royal Perth Yacht Club =

Sailing club in Perth, Western Australia

Coordinates: 31°59′7.39″S 115°49′27.82″E

- Burgee
- Short name: RPYC
- Founded: 1865; 161 years ago
- Location: Australia II Drive, Pelican Point, Crawley, Western Australia, Australia
- Commodore: Janet Hornbuckle
- Website: www.rpyc.com.au

The Royal Perth Yacht Club (RPYC) is a yacht club in Perth, Western Australia. It is the third oldest yacht club in Australia after the Royal Yacht Club of Victoria and the Royal Sydney Yacht Squadron. It is based at the Crawley Marina on Pelican Point and at the Fremantle Annexe in Challenger Harbour.

Royal Perth Yacht Club is a member of the International Council of Yacht Clubs.

Since 2000, Royal Perth Yacht Club has hosted the Sailability WA program to provide opportunities for people with disabilities to engage in sailing activities.

== Early history ==
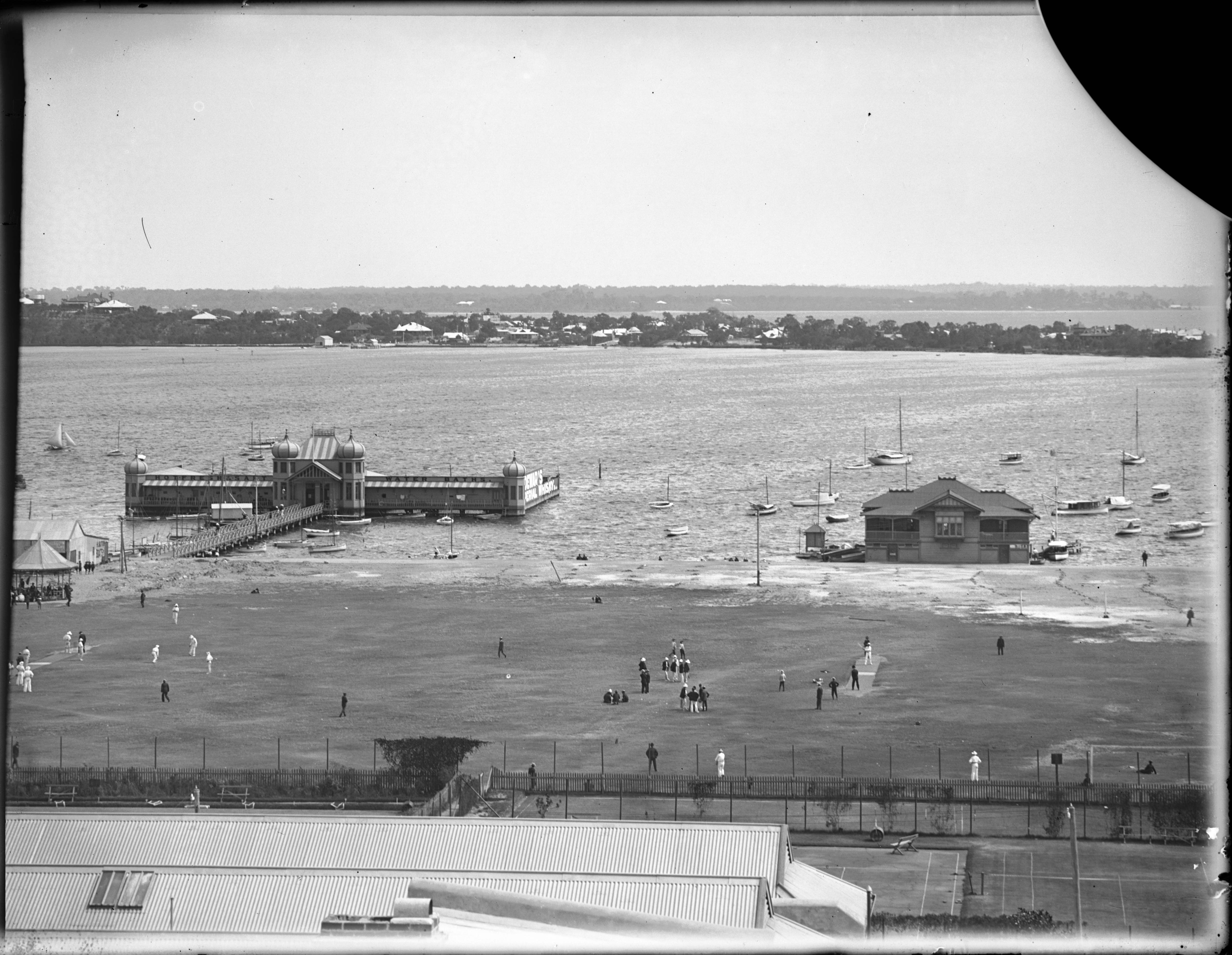
The original Royal Perth Yacht Club location on the right of the Perth City Baths, c. 1905

The Royal Perth Yacht Club can trace its origins to 1841, when a group of sailors staged a modest regatta to celebrate Foundation Day. A subsequent regatta was held in 1843, and then the First Perth Regatta was held on 18 June 1851. In 1865, this original group of pioneer sailors formalised the Perth Yacht Club.

Early regattas at the club included yacht races and gig rowing races. Duck hunting was also popular at this time.

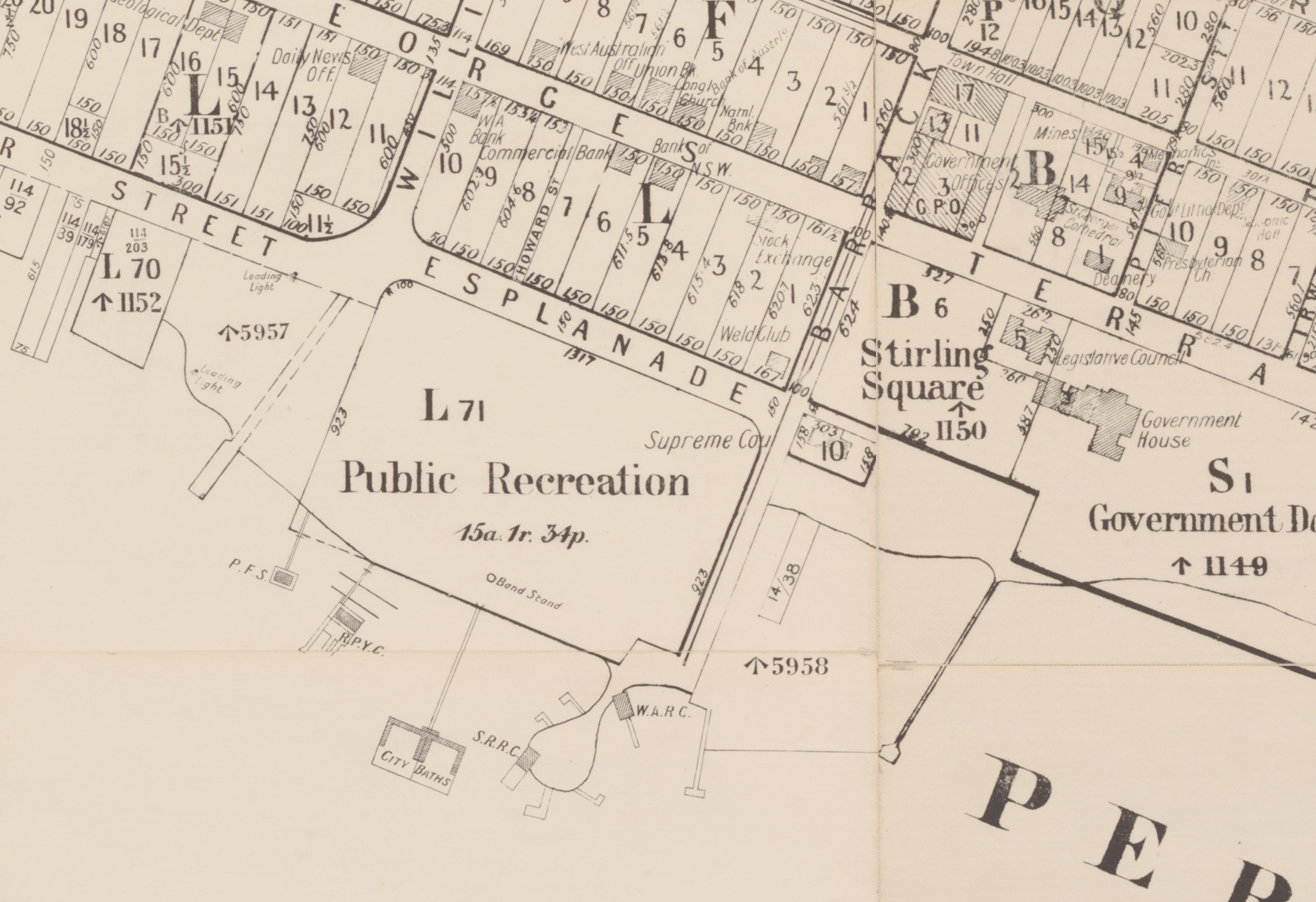
Map showing original location of Royal Perth Yacht Club on Perth Water near William Street

In 1865, W H Knight was elected as founding President of the Perth Yacht and Boat Club and at meeting on 17 March 1870, the first sets of “Sailing Rules” were framed. Royal Perth Yacht Club have an original copy of the Rule Book dated 1880 within the Club Archives. The earliest trophy, dated 1885, is displayed in the club's Wardroom Trophy Cabinet. The first Ladies Committee to be associated with the club was appointed by General Committee in 1885. The first mention of Junior Members in Minutes from 1910 read – “Gentlemen over the age of 16 and under 21, not being the owner of a boat, may be accepted as a Junior Member”. There was no nomination fee and the annual subscription was one guinea, equivalent to A$163.49 in 2022.

In 1880, a jetty was built at the foot of William Street on Perth Water. In 1889, Talbot Hobbs submitted plans for a new clubhouse. The plans were drawn and the tender of two hundred and thirteen pounds was accepted, equivalent to A$33,826.44 in 2022. In the same year, the Governor of Western Australia, Sir Frederic Napier Broome, declared the clubhouse open at a banquet to celebrate the occasion.

In 1890, the club received the Royal Charter from Queen Victoria on the recommendation of Governor Frederick Broome. At a general meeting in 1891, the old blue Perth Yacht Cub burgee was replaced with white burgee, featuring a red triangular St George's Cross with a St Edward's Crown in the upper canton.

In 1903, the Commissioners of the Board of Admiralty granted the Royal Perth Yacht Club a Royal Warrant for the club and members to fly The Plain Blue Ensign of His Majesty's Fleet. The Blue Ensign was first raised at the clubhouse by Frederick Bedford KCB, on July 4, 1903.

In 1920, the clubhouse was extended and the club formed the Royal Australian Naval Volunteer Reserve in Western Australia. The club shifted to Crawley on Melville Water in 1953 when the William Street site, through siltation, became unusable.

== America's Cup ==
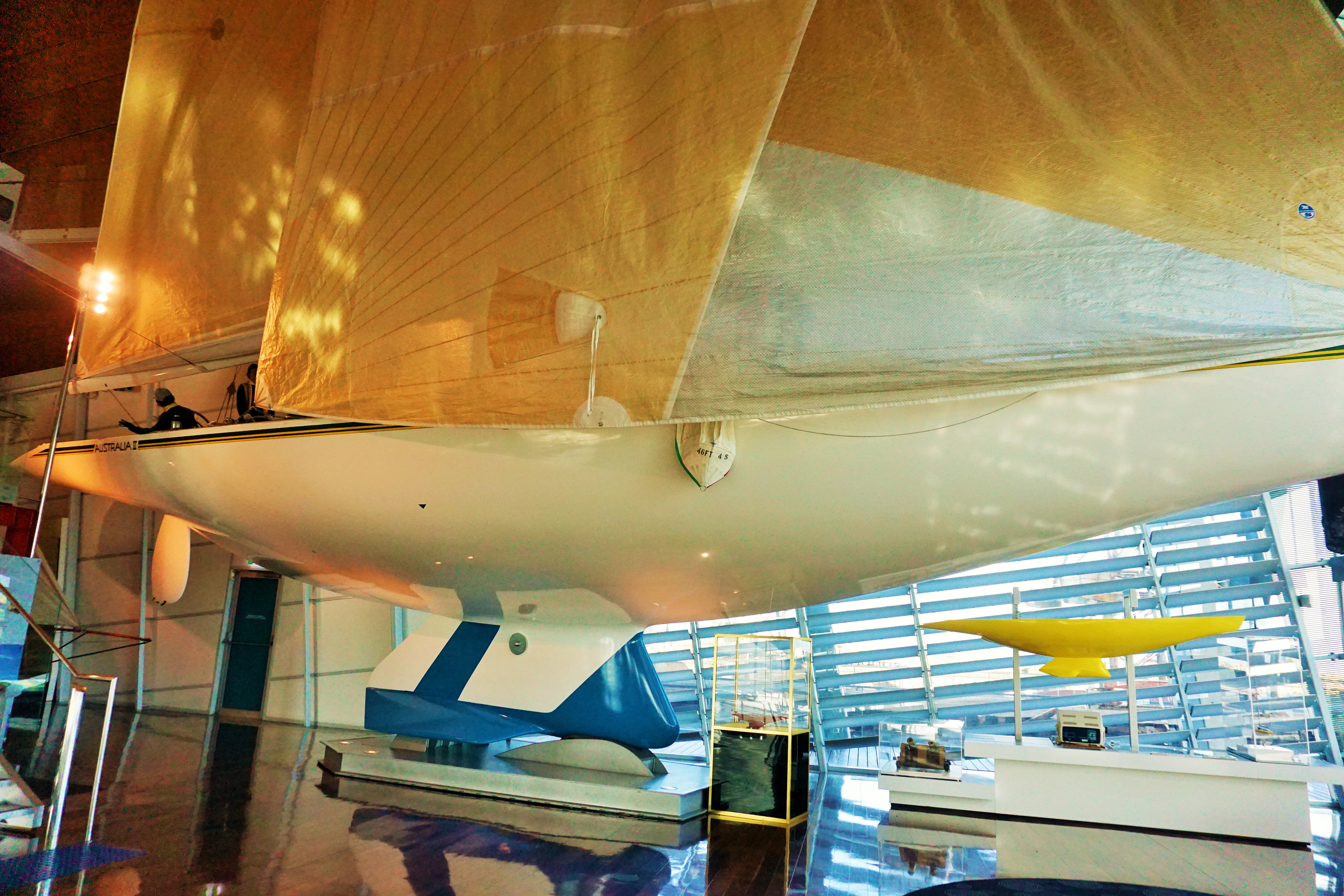
Australia II on display at the WA Maritime Museum in Fremantle.

RPYC fielded the yacht Southern Cross in the 1974 America's Cup, the first aluminium yacht to compete in the regatta, and the yacht Australia in the 1977 America's Cup and the 1980 America's Cup.

In 1983, an Australian syndicate representing the Royal Perth Yacht Club fielded the Australia II, skippered by John Bertrand, against defender Liberty, skippered by Dennis Conner. Australia II won the match races to win the America's Cup - the first winning challenge to the New York Yacht Club, which had successfully defended the cup over a period of 132 years.

Australia II innovative design by Ben Lexcen, included features such as a reduced waterline length and a short chord winged keel.

Prime Minister Bob Hawke was interviewed at the celebrations on the morning of September 27, 1983 at Royal Perth Yacht Club, where he made the famous statement to journalists that "Any boss who sacks anyone for not turning up today is a bum".

RPYC hosted the 1987 defence off Fremantle Harbour at a newly established annex during the Australian summer months between October 1986 and February 1987. The American challenger Stars & Stripes 87, sailed by Dennis Conner, beat the Australian defender Kookaburra III, sailed by Iain Murray, four wins to nil in the best of seven series. This regatta marked the last time that 12-metre class yachts were used in the America's Cup.

The entrance road to RPYC in Crawley was commemoratively renamed Australia II Drive. To mark the 30th anniversary of the America's Cup victory, the second mast of the Australia II was permanently installed by the foreshore outside the clubhouse from which the undefaced Blue ensign and Club burgee are flown.

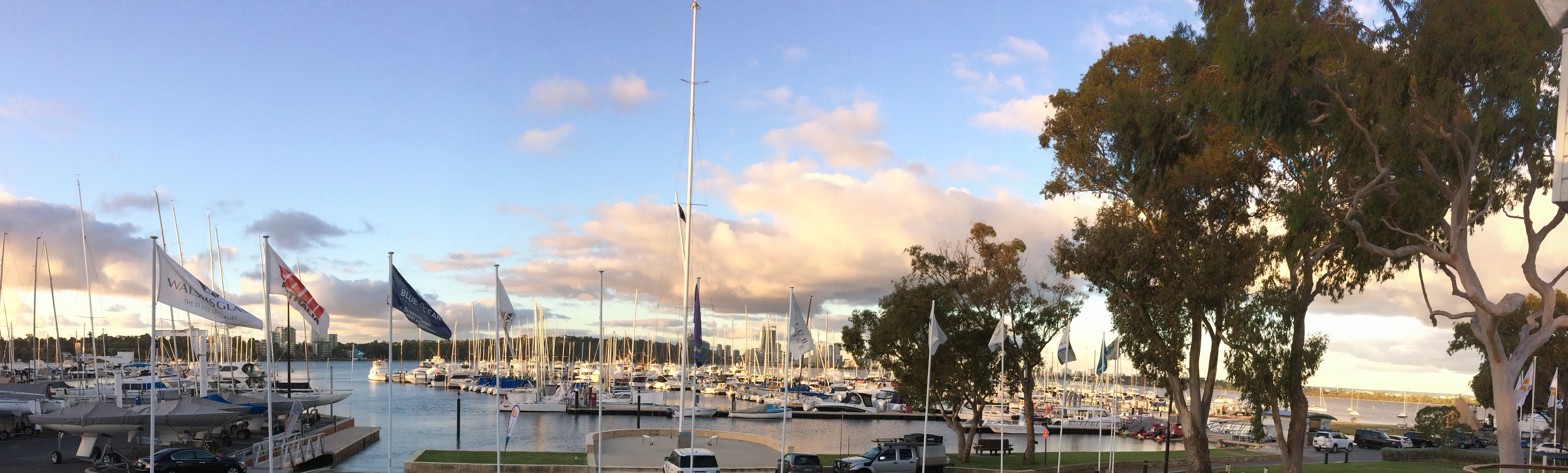
View of the Crawley Marina, Royal Perth Yacht Club

== Notable sailors and events ==
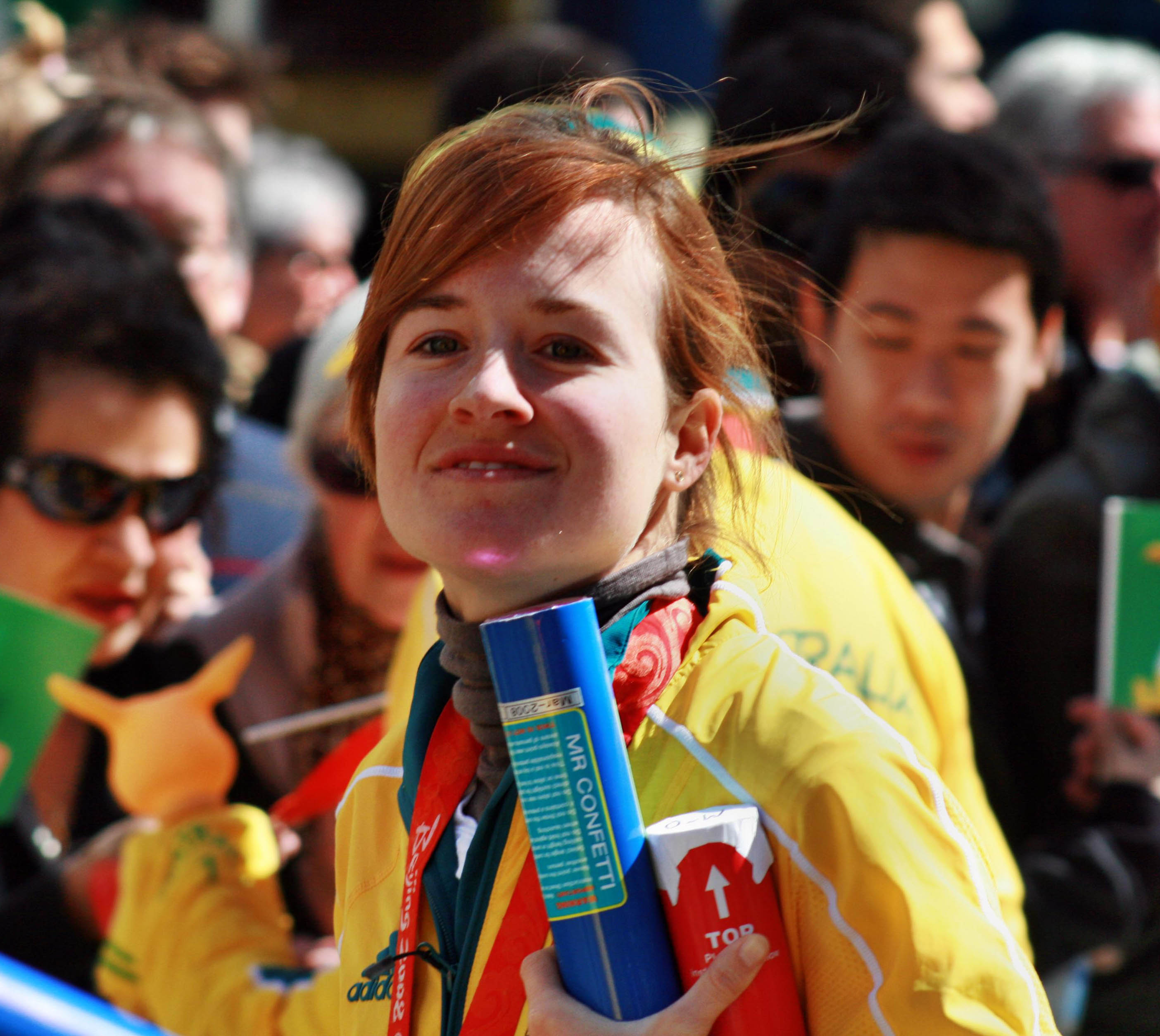
Olympic sailor Elise Rechichi

A number of sailors from RPYC have competed in the Summer Olympics and Paralympics. These include:

- Rolly Tasker, AM - won silver at 1956 Melbourne Olympic Games, Australia's first Olympic medal in Sailing (12 m2 Sharpie Class)
- Noel Robins, OAM - won gold at the 2000 Paralympics (Sonar Class)
- Jamie Dunross, OAM - won gold at the 2000 Paralympics (Sonar Class)
- Graeme Martin, OAM
  - won gold at the 2000 Paralympics (Sonar Class)
  - won bronze at the 2008 Paralympics (Sonar Class)
  - won gold at the 2016 Paralympics (Sonar Class)
- Elise Rechichi, OAM - won gold at the 2008 Olympics (470 Class )
- Tessa Parkinson, OAM - won gold at the 2008 Olympics (470 Class)
- Rachael Cox - won silver at the 2008 Paralympics (Skud 18 Class)
- Colin Harrison, OAM
  - won bronze at the 2008 Paralympics (Sonar Class)
  - won gold at the 2016 Paralympics (Sonar Class)
- Russell Boaden, OAM (Sonar Class
  - won bronze at the 2008 Paralympics (Sonar Class)
  - won gold at the 2016 Paralympics (Sonar Class)
- Matt Wearn, OAM - won gold at the 2020 Olympics (Laser Class)

In 1979, the RPYC organised the 20,000-kilometre (12,000 mi) Parmelia Yacht Race from Plymouth, England to Perth in order to mark the 150th anniversary of Western Australia. Competitors were invited to recreate the 1829 voyage of the merchant barque Parmelia bringing the first British settlers to the Swan River Colony.

Jon Sanders was the first sailor to circumnavigate Antarctica solo, circling the continent twice from 1981 to 1982. Sanders is the record-holder for the longest distance ever sailed continuously by any vessel following his triple non-stop solo circumnavigation of the globe from 1986 to 1988.

RPYC hosted the 2011 ISAF Sailing World Championships, a significant qualifying event for the 2012 Summer Olympics.

== See also ==
- List of International Council of Yacht Clubs members
- America's Cup title holders
  - New York Yacht Club, defeating the competition's founders, the Royal Yacht Squadron, 1851-1983
  - San Diego Yacht Club, 1987-1995
  - Société Nautique de Genève, 2003-2010
  - Golden Gate Yacht Club, 2010-2017
  - Royal New Zealand Yacht Squadron; 1995-2003, 2017-present
