= Advertiser-Gleam =

Newspaper in Guntersville, Alabama, US

- Type: Weekly newspaper
- Format: Broadsheet
- Founder: Porter Harvey
- Editor: Anthony Campbell
- Founded: 1941
- Language: English
- Headquarters: Centreville, Alabama
- Circulation: 10,251
- OCLC number: 11832342
- Website: advertisergleam.com

The Advertiser–Gleam is a newspaper serving Guntersville, Alabama, in the United States. It was founded by Porter Harvey in 1941 after he left the Birmingham Post. Harvey had worked for a number of other papers, including the New York Post and the Nashville Tennessean. Initially named the Guntersville Gleam, the paper was named for the gleam sunlight made on the town's Guntersville lake.

The paper disregarded most traditions of the time regarding small-town papers. It ran few editorials, almost exclusively ran local news, did not departmentalize its stories, and adopted a casual, occasionally humorous style.

Throughout the 1980s and 1990s the paper was best known for its unique approach to obituaries, which combined personal details of the deceased's life with often anecdotes and style more common in the obituaries of famous people. The practice occasioned a study of the obituaries in a full chapter of Kitch and Hume's Journalism in a Culture of Grief, where the authors analyzed 738 obituaries printed by the paper to better understand the role obituaries can play in local news.

The local focus and unique style worked: at the time of Porter Harvey's death in 1995 the paper had the largest circulation of any non-daily in the state.

After Porter's death his son Sam—who had worked alongside his father at the paper for many years as an editor—carried forward the traditions of the paper. For his work on the paper, the younger Harvey won a lifetime achievement award from the Alabama Press Association in 2008.

In 2014 the paper was sold to the Sheltons, a long-time newspaper family headquartered in Decatur, Alabama. The terms of the sale were not disclosed. According to the American Newspaper Representatives, the newspaper has a paid circulation of approximately 10, 251 copies.
