= John Biddle (yachting cinematographer) =

American yachting cinematographer

- Biddle on location, 1974
- Born: June 7, 1925; Philadelphia, Pennsylvania, U.S.
- Died: October 1, 2008 (aged 83); Middletown, Rhode Island, U.S.
- Occupation: yachting cinematographer/lecturer
- Years active: 1956–2002

John Scott Biddle (June 7, 1925 – October 1, 2008) was a foremost yachting cinematographer and lecturer, establishing a film-making career that spanned more than forty years. His films captured not only the technical aspects of sailing but also the human story in events as tranquil as a Nova Scotia cruise and as grand as the America's Cup Races.

== Early life ==
Biddle was born on June 7, 1925, near Philadelphia, the fourth of five children. His parents, were both from prominent Philadelphia families. His father was Brigadier General Nicholas Biddle (1893–1977), whose great-grandfather was Nicholas Biddle, President of the Second Bank of the United States. His mother was Sarah Lippincott Biddle (1894–1962), whose paternal grandfather Joshua Ballinger Lippincott (1813–1886) founded J. B. Lippincott Company, and maternal grandfather Joseph Wharton (1826–1909) founded the Wharton School of the University of Pennsylvania. His colorful family included cousins Livingston L. Biddle, Jr. and Anthony Joseph Drexel Biddle, Jr.

Biddle's father served a lifelong term with the National Guard, was active in both World Wars, and was a well-noted, big-game hunter. He was commissioned to travel the world and bring back specimens; some of his ‘trophies’ still reside at Philadelphia's Academy of Natural Sciences. During Nicholas’ travels, he would film the hunts, then return home and allow young John to experiment with his movie camera and all his unexposed film.

John tinkered further with the camera at his family's summer home in Jamestown, Rhode Island, where he also mastered the idiosyncrasies of ocean sailing. Focusing on his brothers, sisters and twelve cousins as subjects on and around Narragansett Bay, he refined his choice of angles, composition, containment of action within the frame and editing.

== School and military years ==
Biddle, and his many cousins, attended Meadowbrook School, then went on to Kent School in Connecticut. He turned 18 in 1943 and served in the infantry during World War II. A bad tooth sent him to the back of the lines during fighting in Belgium. There it was noticed that he could play piano and work a movie projector, so he was assigned to entertain the troops. Shortly thereafter, he discovered two thirds of his platoon had been killed in a firefight. His entertaining skills likely had spared his life. They also led to an unlikely occurrence: brother Nicholas Jr., who was fighting in the same region, learned that John was working at the back of the lines and flabbergasted him with a visit. After the war, John attended Trinity College, then returned overseas to Germany with the First Troop Philadelphia City Cavalry during the Korean War.

== Yachting cinematographer ==
In the 1950s, Biddle spent several years working as an engineer while snapping wedding and baby photos on the side. His father would have liked him to enter the family insurance business, Biddle, Bishop and Smith (now named Biddle & Company), but John saw a different path. After watching a John Jay skiing film, he imagined himself doing the same but with sailing. The following June he embarked on the 1956 Bermuda Race aboard his cousin, Charles Wharton's, 51-foot cutter, Souvenir, bringing along his film camera to capture the event. He combined that footage with three other pieces he shot that summer and would later booked himself into yacht clubs for his first lecture-show.

For over four decades, Biddle shot films of dinghy races, Tall Ships events and everything in between. Over seventy types of boats were shown in his documentary-style presentations. 16 mm Bell and Howell in hand, he filmed 130 feet off the deck of square-riggers and fifteen feet underwater. He filmed from Greenland down to the Islands, from Greece to New Zealand. He shot ocean races like the Fastnet Race, sailing regattas such as the Friendship Sloop Regatta, cruises, celebrations, native fishboat races, small boat races. To capture viewable images on the rolling, bouncy seas, he used (and later marketed) what he called the Biddlestick – a monopod-like stick which he attached to his movie cameras, allowing him to hold onto deck stays while keeping the camera steady.

In addition to his annual show, Biddle made promotional films for boat manufacturers and sailboat classes, filmed a five-episode TV series for Mercury Marine called "Let’s Go Boating" narrated by Lloyd Bridges, and occasionally filmed for private clients.

Introducing one of his shows, "And away we go to..."

== Lecturer ==
Each year, Biddle filmed three to four events during the summer months and edited the footage into a 90-minute presentation in the fall. He also wrote the accompanying script, selected music, and edited it to align with the film. During the winter, he embarked on a five-month tour across the United States, Canada, Bermuda, the Caribbean (and occasionally Europe and Australia) where he delivered up to 100 in-person presentations, primarily at yacht clubs. For many audience members, these presentations provided a rare opportunity to view highlights from the previous year’s sailing events. A key feature of his work was his ability to capture both the dynamic and lighthearted elements of sailing, conveyed not only through film but also through his concise, understated narration, which often included humorous expressions such as “callapso flapitis” to describe moments of confusion on board. Biddle was his own production company, performing the tasks of: contact agent, scheduler, publicist, copywriter, photo developer, poster designer, accountant, cinematographer, film editor, scriptwriter, music editor, driver, porter, set-up man and performer.

== Family life ==
Biddle married Mary McMichael in 1961 in Jamestown, Rhode Island and they had two children, Sophie in 1964 and Scott in 1966. Mary assisted John in filming the early America's Cup races. She had a stroke shortly after the birth of Scott and died five years later. Following this, Biddle managed to spend time at home with his children while continuing his career on the road and was able to include Sophie and Scott on trips to Bermuda, a cruise to Maine and trips to various lecture dates. In March 1977, he married Amy McKay van Roden in Bryn Mawr, Pennsylvania with three stepchildren: Winifred, Peter and Julie.

== Career highlights ==
Biddle filmed two races multiple times. The Bermuda Race he sailed 11 times to capture the stories that this pre-eminent, East Coast distance race delivered. Despite the race's long history and prestige, Biddle is the only film-maker to have focused on it. He also filmed the international yacht racing event, the America's Cup, all ten times when 12-metre class boats were used, from 1958 to 1987. For this, he took footage of the Sparkman & Stephens test tanks, of the spring practices, the summer trials, the Newport, Rhode Island balls, the dock happenings and the September finals. He was invited to shoot on board the 12-metre yachts by mercurial skippers including Ted Turner, Dennis Conner, Ted Hood and Bus Mosbacher. The rare invitations were granted because of his nautical proficiency and ability to get key shots while staying clear of onboard action.

== Final years ==
After moving to Jamestown in 1980, Biddle became active with the Jamestown Community Chorus and directed the town talent show for several years.

During his career, Biddle created 140 sailing films which he placed into 41 annual lecture shows from 1956 to 1996. He made over 3,000 presentations to audiences as large as 3,000 people. In the summer of 2008, Biddle was nominated for induction into the America's Cup Hall of Fame at the Herreshoff Marine Museum in Bristol, Rhode Island. He fell ill with cancer soon thereafter and died on October 1, 2008, at the age of 83 in Middletown, Rhode Island. The formal induction ceremony was held in April 2009. Gary Jobson said of Biddle's film-making achievement, “His film archive is one of the most comprehensive and important yachting libraries in existence”. Biddle was also inducted into the National Sailing Hall of Fame in 2018.
