= Challenge 12 =

- Yacht club: Royal Yacht Club of Victoria
- Nation: Australia
- Class: 12-metre
- Sail no: KA–10

Racing career
- AC Challenger Selection Series: 1983

Challenge 12 is a 12-metre class yacht that competed in the 1983 Louis Vuitton Cup.
