= Victory '83 =

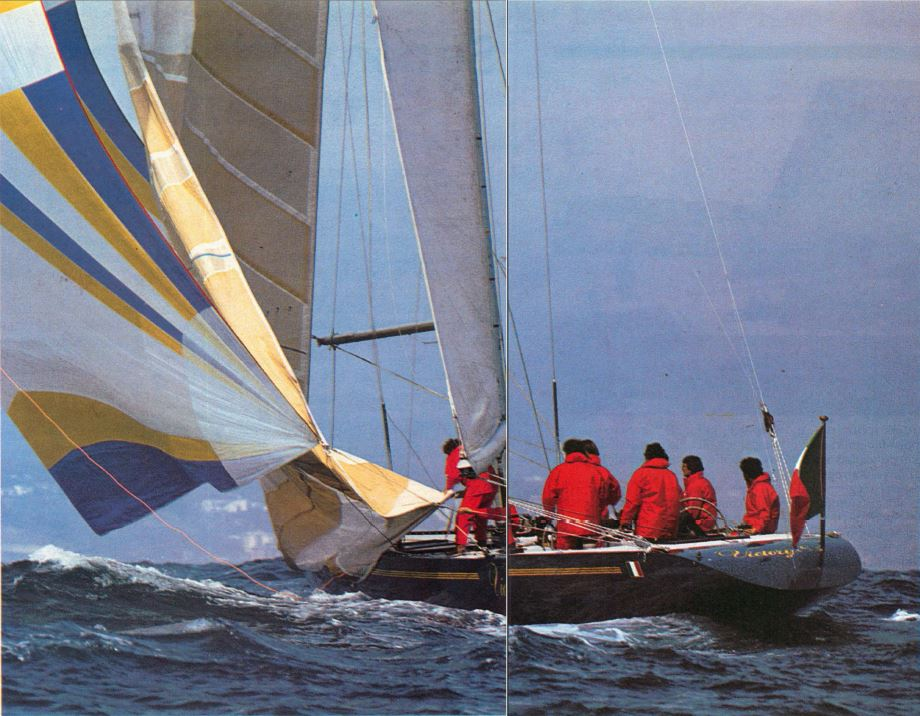
- Victory '83 when owned by Consorzio Italia, 1985
- Yacht club: Royal Burnham Yacht Club
- Nation: United Kingdom
- Class: 12-metre
- Sail no: K–22

Racing career
- AC Challenger Selection Series: 1983

Victory '83 is a 12-metre class yacht that competed in the 1983 Louis Vuitton Cup.
