= Azzurra III =

- Yacht club: Yacht Club Costa Smeralda
- Nation: Italy
- Class: 12-metre
- Sail no: I–8

Racing career
- AC Challenger Selection Series: 1987

Azzurra III is a 12-metre class yacht that competed in the 1987 Louis Vuitton Cup.
