= Azzurra (yacht) =

- Yacht club: Yacht Club Costa Smeralda
- Nation: Italy
- Class: 12-metre
- Sail no: I–4

Racing career
- AC Challenger Selection Series: 1983

Azzurra is a 12-metre class yacht that competed in the 1983 Louis Vuitton Cup.

== See also ==
- Italy at the America's Cup
