= Liberty (yacht) =

Yacht that defended the America's Cup in 1983

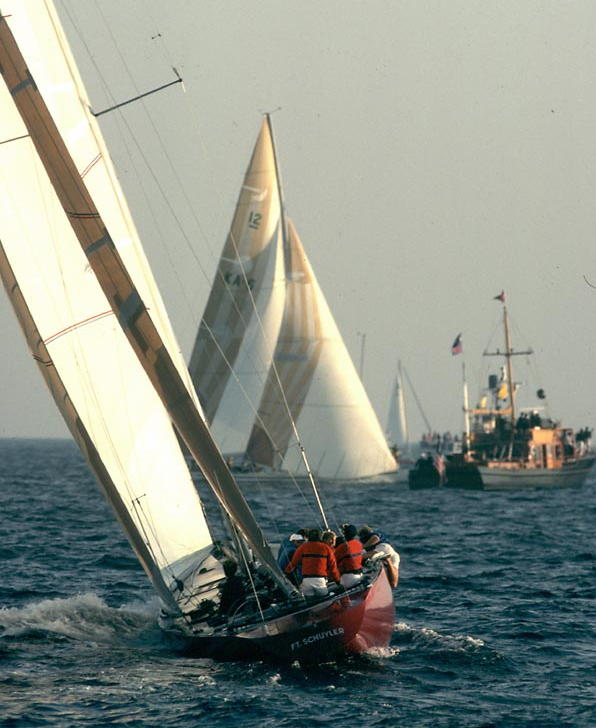
- Liberty in 1983.
- Yacht club: New York Yacht Club
- Nation: United States
- Class: 12-metre
- Sail no: US–40
- Designer(s): Johan Valentijn
- Builder: Newport Offshore, Ltd.
- Launched: 1983
- Owner(s): Freedom syndicate

Racing career
- Skippers: Dennis Conner
- Notable victories: 1983 America's Cup Defender Selections Series
- America's Cup: 1983 America's Cup
- AC Defender Selection Series: 1983 America's Cup Defender Selections Series

Liberty (US-40) was an American racing yacht in the 12-metre class that unsuccessfully defended the 1983 America's Cup.

After a competition with Defender and Courageous, Liberty was selected as the defender. She lost to Australia II by 3–4 in the America's Cup.

== Background ==
Following the 1980 America's Cup where Freedom defeated Australia, the Freedom ’83 Defence Syndicate, whose fundraising was run through the Maritime College at the Fort Schuyler Foundation, decided to commission two new 12 metre yachts for the 1983 defence. Dennis Conner asked the designers to take risks so that the new boat would not simply be a refined version of Freedom, but rather a new design that broke through her.

The first boat, Spirit of America (US-34), was designed by Bill Langan from Sparkman & Stephens. Langan described it as a "large, light twelve."

The second boat, Magic (US-38), was designed by Johan Valentijn. Valentijn sought to build a small, light displacement 12 metre and Magic was several feet shorter than Spirit of America and displaced a mere 45,000 pounds (20.4 metric tonnes) – about three-quarters of most contemporary 12 metres. Both Spirit of America and Magic were commissioned at Fort Schuyler, New York, on 17 April 1982.

Both boats, however, were failures. Despite the best efforts of the designers with input from computers, wind tunnels, and test tanks, Freedom dominated its new stablemates: Magic was uncompetitive in strong wind and Spirit of America would have needed major modifications to become competitive. On 8 September 1982, Dennis Conner announced that Magic would be sold and that the proceeds would be used to design a third boat for the Freedom ’83 syndicate.

== Design and construction ==
The initial proposal for the third boat was that Sparkman & Stephens and Johan Valentijn would collaborate to design a refined version of Freedom. This idea was eventually abandoned and ultimately Valentijn was asked to design the third boat himself with the input of Halsey Herreshoff, Conner’s navigator and a designer in his own right.

Liberty was built by Newport Offshore and was delivered to the Freedom ’83 Syndicate in January 1983. Early results were mixed, but she was a clear improvement over Spirit of America and the Sparkman and Stephens’ boat was retired.

By early spring 1983, it was clear some modifications were needed to improve Liberty’s performance. In particular, its seaway motion needed to be steadied and, in the process, make its performance in heavy winds comparable to Freedom’s. Three feet were cut from the boat’s stern and both the keel and rig were moved forward. The alterations worked. Just before the defender races began, Conner announced that Liberty would be the boat he would be sailing on behalf of the Freedom ’83 syndicate.

== Performance ==
Despite being the first US boat to lose the America’s Cup, Liberty was not a badly designed or poorly performing yacht. It clearly had the performance to be selected as the US defender, having comprehensively beaten Courageous (US-26). In doing so, Liberty demonstrated a versatile performance in winds ranging from seven to 17 knots.

Against Australia II, a genuine ‘break-through’ design, Liberty won three races and arguably should have won the series but for two events. First, just prior to the crucial fifth race, when Liberty was leading Australia II by 3–1 and needed only one more race to win the cup, the US boat broke its jumper struts close to the top of the mast. Although repairs were made, they weren't completely effective and on the first leg of the race, the port jumper strut again collapsed, disadvantaging the boat. Australia II went on to win the fifth race by 1:47 secs. Secondly, Liberty was 57 seconds ahead at the start of the fifth leg on the final race; Conner's tactical mistake of not covering Australia II on the final downwind run allowed Australia II to overtake the US boat and eventually win the race and the America's Cup.

Two additional points that should be made are that of Liberty’s rating certificates, and the psychology between the Australia II and Liberty crews – in particular that of Dennis Conner.

First, Liberty had three rating certificates: one each for light, medium, and heavy wind. That is, the Liberty camp could change the ballast and sail area depending on the conditions. Prior to the seventh race, the Liberty crew did just that, lifting ballast from the boat and increasing its sail area. John Bertrand, helmsman of Australia II, admitted that in that final race: “the ballasting challenges they had made to Liberty – adding more sail area and taking weight out of the boat – sped her up remarkably… she had a little bit more speed on us and all of a sudden, we were in trouble.”

Second, Conner did appear to be laboring under the psychological weight of Australia II 's excellent performance and the mystery of the winged keel. It seems that he was convinced Liberty was the slower boat and this almost certainly influenced his tactical decisions – perhaps even the decision not to cover Australia II on the fifth leg of the final race. During an interview following Liberty’s comprehensive 3:25 secs loss in the sixth race, he said: "yes we’ve made mistakes, I think that relative to the potential of our yacht we’ve gotten a fair bit out of it this series and we’re pleased.” (Author's emphasis)

== Fate ==
Liberty’s ultimate fate is unknown. During 1986–1988, the boat was the property of Sail America Foundation. Its home port was San Diego, California and it served as a trial-horse to Stars & Stripes '87. During 1988–1989 it was transferred to the America's Cup Organizing Committee, also in San Diego.

The evidence then indicates it was sold to a Japanese owner in 1989. Unsubstantiated reports indicate that it sank off the coast of Kobe, Japan, in that year or 1991.
