= Advance Australia (yacht) =

Sailing yacht

- Yacht club: Royal Sydney Yacht Squadron
- Nation: Australia
- Class: 12-metre
- Sail no: KA–7

Racing career
- AC Challenger Selection Series: 1983

Advance Australia is a 12-metre class yacht that competed in the 1983 Louis Vuitton Cup.
