= Royal Burnham Yacht Club =

The Royal Burnham Yacht Club (or RBYC) was founded in 1895. The club is located in Burnham-on-Crouch, England. The RBYC is divided into two groups of members: the cadets nineteen and younger, and the full members who are over nineteen. The club has a colourful history, including the launching of the 1983 Americas Cup Challenge: Victory Challenge. The Club has established relations with the Yacht Club De Monaco. With a team racing event that was held in Monaco for 8 cadets in April 2006. The RBYC also has the largest fleet of RS Elite (3 man day-racing keelboats) in the country.

== See also ==
- Crouch Yacht Club
- Royal Corinthian Yacht Club
