= Mauro Pelaschier =

Italian sailor

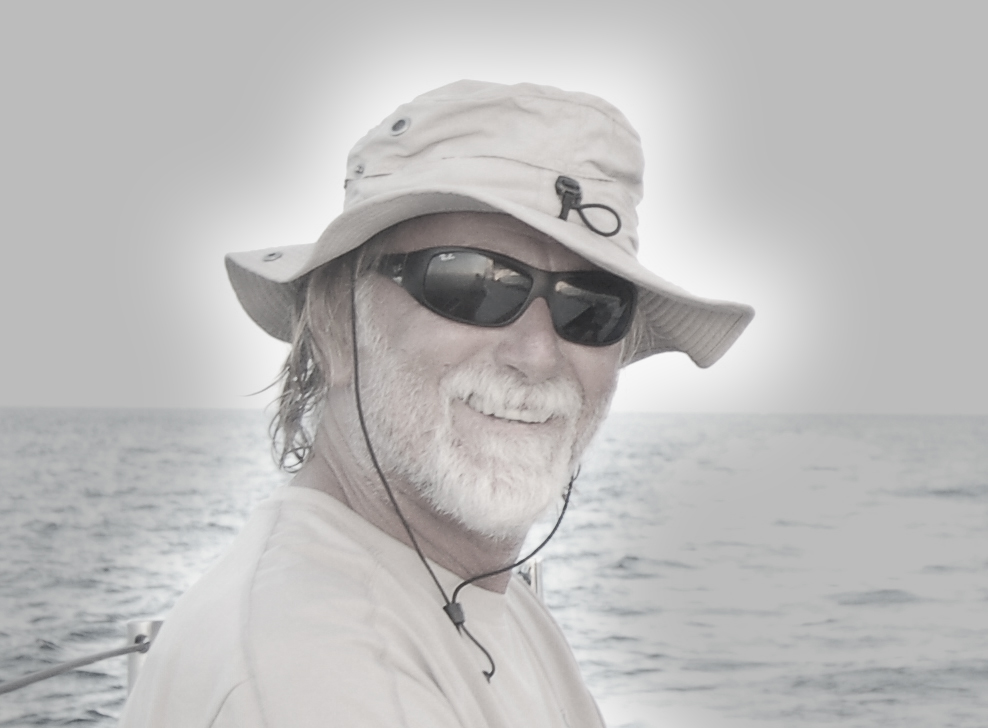
- during the "Palermo-Montecarlo 2009"

Personal information
- Nationality: Italian
- Born: 29 April 1949 (age 75); Monfalcone, Italy

Sport
- Sport: Sailing

Mauro Pelaschier (born 29 April 1949) is an Italian sailor. He competed at the 1972 Summer Olympics and the 1976 Summer Olympics.
