= John Bertrand (sailor, born 1946) =

Australian sailor

John Bertrand AO OLY
Personal information
- Full name: John Edwin Bertrand
- Born: 20 December 1946 (age 79) Melbourne, Victoria, Australia
Medal record
Sailing
Representing Australia
Olympic Games
Bronze medal – third place	1976 Montreal	Finn class

John Edwin Bertrand AO OLY (born 20 December 1946) is an Australian sailor who skippered Australia II to victory in the 1983 America's Cup, ending 132 years of American supremacy, and the only time Australia has won. Bertrand won the bronze medal in the Finn competition at the 1976 Summer Olympics in Montreal. In 2010 and 2016, he won the world Etchells class sailing championships. He is a life member of both the Royal Brighton Yacht Club in Melbourne, and the Sorrento Sailing Couta Boat Club.

== Biography ==
John Bertrand was born in Melbourne, Victoria.

He wrote Born to Win, The Power of a Vision, about the 1983 America's Cup victory, including insightful observations on the strategy for an unfavoured team against very long odds. During the 1983 competition, Bertrand and his crew deliberately employed their own psychological strategy ahead of the America's Cup breakthrough in refusing to refer to the all-conquering American team by their names and instead calling their opposition simply "the red boat" in order to mislead the rival. In the 2016 Rio Olympics, Mack Horton, an Australian freestyle swimming champion, admitted the criticism towards another swimmer, Sun Yang was a deliberate strategy to try and gain a mental edge on his rival, borrowing from the tactics employed by Bertrand in the lead-up to Australia II's famous triumph in 1983.

Bertrand is the chairman of the Sport Australia Hall of Fame (2005–present). He served as the chair of The Alannah and Madeline Foundation from 2002 to 2017, and as the president of Swimming Australia from 2013 to 2020.

== Honours ==
- 26 January 1984: Member of the Order of Australia (AM) in recognition of service to yachting, particularly as skipper of the Australia II in the America's Cup challenge 1983.
- 10 December 1985: Induction into the Sport Australia Hall of Fame
- 18 September 1993: Member of the America's Cup Hall of Fame for outstanding achievement in the America's Cup.
- 14 July 2000: Australian Sports Medal for outstanding achievement in the America's Cup and general contribution
- 1 January 2001: Centenary Medal for service to Australian society through the sport of Sailing.
- 2008 Melburnian of the Year for community leadership.
- 25 October 2013: Awarded an Honorary Doctorate, Victoria University.
- 10 October 2014: Elevated to Legend of The Sport Australia Hall of Fame.
- 2014: Bertrand was made a Monash University Vice Chancellor Professorial Fellow.
- 2016: Upgraded to Officer of the Order of Australia (AO), the 2016 Queen's Birthday Honours list. In recognition for sporting administration, in particular swimming and sailing, children's welfare, higher education and mentoring of young people.

== Personal ==
- Bertrand has a Bachelor of Engineering (Monash University 1970) and a Master of Science (Massachusetts Institute of Technology 1972).
- He has been married, since 1969, to Rasa Bertrand, whom he met as a student, while Rasa was nursing and already 9 years older, established as a working income for John to continue his career.
