= Australia II =

Australian racing yacht

Coordinates: 32.05478°S 115.73874°E

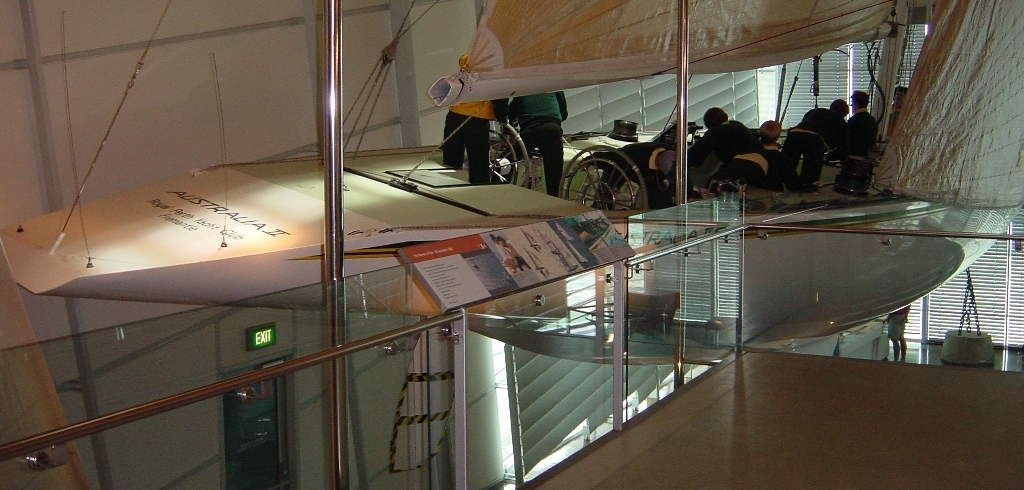
- Yacht club: Royal Perth Yacht Club
- Nation: Australia
- Class: 12-metre
- Sail no: KA–6
- Designer(s): Ben Lexcen
- Builder: Steve Ward
- Launched: 1982
- Owner(s): Alan Bond; Australian Government c.1985

Racing career
- Skippers: John Bertrand
- Notable victories: 1983 Louis Vuitton Cup; 1983 America's Cup
- America's Cup: 1983

Specifications
- Displacement: 21.8 tons
- Length: 19.21 m (63.0 ft) (LOA); 13.10 m (43.0 ft) (LWL)
- Beam: 3.64 m (11.9 ft)
- Draft: 2.72 m (8 ft 11 in)
- Sail area: 175 m^{2} (1,880 sq ft)

Australia II (KA 6) is an Australian 12-metre-class America's Cup challenge racing yacht that was launched in 1982 and won the 1983 America's Cup for the Royal Perth Yacht Club. Skippered by John Bertrand, she was the first successful Cup challenger, ending a 132-year tenure (with 26 successful defences) by the New York Yacht Club.

== Design ==
Australia II was designed by Ben Lexcen, built by Steve Ward, owned by Alan Bond and skippered by John Bertrand. Lexcen's Australia II design featured a reduced waterline length and a short chord winged keel which gave the boat a significant advantage in manoeuvrability and heeling moment (lower ballast centre of gravity) but it was a significant disadvantage in choppy seas. The boat was also very quick in stays. The winged keel was a major design advance, and its legality was questioned by the New York Yacht Club. During the summer of 1983, as selection trials took place for the Cup defence that autumn, the New York Yacht Club challenged the legality of the keel design. The controversy was decided in Australia II's favour.

Australia II sported a number of other innovative features that contributed to her success, including radical vertical sail designs, all-kevlar running rigging and a lightweight carbon fibre boom.

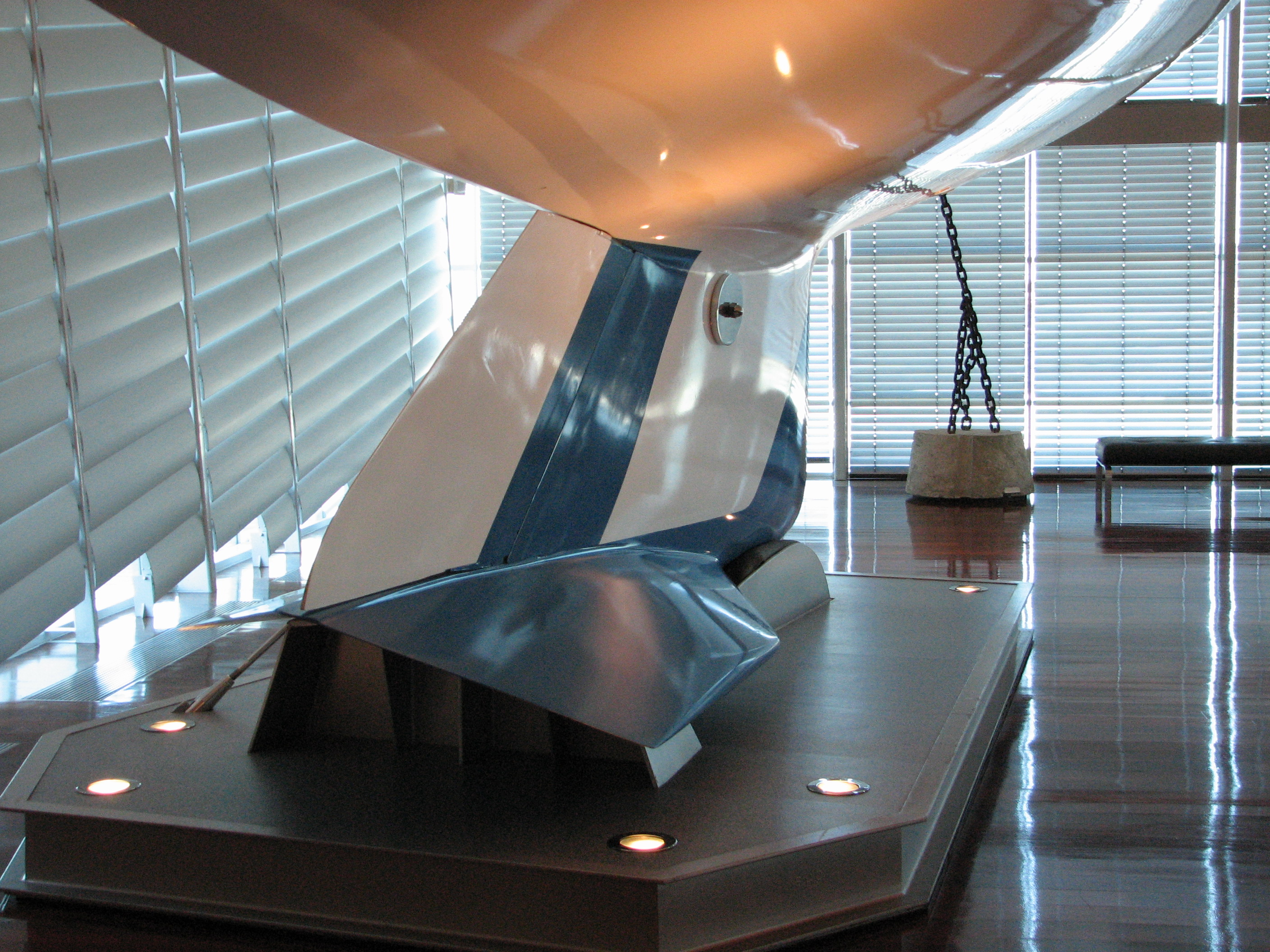
Winged keel of Australia II

=== Later claims of Dutch design ===
In 2009, more than two decades after Ben Lexcen's death, Dutch naval architect Peter van Oossanen claimed that the winged keel was actually designed by him and his group of Dutch designers, and not Lexcen. If true, this would have been reason to disqualify Australia II, since the rules then stated that challenging yachts were to be designed only by citizens of the nations they represented.

The controversy arose due to Cup rules allowing designers to use model basins for testing that were not located in the challenging country. Model testing was performed in the Netherlands and Peter van Oossanen and another Dutch engineer, Joop Sloof, performed measurements and analyses related to evaluation of winged keel designs.

The suggestion that the vessel was not designed by Australians has been refuted by both Bertrand and project manager John Longley. Furthermore, it is well established that Lexcen had been experimenting with wing adaptations to the undersurface appendages of boats before, including his 1958 skiffs Taipan and Venom, although in the latter application they were not determined to be effective and not further adopted.

In 1983, Lexcen had commented on the design issue: "I have in mind to admit it all to the New York Yacht Club that I really owe the secret of the design to a Greek guy who helped me out and was invaluable. He's been dead for 2000 years. Bloody Archimedes..."

In May 2024 after the release of the Netflix TV documentary 'Untold: The Race Of The Century' (2020), Peter van Oossanen & Martin Peterson published an article in the Journal of Science Engineering Ethics claiming that Ben Lexcen should not have been named as the inventor or designer.

== Competitions ==
=== Louis Vuitton Cup ===
Australia II dominated the 1983 Louis Vuitton Cup before defeating Azzurra in the semi-finals and Victory '83 in the final to win the trophy and earn the right to challenge for the America's Cup.

=== America's Cup ===
Australia II, bearing sail number KA6, represented the Royal Perth Yacht Club of Australia in its September 1983 challenge for the America's Cup. The defender, the New York Yacht Club, had held the cup since 1851, dominating challengers and sustaining the longest winning streak in sport.

Australia II, skippered by John Bertrand, faced Dennis Conner sailing the 12-metre Liberty in the ocean off Newport, Rhode Island. Australia II came from behind to prevail 4 races to 3. The victory on 26 September 1983 was a landmark event for the nation of Australia, not to mention the Royal Perth Yacht Club. The achievement was underscored when Australia II was awarded the ABC Wide World of Sports Athlete of the Year for 1983. The crew of Australia II for the America's Cup races was John Bertrand (skipper), Will Baillieu, Colin Beashel, Rob Brown, Peter Costello, Damian Fewster, James Hardy (alternate helm), Ken Judge, Skip Lissiman, John Longley, Scott McAllister, Brian Richardson, Phil Smidmore, Grant Simmer, and Hugh Treharne. Beashel was an Olympic medal winning sailor who competed at six Olympic games. Richardson was a dual-Olympian oarsman who had stroked the Australian men's eight at the Moscow 1980 Olympics and Baillieu had also rowed for Australia, in a coxed four at the 1972 Munich Olympics.

== Popular culture ==
The Boxing Kangaroo was the official mascot of the Australia II effort.

The win was received with much enthusiasm in Australia, with the Men at Work song "Down Under" becoming the official anthem for the crew.

== Retirement ==
In the mid-1980s, Australia II was sold by Alan Bond to the Australian government. She was lent to the Australian National Maritime Museum in Sydney for display in 1991. In 2000, Australia II was removed from the National Maritime Museum and transferred to the WA Maritime Museum in Fremantle. For the 150th anniversary celebrations of the America's Cup in 2001, she was removed from the museum and shipped to the Isle of Wight, sailing with the original crew for several days of commemorative regattas. Australia II was returned to the Western Australian Maritime Museum, where she is on permanent display.

In 2017, the Team of Australia II were among the inaugural inductees to the Australian Sailing Hall of Fame.
