= 1983 America's Cup =

Boat race

25th America's Cup
Defender United States
- Defender club: New York Yacht Club
- Yacht: Liberty

Challenger Australia
- Challenger club: Royal Perth Yacht Club
- Yacht: Australia II

Competition
- Location: Newport, Rhode Island, United States
- Dates: 14–26 September 1983
- Rule: 12-metre
- Winner: Royal Perth Yacht Club
- Score: 4–3

The 1983 America's Cup was a 12-metre class yacht racing series which pitted the defending New York Yacht Club's Liberty against the Royal Perth Yacht Club's challenger, Australia II. The September 1983 series of match races was won by Australia II, with four race wins to three, in the first successful challenge of the New York Yacht Club's 132-year defense of the Cup. The Australian syndicate's boat, skippered by John Bertrand, fought back from a 3–1 deficit to best the Dennis Conner-helmed defender, ending both the longest winning streak in sporting history and U.S. domination of the racing series.

== The defender: Liberty ==
Liberty won all the Defender trials and on 2 September 1983, the New York Yacht Club confirmed that Liberty was to represent the club as defender of the America's Cup.

The crew included team principal Dennis Conner as skipper, Tom Whidden, navigator Halsey Chase Herreshoff, Scott Vogel, and mainsheet trimmer John Marshall.

During the summer preceding the trials Conner had been the focus of extensive media attention in the U.S., including an appearance on the cover of Sports Illustrated magazine, a rare recognition for a sailor.

Liberty had competed with John Kolius' Courageous, and Tom Blackaller's Defender (sail no. US–33), in a defender series before being selected by the New York Yacht Club. Gary Jobson was the founder and tactician of the Courageous/Defender syndicate.

== The challenger: Australia II ==
Alan Bond arrived at Newport with Australia II, billed as one of the biggest threats to American dominance of the 12 Metre class. The boat was designed by Ben Lexcen and skippered by John Bertrand. The revolutionary "winged keel" of the Australian yacht was a subject of controversy from the outset of the challenger series, with the New York Yacht club alleging that the winged keel boat was not a legal 12 Meter, and that the keel design itself was the result of Dutch engineers, and not by Lexcen. This second point could have made Australia II illegal under the requirement that the boat be "designed and constructed in country" as the Deed of Gift that governed the competition stipulated. The boat was ruled a legal 12 Meter, and she was allowed to participate in the regatta. The speed of the new contender, along with the controversy and protests intensified international media attention to the series.

Australia II dominated the challenger series and entered the America's Cup finals as the most promising contender to date.

== The races ==
The U.S. yacht won the first and second races by margins of more than a minute when the Australian yacht suffered equipment failure, but the Australia II took the third race, and came back to win the fifth and sixth races after Liberty won the fourth. This was the first time the America's Cup had needed a sixth race, let alone a seventh.

Date	Winner	Yacht	Loser	Yacht	Score	Delta
14 September 1983	Liberty	US-40	Australia II	KA-6	0-1	1:10
15 September 1983	Liberty	US-40	Australia II	KA-6	0-2	1:33
18 September 1983	Australia II	KA-6	Liberty	US-40	1-2	3:14
20 September 1983	Liberty	US-40	Australia II	KA-6	1-3	0:43
21 September 1983	Australia II	KA-6	Liberty	US-40	2-3	1:47
22 September 1983	Australia II	KA-6	Liberty	US-40	3-3	3:25
26 September 1983	Australia II	KA-6	Liberty	US-40	4-3	0:41

The cup title came down to the seventh and final race. For the seventh and deciding race on 26 September 1983 the wind was light at around eight knots. The pre-start was not a typical match race start. "Neither party wanted to make a mistake and end up in the protest room," Conner would explain later. Liberty won the start by eight seconds ahead of Australia II on paper but the Australians held a controlling position at the favoured end sailing toward the favoured side which gave them the early lead. Australia II was subsequently overtaken by Conner who built up what seemed to be an unassailable margin. At the start of the penultimate leg (a square run) the America's Cup looked like it would stay in Newport. However, Conner knew Australia II was not beaten. He and his tactician checked Australia II's relative speed and realised that Australia II would overtake Liberty before the leeward mark, despite Liberty's lead. Liberty had been reconfigured for light air performance, sacrificing downwind speed. This leg was the only square run of the race (Fremantle had two) so the issue had not yet been a factor in the race. Conner opted not to "cover" Australia II (it is not possible to "cover" when running downwind because the astern vessel blankets the lead boat's breeze) and instead kept well clear of Australia II's wind-shadow and went searching for favourable wind shifts. He was unsuccessful in this and Australia II overtook Liberty by the leeward mark. Conner then engaged Australia II in a spectacular tacking duel with nearly 50 tacks including a number of faked "dummy" tacks trying to break the Australians' cover. Australia II held on until both boats reached the starboard layline in amongst the spectator fleet and tacked several boat lengths ahead of Liberty and sailed to the finish to take the race. Australia II crossed the finish line with a winning margin of 41 seconds, becoming the first successful challenger in the 132 years "since the schooner America won it in a race around England's Isle of Wight in 1851".

== Aftermath ==
The final race was televised in Australia in the early hours of 27 September 1983 (Australian time) just before dawn, and the victory was celebrated in public venues across Australia. Prime Minister Bob Hawke was interviewed at the dawn celebration at Royal Perth Yacht Club, Western Australia. After humorously fending off repeated questioning by journalists about whether he would declare a public holiday he admitted this was a state matter and outside his power as Prime Minister. He joked that he thought it should be and that any state Premiers who disagreed with him might "find themselves in a spot of bother". To rapturous laughter and applause, he said with finality: "Any boss who sacks a worker for not turning up today is a bum".

In stark contrast to Australia, the loss of the 1983 America's Cup was considered a time of shame in U.S. sailing, as the U.S. had been able to defend the Cup for 132 years in a row. Dennis Conner took the loss hard. Asked about how he felt initially after losing the Cup, Conner said: "It was awful. I just did not want to get out of bed in the morning. I am usually full of life and energy... I just wanted to hide".

The America's Cup was transferred from the New York Yacht Club to the Royal Perth Yacht Club located in Perth, Western Australia, which subsequently hosted its first, but unsuccessful, defence in the 1987 America's Cup. After losing the Cup, the U.S. had been determined to bring it back. Conner went to work on the next US America's Cup Campaign. With the help of designers Britton Chance Jr., Bruce Nelson and David Pedrick, the boat Stars and Stripes 87 was created which, after progressively gaining speed in a grueling challenger series, became the 1987 challenger. Stars and Stripes sailed against Kookaburra, the Australian defender, with Conner winning the 1987 America's Cup and returning it to the U.S. The 1992 film Wind portrays in large part the loss of the 1983 Cup and the journey to regain it at the 1987 Challenge. While parts of the film take some creative license with the actual events, Wind has generally been acclaimed as the single most accurate and realistic sailing film ever made, capturing not only the technical and physical challenges of sailing, but also the realistic and daily culture and lifestyle of professional yachtsmen and yachtswomen. Despite competing in the first 26 America's Cups, the New York Yacht Club has never been in an America's Cup final since their loss in 1983. The next non-American club to win the Cup would be Royal New Zealand Yacht Squadron in 1995.

In retrospect, Conner said that losing the Cup in 1983 had been good for the sport of sailing and the Cup itself: "Me losing after 132 years was the best thing that ever happened to the America's Cup and the best thing that ever happened to Dennis Conner...Before the win by the Australians, the America's Cup was only big in the minds of the yachties, but the rest of the world didn't know or care about it at all. But when we lost it... it was a little bit like losing the Panama Canal - suddenly everyone appreciated it. If I hadn't lost it, there never would have been the national effort... without that there never would have been the ticker-tape parade up Fifth Avenue in New York, lunch with the President at the White House and all the doors of opportunity that it opened".
