= List of IACC regattas =

The following is a list of regattas that involve IACC yachts. International America's Cup Class (IACC) yachts were designed for the America's Cup, with specifications released in 1989 after the debacle of the 1988 America's Cup. Since then they have been used for every America's Cup from 1989 until 2010 when the class was replaced, as well as a series of other events, such as the IACC Worlds and the Louis Vuitton regattas. The IACC class was not used during the 2010 America's Cup due to a disagreement between defender Alinghi and the challenger of record BMW Oracle. A deed of gift match was instead setup that favored newly designed multihulls, which was won by the trimaran design of BMW Oracle. Equalized IACC class yachts were being match raced through the Louis Vuitton Trophy through 2010. The IACC class was replaced at the 34th America's Cup in 2013, by the catamarans of the AC72 class, and in the America's Cup World Series (which replaced the Louis Vuitton Series) with AC45 class.

Currently 100 sail numbers have been issued to IACC yachts.

== List ==
| Year | Event | Winner | Yacht | Skipper | Runner-up | Yacht | Venue |
|---|---|---|---|---|---|---|---|
| 1991 | World Championships | (Italy) Il Moro di Venezia | ITA 15 | Paul Cayard | (New Zealand) NZ Challenge | | San Diego, United States |
| 1992 | Louis Vuitton Cup | (Italy) Il Moro di Venezia | ITA 25 | Paul Cayard | (New Zealand) NZ Challenge | NZL 20 | San Diego, United States |
| 1992 | Citizen Cup | (United States) America³ | USA 23 | Bill Koch, Buddy Melges | (United States) Starts & Stripes | USA 11 | San Diego, United States |
| 1992 | America's Cup | (United States) America³ | USA 23 | Bill Koch, Buddy Melges | (Italy) Il Moro di Venezia | ITA 25 | San Diego, United States |
| 1994 | World Championships | oneAustralia | AUS 31 | John Bertrand | | | San Diego, United States |
| 1995 | Louis Vuitton Cup | Team New Zealand | NZL 32 | Russell Coutts | oneAustralia | AUS 31 | San Diego, United States |
| 1995 | Citizen Cup | (United States) Stars & Stripes | USA 34 | Dennis Conner | (United States) America³ | USA 36 | San Diego, United States |
| 1995 | America's Cup | Team New Zealand | NZL 32 | Russell Coutts | (United States) Starts & Stripes | USA 36 | San Diego, United States |
| 1997 | Road to the America's Cup | Team New Zealand | N/A | Russell Coutts | (United Kingdom) Spirit of Britain Challenge | N/A | Auckland, New Zealand |
| 2000 | Louis Vuitton Cup | (Italy) Prada Challenge | ITA 45 | Francesco de Angelis | (United States) AmericaOne | USA-61 | Auckland, New Zealand |
| 2000 | America's Cup | Team New Zealand | NZL 60 | Russell Coutts, Dean Barker | (Italy) Prada Challenge | ITA 45 | Auckland, New Zealand |
| 2002 | Road to the America's Cup | Team New Zealand | N/A | Dean Barker | (United States) One World | USA 55 | Auckland, New Zealand |
| 2003 | Louis Vuitton Cup | (Switzerland) Alinghi | SUI 64 | Russell Coutts | (United States) BMW Oracle Racing | USA 76 | Auckland, New Zealand |
| 2003 | America's Cup | (Switzerland) Alinghi | SUI 64 | Russell Coutts | Team New Zealand | NZL 82 | Auckland, New Zealand |
| 2004 | Louis Vuitton ACC Championship; Louis Vuitton Acts 1–3 | Team New Zealand | NZL 82 | Dean Barker | (United States) BMW Oracle Racing | USA 76 | Marseille, France; Valencia, Spain |
| 2005 | Louis Vuitton ACC Championship; Louis Vuitton Acts 4–9 | (Switzerland) Alinghi | SUI 75 | Brad Butterworth, Ed Baird | Team New Zealand | NZL 82 | Valencia, Spain; Malmö, Sweden; Trapani, Italy |
| 2006 | Louis Vuitton ACC Championship; Louis Vuitton Acts 10–12 | Team New Zealand | NZL 84 | Dean Barker | (Switzerland) Alinghi | SUI 75 | Valencia, Spain |
| 2007 | Louis Vuitton Act 13 | (Switzerland) Alinghi | SUI 91 | Brad Butterworth, Ed Baird | Team New Zealand | NZL 84 | Valencia, Spain |
| 2007 | Louis Vuitton Cup | Team New Zealand | NZL 92 | Dean Barker | (Italy) Luna Rossa Challenge | ITA 94 | Valencia, Spain |
| 2007 | America's Cup | (Switzerland) Alinghi | SUI 100 | Brad Butterworth, Ed Baird | Team New Zealand | NZL 92 | Valencia, Spain |
| 2008 | CNEV Regatta | (Switzerland) Alinghi | | | (Italy) Luna Rossa | | Valencia, Spain |
| 2009 | Louis Vuitton Pacific Series | Team New Zealand | N/A | Dean Barker | (Switzerland) Alinghi | N/A | Auckland, New Zealand |
| 2009 | Louis Vuitton Trophy Nice | (Italy) Azzurra | | | Team New Zealand | | Nice, France |
| 2010 | Louis Vuitton Trophy Auckland | Team New Zealand | | | (Italy) Mascalzone Latino | | Auckland, New Zealand |
| 2010 | Louis Vuitton Trophy La Maddalena | Team New Zealand | | | (Russia) Team Synergy | | La Maddalena, Italy |
| 2010 | Louis Vuitton Trophy Dubai | Team New Zealand | NZL 92 | Dean Barker | (United States) BMW Oracle Racing | | Dubai, United Arab Emirates |

== See also ==
- List of IACC yachts
