= Mighty Mary (sailing yacht) =

American America's Cup yacht

- Other names: USA-43
- Yacht club: San Diego Yacht Club
- Nation: United States
- Class: International America's Cup Class
- Sail no: USA-43
- Designer(s): Doug Peterson, Jim Taylor
- Builder: Eric Goetz Custom Sailboats
- Launched: 1994
- Owner(s): Bill Koch (America^{3})

Racing career
- Skippers: Dawn Riley
- AC Defender Selection Series: 1995 Citizen Cup

Specifications
- Type: Monohull
- Crew: 16

Notes
- Sold to +39 Challenge

Mighty Mary was an American International America's Cup Class yacht that was a competitor for the 1995 America's Cup Defender series. The team was part of Bill Koch's America^{3} syndicate and featured the sport's first nearly all female crew.

== Details ==
The team was captained by well-known female sailor Dawn Riley and featured sailors such as Leslie Egnot and J. J. Isler.

After establishing a commanding lead, the team narrowly lost to Dennis Connor's Stars & Stripes (who then went on to compete in the 1995 America's Cup) after being overtaken on the last leg.

This campaign was captured in a new 2026 documentary film, MIGHTY MARY, directed by Mary Mazzio and narrated by Hugh Jackman and Elizabeth Banks. The film recounts the story of a ground-breaking women’s sailing team which contended for the famed America’s Cup, the holy grail for one of sport’s most elite and exclusive events. The film, winner of Maria Mitchell Award, was produced in partnership with Skydance Sports, opened theatrically across the country in September of 2026 with AMC Theatres and will be distributed by Paramount/Republic Pictures. The America’s Cup ushered in the 38th running of the Cup with a signature event featuring MIGHTY MARY, along with the film’s director and 16 of the sailors from this team.
