= 1992 Citizen Cup (sailing) =

1992 Citizen Cup San Diego, United States
Date	January 14 – April 30, 1992
Defending champions	Stars & Stripes

The 1992 Citizen Cup was the defender selection series regatta for the 1992 America's Cup, held in the United States. Two defense syndicates (featuring five IACC yachts) competed over four round robins in order earn a berth in the Citizen Cup finals; the winner earned the right to defend the America's Cup against the winner of the Louis Vuitton Cup (challenger selection series regatta).

== Citizen Cup Competition ==
The 1992 Citizen Cup featured the emergence of the America^{3} Foundation syndicate headed by American businessman Bill Koch.

=== America^{3} ===
The America^{3} syndicate included helmsman Buddy Melges, Gary Jobson, John Kostecki and Andreas Josenhans.

== Teams ==
Sail	Yacht	Syndicate	Yacht club	Nation
USA–9	Jayhawk	America³ Foundation	San Diego Yacht Club	United States
USA–18	Defiant	America³ Foundation	San Diego Yacht Club	United States
USA–23	America³	America³ Foundation	San Diego Yacht Club	United States
USA–28	Kanza	America³ Foundation	San Diego Yacht Club	United States
USA–11	Stars & Stripes	Team Dennis Conner	San Diego Yacht Club	United States

== Round Robin 1 ==
Yacht	Won	Lost	Points	Total points
Defiant	6	0	6	6
Stars & Stripes	3	3	3	3
Jayhawk	0	6	0	0

== Round Robin 2 ==
Yacht	Won	Lost	Points	Total points
America^{3}	5	1	10	16
Stars & Stripes	2	4	4	7
Defiant	2	4	4	4

== Round Robin 3 ==
Yacht	Won	Lost	Points	Total points
America^{3}	8	1	32	48
Stars & Stripes	3	5	12	19
Defiant	2	7	8	12

== Round Robin 4 ==
Yacht	Won	Lost	Points	Total points
Stars & Stripes	5	4	5	6
America^{3}	5	3	5	5
Kanza	3	5	3	5

== Finals ==
America^{3} held off a rally by Stars & Stripes to win the Citizen Cup. America^{3} went on to successfully defend the 1992 America's Cup against Italy's Il Moro di Venezia V.

Yacht	Won	Lost	Points
America^{3}	7	4	7
Stars & Stripes	4	7	4
