= America³ (1992 yacht) =

1992 International America's Cup Class yacht

Coordinates: 41°39′48″N 71°16′21″W

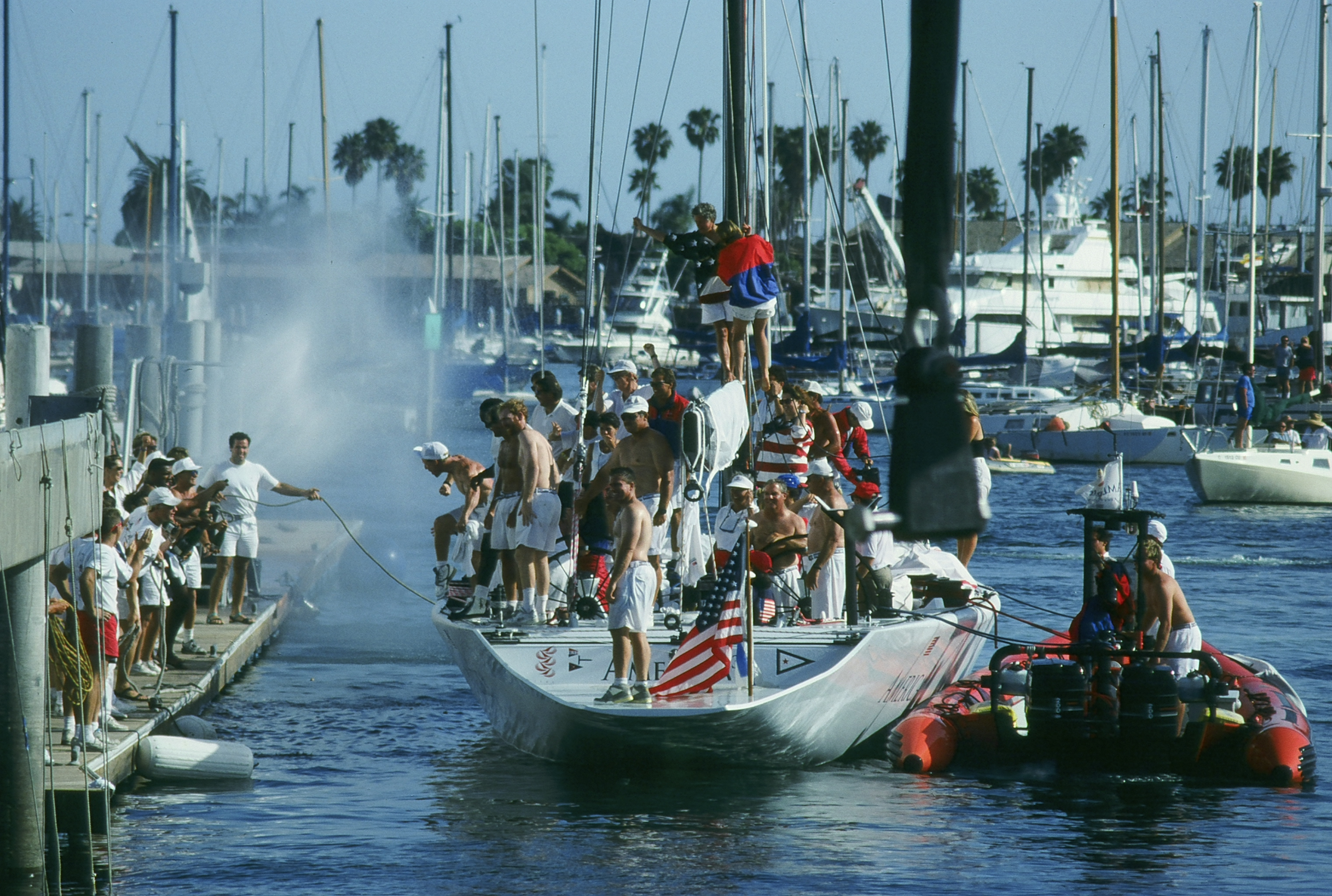
- USA-23 and crew of America^{3} returns to America's Cup Harbor in 1992 after successfully defending the America's Cup, defeating the Italian challenger Il Moro di Venezia.
- Yacht club: San Diego Yacht Club
- Nation: United States
- Class: International America's Cup Class
- Sail no: USA–23
- Designer(s): Doug Peterson, Jerry Milgram, Vincent Moeyersoms, Heiner Meldner
- Builder: Goetz Custom Sailboats, Inc.
- Launched: 1992
- Owner(s): America³; West Palm Beach, FL, USA

Racing career
- Skippers: Bill Koch; Buddy Melges
- Notable victories: 1992 Citizen Cup; 1992 America's Cup
- America's Cup: 1992 America's Cup
- AC Defender Selection Series: 1992 Citizen Cup; 1995 Citizen Cup

Specifications
- Length: 23.77 m (78.0 ft) (LWL); 18.29 m (60.0 ft) (LOA)
- Beam: 5.45 m (17.9 ft)
- Sail area: 298 m^{2} (3,210 sq ft)

America^{3} (USA–23) (pronounced "America cubed") was an American International America's Cup Class (IACC) yacht that successfully defended the 1992 America's Cup challenge from the Il Moro Challenge racing syndicate.

America^{3} was one of the yachts built for the America^{3} Foundation racing syndicate, headed by American businessman Bill Koch, for the 1992 Citizen Cup. Four IACC yachts were ordered:

- Jayhawk (USA-9)
- Defiant (USA-18)
- Kanza (USA-28)
- America^{3} (USA-23)

The yacht selected for competition, America^{3}, was fastest. It was launched in 1992.

America^{3} won the Citizen Cup, then successfully defended the America's Cup against the challenge of the Italian yacht Il Moro di Venezia V (ITA-25), winner of the 1992 Louis Vuitton Cup. Koch was inducted into the America's Cup Hall of Fame in 1993.

The America^{3} Foundation racing syndicate entered the 1995 Citizen Cup with an all women's programme. The team sailed America^{3} in the first three stages of the Round Robin, then switched to their newly delivered yacht Mighty Mary for the remainder of the event.

In 2005 America^{3} and Il Moro di Venezia V were on display at the Boston Museum of Fine Arts. Defiant is on display at the Herreshoff Marine Museum in Bristol, Rhode Island. Jayhawk is on display at the Wichita Boathouse in Wichita, Kansas.
