= Alamitos Bay Yacht Club =

- Burgee
- Short name: ABYC
- Founded: August 14, 1924; 102 years ago
- Location: 7201 East Ocean Blvd., Long Beach, California 90803
- Website: www.abyc.org

Alamitos Bay Yacht Club is a yacht club located in Alamitos Bay (Long Beach, California), United States. The club belongs to the Southern California Yachting Association.

== History ==
Alamitos Bay Yacht Club was founded on August 14, 1924, by twelve local sailors and boat builders. On May 30, 1926, ABYC was formally organized with Richard L. Russell Sr., elected the first Commodore, and ABYC was incorporated within the laws of the State of California on January 28, 1928.

== Racing ==
Besides many National and North American Championships, the Clifford Day Mallory Cup in 1976 and the 2002 Snipe Western Hemisphere & Orient Championship, ABYC hosted the following World Championships:

- 1974 Finn Gold Cup / Open Worlds
- 1977 Tornado World Championship
- 1979 International 14 World Championships
- 1981 Open Snipe World Championship
- 1991 ISAF World Women's Sailing Championship
- 1993 Tornado World Championship
- 1997 A-Cat World Championship
- 1999 Melges 24 World Championship
- 2006 International 14 World Championships
- 2019 Viper 640 World Championship

== Sailors ==
Chuck Kober, who started sailing Snipes in the 1930s, was continental champion in Dragon in 1964 and became president of the United States Yacht Racing Union (USYRU) in 1982. Peter Barrett was gold medallist in Star at the 1968 Summer Olympics and silver at the 1964 Summer Olympics. Steve Bloemke and Gregg Morton won the Snipe Junior World Championship in 1982. Allison Jolly, also a former Snipe sailor, became the first-ever Gold medalist in the women's 470 event at the 1988 Summer Olympics while John Shadden won the bronze medal in the men's 470. John Latiolait, Jerry Montgomery, Jim McLeod, Don Reiman and Dave Thompson won the Transpacific Yacht Race in 1997. Howard Hamlin and Mike Martin won the 505 World Championship in 1999. Sarah Glaser won a silver medal in the 470 class at the Summer Olympics and was named US Sailor of the Year in 2000.
