= Citizen Cup =

The Citizen Cup is a trophy which was awarded to the winner of a regatta held in 1992 and again in 1995 to decide on a defender of the America's Cup.

== History ==
The America's Cup Match is always raced between two yachts from different countries. This means that any syndicate from the country of the defending yacht club would not be participating in the challenger series. The yacht club defending the America's Cup staged a series of races to select the yacht to defend and race against the challenger for the America's Cup. For many years a defender series had been a part of the defender selection process and in 1992 Citizen Watch offered the Citizen Cup to be awarded to the winner of the defender selection series. In parallel the challengers competed for the Louis Vuitton Cup and the winner went on to challenge for the America's Cup.

The 1995 Citizen Cup regatta was won by the yacht Stars & Stripes, entered by the "Sail America" syndicate. The defending San Diego Yacht Club opted to have the crew of Stars & Stripes, skippered by Dennis Conner, use the second-place yacht Young America in the America's Cup Match against Challenger Black Magic representing the Royal New Zealand Yacht Squadron. Young America had been entered by John Marshall's PACT95 syndicate. Black Magic won the 1995 America's Cup Match 5-0.

== Today ==
The Citizen Cup was discontinued after the 1995 regatta. Beginning with the 2000 America's Cup the defending yacht club has opted not to hold a defense selection regatta—America's Cup winners New Zealand and Switzerland have not had the resources to field multiple teams, while the United States chose to stand with 2010 Cup champion BMW Team Oracle for the 2013 competition.

== Citizen Cup winners ==
| Regatta | Sail | Yacht | Club | Venue |
|---|---|---|---|---|
| 1992 Citizen Cup | USA-23 | America³ | (United States) San Diego Yacht Club | San Diego, United States |
| 1995 Citizen Cup | USA-34 | Stars & Stripes | (United States) San Diego Yacht Club | San Diego, United States |

== See also ==
- Louis Vuitton Cup – the challengers series for America's Cup
