= Dawn Riley =

American sailor

Personal information
- Born: July 21, 1964 (age 62) Michigan, U.S.

Sailing career
- Sport: Sailing
- College team: Michigan State University
- Club: North Star Sail Club

Dawn Riley (born July 21, 1964) is an American sailor, and a pioneer in the sport of sailboat racing. She is in the National Sailing Hall of Fame and the international America's Cup Hall of Fame and the State of Michigan Sports Hall of Fame. The only person to do this. She sailed in four America's Cups and two Whitbread Round the World races. She was the watch captain on Maiden, the first all-women's entry in the Whitbread race, and was the team captain of the first all-women's team in the America's Cup. She later established the America True Foundation to encourage youth participation in sailing. Since 2010 she has run Oakcliff Sailing dedicated to Building American Leaders Through Sailing

== Early life ==
Born in 1964, Dawn Riley grew up in Detroit, Michigan. Her parents were Chuck and Prudence Riley, and she was the eldest of three children. She began racing sailboats at age 13, and became Commodore of the Sea Scout program at the North Star Sail Club on Lake St. Clair. She also participated in track and field and is the Discus record holder at L’Anse Creuse High School.

== Sailing career ==
In 1989-90, Riley joined the crew of Maiden, skippered by Tracy Edwards, which was the first all-women's boat to participate in the Whitbread Round the World sailboat race (now known as The Ocean Race). Riley was the watch captain, diver and engineer. They sailed a very competitive race, and gained significant media exposure, raising the visibility of women in the sport.

Riley then raced in the America’s Cup on the America^{3} team in 1992. She was the pit man in the Defender Series, becoming the first woman to have an active racing role aboard an America's Cup contender. Bill Koch was the skipper and patron of the team, which then went on to win the 1992 America's Cup.

The following year, Riley was the skipper of Heineken, an all-women's entry in the 1993-94 Whitbread race, the only all women's boat in the race. Riley flew in to Uruguay to take on the skipper duties after Nance Frank stepped down, following a dispute among the team members on the first leg of the race. She later wrote a book about the experience, entitled Taking the Helm.

For the 1995 America's Cup, Riley was the Team Captain for the all-women's team sailing on Mighty Mary, in the Defender Series. Mighty Mary, part of the America^{3} Syndicate, was sponsored by Bill Koch. Leading by a significant margin going into the last leg, Riley and the Mighty Mary team lost their wind, and Dennis Conner on Stars and Stripes was able to overtake them for the win in the final of the 1995 Citizen's Cup.

Riley served on the board of the Women's Sports Foundation from 1999 to 2006, and as the President for 2003 and 2004. She is also politically active in the Democratic Party. She is a motivational speaker, and has traveled widely, speaking about leadership and team building.

In 2007 Riley continued to work in the America's Cup, as the General Manager of the French Team for the America's Cup, Areva Challenge. In 2010, Riley became the executive director of Oakcliff Sailing. Oakcliff's mission is to improve the sport of sailing in the United States, and it operates out of Oyster Bay, New York with a fleet of over 100 racing boats, including the largest collection of Match 40s in the world.

== Awards ==
- BMW Foundation Young Leader
- World Champion – 2003 One Ton Cup
- World Champion – Women's World Cup 1992
- US Rolex Yachtswoman of the Year 1999
- Michigan State University – Alumni of the year
- Michigander of the Year – 1999
- Inducted into the Michigan Sports Hall of Fame – 2023
