= Willi Illbruck =

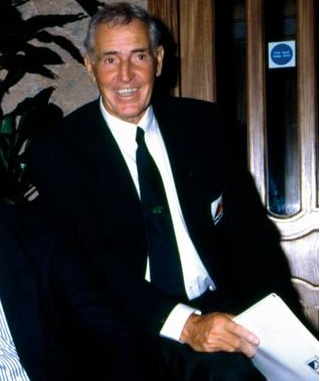
- Willi Illbruck, c. 1993
- Born: Wilhelm Gustav Illbruck; September 26, 1927; Opladen, Germany
- Died: November 21, 2004 (aged 77); Leverkusen, Pattscheid, Germany
- Occupations: Business, Engineering, Yachting
- Organization: Illbruck GmbH
- Spouse: Christiane Illbruck
- Children: Sabina Illbruck and Michael Illbruck
- Awards: Bundesverdienstkreuz

Wilhelm Gustav "Willi" Illbruck (September 26, 1927 – November 21, 2004) was a German industrialist, the founder and CEO of the Illbruck GmbH, and a notable yachtsman.

== Career ==
After education as a toolmaker, military service as a 16-year-old boy in the German Navy during World War II and five years of Soviet POW, he worked at the German Railways and later in the cardboard industry.

On September 26, 1952, Willi and Christiane Illbruck founded a small business for the production of steel wool dies in Leverkusen-Opladen. At first, the two-man business manufactured steel die-cutting tools and later plastic parts like platters, index tabs, lottery stencils etc. Within 20 years, the company had grown and established subsidiaries in Switzerland, Austria, France, Spain, Australia, and the USA.

In 1980, Willi Illbruck OH was turned into an incorporated firm named Illbruck GmbH.

In 2000, Illbruck GmbH was a privately held international company with six autonomous business units: Automotive, Sealant Systems, Sanitary Technology, Architectural Surfaces, Filtration Systems/Insulation Systems and IT Services. Illbruck GmbH had 35 locations in 15 countries worldwide and was headquartered in Leverkusen, Germany.

Following Willi Illbruck's death in 2004, Illbruck GmbH was restructured into Illbruck Sanitärtechnik GmbH, Pinta-Elements, Tremco Illbruck, Pinta Acoustics, and RPM International Inc.

== Personal life ==
Illbruck was married and has two children.

== Yachting ==
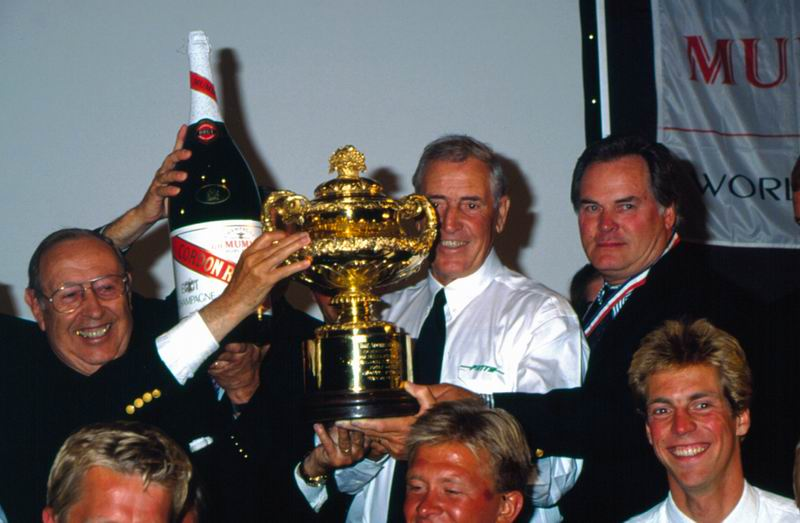
Hans-Otto Schumann, Willi and Udo Schütz celebrates Admirals Cup 93

In 1969, Illbruck named his first sailing yacht Pinta. The inspiration for the name was the historical Pinta, the fastest of the ships used by Christopher Columbus on his voyage to America. In the 1980s and 1990s, Illbruck dominated the German offshore yachting scene together with Udo Schütz and Hans-Otto Schumann. Illbruck and his yacht Pinta won the Admiral's Cup in 1983 and 1993 for Germany (skipper Russell Coutts ). The team also won the Sardinia Cup in 1984. Pinta won the One Ton Cup in 1993 (skipper Russell Coutts / helmsman Peter Lester) and 1994 (skipper John Kostecki / helmsman Rod Davis).

Illbruck’s commitment to yachting incentivized both his son, Michael Illbruck, and the crew members.

The Illbruck GmbH company was, under the leadership of his son, the main sponsor of the yacht Illbruck Challenge, the winner of the 2001–2002 Volvo Ocean Race (skipper John Kostecki).

== Honors ==
On July 2, 1994, Illbruck and the Pinta crew was awarded with the Silberne Lorbeerblatt, the highest sports award in Germany. On September 26, 2002, on his 75th birthday, Illbruck received the Bundesverdienstkreuz.
