= Stars & Stripes 88 =

- Yacht club: San Diego Yacht Club
- Nation: United States
- Sail no: US–1
- Designer(s): Gino J. Morelli, Britton Chance, Jr., Dave W. Hubbard & Duncan MacLane
- Builder: Robert Delong Boatworks Inc. (hull); Capistrano Beach, CA, US; Scaled Composite (rig); Mojave, CA, USA
- Launched: 4 June 1988

Racing career
- Skippers: Dennis Conner
- Notable victories: 1988 America's Cup
- America's Cup: 1988 America's Cup

Specifications
- Type: Catamaran
- Length: 18.26 m (59.9 ft) (LOA); 16.37 m (53.7 ft) (LWL)
- Beam: 8.88 m (29.1 ft)
- Sail area: 167 m^{2} (1,800 sq ft)

Stars & Stripes 88 is an American catamaran that successfully defended the 1988 America's Cup.

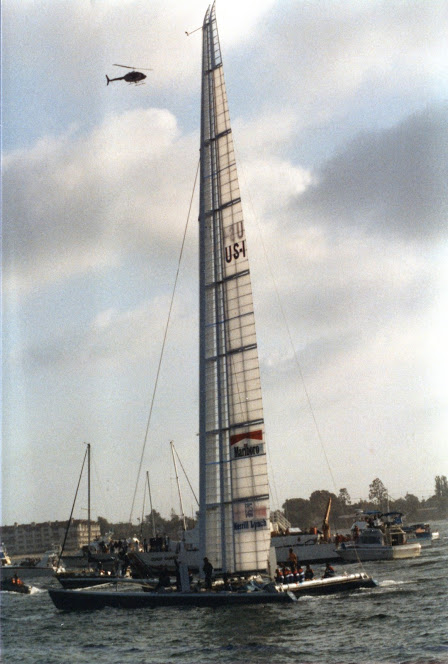
Stars and Stripes after winning the America's Cup and returning to harbor in San Diego, California, September 9, 1988.

Stars & Stripes won against KZ1 with 2–0 in matches.
