= America³ =

Yacht syndicate

America^{3}
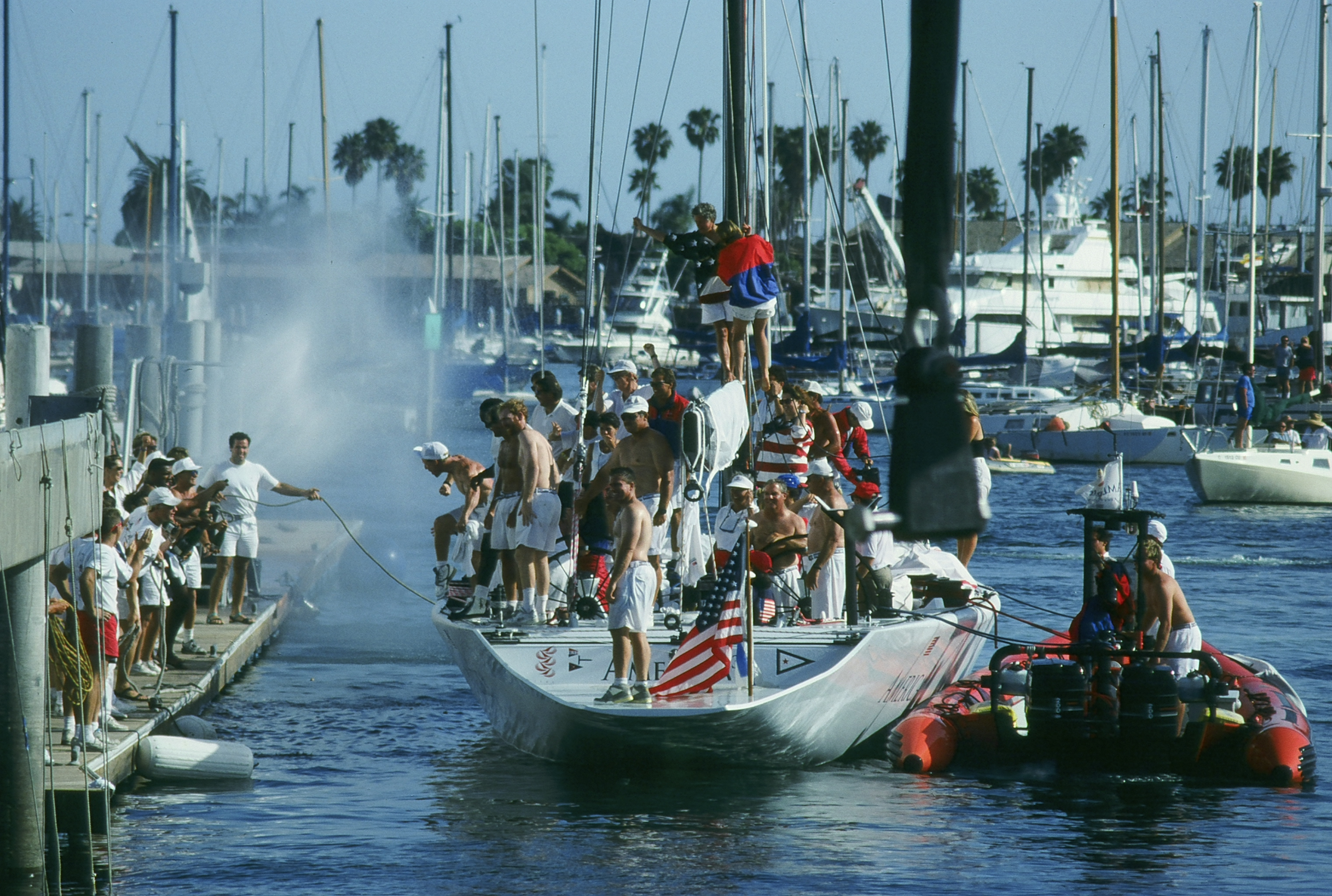
- USA-23 and crew of America^{3} returns to America's Cup Harbor in 1992 after successfully defending the America's Cup, defeating the Italian challenger Il Moro di Venezia.

Career
- Yacht club: San Diego Yacht Club
- Nation: United States
- Team principal(s): Bill Koch, America^{3} Foundation
- Notable victories: 1992 Citizen Cup; 1992 America's Cup

Yachts
- Sail no.: Boat name
- USA–23: America^{3}
- USA-43: Mighty Mary

America^{3} (pronounced "America Cubed") is the name of a syndicate that vied for the America's Cup in 1992 and 1995. One of their yachts shared the same name.

== 1992 Cup victory ==
The program was operated by Bill Koch and Harry "Buddy" Melges in the 1992 America's Cup. Four International America's Cup Class yachts were ordered:

- Jayhawk (USA-9)
- Defiant (USA-18)
- Kanza (USA-28)
- America^{3} (USA-23)

The yacht selected for competition, America^{3}, was fastest. It was built by Goetz Custom Sailboats Inc. in Rhode Island and the carbon fiber mast package was built by the Offshore Spars Co. in Michigan. After winning the Defender Series, America^{3} defeated the Italian challenger Il Moro di Venezia to successfully defend the Cup.

== 1995 Cup defense ==
In 1995, Bill Koch revamped the program to begin the first nearly all-female, America's Cup boat. The successor to America^{3}, Mighty Mary, was on her way to a race-off with Young America, the boat of the third syndicate that year, to determine who went through to the 1995 America's Cup, in the lead of what ended up being the last race of the Defender Series over Stars & Stripes. But with a commanding lead of nearly 5 minutes, Dave Dellenbaugh (the only man on the otherwise all-female crew) committed a crucial tactical error and Stars & Stripes skipper Dennis Conner made a series of moves to beat Mighty Mary to the finish line by scant seconds. After winning the Defender Series, Conner opted to use Young America to defend the cup, losing to Team New Zealand, 5–0.

The 1995 team consisted of the following members.

- Jenifer (J.J.) Isler (San Diego, California)
- Ann Nelson (San Diego, California)
- Elizabeth (Lisa) Charles (Provincetown, Rhode Island)
- Hannah Swett (Jamestown, Rhode Island)
- Joan Lee Touchette (Newport, Rhode Island)
- Shelley Beattie (Malibu, California)
- Stephanie Armitage-Johnson (Auburn, Washington)
- Dawn Riley (Detroit, Michigan)
- Merritt Carey (Tenants Harbor, Maine)
- Amy Baltzell (Wellesley, Massachusetts)
- Courtenay Becker (The Dalles, Oregon)
- Sarah Bergeron (Middletown, New Jersey)
- Dave Dellenbaugh (Norwalk, Connecticut)
- Sarah Cavanagh (Denver, Colorado)
- Leslie Egnot (born in South Carolina but moved to Auckland, New Zealand)
- Christie Evans (Marblehead, Massachusetts)
- Diana Klybert (Annapolis, Maryland)
- Susanne (Suzy) Leech Nairn (Annapolis, Maryland)
- Linda Lindquist (Chicago, Illinois)
- Stephanie Maxwell-Pierson (Somerville, New Jersey)
- Jane Oetking (Rockwell, Texas)
- Merritt Palm (Fort Lauderdale, Florida)
- Katherine (Katie) Pettibone (Coral Gables, Florida)
- Marci Porter (Oarton, Virginia)
- Melissa Purdy (Tiburon, California)
