= Peter Lester (sailor) =

New Zealand sailor and broadcaster (1954–2025)

Personal information
- Nationality: New Zealander
- Born: 14 August 1954 Christchurch, New Zealand
- Died: 8 August 2025 (aged 70)
- Occupation: Sailing coach
- Spouse(s): Susie Lester (m. c. 1980s)
- Children: 3

Peter Lester (14 August 1954 – 8 August 2025) was a New Zealand sailor, coach and broadcaster. A world champion and two-time New Zealand Yachtsman of the Year, he was a veteran of multiple America's Cup campaigns and later became one of the most recognised voices in international sailing commentary.

== Sailing career ==
=== Early career and world championship ===
Born in Christchurch on 14 August 1954, Lester learned to sail on Lyttelton Harbour. He achieved early international success in the OK dinghy class, winning the Junior World Championship in 1974 and finishing second at the senior world championship in 1975. In 1977, he won the OK Dinghy World Championship on home waters off Beach, becoming the first New Zealander to win a one-design world title in the country. For this achievement, he was named New Zealand Yachtsman of the Year for the first time.

=== Offshore and America's Cup campaigns ===
Lester was a reserve for New Zealand at the 1976 Summer Olympics. He qualified for the Finn class at the 1980 Olympics, but was unable to compete due to the USA-backed boycott of the Olympics in Russia. He then transitioned to offshore keelboat racing. In 1987, as helmsman on Propaganda, he was instrumental in the New Zealand team's victory at the Admiral's Cup, the country's only win in the event's history. Propaganda was also the top-scoring individual boat, and Lester was named New Zealand Yachtsman of the Year for a second time.

Lester's America's Cup career began with the 1988 America's Cup, where he was the tactician on board KZ 1 for the New Zealand Challenge. He coached the Spanish Desafio España Copa America challenge at the 1992 Louis Vuitton Cup. In 1993, he was the helmsman on's Pinta, which won the. He returned to the 1995 Louis Vuitton Cup as a sailor and tactician for the Tag Heuer Challenge.

In 2017, he returned to competitive sailing, competing in the Laser class at the in Auckland.

== Broadcasting career ==
Lester's broadcasting career began in 1992. After the Spanish team he was coaching was eliminated from the Louis Vuitton Cup, he was asked to join the commentary team as an expert analyst. He was an immediate success with viewers due to his clear, insightful analysis and accessible delivery style.

Over the next three decades, his voice became synonymous with major sailing events. He commentated on numerous America's Cup regattas and among other international events. His final role was as an on-water commentator for the world feed of the 2024 America's Cup.

== Personal life and death ==
Lester was married to his wife, Susie, for over 40 years, and they had three sons. He died on 8 August 2025, at the age of 70, after suffering a heart attack a week earlier.
