= 1988 America's Cup =

27th America's Cup
Defender United States
- Defender club: San Diego Yacht Club
- Yacht: Stars & Stripes 88

Challenger New Zealand
- Challenger club: Mercury Bay Boating Club
- Yacht: KZ-1

Competition
- Location: San Diego, United States
- Dates: September 7– September 9, 1988
- Rule: Deed of Gift
- Winner: San Diego Yacht Club
- Score: 2–0

The 1988 America's Cup was the 27th America's Cup regatta, and was contested between the defender, San Diego Yacht Club represented by Stars & Stripes H3, and the challenger, the Mercury Bay Boating Club represented by New Zealand Challenge's KZ-1. Run under strict Deed of Gift rules, the regatta was won by San Diego Yacht Club, in a two-race sweep.

== Challenge and response ==
The 1988 America's Cup was the first hostile Deed of Gift challenge. Dennis Conner had won the America's Cup for San Diego Yacht Club on February 4, 1987, at the 1987 America's Cup. In July, New Zealand banker Michael Fay went to the San Diego Yacht Club and issued a Notice of Challenge from the Mercury Bay Boating Club of New Zealand, which was based on a strict reading of the Deed of Gift. The Fay challenge stipulated that the boats to be sailed would be defined only by the details of the Deed, namely single masted yachts no more than 90 feet (27 m) at the waterline and that the race would be held the following year in 1988. He proposed to bring a 90-foot racing yacht for his challenge boat.

San Diego Yacht Club, who wanted to continue running the Cup regatta in 12-metre class yachts, initially rejected Fay's challenge out of hand. Fay then took the dispute to the New York State Supreme Court, which on 25 November 1987 declared the challenge valid and instructed San Diego Yacht Club to meet the challenge on the water, brushing aside the twenty-one 12 Meter syndicates that had declared their intention of racing in a 1991 America's Cup regatta.

The unconventional challenge was met with an unconventional response. As the challenge used the original Deed of Gift as its basis, there were no explicit class or design requirements other than that the boat was to be 90 feet (27 m) or less at the waterline if it had one mast. Thus San Diego Yacht Club and the Sail America Foundation chose the assuredly faster multi-hull design.

On 5 May 1988 the Cup returned to the courts with Michael Fay seeking a court ruling that the catamaran was an invalid defender. The court instead ruled that the cup should be contested on the water, and any further legal action should be delayed until after the race.

== Boats ==
The New Zealand challenger was KZ-1, a 120-foot (37 m) monohull with a crew of 30 to 40. The boat was launched in March 1988 and regarded as the fastest monohull at that time for its size. KZ-1 now resides outside the National Maritime Museum in downtown Auckland, New Zealand.

San Diego Yacht Club responded by building two catamarans, one with a conventional soft sail (Stars & Stripes S1), and the second with a Scaled Composites -built wing mast (Stars & Stripes H3). The wing-masted boat demonstrated superior performance, and after being modified to improve its structural integrity was chosen for the successful defense.

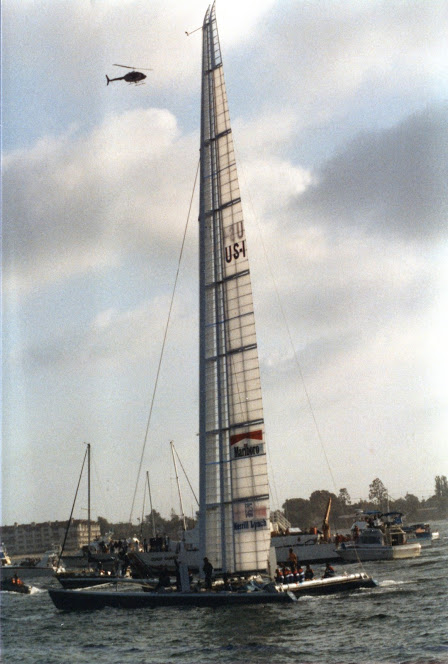
Stars and Stripes after winning the America's Cup and returning to harbor in San Diego, California, September 9, 1988.

== Crew ==
KZ-1 was skippered by David Barnes and the afterguard included tactician Peter Lester, navigator Richard Morris, Tom Schnackenberg and Bruce Farr.

The crew, which numbered 40 also included Jeremy Scantlebury, Robert Salthouse, Don Cowie, Warwick Fleury, Mark Hauser, Andrew Taylor, Edwin Askew, Marcus Brown, Bill Handy, Keith Hawkins, George Jakich, Paul Matich, Rubin Muir, Chris Salthouse, Alan Smith, Nick Heron, David Hurley, Peter Warren, Michael Fay, lawyer Andrew Johns, designer Russell Bowler, Clive Brown, Mike Drummond, Bob Graham, Murray Greenhalgh, Peter Jeromsen, Lance Manson and Chris Wilkins.

Rod Davis was New Zealand's sailing coach.

Stars & Stripes was skippered by Dennis Conner and the crew included navigator Peter Isler, John Marshall, Malin Burnham, Carl Buchan, Cam Lewis, John Barnitt, Bill Trenkle, Duncan MacLane, Louis Banks, John Grant, John Wake, Randy Smyth and tactician Tom Whidden.

== Results ==
Date	Course	Winner	Loser	Winning Time	Delta	Score	Winner's Velocity on Course	Notes
September 7, 1988	40 miles, windward leeward^{a}	Stars & Stripes USA-1	KZ-1	4:53:54	18:15	1-0	8.2	Wind 7 to 9 knots
September 9, 1988	39 miles, triangular^{b}	Stars & Stripes USA-1	KZ-1	3:27:37	21:10	2-0	11.3	Wind 6 to 15 knots

^a Twenty nautical miles per leg, out and return.

^b Thirteen nautical miles per leg; first leg upwind.

== Aftermath ==
After the completion of the races the battle returned to the courts and on 28 March 1989 the cup was awarded to New Zealand on the basis that the competition between a monohull and a catamaran was a gross mismatch and not in the spirit of friendly competition between countries. However the Appellate Division reversed that ruling, saying the Deed of Gift does not limit design or say anything about the number of hulls a yacht may have, and the reversal was confirmed on 26 April 1990 by the New York Court of Appeals. Thus San Diego retained the cup, defending it again at the 1992 America's Cup.

The 27th America's Cup put an end to the 12-metre era of yachts as the International America's Cup Class was developed for the next Cup defense.

The 2010 America's Cup shared some similarities with the 1988 Cup in that it was also the subject of intense litigation, and the precedent set by the 1988 court decision guaranteed that any non-mutual consent match would be sailed in the fastest boats legal under the Deed: multihulls. The build up to the 2010 America's Cup was slightly different though, in that a challenge had already been accepted by defending yacht club Société Nautique de Genève, but the courts decided that the challenger did not meet the requirements of the Deed of Gift governing the cup and forced the defender to accept a challenge from the Golden Gate Yacht Club instead.
