= Pinta (yacht) =

Series of racing yachts

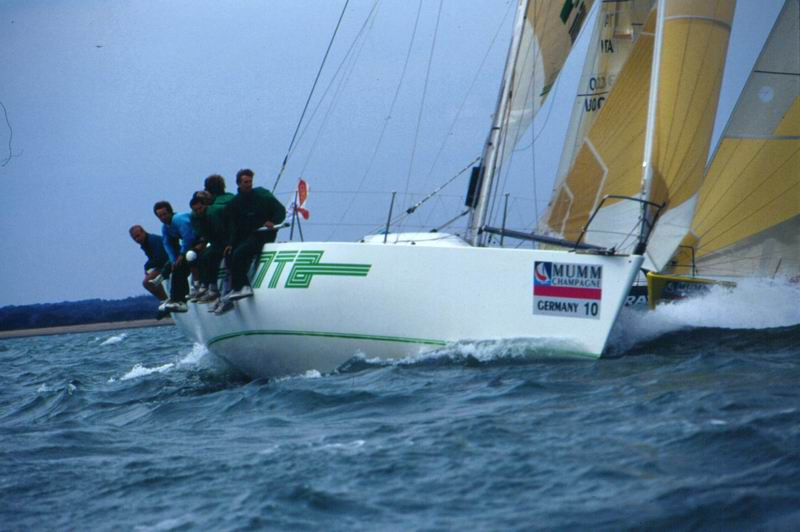
Pinta in the Solent near "West Lepe" mark, Admiral's Cup 1993

Pinta was a series of racing yachts owned by German industrialist and yachtsman Willi Illbruck. Pinta raced for DYC (Düsseldorfer Yachtclub) and KYC (Kieler Yacht Club).

Willi Illbruck started sailing his first Pinta, a one-ton yacht, in 1969. Pinta had its first international successes at the beginning of the 1970s and was runner-up in the 1975 Admiral's Cup, the first time it participated in the event.

Between 1982 and 1983, Willi Illbruck and Udo Schultz built 7/8-rigged boats using the new honeycomb technique. Germany won the 1983 Admiral's Cup with Willi Illbruck Pinta and Udo Schultz Container.

Introducing the slogan "The Fight Goes On!" in 1993, the year turned out to be "Year of the Cups", the most successful year in Pinta's history. With a 100% professional crew, Pinta won the Admiral's Cup and the 1993 One Ton Cup with Russell Coutts as skipper/tactician. Pinta defended the One Ton Cup again in 1994, now with John Kostecki as skipper/tactician and Rod Davis as helmsman.

John Kostecki continued as skipper/tactician on the team from 1994.

From 1998, Willi Illbruck's son, Michael Illbruck, continued his father's sporting commitment with yachts named Illbruck Challenge, Nela, and Pinta. The Volvo Ocean 60 yacht Illbruck Challenge won the 2001–02 Volvo Ocean Race.

== Picture gallery ==
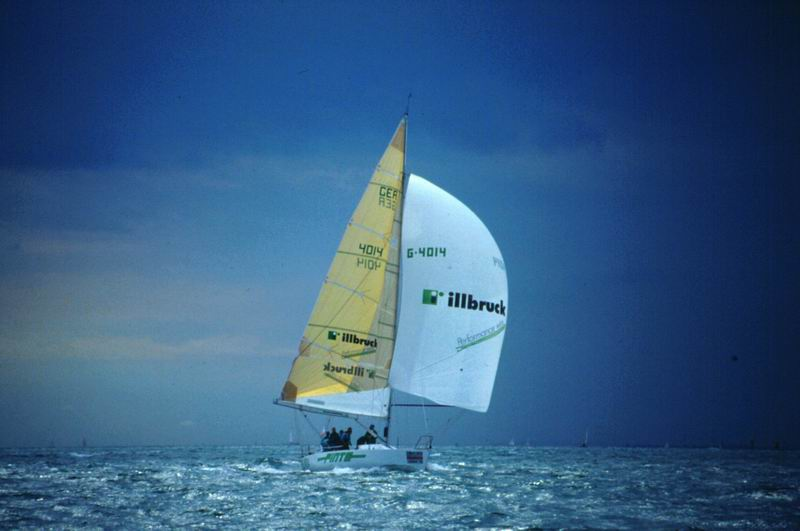
Pinta in Hayling Bay, east of Isle of Wight, Admiral's Cup 1993

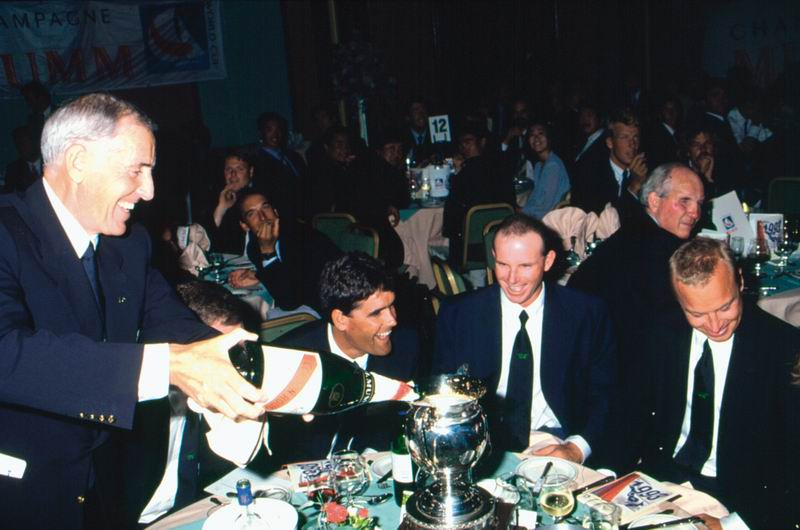
Willi celebrates the Admirals Cup 1993 win with Pinta team members Russell Coutts, Ross 'Roscow' Halcrow and Niels Henrik Sodemann, Plymouth 1993

== 1993, Year of the Cups ==
In 1993, Willi Illbruck gathered a new crew for the 1992 build Judel/Vrolijk designed One-Tonner, including Russell Coutts as skipper/tactician, Peter Lester as helmsman, Don Cowie, Ross 'Roscow' Halcrow, Alan Smith, Niels Henrik Sodemann, Uwe Roch, Gunnar Knierim, Thomas 'Beppo' Michaelsen and Arne Wilcken.

1993 marked a peak in the most successful year in Pinta's history, the "Year of the Cups". The Pinta crew started 1993 by winning the One Ton Cup in Cagliari, Sardinia sailing for Royal New Zealand Yacht Squadron, New Zealand.

The Pinta team sailed for Germany in Admiral's Cup, with German Jörg Diesch replacing Peter Lester as helmsman.

In 1993, after twenty-three years, IOR (International Offshore Rule) was the primary rule for racing around the world.

In the 1993 Champagne Mumm Admiral's Cup the German team of Pinta, Rubin XII (Hans-Otto Schumann) and Container (Udo Schütz) were outsiders before the start but clinched victory with 279.13 points seven races later by the narrowest ever margin, 0.25 points.

It was the fourth win for the Germans, who also won the series in 1973, 1983 and 1985. Schumann was part of the 1973 and 1985 winning teams, having started his run of twelve Admiral's Cups as far back as 1963. Willi Illbruck was a member of the 1983 line-up.

Willi Illbruck, owner of Pinta, and Hans-Otto Schumann, on his twelve Rubins, had supported the event for three decades.

In 1994, the Pinta crew was awarded with the Silberne Lorbeerblatt, the highest sports award in Germany.

== Regatta history ==
Yeay	Place	Regatta	Type	Designer	Builder
1973	1st	Cowes Week			
1975	2nd	Admiral's Cup			
1975	2nd	Admiral's Cup - individual placings			
1977	2nd	Southern Cross			
1978	1st	North Sea Week			
1978	1st	Kiel Week			
1979	3rd	SORC (Southern Ocean Racing Conference)			
1980	2nd	Sardinia Cup			
1981	3rd	Admiral's Cup			
1983	1st	Admiral's Cup			
1984	1st	SORC (Southern Ocean Racing Conference)			
1984	1st	Sardinia Cup			
1986	2nd	Sardinia Cup			
1988	3rd	Sardinia Cup			
1993	1st	One Ton Cup World Championship	IOR One Tonner	Judel / Vrolijk	Marten Marine, New Zealand
1993	1st	Admiral's Cup	IOR One Tonner	Judel / Vrolijk	Marten Marine, New Zealand
1993	1st	One Ton class at the Admiral's Cup	IOR One Tonner	Judel / Vrolijk	Marten Marine, New Zealand
1993	2nd	One-Ton World Cup	IOR One Tonner	Judel / Vrolijk	Marten Marine, New Zealand
1994	1st	One Ton Cup World Championship	IOR One Tonner	Judel / Vrolijk	Marten Marine, New Zealand
1994	1st	One-Ton World Cup	IOR One Tonner	Judel / Vrolijk	Marten Marine, New Zealand
1995	1st	North Sea Week	ILC-46 Racer	Judel / Vrolijk	Marten Marine, New Zealand
1995	1st	Kiel Week	ILC-46 Racer	Judel / Vrolijk	Marten Marine, New Zealand
1995	3rd	Admiral's Cup	ILC-46 Racer	Judel / Vrolijk	Marten Marine, New Zealand
1995	1st	ILC-46 class at the Admiral's Cup	ILC-46 Racer	Judel / Vrolijk	Marten Marine, New Zealand
1996	1st	SORC	ILC-46 Racer	Judel / Vrolijk	Marten Marine, New Zealand
1996	1st	ILC-46 World Championship (unofficial)	ILC-46 Racer	Judel / Vrolijk	Marten Marine, New Zealand
1996	1st	Copa del Rey	ILC-46 Racer	Judel / Vrolijk	Marten Marine, New Zealand
1996	3rd	Sardinia Cup	ILC-46 Racer	Judel / Vrolijk	Marten Marine, New Zealand
1997	2nd	ILC-40 World Championship	ILC-40 Racer	Judel / Vrolijk	Neville Hutton, United Kingdom
1997	2nd	ILC-40 World Cup	ILC-40 Racer	Judel / Vrolijk	Neville Hutton, United Kingdom
1997	2nd	Admiral's Cup	ILC-40 Racer	Judel / Vrolijk	Neville Hutton, United Kingdom
1997	1st	ILC-40 class at the Admiral's Cup	ILC-40 Racer	Judel / Vrolijk	Neville Hutton, United Kingdom
1998	1st	Newport/Manhattan Series			
1998	2nd	Kenwood Cup			
1998	2nd	San Francisco Big Boat Series			
