= Graham Biehl =

American sailor (born 1986)

Personal information
- Full name: Graham Porter Biehl
- Nationality: United States
- Born: August 31, 1986 (age 39) San Diego, California, U.S.
- Height: 1.78 m (5 ft 10 in)
- Weight: 73 kg (161 lb)

Sailing career
- Sport: Sailing
- Club: San Diego Yacht Club
- Coached by: Romain Bonnaud
- Class: Dinghy
Medal record
Sailing
Representing United States
Junior World Championship
Gold medal – first place	2003 Moscow, RUS	Snipe class
Silver medal – second place	2001 Mentor, USA	Snipe class

Graham Porter Biehl (born August 31, 1986, in San Diego, California) is an American sailor.

In 2003, in Moscow, Russia, he won the Junior World Championship of the Snipe class as a crew of Mikee Anderson-Mitterling, who was elected ICSA College Sailor of the Year in 2005. They were the second American team in history to do so, after Steve Bloemeke and Gregg Morton in 1982.

Afterwards, he specialized in the 470 class, with teammate Stuart McNay. Biehl was ranked among the top 10 in the world for two-person dinghy class by the International Sailing Federation, following his successes at the North American Championships and ISAF Sailing World Cup Series in Miami, Florida, United States, in 2012.

Graham is the nephew of Mark Reynolds, a three-time Olympic medalist and four-time Olympian in sailing who won gold in the mixed two-person keelboat at the Barcelona 1992 Olympic Games and Sydney 2000 Olympic Games.

He has been training for San Diego Yacht Club throughout most of his sporting career. During his Olympic campaigns, he and McNay were coached by Nigel Cochrane and Romain Bonnaud.

== Olympics ==
He represented the United States, along with his partner Stuart McNay in two editions of the Olympic Games (2008 and 2012).

=== Beijing 2008 ===
Biehl made his official debut at the 2008 Summer Olympics in Beijing, where he paired up with skipper Stuart McNay in the men's 470 class. The American duo finished thirteenth in a ten-round opening series with a net score of 105, edging out Israel's Gideon Kliger and Udi Gal by a tight, three-point gap from the final standings.

=== London 2012 ===
At the 2012 Summer Olympics in London, Biehl competed for the second time after qualifying the men's 470 class by finishing thirteenth and receiving a berth from the ISAF World Championships in Perth, Western Australia. Teaming again with McNay in the opening series, the American duo sailed from behind to post a net score of 108 points and establish a satisfying fourteenth-place finish in fleet of twenty-seven boats.
