= Chris Salthouse =

New Zealand sailor

Chris Salthouse is a New Zealand sailor who has sailed in multiple America's Cups.

He sailed on New Zealand Challenge's KZ 1 during the 1988 America's Cup and again in the 1992 Louis Vuitton Cup.

In the 1995 Louis Vuitton Cup, Salthouse sailed with Chris Dickson's Tag Heuer Challenge.

He joined Team New Zealand for the unsuccessful 2003 America's Cup defence.

He was Team New Zealand's chase boat driver for the 2013 America's Cup and their on-water operations manager when they won the 2017 America's Cup.
