= Young America (1994 yacht) =

- Other names: Stars & Stripes
- Yacht club: San Diego Yacht Club
- Nation: United States
- Class: International America's Cup Class
- Sail no: USA–36
- Designer(s): Bruce Nelson
- Builder: Eric Goetz Custom Sailboats
- Launched: 1994
- Owner(s): PACT 95

Racing career
- Skippers: Dennis Conner
- America's Cup: 1995 America's Cup
- AC Defender Selection Series: 1995 Citizen Cup

Specifications
- Length: 23.62 m (77.5 ft) (LOA); 17.98 m (59.0 ft) (LWL)
- Beam: 4.57 m (15.0 ft)
- Sail area: 328 m^{2} (3,530 sq ft)

Young America (USA-36) is an American International America's Cup Class yacht that unsuccessfully defended the 1995 America's Cup.

== History ==
Young America was built for the PACT 95 racing syndicate, based in Maine and led by John Marshall, for the 1995 Citizen Cup. The Team Dennis Conner syndicate, sailing Stars & Stripes (USA-34), won the Citizen Cup and the right to defend the America's Cup against the challenge of Team New Zealand, sailing the yacht Black Magic (NZL 32).

Judging that the Young America yacht was the fastest of the regatta, Team Dennis Conner petitioned and was granted the right to use Young America in place of Stars & Stripes, in what proved to be an unsuccessful attempt to defend the America's Cup.

Young America was designed by Bruce Nelson. The original graphics on her hull were created by Roy Lichtenstein and produced by students at RISD.

In 2003, the yacht was donated to the Storm King Art Center in New York. In 2017, Kevin Mahaney, the skipper of the yacht in 1995, sponsored an exhibition at Middlebury College, his alma mater, including the yacht, which was moved from Storm King to Middlebury.
