= Sarah Glaser =

American sailor (born 1961)

Personal information
- Nickname: Pease
- Nationality: American
- Born: November 18, 1961 (age 64) Springfield, Illinois, U.S.
- Height: 5 ft 10 in (179 cm)
- Weight: 150 lb (68 kg)

Sailing career
- Sport: Sailing
- Club: Alamitos Bay Yacht Club; Newport Harbor Yacht Club
- Class(es): 470, A-Catamaran, Formula 16, Tornado, Yngling
Medal record
Sailing
Representing United States
Olympic Games
Silver medal – second place	2000 Sydney	470 class

Sarah "Pease" Glaser (born November 18, 1961) is an American sailor. She won a silver medal in the 470 class at the 2000 Summer Olympics with J. J. Isler. Glaser was born in Springfield, Illinois.
