= 1995 Citizen Cup =

Sailing competition in California

The 1995 Citizen Cup was the defender selection series regatta for the 1995 America's Cup, held in the United States. Three defense syndicates (featuring four IACC yachts) competed over four round robins and a semi-finals series in order earn a berth in the Citizen Cup finals; the winner earned the right to defend the America's Cup against the winner of the Louis Vuitton Cup (challenger selection series regatta).

The 1995 Citizen Cup featured the first all-female crew aboard Mighty Mary of the America^{3} Foundation syndicate, defender of both the Citizen Cup and America's Cup.

== Teams ==
Sail	Yacht	Syndicate	Yacht Club	Nation
USA–23	America³	America^{3} Foundation	San Diego Yacht Club	United States
USA–43	Mighty Mary	America^{3} Foundation	San Diego Yacht Club	United States
USA–34	Stars & Stripes	Team Dennis Conner	San Diego Yacht Club	United States
USA–36	Young America	PACT 95	San Diego Yacht Club	United States

=== America^{3} ===
Bill Koch's 1995 entry was an all women's program. When it was first announced in March 1994 the team attracted over 600 applicants. The team sailed the 1992 boat America^{3} (USA–23) before the arrival of Mighty Mary (USA–43) in time for the fourth round robin. Tactician Dave Dellenbaugh joined the crew for the final round robin. Dawn Riley was captain of the team which included J. J. Isler and Leslie Egnot.

=== Team Dennis Conner ===
Team Dennis Conner sailed Stars & Stripes (USA–34) during the challenger series, which many judges considered to be the slowest of the three 1995 defenders. During the semi-finals USA–34 began taking on water and the crew put on life jackets as they feared the boat might sink. However, the team sailed well and won the Citizen Cup and the right to defend the America's Cup. Dennis Conner led a team that included helmsman Paul Cayard.

=== PACT 95 ===
PACT 95 was based in Maine, founded by Kevin Mahaney and managed by John Marshall. The team developed Young America (USA–36) which, despite being badly damaged twice, finished the Citizen Cup with the best record of 24-12. However, they lost to Team Dennis Conner in the final. Young America was used by Team Dennis Conner as they unsuccessfully attempted to defend the America's Cup.

The crew included Mahaney, Robert Hopkins, John Kostecki, Matt Welling, Andreas Josenhans and Ken Read.

== Round robin ==
One point was awarded for a win in Round Robin one, two for RR2, four for RR3 and 7 for a win in RR4. Young America took two bonus points into the semifinals and Stars & Stripes took one bonus point.

Team name	Won	Lost	RR1 Pts.	RR2 Pts.	RR3 Pts.	RR4 Pts.	Total Pts.	Ranking
Young America	14	6	5	4	14	21	46	1
Stars & Stripes	11	9	3	6	14	7	32	2
America^{3}/Mighty Mary	5	15	1	1	5	14	21	3

== Semi-finals ==
After a compromise was reached by the three syndicates, all three advanced into the finals. Young America took two bonus points into the final and Mighty Mary took one bonus point.

Pos	Team	Pld	W	L	Pts	
1	Young America	10	9	1	11	Advance to finals
2	Mighty Mary	9	4	5	4	Advance to finals
3	Stars & Stripes	10	3	7	4	Advance to finals

Updated to match(es) played on unknown. Source:

== Finals ==
Stars & Stripes overcame a large deficit to Mighty Mary to win the Citizen Cup and with it, the right to represent the United States in the 1995 America's Cup. However, Conner believed that Stars & Stripes stood no chance against the Louis Vuitton Cup winner and challenger, New Zealand's Black Magic. Judging that Young America was the fastest of the regatta, the Conner syndicate petitioned and was granted the right to sail Young America in place of Stars & Stripes in the America's Cup. Black Magic swept Young America in five straight races.

Pos	Team	Pld	W	L	Pts	
1	Stars & Stripes	8	6	2	6	Qualified for America's Cup
2	Mighty Mary	9	4	5	5	
3	Young America	8	3	5	5	

Updated to match(es) played on unknown. Source:
