= Don Cowie =

Don Cowie may refer to:

- Don Cowie (footballer) (born 1983), Scottish footballer
- Don Cowie (sailor) (born 1962), New Zealand Olympic sailor
