= Vladislava Ukraintseva =

Russian sailor

Personal information
- Nationality: Russian
- Born: 20 October 1971 (age 53)

Sport
- Sport: Sailing

Vladislava Ukraintseva (born 20 October 1971) is a Russian sailor. She competed in the women's 470 event at the 2000 Summer Olympics.
