= John Shadden =

American sailor

Personal information
- Full name: John Thomas Shadden
- Born: May 10, 1963 (age 63) Long Beach, California, U.S.
- Height: 5 ft 6 in (167 cm)
- Weight: 134 lb (61 kg)

Sailing career
- Sport: Sailing
- College team: University of Southern California
- Club: Alamitos Bay Yacht Club
- Classes: 470, Laser II
Medal record
Men's sailing
Representing the United States
Olympic Games
| Bronze medal – third place | 1988 Seoul | 470 class |

John Thomas Shadden (born May 10, 1963 in Long Beach, California) is an American former competitive sailor and Olympic bronze medalist.

== Career ==
At the 1988 Summer Olympics, Shadden finished in 3rd place in the 470 class along with his partner Charles McKee.

In the Snipe class, he was third at the 1980 US Nationals with Peter Frazier and was second in the Junior Nationals in 1981.
