= Alexandra Verbeek =

Dutch sailor

Personal information
- Full name: Alexandra Louise Verbeek
- Nationality: Dutch
- Born: 4 June 1974 (age 52) Amstelveen
- Height: 1.83 m (6.0 ft)

Sport

Sailing career
- Class: 470
- Club: Watersport Vereniging Aalsmeer
Competition record
Representing Netherlands
Olympic Games
2000 Sydney	Women's 470
- Updated on 2014-02-11

Alexandra Louise Verbeek (born 4 June 1973, in Amstelveen) is a sailor from the Netherlands, who represented her country at the 1996 Summer Olympics in Savannah. Verbeek took the 13th place as crew in the Women's 470 together with helmsman Carolijn Brouwer.

== Professional career ==
- Event manager: Kumpany (2001–2005)
- Pusher: XpeditionGold (2001–2008)
- Manager Marketing en Sponsoring: Topsport Amsterdam (2005–2008)
- General Manager: Sporttop (2008–2009)
- Owner:AlexAction (2009 – Present)
