= Maria Krahe =

Brazilian sailor

Personal information
- Nationality: Brazilian
- Born: 10 August 1970 (age 55)

Sport
- Sport: Sailing

Maria Krahe (born 10 August 1970) is a Brazilian sailor. She competed in the women's 470 event at the 2000 Summer Olympics. She sailed with Fernanda Oliveira, who she met in 1997 as both sailed at the Clube dos Jangadeiros in Porto Alegre. Outside the sport she worked as a psychologist.
