= Belinda Stowell =

Australian sailor

Personal information
- Born: 28 May 1971 (age 55) Harare, Zimbabwe
Medal record
Women's sailing
Representing Australia
Olympic Games
Gold medal – first place	2000 Sydney	Women's 470

Belinda Josephine Stowell OAM (born 28 May 1971 in Harare, Zimbabwe) is an Australian sailor and Olympic champion. She won a gold medal in the 470 class with Jenny Armstrong at the 2000 Summer Olympics in Sydney.

In 2017, Stowell and Armstrong were inaugural inductees in the Australian Sailing Hall of Fame. She went on into coaching.
