= Jenny Egnot =

American-born New Zealand yachtswoman

Personal information
- Full name: Jenny Marie Egnot
- Nationality: New Zealand
- Born: 4 November 1968 (age 57) Oklahoma City, Oklahoma, U.S.
- Height: 170 cm (5 ft 7 in)
- Relatives: Leslie Egnot (sister)

Sailing career
- Sport: Sailing
- Club: Murrays Bay Sailing Club
- Class: 470

Jenny Marie Egnot (born 4 November 1968 in Oklahoma City, Oklahoma) is a New Zealand yachtswoman.

She competed for New Zealand in sailing at the 2000 Summer Olympics in Sydney, with Melinda Henshaw in the Women's Double Handed Dinghy (470) class.

She is the sister of Leslie Egnot who represented New Zealand, also in the 470 class, at three previous Olympics.
