= Leslie Egnot =

American-born New Zealand yachtswoman

Leslie Egnot ONZM
Personal information
- Full name: Leslie Jean Egnot
- Nationality: New Zealand
- Born: 28 February 1963 (age 63) Greenville, South Carolina, U.S.
- Height: 167 cm (5 ft 5 1/2 in)
- Relatives: Jenny Egnot (sister)

Sailing career
- Sport: Sailing
- Class(es): 470, IACC
Medal record
Women's sailing
Representing New Zealand
Olympic Games
Silver medal – second place	1992 Barcelona	470 class

Leslie Jean Egnot ONZM (born 28 February 1963 in Greenville, South Carolina) is an American-born yachtswoman who competed for New Zealand at two Olympic Games and won a silver medal, with Jan Shearer, at the 1992 Summer Olympics in Barcelona, Spain in the women's 470 class.

Egnot had previously been a reserve for Shearer and Fiona Galloway at the 1988 Summer Olympics in Seoul, and Egnot and Shearer competed again at 1996 Summer Olympics in Atlanta where they finished 16th, hampered by an injury Egnot was carrying at the time.

Egnot, who moved to New Zealand with her family when she was 10, reverted to her American passport in 1995 and became the first woman to helm an America's Cup yacht when she led the all-woman crew of Mighty Mary in the 1995 Citizen Cup, the defender selection series regatta for the 1995 America's Cup.

In the 1996 Queen's Birthday Honours, Egnot was appointed an Officer of the New Zealand Order of Merit, for services to yachting.

Egnot's younger sister Jenny Egnot has also represented New Zealand in yachting at the Olympics, competing in the 470 at the 2000 Summer Olympics in Sydney. Her daughter, Sophie Egnot-Johnson, is an elite New Zealand rower, and her son, Nick Egnot-Johnson, is a sailor who won the World Match Racing Tour in 2022.
