= Jenny Armstrong =

Australian yacht racer (born 1970)

Jenny Armstrong OAM
Personal information
- Full name: Jennifer Margaret Armstrong
- Born: 3 March 1970 (age 56) Dunedin, New Zealand
- Height: 171 cm (5 ft 7 in)
- Weight: 59 kg (130 lb)

Sailing career
- Sport: Sailing
Medal record
Women's sailing
Representing Australia
Olympic Games
Gold medal – first place	2000 Sydney	Women's 470

Jennifer Margaret Armstrong OAM (born 3 March 1970) is an Olympic sailor from New Zealand. After competing for her native country at the 1992 Olympics, she moved to Australia in 1996 and won a historic sailing gold for her adopted country at the 2000 Olympics.

== Early life ==
Armstrong was born in 1970 in Dunedin, New Zealand, to John and Robyn Armstrong. Armstrong attended Otago Girls' High School there.

== Sailing for New Zealand ==
In Dunedin, Armstrong is a member of the Ravensbourne Boating Club. She went to the 1992 Summer Olympics in Barcelona, Spain and competed in the Europe class for New Zealand, coming fourth in that competition. Armstrong is listed as New Zealand Olympian number 592.

== Sailing for Australia ==
Armstrong is married to Erik Stibbe, a Dutch born sailing coach. They moved to Australia in 1996 when he secured a contract to coach Australian Olympic solo dinghy sailors. In Australia she was affiliated with the Middle Harbour Yacht Club in Mosman, New South Wales.

Armstrong attended the 2000 Summer Olympics for Australia in her new home city Sydney and competed in the 470 class with Zimbabwean-born Belinda Stowell. They won Australia's first gold medal in sailing in 28 years.

On 16 January 2001, Armstrong was awarded the Australian Sports Medal. Ten days later on 26 January 2001, she was awarded the Order of Australia medal for service to sport as a gold medallist at the Sydney 2000 Olympic Games.

At the 470 World Championships, Armstrong and Stowell won silver in both 2000 and 2001. Armstrong and Stowell were crowned female Australian Yachtsman of the Year for both the 2000–01 and the 2001–02 seasons.

Armstrong and Stowell again competed for Australia at the 2004 Summer Olympics in the 470 class and in that year, they came 14th. Armstrong retired from international sailing after the 2004 Olympics.

In 2016, Armstrong and her husband joined the Otago Yacht Club.

In 2017, Armstrong and Stowell were inaugural inductees in the Australian Sailing Hall of Fame.
