= Don Cowie (sailor) =

New Zealand sailor (born 1962)

Medal record

Representing New Zealand

Men's sailing

Summer Olympics
Silver medal – second place	1992 Barcelona	Star Class

Don Cowie, born 5 January 1962 in Palmerston North, New Zealand, is a former competitive sailor who won a silver medal at the 1992 Summer Olympics in Barcelona, Spain. Cowie teamed with ex-American Rod Davis in the Star class to finish second to the American crew.

He again sailed with Davis as part of the New Zealand Challenge at the 1992 Louis Vuitton Cup.

Cowie and Davis finished fifth at the 1996 Summer Olympics in Atlanta and were also fifth in the Soling class at Sydney along with 3rd crewman Alan Smith. Cowie was the yachting section team leader for New Zealand at the 2004 Summer Olympics in Athens.

In international keelboat racing Cowie has been in winning teams in the Kenwood Cup (for Japan). Cowie was part of Willi Illbruck's successful Pinta crew, winning the 1993 and 1994 One Ton Cup (for Royal New Zealand Yacht Squadron, New Zealand) and the 1993 Admiral's Cup (for Germany).

Cowie was the sailing coach for Luna Rossa Challenge during the 2000 America's Cup before sailing for OneWorld in the 2003 Louis Vuitton Cup. He then joined Team New Zealand as a trimmer for the 2007 America's Cup.
