= Youth Snipe World Championship =

The Junior Snipe World Championship is held every two years in odd numbered years at a sailing club selected by the Board of Governors of the Snipe Class International Racing Association (SCIRA). The World Championship is formally recognised by World Sailing.

== Trophies ==
Vieri Lasinio Di Castelvero Trophy is the sailing trophy awarded to the winning helm.

== Qualification ==
The event is open to contestants under 22 years old (not having their 22nd birthday during the calendar year the regatta is held) and limited to 10 skippers from any country. In addition to the limit of 10 entries per country, the following skippers have automatic bids:

- Current Junior World Champion
- Junior European Champion
- First Junior from Western Hemisphere & Orient Championship
- One additional skipper from the host country, providing that it does not have among its other representatives the Junior World, Junior European or First Junior at WH&O Championship.

All skippers must be citizens, or bonafide residents for at least one year, of the country they represent.

== Particaption and venue ==
Edition			Hosts			Sailor			Boats				Ref.
No	Day/Month	Year	Host club	City	Country	No.	Nat.	Cont.	Boats			Mix	Ref.
1	29 Aug - 2 Sep	1973	Yacht Club Sanremo	San Remo	Italy				39				
2	7-12 Jul	1975	Gamlakarleby Segelförening	Kokkola	Finland				14				
3		1976			Argentina								
4		1978	Mission Bay Yacht Club	San Diego	United States								
5	7-14 Sep	1980	Club Náutico de Ciudadela	Ciutadella de Menorca	Spain								
6		1982	Northern Yacht Club	North Sydney	Canada				12				
7		1984	Yacht Club Uruguayo	Montevideo	Uruguay								
8		1986	Fraglia della Vela Riva	Riva del Garda	Italy				19				
9	14-19 Nov	1988	St. Petersburg Yacht Club	St. Petersburg	United States		15		25				
10		1990	Club Náutico Los Nietos	Los Nietos	Spain		13		24				
11		1992	Motala Segelsällskap	Motala	Sweden				26				
12		1994		Mikkabi	Japan	48	13	4	24	21	0	3	
13		1996	Club de Regatas Mar Menor	Cartagena	Spain	50	14	4	25	21	0	4	
14		1998	Clube de Campo de São Paulo	São Paulo	Brazil	42	12	3	21	17	0	4	
15		1999	Club de Mar de Almería	Almeria	Spain	44	12	3	22	20	1	1	
16		2001	Mentor Harbor Yachting Club	Mentor	United States	40	11	3	20	18	2	0	
17		2003	Moscow Sailing School	Moscow	Russia	52	15	4	26	18	3	5	
18	12-20 Aug	2005	Iate Clube do Rio de Janeiro	Rio de Janeiro	Brazil	26	8	4	13	12	0	1	
19		2007	Yacht Club Sanremo	Sanremo	Italy	40	12	3	20	14	2	4	
20		2009	San Diego Yacht Club	San Diego	United States	42	11	4	21	19	1	1	
21		2011	Royal Danish Yacht Club & Espergærde Sejlklub	Rungsted	Denmark	38	13	4	19	15	1	3	
22	14-20 Sep	2013	Iate Clube do Rio de Janeiro	Rio de Janeiro	Brazil	54	8	4	27	21	1	5	
23		2015	Circolo della Vela Talamone	Talamone	Italy	72	13	4	36	29	3	4	
24	1-6 Aug	2017	Real Club Náutico de La Coruña	A Coruña	Spain	46	7	4	23	17	3	3	
25		2019	Escola de Vela de Ilhabela "Lars Grael"	Ilhabela	Brazil	30	0	3	15	12	1	2	
N/A		2021	Clube de Vela Atlântico	Matosinhos	Portugal	Delayed due to COVID-19							
26	25-31 Jul	2022	Clube de Vela Atlântico	Matosinhos	Portugal	76	7	4	38	28	4	6	
27	2-7 Jan	2024	Coconut Grove Sailing Club	Miami	United States	92	19	6	46	27	6	13	
28	21-25 Jul	2026	Real Club Marítimo de Melilla	Melilla	Spain	106	13	6	53	36	7	10	

== Winners ==
Year	Skipper/Crew	Country
1973	Kimmo Suortti & Juha Hyttinen	Finland
1975	Heikki Haimakainen & Timo Karlsson	Finland
1976	Torkel Borgstrom & Fernando Asad	Argentina
1978	Torben Grael & Eduardo Mascarenhas	Brazil
1980	Louis Martinez & Andres Longarela	Argentina
1982	Steve Bloemeke & Gregg Morton	United States
1984	Horacio Carabelli & Luis Chiapparo	Uruguay
1986	Horacio Carabelli & Chris Schewe	Uruguay
1988	Kenichi Nakamura & Sinichi Murata	Japan
1990	Cristobal Saubidet & Andres Onis	Argentina
1992	Fernando Garcia-Lago Soler & Francisco G. Fraga	Spain
1994	Luis Calabrese & Jorge Engelhard	Argentina
1996	André Fonseca & Pablo Furlan	Brazil
1997	André Fonseca & Roberto Paradeda	Brazil
1999	Lucas Gomez & Marcos Montanaro	Argentina
2001	Raul de Valenzuela & Jose LaTorre Martinez	Spain
2003	Mikee Anderson-Mitterling & Graham Biehl	United States
2005	Victor Demaison & Mario Tinoco	Brazil
2007	Mario Tinoco do Amaral & Matheus Goncalves	Brazil
2009	Mario Tinoco do Amaral & Matheus Goncalves	Brazil
2011	Alvaro Martinez & Gabriel Mauricio Utrera	Spain
2013	Lucas Mesquita & Douglas Gomm	Brazil
2015	Antonio Lopez Montoya & Gregorio Belmonte Cuenca	Spain
2017	Tiago Brito & Antônio Rosa	Brazil
2019	Gustavo Luis Abdulklech & Leonardo Motta	Brazil
2022	Samuel Beneyto Lancho & Rafael Del Castillo Diaz	Spain
2024	Justin Callahan & Mitchell Callahan	United States
2026	Juan José Fernández Maldonado & Álvaro Rodríguez Sánchez	Spain
