= Sailing at the 2000 Summer Olympics – Women's 470 =

Sailing at the Olympics

Women's Two Person Dinghy (470) at the Games of the XXVII Olympiad
- 470 class dinghy
- Venue: Darling Point Cruising Yacht Club of Australia, Sydney
- Date: First race: 20 September 2000; Last race: 28 September 2000
- Competitors: 19 Boats; 38 Sailors from 19 nations

Medalists
1st place, gold medalist(s)		Jenny Armstrong; Belinda Stowell	Australia
2nd place, silver medalist(s)		J. J. Isler; Sarah Glaser	United States
3rd place, bronze medalist(s)		Ruslana Taran; Olena Pakholchik	Ukraine

These are the results of the women's 470 competition in sailing at the 2000 Summer Olympics.

== Results ==
Results of individual races
Position	Nation	Names	Role	1	2	3	4	5	6	7	8	9	10	11	Total	Net
Gold medal	Australia	Jenny Armstrong; Belinda Stowell	Helm; Crew	1	-11	-18	5	8	7	1	6	3	1	1	62	33
Silver medal	United States	J. J. Isler; Sarah Glaser	Helm; Crew	6	1	-15	3	4	-15	9	10	5	3	6	77	47
Bronze medal	Ukraine	Ruslana Taran; Olena Pakholchyk	Helm; Crew	5	7	3	-13	5	1	10	9	-11	5	3	72	48
4	Israel	Shani Kedmi; Anat Fabrikant	Helm; Crew	7	12	1	-15	3	5	3	-14	9	2	8	79	50
5	Germany	Nicola Birkner; Wibke Bülle	Helm; Crew	8	2	4	6	12	4	OCS (-20)	13	1	4	-15	89	54
6	Spain	Natalia Vía Dufresne; Sandra Azón	Helm; Crew	14	-18	5	2	-19	3	11	2	4	9	5	92	55
7	Italy	Federica Salvà; Emanuela Sossi	Helm; Crew	4	4	9	-16	2	-18	12	8	10	7	4	94	60
8	Japan	Yumiko Shige; Yurie Alicia Kinoshita	Helm; Crew	9	5	10	7	1	-14	8	3	-12	12	11	92	66
9	Sweden	Lena Carlsson; Agneta Engström	Helm; Crew	-18	13	2	10	6	9	14	4	2	11	-19	108	71
10	Denmark	Susanne Ward; Michaela Ward	Helm; Crew	3	10	11	11	-18	-17	4	7	15	8	2	106	71
11	New Zealand	Melinda Henshaw; Jenny Egnot	Helm; Crew	13	3	6	1	7	10	6	-19	OCS (-20)	16	10	111	72
12	Argentina	María Fernanda Sesto; Paula Reinoso	Helm; Crew	10	6	-16	8	-15	8	13	1	7	6	13	103	72
13	Netherlands	Carolijn Brouwer; Alexandra Berbeek	Helm; Crew	11	-16	8	9	10	6	5	RDG (9.3)	-13	10	7	104.3	75.3
14	Greece	Sofia Bekatorou; Emilia Tsoulfa	Helm; Crew	2	8	17	12	9	12	2	5	DSQ (-20)	-18	9	114	76
15	Russia	Anna Basalkina; Vladislava Ukraintseva	Helm; Crew	12	-15	13	4	14	13	-16	12	6	14	14	133	102
16	Norway	Carolina Toll; Jeanette Lunde	Helm; Crew	-17	9	7	-17	17	11	7	17	8	13	16	139	105
17	Slovenia	Janja Orel; Klara Maučec	Helm; Crew	15	-19	12	-19	16	2	15	11	14	15	17	155	117
18	China	Yang Xiaoyan; Li Dongying	Helm; Crew	-19	14	-19	18	11	16	18	18	16	17	12	178	140
19	Brazil	Fernanda Oliveira; Maria Krahe	Helm; Crew	16	17	14	14	13	DSQ (-20)	17	15	OCS (-20)	19	18	183	143

== Notes ==
Points are assigned based on the finishing position in each race (1 for first, 2 for second, etc.). The points are totalled from the top 10 results of the 11 races, with lower totals being better. If a sailor was disqualified or did not complete the race, 26 points are assigned for that race (as there were 25 sailors in this competition).

Scoring abbreviations are defined as follows:

- OCS – On course side of the starting line
- DSQ – Disqualified
- DNF – Did Not Finish
- DNS – Did Not Start
- RDG – Redress Given

== Sources ==
Results and weather take from https://web.archive.org/web/20050825083600/http://www.sailing.org/olympics2000/info2000/
