= USA 76 =

American yacht

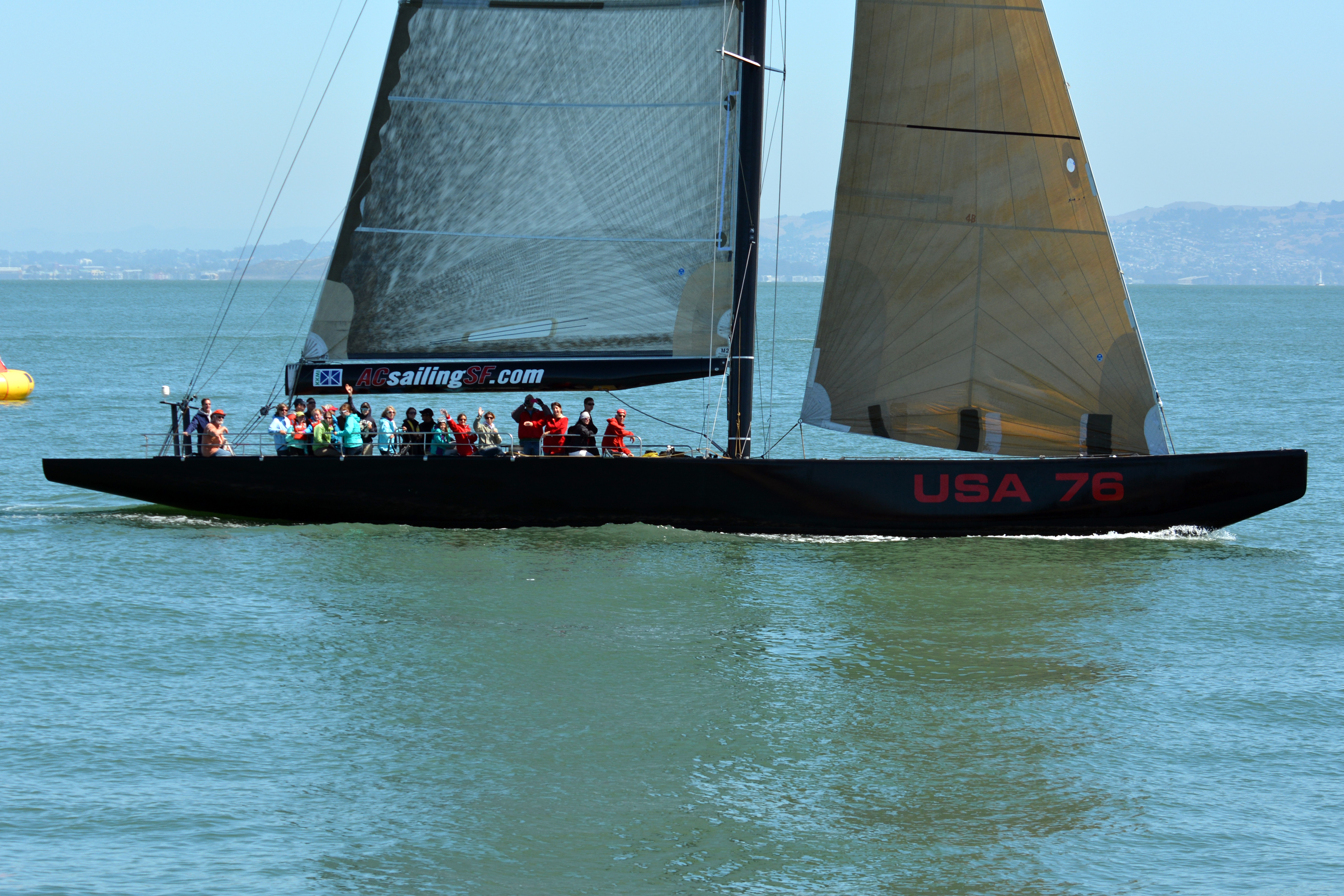
- USA 76 in 2003
- Yacht club: Golden Gate Yacht Club
- Nation: United States
- Class: International America's Cup Class
- Sail no: USA–76
- Owner(s): Oracle BMW Racing

Racing career
- AC Challenger Selection Series: 2003 Louis Vuitton Cup

USA 76 is an American International America's Cup Class yacht. It, and USA 71, were used by the Oracle BMW Racing team in their preparations to challenge for the 2003 America's Cup held in Auckland, New Zealand. Both boats were designed by Bruce Farr.

USA 76 was skippered by Peter Holmberg through the 2003 Louis Vuitton Cup, including the final against the formidable Team Alinghi from Switzerland, who won, and went on to take the America's Cup from Team New Zealand after an impressive performance.

In September 2003, Oracle BMW Racing arranged for a "rematch" to be held against Alinghi in San Francisco. Both pro and owner driver series' scheduled, it was an opportunity to showcase America's Cup sailing on the Bay, and allow the Golden Gate Yacht Club representatives a chance to regain pride after their defeat in Auckland. Again, the competition was tough, especially in the windy confines of San Francisco's city front. The team and USA 76 won both events.

USA 76 is now berthed at Pier 39, and has been in charter operation since June 2011.

== See also ==
- List of IACC yachts
