= Melinda Henshaw =

New Zealand sailor

Melinda Henshaw (born 1 February 1977 in Christchurch, Canterbury, New Zealand) is a New Zealand yachtswoman.

She competed for New Zealand at the 2000 Summer Olympics in Sydney, with Jenny Egnot in the Women's Double Handed Dinghy (470) class. They finished in 11th place.
