= Udo Schütz =

German entrepreneur (born 1937)

Udo Schütz (born 11 January 1937) is a German entrepreneur, who was competing successfully with racing cars in the 1960s, and with yachts in the 1990s.

Schütz owns the company Schütz-Werke in his home town of Selters (Westerwald), which offers also intermediate bulk containers. Thus, „Container“ was the name of his yacht with which he in 1993, together with „Pinta“ and „Rubin XII“, won the Admiral's Cup for Germany. In 2008, Schütz had a new „Container“ built, with modern materials.

== Racing ==
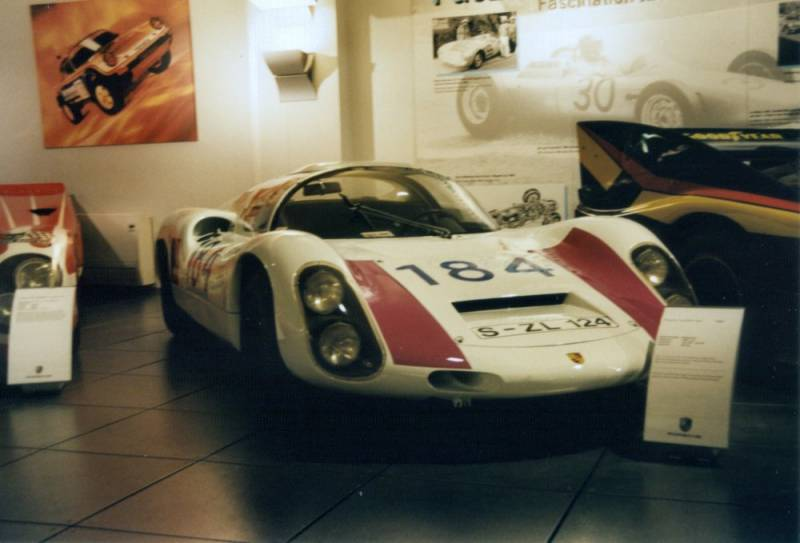
The 1967 Targa Florio Porsche 910 #184 of Umberto Maglioli and Schütz in the Porsche-Museum

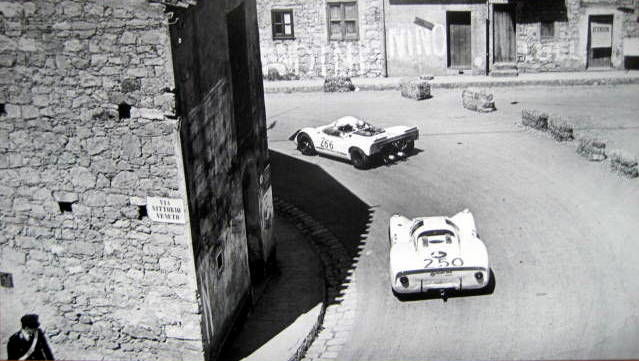
The Porsche 908/02 #266 of Schütz/Mitter in Collesano, on their way to win the 1969 Targa Florio

Schütz's career began in the early 1960s. With Anton Fischhaber and his #72 Porsche 904 he in 1965 won the GT 2.0 class at the 1000 km Nürburgring, finishing 11th overall, and soon was hired by the factory to represent Porsche in motorsport.

The 1967 World Sportscar Championship season began with two DNF in the US, followed by an eighth at Monza, and he did not even start at Spa with his Porsche 906 being entered by a Portuguese team while other factory drivers already had the improved Porsche 910. Rather heavy and tall, dubbed the „Bull from Selters“ (his home town, famous for water), Schütz was not well suited for the low race cars, especially when fitted with closed tops. For other tall drivers like Dan Gurney and Mike Parkes, special bubble roof extensions were added to Ford and Ferrari cars. Driving around Sicily for the 1967 Targa in regular traffic, with the street-legal 910 #184 and without a helmet, Schütz' head did not fit behind the wind screen. Paired with former Targa winner Umberto Maglioli, Schütz suffered yet another DNF, but two weeks later in Germany, Schütz won the 1000 km Nürburgring outright in 1967, paired with Joe Buzzetta on the #17 Porsche 910. Le Mans was yet another DNF, followed by his second world championship win, paired with Gerhard Mitter in a 910 at Mugello, then a Targa-like road race in Italy with eight laps of 66 km each. In Brands Hatch, he shared a 910 with Jochen Rindt, finishing 11th. Zeltweg was another DNF, in a 906 entered by Scuderia Lufthansa, and the penultimate round in Switzerland, the Hill Climb at Ollon-Villars, saw him finishing with a tiny Fiat-Abarth 1000cc at the lower end of the field.

For the 1968 World Sportscar Championship season, Schütz joined the Italian Alfa Romeo Tipo 33 factory team, scoring 5th place at the 24 Hours of Daytona, with the rest of the season being rather disappointing.

Schütz returned to Porsche for the 1969 World Sportscar Championship season and was paired there with Gerhard Mitter, mostly on a Porsche 908/02, fitted with spyder or long tail body. The season began at Daytona with a 24th place following camshaft trouble, and a fifth place at Sebring. In the third round at Brands Hatch, they scored their first podium finish, beaten by two sister cars. The first Italian race, the 1000km Monza, ended with an engine failure, but the second one, in Sicily, with a triumph. They won the Targa Florio on the Porsche 908/2 #266 ahead of three sister cars. For the 1969 1000km Spa, a fast track like Monza and Le Mans, they opted to drive the powerful new Porsche 917 for the first time ever in a race, even though they had qualified it only at eighth, slower than their 908. The flat-12-cylinder engine failed in lap 1 before Schütz could take over from Mitter. At the Ring, Mitter/Schütz qualified third in their 908/02, but due to suspension problems ended up 31st while the other 908s occupied the first five places.

At the 1969 24 Hours of Le Mans, Mitter and Schütz were back in the 908. After 14 hours, in lap 199, Schütz at high speed crashed his #23 Langheck badly after a collision with the #64 sister car driven by Gérard Larrousse, getting ejected from the car when it rolled, surviving without severe injuries. Having already secured the championship, the Porsche System Engineering factory team did not participate in the penultimate round at Watkins Glen in mid July. Only three 908/02 cars were shipped overseas and entered by other teams, and Schütz was not among the drivers.

After his driving partner Gerhard Mitter died two weeks later in practice for the 1969 German Grand Prix, Schütz skipped the ultimate round in 1000 km Zeltweg and retired, sticking to his decision even when Ferrari looked for experienced drivers for their Ferrari 512S multi-car effort in 1970.

In total, he won 50 races, three of them counting towards the World Sportscar Championship. He has won the German Sports car championship in 1966, scored second with and for Porsche in the 1967 World Sportscar Championship season, finished third with Alfa in 1968, and helped Porsche to finally secure the 1969 World Sportscar Championship.
