= KZ1 (yacht) =

1988 America's cup challenge racing yacht

Coordinates: 36.842354°S 174.763471°E

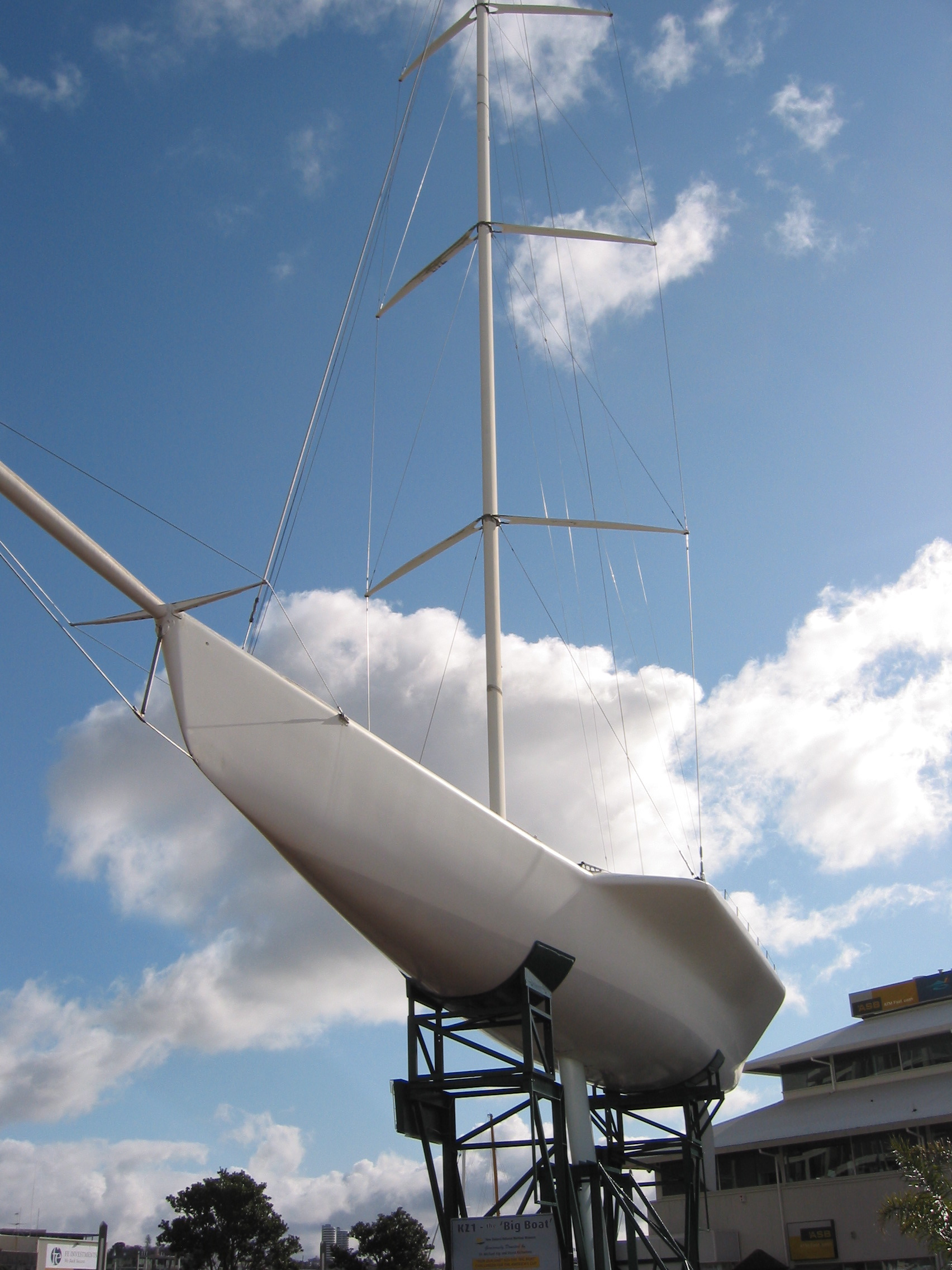
- KZ1 outside the Maritime Museum in Auckland
- Yacht club: Mercury Bay Boating Club
- Nation: New Zealand
- Designer(s): Bruce Farr
- Owner(s): Sir Michael Fay

Racing career
- Skippers: David Barnes
- America's Cup: 1988

Specifications
- Displacement: 39 tons
- Length: 36.57 m (120.0 ft) (LOA); 27.43 m (90.0 ft) (LWL)
- Beam: 8.07 m (26.5 ft)
- Draft: 6.40 m (21.0 ft)
- Sail area: 627 m^{2} (6,750 sq ft) (upwind); 1,600 m^{2} (17,000 sq ft) (downwind)

KZ1, formally called the New Zealand, is a one-off sailing yacht built to challenge for the 1988 America's Cup. She was designed by Bruce Farr and is constructed from a carbon fibre and Kevlar/Nomex sandwich, skippered by David Barnes and crewed by a team of 40 from the Mercury Bay Boating Club in Whitianga, New Zealand.

The unexpected challenge of Michael Fay and KZ 1 almost immediately after the 1987 American victory to San Diego Yacht Club prompted syndicate head Dennis Conner to respond with an unconventional defence. Lacking time and looking to protect the planned international event in 1992, the defenders defended with one of two catamarans built for the challenge Stars & Stripes (US 1), a wing masted catamaran that Conner sailed to easily win the challenge, though most of the battle was later fought in court.

KZ 1 is displayed near the New Zealand Maritime Museum in downtown Auckland.
