= Dennis Conner =

American yachtsman

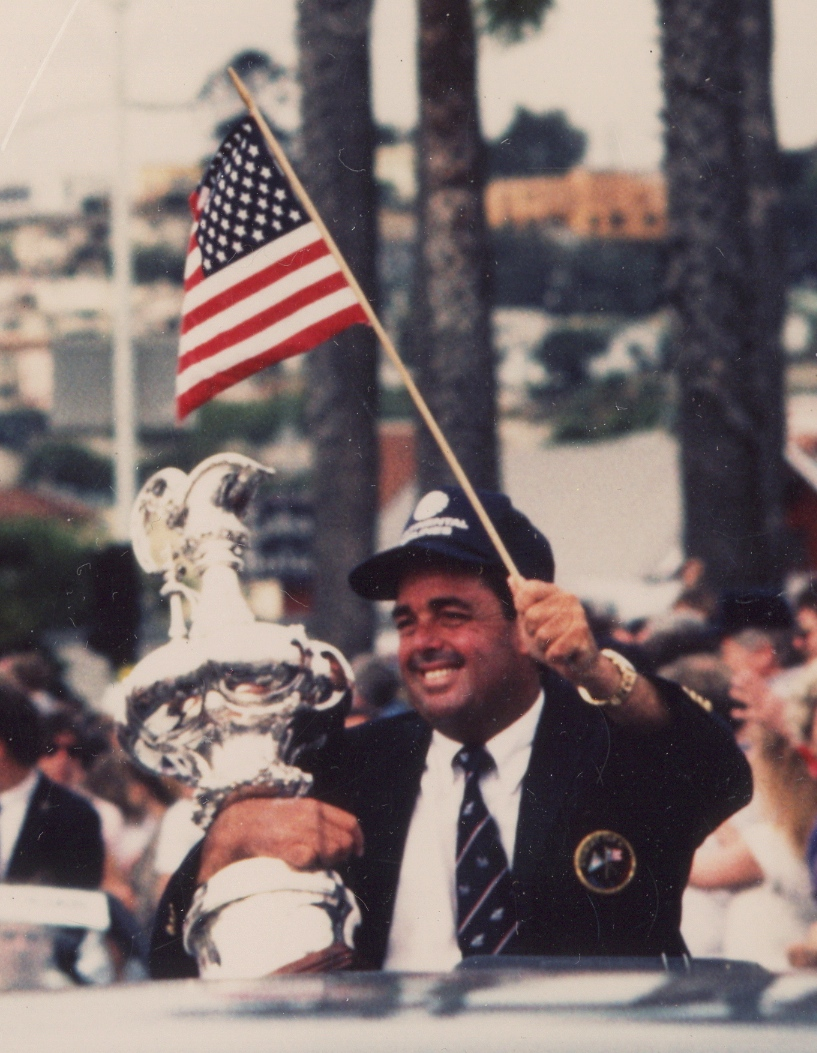

Personal information
- Full name: Dennis Walter Conner
- Nationality: American
- Born: September 16, 1942 (age 84) San Diego, California

Sailing career
- Sport: Sailing
- Classes: Tempest, Star
Medal record
Sailing
Representing United States
Olympic Games
Bronze medal – third place	1976 Montreal	Tempest class
World Championships
Gold medal – first place	1971 Puget Sound	Star class
Gold medal – first place	1977 Kiel	Star class
Silver medal – second place	1978 San Francisco	Star class

Dennis Walter Conner (born September 16, 1942) is an American yachtsman. He was a bronze medalist at the 1976 Olympics and achieved victories in two Star World Championships and three wins in the America's Cup.

== Sailing career ==
Conner was born September 16, 1942, in San Diego. He competed in the 1976 Olympics together with Conn Findlay and took the bronze medal in the Tempest class. Conner also took part in the 1979 Admiral's Cup, as helmsman on the Peterson 45 named Williwaw.

=== America's Cup ===
Conner has won the America's Cup three times, successfully defending the Cup in 1980 and 1988, and winning as the challenger in 1987. His 4–3 loss in 1983 to Australian Alan Bond's wing-keeled challenger Australia II marked the first time the United States had lost the Cup in the 132-year history of the competition, simultaneously ending a run by the New York Yacht Club that began with the first contest. Following the loss Conner formed his own syndicate, the Sail America Foundation, through which he raised funds to mount a challenge on behalf of his hometown San Diego Yacht Club, culminating with winning the Cup back from Australia in 1987. Conner's 1983 loss and the subsequent 1987 victory are the basis of the 1992 American Zoetrope film Wind. The loss was also portrayed in 1986 Australian miniseries The Challenge.

=== The Big Boat Challenge and the beginning of multihulls in America's Cup ===
Representing San Diego Yacht Club, Conner's Sail America Foundation faced another controversial challenger in 1988, backed by New Zealand banker Michael Fay. Fay's team abandoned the 12-meter format that had prevailed since the pre-WW II demise of the massive and fantastically expensive J-sloops, and challenged with a huge and unconventional 90' super-sloop (KZ1). Conner responded with an even more controversial 60' wing-sailed catamaran (US-1) in a surprise defense.

Fay's challenge and legal case based on the Deed foreshadowed the controversial 33rd America's Cup, whose legal wrangling resulted in the contest being decided in enormous multihulls in February 2010, while returning to the pre-war style of exclusive, billionaire backed campaigns of Alinghi and BMW Oracle Racing.

=== Leadership and management ===
Before the 1980s, America's Cup competitors were mostly amateurs who took time off from their regular jobs to compete. Conner insisted on year round training with a new focus on physical fitness and practice. This change in approach led to a return to professional crews in sailing, which had hardly been seen since the 1930s.

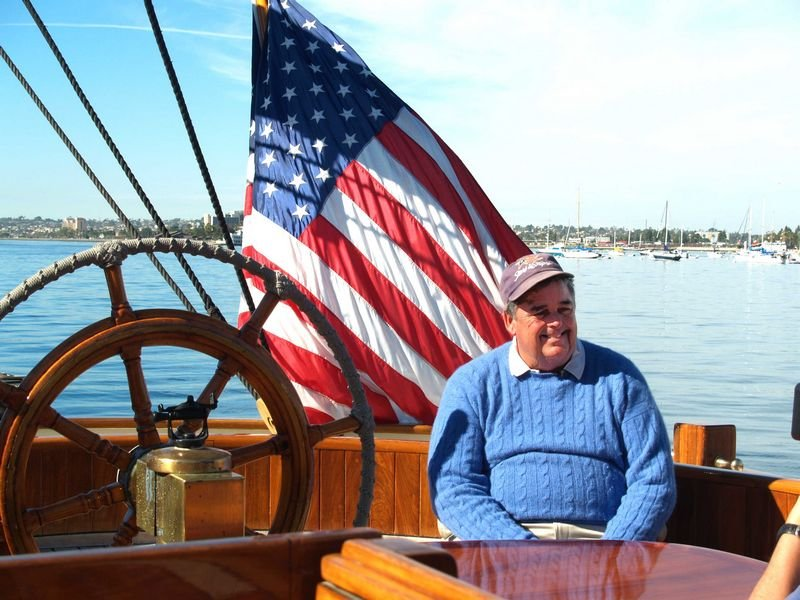
A photo of America's Cup winner Dennis Conner while aboard a replica of the original Cup winner "America" in San Diego in 2010

=== Funding and setbacks ===
Perhaps due to the bad media attention surrounding the 1988 catamaran defense, Conner had insufficient funding to mount a multiple-boat defense in 1992, which also heralded the debut of the IACC yacht. His USA-11 proved no match to Bill Koch's America3 campaign. USA-11 was built as a test bed for design ideas that were to be incorporated into the "racing" boat, nicknamed TDC-2. However, TDC-2 was never built. Its ideas were incorporated into his single-boat campaign for 1995, and the yacht Stars & Stripes USA-34. After almost sinking during the Citizen Cup defender trials, USA-34 went on to a come-from-behind win over Mighty Mary, earning the right to defend the Cup against Team New Zealand's Black Magic, NZL-32. Believing Stars & Stripes was no match against Black Magic, Conner swapped boats for the Cup matches, pitting Young America against Black Magic. But the result was a humiliating defeat for Conner, losing to Team New Zealand 5–0.

Conner again found difficulty securing funding for the 2000 America's Cup in Auckland, New Zealand. As in 1992 and 1995, he mounted a single-boat campaign centered upon Stars & Stripes USA-55. He was eliminated in the quarterfinal repechage by Craig McCaw's OneWorld Challenge.

Conner was a rare non-billionaire fielding a team to compete in the 2003 America's Cup, held in New Zealand, receiving funding of up to US$40 million from his sponsors. His syndicate, Stars & Stripes, suffered a severe setback before departing California, as one of the two Stars & Stripes boats (USA-77) sank when its rudder post failed during training. Despite raising the boat from 55 feet of water and eventually repairing it, the team was unable to recover the valuable testing time lost, ultimately being defeated in the quarterfinals of the Louis Vuitton Cup.

2003 marked Conner's last participation in the America's Cup.

== Yachting accomplishments ==
- 4-time winner, America's Cup, 1974, 1980, 1987 and 1988
- 2-time runner-up, America's Cup, 1983 and 1995
- Inductee, America's Cup Hall of Fame
- Captain, two Whitbread Round-the-World races (On boat Winston in 1993-94 and on boat Toshiba 1997–98.) (see Volvo Ocean Race)
- 28 World Championships
- Three-time winner, U.S. Yachtsman of the Year: 1975, 1980 and 1986
- Seven-time winner, San Diego Yachtsman of the Year
- Olympic Bronze Medal winner, 1976
- 4 Southern Ocean Racing Cups
- 2 Congressional Cups
- 1987 ABC Wide World of Sports Athlete of the Year
- National Sailing Hall of Fame Founding Inductee in 2011
- Maxi yacht racing
- One of only four American sailors inducted into the ISAF Sailing Hall of Fame
- 2-time winner Etchells World Championship (1991 San Francisco, 1994 Newport Beach)

== Honors and activities ==
- Honorary doctorate from Green Mountain College, 1987
- Honorary doctorate from the Medical College of the University of South Carolina, 1987
- America's Greatest Sailor, US Sailing's Greatest American Sailor Tournament
- Commencement speaker, United States Naval Academy
- Cover of Time magazine, February 9, 1987
- Cover of Sports Illustrated with President Ronald Reagan, February 1987
- Artist, sales of artwork in the several millions of dollars
- Motivational speaker
- Member of San Diego Yacht Club, Silvergate Yacht Club, New York Yacht Club, Yacht Club de Monaco
- San Diego Rotary

== Education ==
- Bachelor's degree from San Diego State University

== Publications ==
- No Excuse to Lose, 1987
- Comeback: My Race for the America's Cup, 1987
- Learn to Sail: A Beginner's Guide to the Art, Equipment and Language of Sailing on a Lake or Ocean, 1998
- The America's Cup: The History of Sailings Greatest Competition in the Twentieth Century, 1998
- The Art of Winning, 1990
- Sail Like a Champion, 1992
- America's Cup Cookbook, 1992
- Life's Winning Tips, 1997
