= J. J. Isler =

American sailor (born 1963)

Personal information
- Full name: Jennifer J. Isler
- Born: Jennifer J. Fetter; December 1, 1963 (age 62) La Jolla, California, U.S.
- Height: 5 ft 8 1/2 in (174 cm)

Sailing career
- Sport: Sailing
- College team: Yale University
- Class: 470
Medal record
Women's sailing
Representing the United States
Olympic Games
Silver medal – second place	2000 Sydney	470 class
Bronze medal – third place	1992 Barcelona	470 class
470 World Championships
Gold medal – first place	1991 Brisbane	470 class

Jennifer J. Isler (born December 1, 1963), best known as J. J. Isler and also known by her maiden name of J. J. Fetter, is an American yachtswoman. She is a two-time Olympic medalist and a world sailing champion. She was a starting helmsman in the 1995 America's Cup races. A pioneer in the sport of women's sailing, in 2005 she was the first woman inducted into the Sailing World Hall of Fame and in 2015, she was inducted into the National Sailing Hall of Fame.

She was born into a sailing family, the youngest of three children of Jane and Tom Fetter; he is a former commodore of San Diego Yacht Club. She began sailing Sabots when she was 7 years old. She learned to sail and race in the Juniors program at San Diego Yacht Club, sailing mostly in Sabots. An intense competitor, she disliked the fact that girls and boys were viewed differently in sailing. "The junior regattas were open to everyone, but there was a winner's trophy and a 'first girls' trophy," she recalled recently. "I always wanted just to be first, and hand that other trophy off as 'the first boy trophy'. … I finished second, third and fourth in the Sabot Nationals, but never won, meaning I was always getting that 'first girl' trophy, and I hated it." At the time, many of the West Coast's leading yacht clubs didn't even have facilities for female sailors. She once had to dress for a race in a yacht's club's parking lot.

Her horizons expanded in high school, when she started racing boats other than Sabots, particularly 420s. She was recruited by several colleges, and chose Yale because they promised her she could compete on the varsity team, not just the women's team. At Yale she was the first woman captain of the sailing team. She became only the third female sailor in the history of intercollegiate sailing to be named an All American.

She went on to win medals in the National, European, and World championships in 1987–1988 in the women's 470s. She won the World Championship in 1991. She also won the Rolex International Women's Keelboat Championship in 1986. She has been named the Rolex Yachtswoman of the Year four times.

She won a bronze medal at the 1992 Summer Olympics and a silver medal in the 2000 Summer Olympics, skippering in the women's 470 class.

She was the starting helmsman and tactician for the all-female Mighty Mary USA-34 team for most of the 1995 America's Cup defense trial races, until she was replaced by David Dellenbaugh in a controversial move.

With her then-husband Peter Isler, another champion sailor, she co-wrote the book Sailing for Dummies.
