= 1995 America's Cup =

29th America's Cup yacht race

Coordinates: 32.717038°N 117.228692°W

29th America's Cup
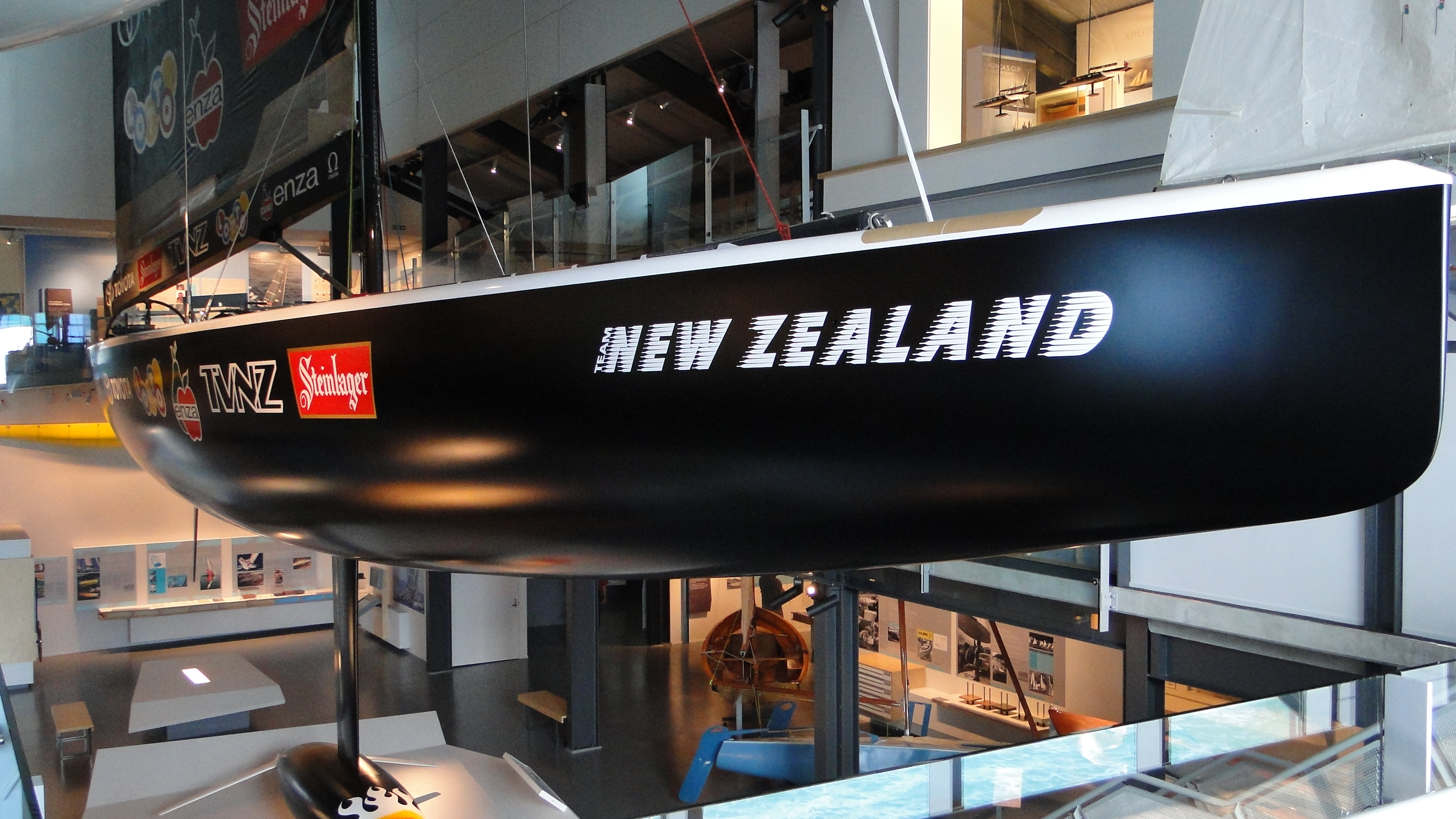
- Black Magic (NZL 32) on display at New Zealand Maritime Museum, Auckland

Defender United States
- Defender club: San Diego Yacht Club
- Yacht: Young America (USA 36)

Challenger New Zealand
- Challenger club: Royal New Zealand Yacht Squadron
- Yacht: Black Magic (NZL 32)

Competition
- Location: San Diego, United States
- Dates: 6–13 May 1995
- Rule: International America's Cup Class
- Winner: Royal New Zealand Yacht Squadron
- Score: 5–0

The 29th America's Cup was contested between the winner of the 1995 Citizen Cup, Team Stars & Stripes, which switched to the yacht Young America (USA 36) for the competition, and the winner of the 1995 Louis Vuitton Cup, Team New Zealand, with the yacht Black Magic (NZL 32). New Zealand swept all five races to take the cup away from the US for only the second time in 144 years. For the first time since 1930, the format changed to a best-of-nine series, which remained through 2007.

== Races ==
Date	Winner	Yacht	Loser	Yacht	Score	Delta
6 May 1995	Black Magic	NZL 32	Young America	USA 36	1-0	2:45
8 May 1995	Black Magic	NZL 32	Young America	USA 36	2-0	4:14
9 May 1995	Black Magic	NZL 32	Young America	USA 36	3-0	1:51
11 May 1995	Black Magic	NZL 32	Young America	USA 36	4-0	3:37
13 May 1995	Black Magic	NZL 32	Young America	USA 36	5-0	1:50

== Crew ==
=== Team New Zealand ===
Role	Name
Skipper / Helmsman	Russell Coutts
Afterguard	Brad Butterworth (Tactician), Tom Schnackenberg (Navigator), Murray Jones, Rick Dodson
Foredeck	Dean Phipps, Joe Allen, Matthew Mason, Jeremy Scantlebury,
Grinders	Craig Monk, Andrew Taylor
Sail Trimmers	Simon Daubney, Robbie Naismith, Warwick Fleury, Peter Blake, Ross Halcrow

=== Team Stars & Stripes ===
Role	Name
Skipper / Helmsman	Dennis Conner
Afterguard	Paul Cayard (Tactician/Helmsman), Jim Brady (Navigator), Tom Whidden
Foredeck	Greg Prussia, Ralf Steitz, T.A. McCann, Josh Belsky, Wally Henry
Grinders	Rock Ferrigno, Jim Nicholas, Paul Larkin, Brad Rodi
Sail Trimmers	Steven Erickson, Bill Trenkle, Jud Smith
