= Admiral's Cup =

International yachting regatta

The Admiral's Cup is an international yachting regatta. For many years it was known as the unofficial world championship of offshore racing.

The Admiral's Cup regatta was started in 1957 and was normally a biennial event (occurring in odd-numbered years) which was competed for between national teams. However the event was not staged in 2001 and was last held in 2003. It was cancelled at short notice in 2005. After this hiatus the Admiral's Cup returned in 2025 which 15 teams entered from around the world.

The 2003 event did not follow the normal format and allowed entries from any yacht club affiliated to a national authority, thus allowing the possibility of several teams per country.

The regatta was based at Cowes on the Isle of Wight off southern England and was organised by the Royal Ocean Racing Club.

== History: 1957–1999 ==
From 1957 to 1999 the cup was competed for between national teams, each having three boats. Initially only Great Britain and the United States took part but, in later years, many other teams also participated. The Fastnet race was part of the Admiral's Cup during this time.

The Australians won for the first time in 1967, the winning boat—Mercedes III—designed by Ted Kaufman and Bob Miller (later Ben Lexcen), who went on to success in the America's Cup.

In 1971 the British Prime Minister, Edward Heath, captained the British Admiral’s Cup Team and also skippered one of the winning boats (Morning Cloud).

The 1993 edition was won by the German yachts „Pinta“, „Rubin XII“ and „Container“, the latter owned by German former race driver Udo Schütz who owns the Schütz-Werke that make Intermediate bulk containers (IBC).

== Recent history ==
The 2003 event, was planned to be based in Dún Laoghaire in Ireland, but this was changed at short notice for reasons that are still unclear. In addition, instead of being a competition between national teams, the event was competed between yacht clubs, each with two boats.

The 2005 event was cancelled only months before the event was to be held, after only two teams had entered.

Although the RORC (Royal Ocean Racing Club) was looking into reviving the event for 2011, this did not happen and it wasn’t until July 2025 that the event was resurrected. The 2025 edition was won by Yacht Club de Monaco, represented by Peter Harrison's TP52 'Jolt 3' and Pierre Casiraghi's Carkeek 40 'Jolt 6'.

== Winners ==
Year	Winner	Top Placed Yacht
1957	United Kingdom	
1959	United Kingdom	
1961	United States	
1963	United Kingdom	Clarion of Wight (GBR)
1965	United Kingdom	
1967	Australia	Mercedes III (AUS)
1969	United States	Red Rooster (USA)
1971	United Kingdom	
1973	Germany	
1975	United Kingdom	
1977	United Kingdom	Imp (USA)
1979	Australia	Police Car (AUS)
1981	United Kingdom	
1983	Germany	
1985	Germany	
1987	New Zealand	Propaganda (NZL)
1989	United Kingdom	Jamarella (GBR)
1991	France	Corum Saphir (FRA)
1993	Germany	
1995	Italy	
1997	United States	
1999	Netherlands	
2001	cancelled	
2003	(Australia) Royal Prince Alfred Yacht Club	Wild Oats (AUS)
2005	cancelled	
2007	cancelled	
2025	Yacht Club de Monaco	Jolt 6 (MON)
