= Stars & Stripes (America's Cup syndicate) =

America's Cup syndicate

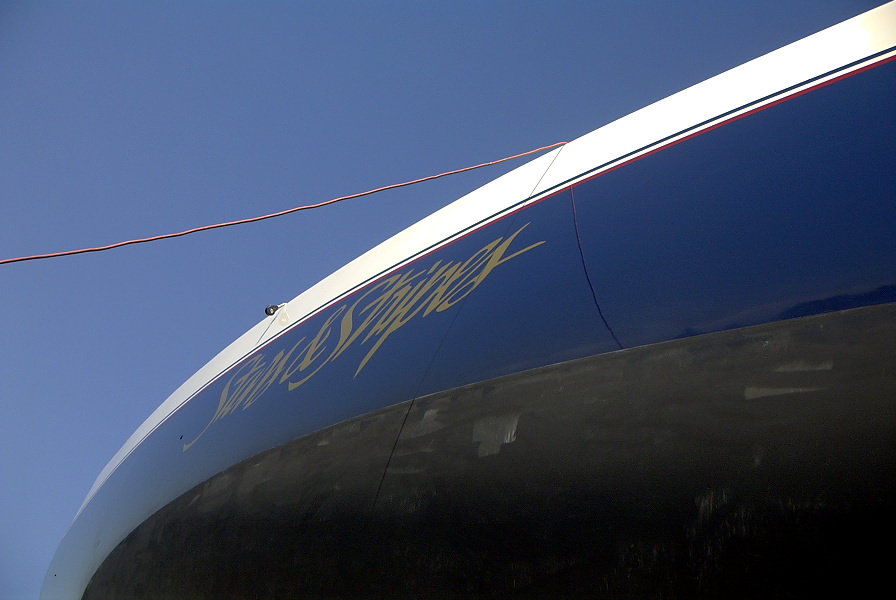
- Stars & Stripes; Team Dennis Conner

Career
- Yacht club: San Diego Yacht Club
- Established: 1987
- Nation: United States
- Team principal(s): Dennis Conner
- Skipper: Dennis Conner
- Notable victories: 1987 America's Cup; 1988 America's Cup; 1987 Louis Vuitton Cup

Yachts
- Sail no.: Boat name
- US–53: Stars & Stripes 83
- US–54: Stars & Stripes 85
- US–56: Stars & Stripes 86
- US–55: Stars & Stripes 87
- US–1: Stars & Stripes 88
- USA–11: Stars & Stripes
- USA–34: Stars & Stripes
- USA–77: Stars & Stripes

Stars & Stripes (Team Dennis Conner) is the name of an America's Cup syndicate operated by Dennis Conner and its racing yachts, which are among the most famous in the world. The name "Stars & Stripes" refers to the nickname often used for the flag of the United States. TDC was registered under the flag of San Diego Yacht Club (SDYC).

== 12-metre class yachts ==
The well funded Sail America Foundation commissioned four 12-metre yachts to support a campaign led by Dennis Conner, representing San Diego Yacht Club, to win back the America's Cup in the 1987 competition in Fremantle, Australia.

- Stars & Stripes 83 (US 53) built in 1985 by Geraghty Marine, designed by Chance/Nelson/Pedrick.
- Stars & Stripes 85 (US 54) built in 1985 by Robert E. Derektor Inc., designed by Chance/Nelson/Pedrick. Proved to be faster than Stars & Stripes 83.
- Stars & Stripes 86 (US 56) built in 1986 by Robert E. Derektor Inc., designed by Chance/Nelson/Pedrick. Designed with a different keel and more sail area.
- Stars & Stripes 87 (US 55) built in 1986 by Robert E. Derektor Inc., designed by Chance/Nelson/Pedrick. Designed and built with the experience gained from the first three designs. Stars & Stripes 87 won the trials to select the challenger and went on to defeat the Australian defender Kookaburra III in a four-race sweep to win the Cup back for the USA.

The movie Wind is loosely based on Dennis Conner's experience, from the 1983 America's Cup loss to his America's Cup win in Perth, and on a number of events that occurred on various competitor boats throughout the match races of the 1987 America's Cup. For artistic reasons, the 12-metre Stars & Stripes 87 was dramatized in the film as Geronimo.

During the 2017 Hurricane Irma, Stars & Stripes 87, the third iteration of the Stars & Stripes sustained major damage in Sint Maarten. A total of five 12 meter yachts were damaged, sunk, or were dismasted. It had previously sunk, in 2002 when the rudder shaft broke while the crew was training.

== Catamaran-hull yachts ==
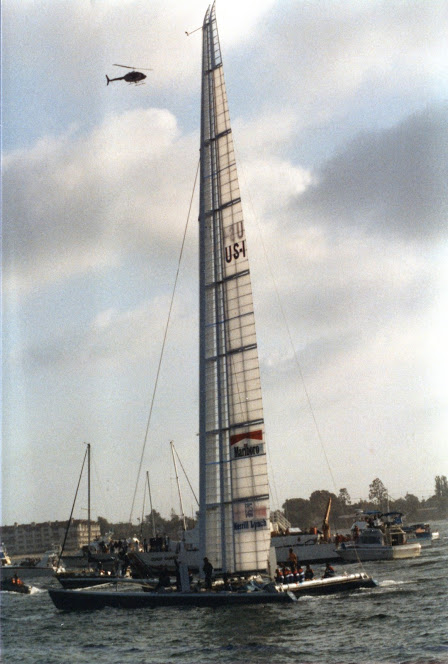
Stars and Stripes after winning the America's Cup and returning to harbor in San Diego, California, September 9, 1988.

The surprise challenge by Sir Michael Fay caught San Diego Yacht Club unprepared. They initially rejected the challenge, but were compelled to respond when Mr. Fay brought the matter before the New York courts. The court's decision was handed down in November 1987, leaving little time to prepare for the 1988 challenge race.

As the challenge used the original Deed of Gift as its basis, the design requirements specified only that she be a single masted yacht no more than 90 feet at the waterline. San Diego Yacht Club and Dennis Conner's syndicate chose to respond with an assuredly faster multi-hull design. Conner enlisted the help of designers Morrelli, Chance & Hubbart & MacLane, and aircraft manufacturer Scaled Composites. Two Stars & Stripes cats were built, one with a conventional soft sail (Stars & Stripes S1), and the second with a wing mast (Stars & Stripes H3) built by Scaled Composites. The wing masted boat proved to have superior performance, and so was used in the defense.

To no one's surprise, Stars & Stripes dominated its match races with KZ 1, the challenger from New Zealand. Following the race the New Zealand team sued and initially won the America's Cup trophy in a court case. The decision was reversed on appeal, and San Diego Yacht Club retained the cup.

After the 1988 America's Cup, the wing masted catamaran was bought by Mexican yachtsman Victor Tapia and currently sails in Mexico. The soft sail yacht was bought by Steve Fossett and used to set speed records in various yacht races. The soft sail yacht suffered a dismasting during a Mackinac race which resulted in her being stored for several years. In 2015, Freddie Mills acquired the vessel and has re-rigged and re-commissioned her as a private racing yacht operating out of Newport, Rhode Island. In October 2017 Stars & Stripes (soft sail) was acquired by Key Lime Sailing Club and Cottages in Key Largo to be used for day charters and racing.

=== 2008 Port Huron to Mackinac race ===
Fossett's Stars & Stripes yacht was entered in the 84th running of the annual Port Huron to Mackinac Boat Race to Mackinac from Port Huron, Michigan, and was favored to win and set a new record time. An experienced Chicago sailor Donald Wilson captained the yacht, chartering it from a Florida businessman for both the Port Huron and Chicago to Mackinac races. The same yacht previously competed in the 74th running of the Port Huron regatta (1998) but was unable to complete the race after the mast broke off near Alpena, Michigan. The yacht was again dismasted mid-race in heavy winds while leading a rival multihull yacht Earth Voyager, which then went on to finish the race in record time.

== International America's Cup Class ==
=== 1992 ===
Conner's 1992 IACC AC yacht, Stars & Stripes USA-11 lost the defender series final, the Citizen Cup, to Bill Koch's America3 USA-23.

=== 1995 ===
Conner's 1995 AC yacht, Stars & Stripes USA-34 won the defender series, the Citizen Cup against Young America USA-36 and Mighty Mary USA-43, by use of tactics. However, it was considered to be the slowest of the three defending yachts, partially due to an old sail inventory, and also a result of neglecting important recommendations from the design team. The defender can choose which boat to use, so Team DC selected Young America, considered the fastest defender, instead of Stars & Stripes in the America's Cup final, losing to Team New Zealand. Dennis Conner did not run a two boat campaign due to cost, so there was no second Stars & Stripes.

=== 2000 ===
Conner again ran a one-boat campaign, entering Stars & Stripes USA-55. Eliminated in the semi-final repechage after an unexpected loss against America True.

=== 2003 ===
Conner's $5 million 2002 entrant, Stars & Stripes USA-77, was sunk on July 23, 2002, when a rudder broke during preparations for the 2002–2003 races to select the challenger for the America's Cup. The boat was raised out of 55 feet (17 m) of water just outside Long Beach Harbor. Conner's luck that year would not improve, as Alinghi and Oracle BMW Racing, two well financed boats, would contest for the spotlight. Conner had a backup and training vessel available, Stars & Stripes USA-66, which he raced until USA-77 could be repaired.

=== 2007 ===
Conner announced that he could not raise sufficient funds for another Cup challenge.
