= International America's Cup Class =

Class of racing yacht that was developed for the America's Cup between 1992 and 2007

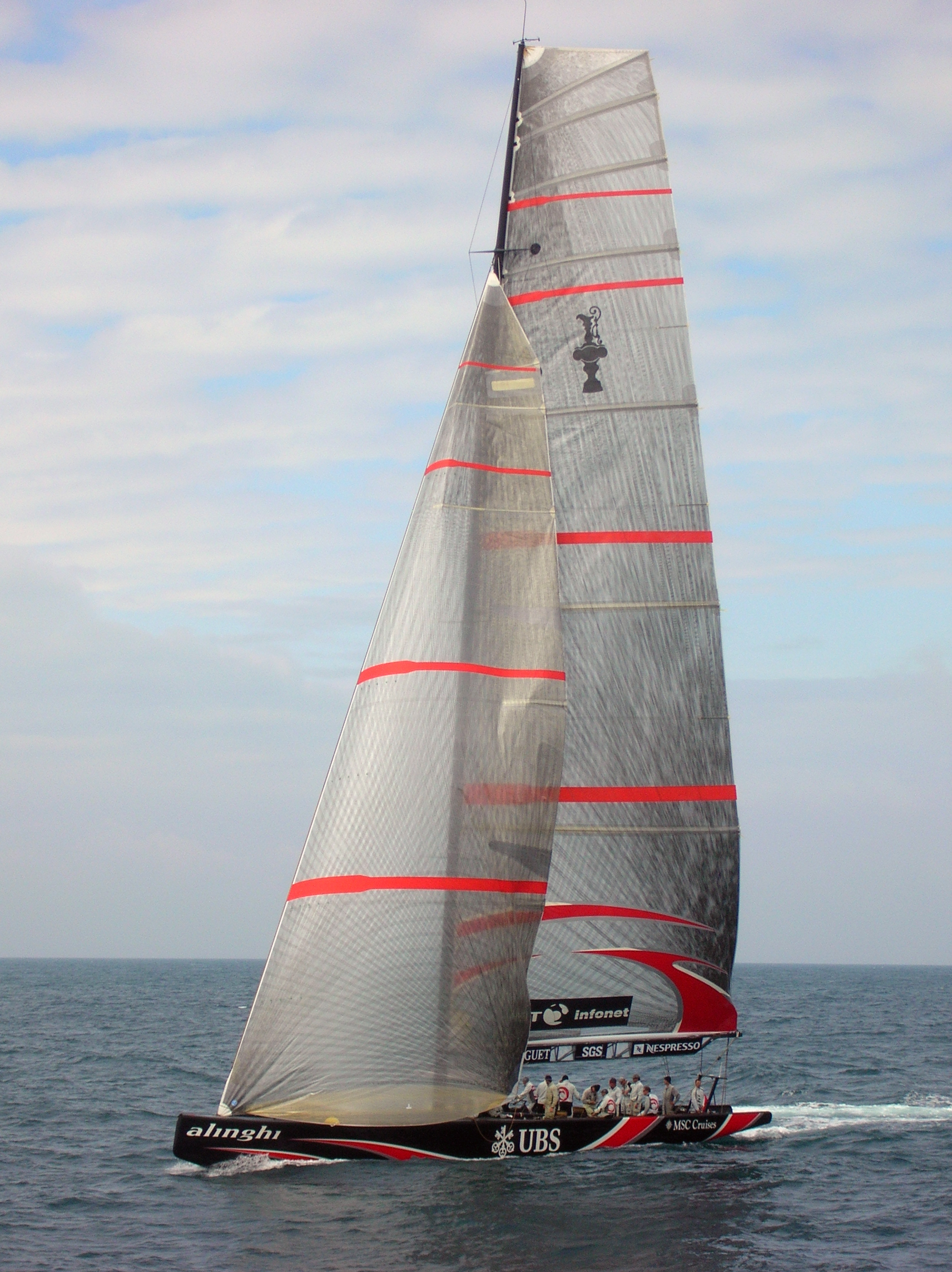
An Alinghi IACC boat, in 2007

The International Americas Cup Class is a class of racing yacht that was developed for the America's Cup between 1992 and 2007. These yachts, while not identical, were all designed to the same formula to offer designers the freedom to experiment whilst keeping the boats sufficiently comparable to race in real time. The class was established for the 1992 America's Cup because of perceived shortcomings of the 12-metre class, which had been used in the America's Cup since 1958.

In addition to the America's Cup, IACC yachts raced in other regattas, including the IACC worlds.

== IACC Sail numbers ==
IACC sail numbers were issued according to the date when the ACM measurement committee decided that the hull had reached a certain stage of completion. The number came in two parts: the flag state (represented by a three letter prefix) and the hull number. The country code changed as the hull was transferred between flag state to flag state. Only one boat had a sail number issued twice as in the case of RUS-62 which was a new boat based on the heavily modified hull of RUS-24 and re-registered as RUS-62.

== IACC Rule ==
Version 5.0 of the International America's Cup Class Rule was issued on December 15, 2003. Copyright is held jointly by the Defender Alinghi and the 'Challenger of Record' BMW Oracle Racing.

Typical parameters of an IACC yacht were:

- length: 25 metres (82 ft)
- weight: 24 tonnes (24 long tons; 26 short tons)
- height of the mast: 35 metres (115 ft)
- weight of the bulb: 19 tonnes (19 long tons; 21 short tons)
- sail surface area: 325 square metres (389 sq yd) upwind, 750 square metres (900 sq yd) downwind
- crew: 17+ "18th man"

== Winning IACC yachts and teams ==
=== America's Cup ===
- 2007 America's Cup Winner - Alinghi SUI-100 (defender), Switzerland
- 2003 America's Cup Winner - Alinghi SUI-64 (challenger), Switzerland
- 2000 America's Cup Winner - Team New Zealand NZL-60 (defender), Team New Zealand, New Zealand
- 1995 America's Cup Winner - Team New Zealand NZL-32 (challenger), New Zealand
- 1992 America's Cup Winner - America³ USA-23 (defender), United States

=== Louis Vuitton Cup ===
- 2007 Louis Vuitton Cup Winner - Emirates Team New Zealand NZL-92, New Zealand
- 2003 Louis Vuitton Cup Winner - Alinghi SUI-64, Switzerland
- 2000 Louis Vuitton Cup Winner - Prada Challenge ITA-45, Italy
- 1995 Louis Vuitton Cup Winner- Team New Zealand NZL-32, New Zealand
- 1992 Louis Vuitton Cup Winner - Il Moro di Venezia ITA-16, Italy

== Umpire Signaling System (“USS”) ==
The 2007 America's Cup saw the introduction of the ‘’Umpire Signaling System’’ (USS) which allowed the Umpires to notify the two boats regarding their position in relation to each other when overtaking and their position relating to a mark of the course when in close proximity of the mark.

On both the defender and the challenger there was a display unit with three LED lights coloured green, amber and white respectively.

- GREEN lamp: ZONE ENTRY. Status ‘On’ indicates that the leading yacht has entered a zone of two or three boat lengths from the mark.
- AMBER lamp: OVERLAP. Status ‘On’ indicates that the bow of the overtaking yacht is overlapping the stern of the leading yacht and there is no restriction on the leeward yacht to steer a direct course for the next mark. The leeward yacht may point higher than the direct course to the next mark causing the windward yacht to either tack or sail higher than needed to the next mark.
- WHITE lamp: RULE 17.1. Status ‘On’ indicates that the depth of the overlap has increased to the point where the yacht to leeward must now steer a proper course to the mark and hence cannot point higher and force the overtaking yacht to either tack or sail a higher course to the next mark.

The rules of racing define what tactics/maneuvers are permissible when a yacht nears a mark and also when a trailing yacht starts to overtake the boat in front. The purpose of the USS is to remove doubt and associated protests caused by competitors having differing opinions of either their positions relative to each other or their distance from marks and then performing tactical maneuvers prohibited by the racing rules.

The system was developed by Pilotfish Networks AB.

== The Formula ==
Formula:

$\frac{L + 1.25 \times \sqrt{S} - 9.8 \times \sqrt[3]{DSP}}{0.686} \leq 24.000 \, metres$

- DSP: displacement in cubic metres;
- L: rated length in metres;
- S: rated sail area in square metres;

== 18th man ==
The International America's Cup Class yachts were crewed by 17 individuals. The boats had to carry what was known as the "18th man", a passenger or the equivalent weight up to 100 kg. This was a highly sought-after position, often filled by a celebrity or a representative from one of the key sponsors to the team.

== The end of the IACC ==
Immediately after the conclusion of the 2007 America's Cup, Brad Butterworth officially announced on behalf of Alinghi and America's Cup Management that a new design of boat would be sailed in the next edition of the America's Cup. The feeling was that the existing IACC rule had evolved as far as was practical and that in the spirit of the America's Cup, a new design challenge was needed.

Alinghi eventually promulgated a new design, called the AC 90. Plans to introduce this class were superseded by Alinghi's loss to BMW Oracle in the 2010 America's Cup and the subsequent creation of the AC72 class of catamarans.

The last IACC yacht completed was hull number 100, the 2007 defender; the last regatta to see IACC boats racing was the Louis Vuitton Trophy in Dubai November 2010.

== See also ==
- Maxi yacht
- List of International America's Cup Class Yachts
- Louis Vuitton Cup
