= San Diego Yacht Club =

Yacht club in San Diego, California

Coordinates: 32.717038°N 117.228692°W

- Burgee
- Short name: SDYC
- Founded: 1886
- Location: 1011 Anchorage Lane, San Diego, CA 92106
- Commodore: Alli Bell
- Website: sdyc.org

The San Diego Yacht Club (SDYC) is a private yacht club in San Diego, California. Founded in 1886, it is one of the oldest in the United States. The club won the America's Cup in 1987, 1988, and 1992.

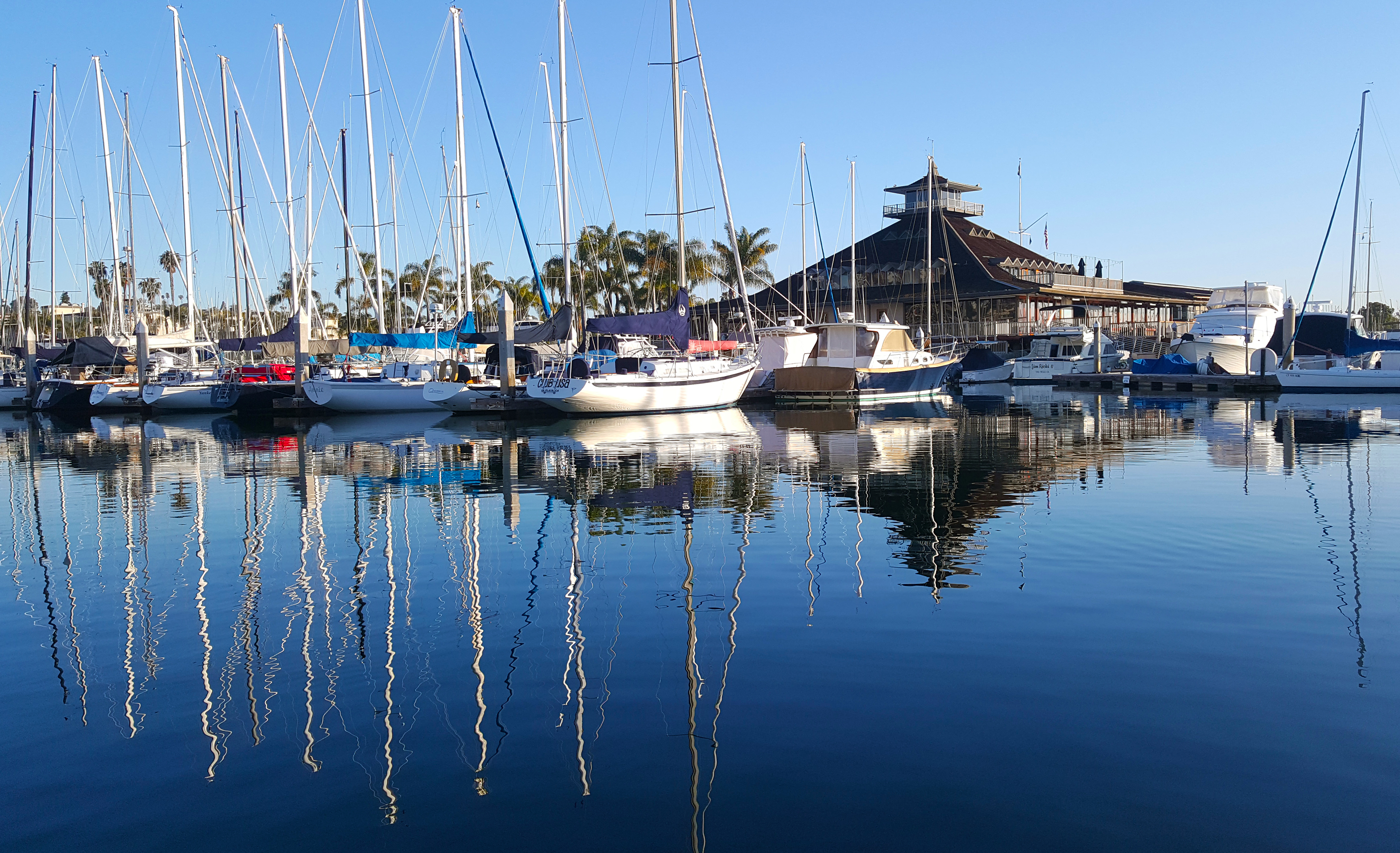
San Diego Yacht Club

== History ==
In June 1886, local boating enthusiasts founded the San Diego Yacht Club. SDYC's first home was in Ballast Point in 1891 in Point Loma.

In 1905, SDYC merged with the Corinthian Yacht Club. In 1910, SDYC purchased Silver Gate, an old Coronado ferry, and towed it to the foot of Hawthorn Street. The club built a pier to Silver Gate, and installed facilities around it, moving on from the original clubhouse on D Street.

In 1914, Silver Gate moved across the bay near the Coronado ferry dock. Silver Gate was sold in 1919 and the club was without a clubhouse for a few years until a new clubhouse was built on Coronado in 1923.

A second "site" was opened in 1924 in Point Loma, as the water was deeper compared to Glorietta Bay in Coronado where the clubhouse was located. The second site was open and operating for people to anchor boats, but the clubhouse itself wasn't moved to Point Loma until 1934.

The clubhouse was then moved from Coronado to Point Loma on January 14, 1934. The clubhouse building was placed on two barges, towed across the channel, and maneuvered into position on pilings during high tide. The move in 1934 was to a different part of Point Loma than where the landing was in 1924.

In 1962, the clubhouse was moved to the back of the club's ground and used as temporary quarters while a new structure was built during 1963. The structure from the 1960s is still in use today, though it has been remodeled a few times.

== Racing ==
The San Diego Yacht Club won the America's Cup in 1987, 1988, and 1992, hosting the event in 1988, 1992, and 1995. In 1987 and 1988, Dennis Conner won the America's Cup on behalf of SDYC. SDYC won the competition a third time in 1992, by Bill Koch on the yacht America.

In addition to America's Cup, ten SDYC members have won the Star World Championships. The San Diego Yacht Club has also had 13 members who represented their country in the Olympics, earning 10 Olympic medals.

== Regattas ==
- The San Diego Yacht Club's signature regatta is the San Diego Yachting Cup, founded in 1972 by Gerry Driscoll. In some years the regatta also includes the United States Ton Cup Championship, a qualifying event for the IOR World Championship.
- The San Diego Yacht Club was the home of the America's Cup from 1988 to 1995 and hosted three America's Cup races during that time.
- The San Diego Yacht Club was the original home of the Sir Thomas Lipton Cup, one of the pre-eminent events in Southern California racing, which is held in the ocean off San Diego every year.
- The San Diego Yacht Club hosted the 2009 Snipe World Championship.

== Notable members ==
Notable members include:

- Dennis Conner
- J. J. Isler
- Roy Disney
- Bill Koch

National Sailing Hall of Fame members include:

- Dennis Conner
- J.J. Isler
- Mark Reynolds
- Lowell North

== See also ==
America's Cup title holders

- New York Yacht Club, defeating the competition's founders, the Royal Yacht Squadron, 1851–1983
- Royal Perth Yacht Club, 1983–1987
- Société Nautique de Genève, 2003–2010
- Golden Gate Yacht Club, 2010–2017
- Royal New Zealand Yacht Squadron; 1995–2003, 2017–present
