= George W. Leland =

- Born: c. 1834; Savannah, Georgia
- Died: March 18, 1880 (aged 45–46)
- Burial place: Lewiston, Maine
- Military career
- Allegiance: United States of America; Union
- Branch: United States Navy; Union Navy
- Rank: Gunner's Mate
- Unit: (United States Navy) USS Lehigh
- Conflicts: American Civil War
- Awards: Medal of Honor

George W. Leland (c. 1834 – March 18, 1880) was a Union Navy sailor in the American Civil War and a recipient of the U.S. military's highest decoration, the Medal of Honor, for helping to free his grounded ship.

Born in about 1834 in Savannah, Georgia, Leland was still living in that city when he joined the Navy. He served during the Civil War as a gunner's mate on the USS Lehigh.

On November 16, 1863, Lehigh was in Charleston Harbor providing support for Union troops on shore when the ship ran aground on a sand bar and came under heavy fire from Fort Moultrie. Despite intense Confederate artillery fire, Leland and fellow sailor Coxswain Thomas Irving rowed a small boat trailing a hawser from Lehigh to another Union ironclad, the USS Nahant. Both times, the cable snapped due to friction and hostile fire. Officers were about to give an "abandon ship" order when three more sailors, Landsman Frank S. Gile, Landsman William Williams, and Seaman Horatio Nelson Young, volunteered to make one more attempt. This last effort was successful and Nahant was able to tow Lehigh off the sandbar to safety. For this action, all five sailors involved in the operation were awarded the Medal of Honor on April 16, 1864.

Leland's official Medal of Honor citation reads:

Serving on board the U.S.S. Lehigh, Charleston Harbor, 16 November 1863, during the hazardous task of freeing the Lehigh, which had grounded, and was under heavy enemy fire from Fort Moultrie. Rowing the small boat which was used in the hazardous task of transferring hawsers from the Lehigh to the Nahant, Leland twice succeeded in making the trip, only to find that each had been in vain when the hawsers were cut by enemy fire and chaffing [sic].

Leland died on March 18, 1880, at age 45 or 46 and was buried in Lewiston, Maine.

== See also ==
- List of American Civil War Medal of Honor recipients: G–L
