= Thomas Irving (Medal of Honor) =

- Born: 1842; England
- Died: Unknown
- Military career
- Allegiance: United States
- Branch: United States Navy
- Rank: Acting master's mate
- Unit: USS Lehigh
- Conflicts: American Civil War
- Awards: Medal of Honor

Thomas Irving (born 1842, date of death unknown) was a Union Navy sailor in the American Civil War and a recipient of the U.S. military's highest decoration, the Medal of Honor, for helping to free his grounded ship.

Born in 1842 in England, Irving immigrated to the United States and was living in New York when he joined the U.S. Navy. He served during the Civil War as a coxswain on the USS Lehigh.

On November 16, 1863, Lehigh was in Charleston Harbor providing support for Union troops on shore when the ship ran aground on a sand bar and came under heavy fire from Fort Moultrie. Despite intense Confederate artillery fire, Irving and fellow sailor Gunner's Mate George W. Leland rowed a small boat trailing a hawser from Lehigh to another Union ironclad, the USS Nahant. Both times, the cable snapped due to friction and hostile fire. Officers were about to give an "abandon ship" order when three more sailors, Landsman Frank S. Gile, Landsman William Williams, and Seaman Horatio Nelson Young, volunteered to make one more attempt. This last effort was successful and Nahant was able to tow Lehigh off the sandbar to safety. For this action, all five sailors involved in the operation were awarded the Medal of Honor on April 16, 1864.

Irving's official Medal of Honor citation reads:

Served on board the U.S.S. Lehigh, Charleston Harbor, 16 November 1863, during the hazardous task of freeing the Lehigh, which had grounded, and was under heavy enemy fire from Fort Moultrie. Rowing the small boat which was used in the hazardous task of transferring hawsers from the Lehigh to the Nahant. Irving twice succeeded in making the trip, while under severe fire from the enemy, only to find that each had been in vain when the hawsers were cut by hostile fire and chaffing [sic].

Irving was promoted to acting master's mate before leaving the Navy in January 1865.
