= Joanna Coles =

British editor (born 1962)

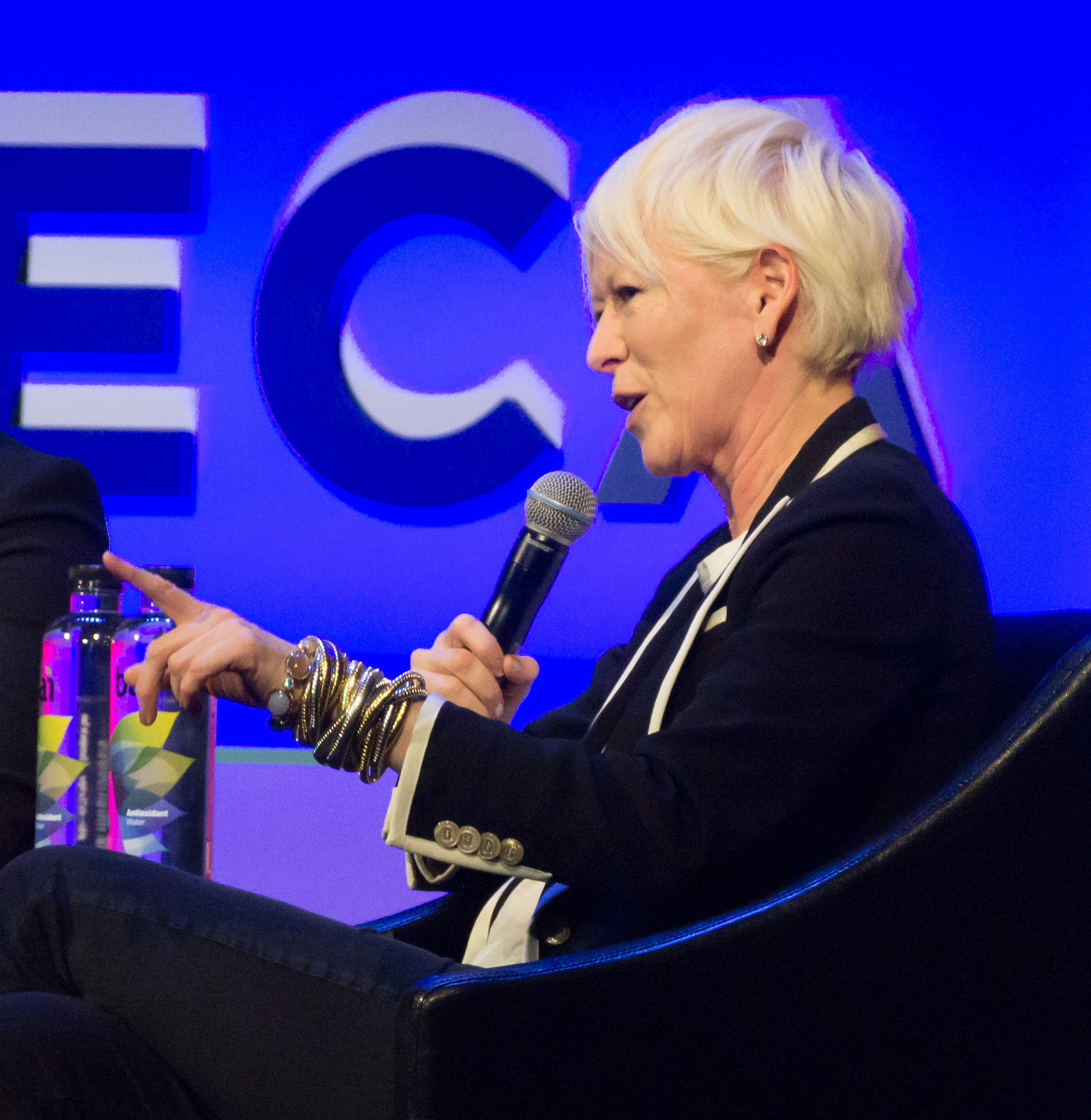
- Time's Up event at the 2018 Tribeca Film Festival
- Born: 20 April 1962 (age 64); Otley, West Yorkshire, England
- Education: University of East Anglia
- Occupations: Former chief content officer, Hearst Magazines
- Notable work: editor-in-chief Marie Claire, editor-in-chief Cosmopolitan, executive producer The Bold Type, author of Love Rules
- Spouse: Peter Godwin (m. 2001; div. 2019)
- Children: 2

Joanna Louise Coles (born 20 April 1962) is the chief creative and content officer for The Daily Beast. She was chief content officer for Hearst Magazines from 2016 to 2018.

Coles started her career at The Spectator and moved to the US in 1997 to become bureau chief of The Guardian, later joining The Times.

In 2006, she joined Hearst as editor-in-chief of Marie Claire magazine, then Cosmopolitan (2012–2016), before becoming the company's chief content officer in 2016.

Coles' foray into television began with the Style Network's Running in Heels, which she co-created and executive produced; she was a mentor on Lifetime's Project Runway: All-Stars and executive produced the E! reality series So Cosmo, in which she also appeared on camera. She is an executive producer for The Bold Type, a scripted series airing on Freeform (formerly known as ABC Family) and Hulu.

She is on the boards of Snap, the parent company of Snapchat; Sonos, an American audio equipment manufacturer; Density Software (density.io), which provides AI-powered occupancy analytics for physical spaces; and the clean beauty company Blue Mistral. She is the author of Love Rules, published by HarperCollins; the book was optioned for TV by ABC Signature and FX. In 2019, she signed a first-look deal with ABC Studios.

== Early life ==
Joanna Coles was born in Otley, West Yorkshire, England, in 1962. Her mother was a medical social worker and her father a teacher. Much of her family still resides in Yorkshire.

In 1972, at the age of 10, Coles had her first article published in the children's section of the Yorkshire Post.

She attended Prince Henry's Grammar School, Otley, and the University of East Anglia, where she graduated with a degree in English and American Literature.

== Career ==
=== Journalism ===
Joanna Coles began her journalism career in 1984 on The Spectator. In 1987, she started work as a reporter for The Daily Telegraph, before moving to the staff at The Guardian in 1989. In 1993, she co-created, wrote and presented BBC Radio 4's "Mediumwave," a live weekly radio show about the media; and wrote and presented Late Media, the TV version on BBC2.

In June 1997, Coles moved to the United States to be The Guardian's New York bureau chief.

Coles was the articles editor of New York Magazine from 2001 to 2004 before becoming executive editor of More.

==== Hearst ====
In 2006, Coles made the move to Hearst to become editor-in-chief of Marie Claire magazine. Under her leadership, the magazine produced its most successful issue in September 2012, while also launching two extensions (Marie Claire@Work, and the Women on Top Awards). She was named Adweek's 2011 Editor of the Year for her work. During this time, Coles began her foray into television with a show called Running in Heels about Marie Claire interns, as well as appearing on Lifetime's Emmy-winning show Project Runway.

Coles was appointed as editor-in-chief of Cosmopolitan magazine in 2012. Though she only had oversight of the print platform, the digital team made Cosmo a leader in the media landscape by partnering with Snapchat to produce daily Cosmo content on the discover platform. She later joined the board of Snap Inc., the parent company of Snapchat. She also brought the brand to television, executive producing the E! reality series So Cosmo. In 2013 she ran a 20-page excerpt of Lean In. Coles turned the magazine away from its "pleasing your man" approach towards women's empowerment.

In 2016, it was announced that Joanna Coles would become Hearst's first chief content officer. She described her responsibility as CCO as “thinking the way we produce content.” In 2018, after 12 years at Hearst, she exited the company after being passed over for the title of president of the magazine division.

=== Television ===
Coles' first TV project launched when she arrived at Hearst as editor-in-chief of Marie Claire, where she co-created and executive produced Running in Heels, a reality show that followed three interns working at the magazine.

So Cosmo was announced in December 2016, with Coles as an executive producer as well as appearing on camera. She followed the personal and professional lives of several staff members of Cosmopolitan.

Continuing the trend of Cosmo-focused shows, in 2017, The Bold Type premiered on Freeform, of which she is an executive producer. The show has been nominated for three Teen Choice Awards, a Satellite Award, an Imagen Award, and a GLAAD Media Award.

In April 2019, Coles signed a two-year first-look deal with ABC Studios. In the announcement, it was said that "under the pact, the former CCO will be developing and executive producing projects for multiple platforms with focus on streaming and cable."

=== Other ventures ===
Coles is an advocate for women in media and the business world. She sits on the board of Women's Entrepreneurs New York City, an initiative to expand female entrepreneurship with a focus on underserved women and communities. Coles hosts an annual holiday lunch for 120 top women in media.

Coles is on the boards of public companies Snap Inc. and Sonos and private companies such as Grover, Density and Blue Mistral.

Coles wrote Love Rules: How To Find a Real Relationship in a Digital World. published by HarperCollins in 2018.

=== Awards ===
Coles has won awards for journalism, including, when she was editor-in-chief of Cosmopolitan, the American Society of Magazine Editors' first-ever National Magazine Award in the Personal Service category, for a guide to contraception. (Note: "Your Guide to Contraception" was published in the September, 2013 issue of Cosmopolitan, and was awarded by the American Society of Magazine Editors on May 1, 2014. New York magazine's The Cut wrote, "Coles took home the magazine's first-ever National Magazine Award, a service journalism prize for "How Not to Get Pregnant." The contraception guide itself was refreshingly honest (pulling out is 'better than nothing,' it advised) — but in some ways the award seemed symbolic, an acknowledgment of the sex bible's broader move into political and reproductive health coverage since Coles took over in 2012. This shift — and its success — is also a triumph for the ladyblog style of female media.") She won a Matrix Award for Women in Communication in 2013, and she was named an Editor of the Year by Adweek.

== Personal life ==
Coles has two sons with Peter Godwin, from whom she is divorced. She resides in New York.
