= Sailing wear =

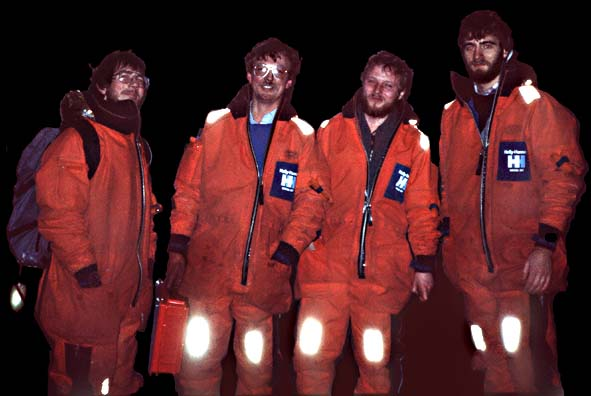
Crew members wearing Helly Hansen suits

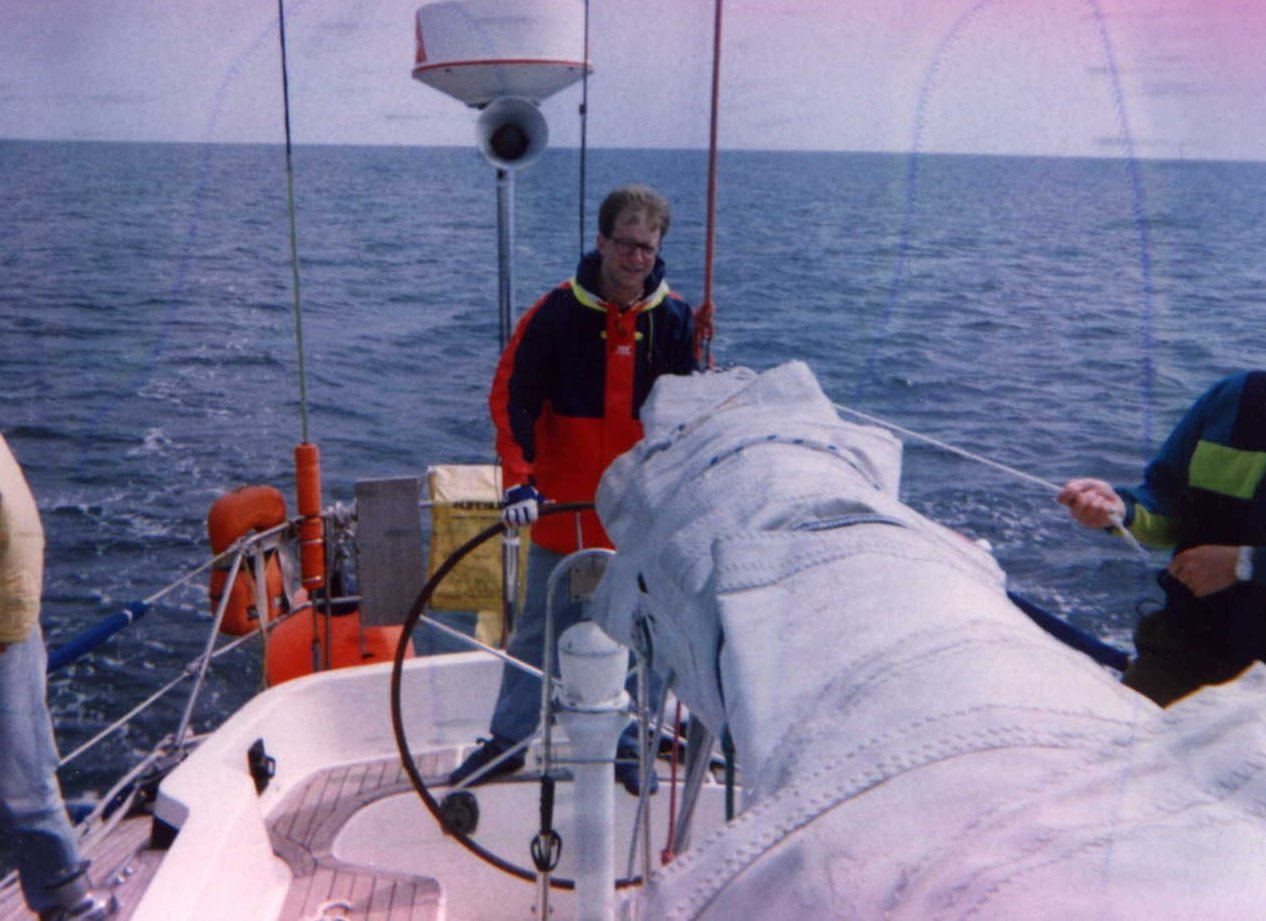
Helly Hansen jacket and gloves

Sailing wear is a type of clothing for sailing. It protects the sailor from water and insulates the body on board a vessel.

There are different types in use, the most premier sailing wear is the offshore set used for the open seas. Usually offshore sailing wear consists of special shoes or Wellington boots, a pant with suspenders, a jacket with a high collar, and other increasingly technical layers worn underneath this outerwear. In addition, specially designed gloves made with synthetic leathers are worn for protection and to increase holding power on sheets.

== Footwear ==
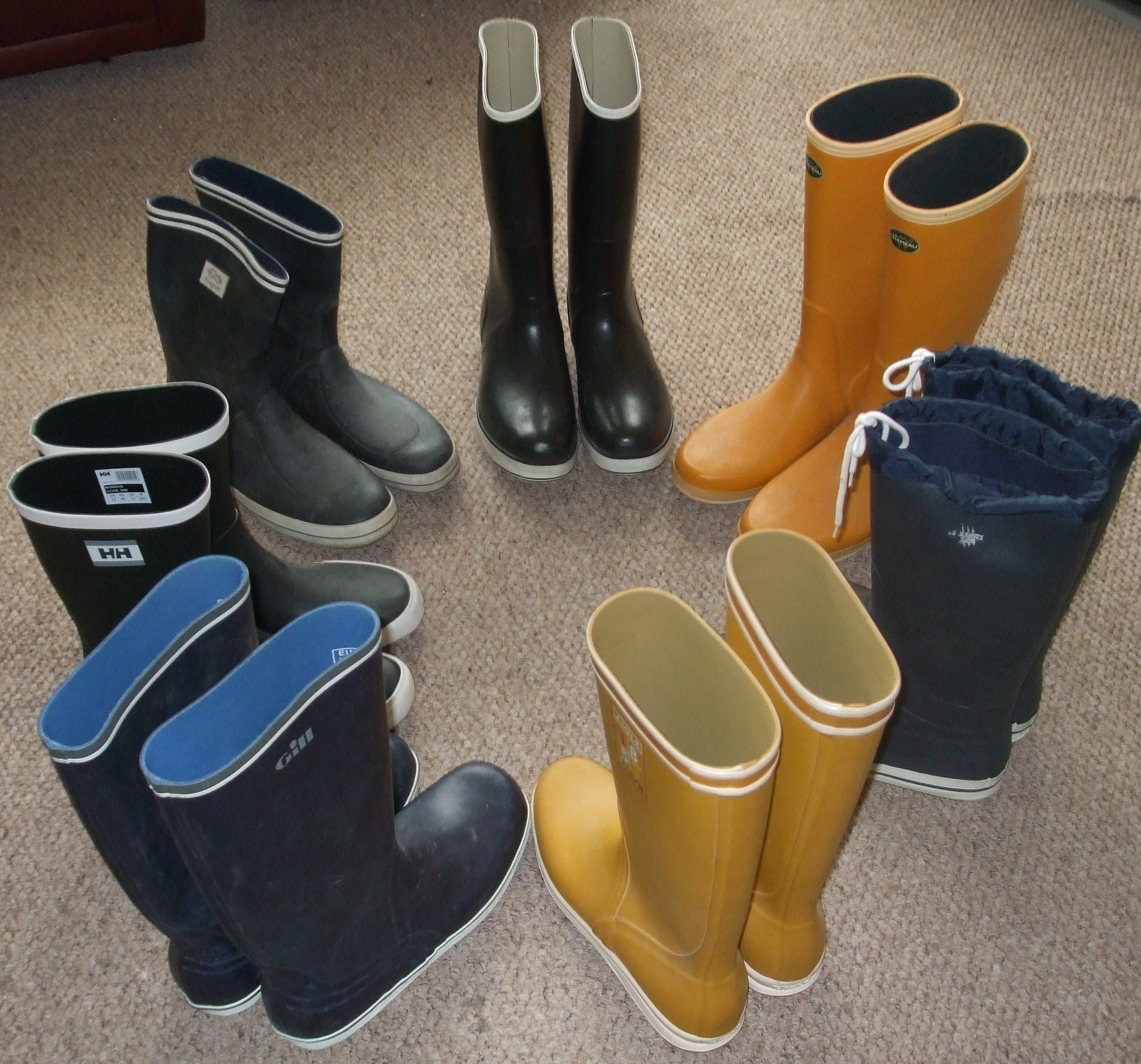
Clockwise from top: Sperry Top-Sider, Le Chameau, Jeantex, Aigle, Gill, Helly-Hansen and Newport short and tall rubber sailing wellingtons.

Marine footwear is extremely important in order to stay safe while sailing. Sailing wet-boots are designed to keep the sailor's feet dry and can be either rubber moulded or more technical. The most common range of fabrics are Gore-Tex and leather. All of the 100% waterproof marine boots have non marking, slip-resistant soles in order to avoid any damage to the vessel's deck. All boots require thermal socks as the rubber does not provide enough warmth. Technical boots have a minimal insulating lining which is why socks are well advised.

== Producers ==
Notable producers are:

- Sperry Top-Sider
- Henri Lloyd
- Helly Hansen
- Musto
- SLAM
- North Sails
- Douglas Gill International
- Rooster Sailing
- Zhik

== See also ==
- Sportswear (activewear)
