= William Williams (Medal of Honor) =

United States Navy sailor

- Civil War era Navy Medal of Honor
- Born: 1840; County Louth, Ireland
- Died: May 5, 1893 (aged 52–53); Philadelphia Naval Asylum, Philadelphia, Pennsylvania
- Burial place: Mount Moriah Cemetery; Philadelphia, Pennsylvania
- Military career
- Allegiance: United States of America; Union
- Branch: United States Navy; Union Navy
- Rank: Landsman
- Unit: USS Lehigh
- Conflicts: American Civil War
- Awards: Medal of Honor

William Williams (1840 – May 5, 1893) was a Union Navy sailor in the American Civil War and a recipient of the U.S. military's highest decoration, the Medal of Honor, for helping to free his grounded ship.

== Military service ==
A native of Ireland born in 1840, Williams immigrated to the U.S. and joined the Navy from Pennsylvania. He served during the Civil War as a landsman on the USS Lehigh. On November 16, 1863, Lehigh was in Charleston Harbor providing support for Union troops on shore when the ship ran aground on a sand bar and came under heavy fire from Fort Moultrie. Several attempts were made to pass a hawser to another Union ironclad, the USS Nahant, but each time the cable snapped due to friction and hostile fire. Officers were about to give an "abandon ship" order when Williams and two other sailors, Landsman Frank S. Gile and Seaman Horatio Nelson Young, volunteered to make one more attempt. Despite intense Confederate artillery fire, the men rowed a small boat from Lehigh to Nahant, trailing a line attached to a hawser. This operation successfully completed, Nahant was able to tow Lehigh off the sandbar to safety. For this action, Williams, Gile, and Young were each awarded the Medal of Honor five months later, on April 16, 1864. Two sailors involved in the earlier attempts to save Lehigh, Coxswain Thomas Irving and Gunner's Mate George W. Leland, also received the medal at the same time.

== Burial ==
Williams in buried in the Mount Moriah Naval Asylum Plot in Philadelphia.

== Medal of Honor citation ==
Rank and organization: Landsman, U.S. Navy. Accredited to: Pennsylvania. G.O. No.: 32, 16 April 1864.

Williams' official Medal of Honor citation reads:

On board the U.S.S. Lehigh, Charleston Harbor, 16 November 1863, during the hazardous task of freeing the Lehigh, which had been grounded, and was under heavy enemy fire from Fort Moultrie. After several previous attempts had been made, Williams succeeded in passing in a small boat from the Lehigh to the Nahant with a line bent on a hawser. This courageous action while under severe enemy fire enabled the Lehigh to be freed from her helpless position.
