= Pangs (band) =

Electropunk group

PANGS are an electropunk group formed in 2015 in Nashville.

== Background ==
PANGS (formerly NUDITY) was begun as a recording project in early 2015 by members Lindsay and Nick Bennett and Will Reiss. Their first release in June 2015, "Already Dead" b/w a cover of Wreckless Eric's "Whole Wide World" earned praise in NME (25 July 2015) where they were named Buzz Band of the Week. Releasing subsequent singles and performing throughout 2015 and 2016 resulted in interviews and reviews by DIY and Impose Magazine.

PANGS' song "RUBICON" appears in "The Friend Connection" episode of MTV series Awkward.

In February 2017 PANGS provided the main theme song, "ARMS CTRL," for the E! network's tv series So Cosmo.

In April 2017 PANGS guitarist and producer, Nick Bennett, began touring with Neil Diamond as guitarist for Diamond's 50th Anniversary World Tour.

== Discography ==
- "Already Dead"/"Whole Wide World" (2015) - self-released digital single
- "Audio/Visual" (2016) - self-released digital single
- "Rubicon" (2016) - self-released digital single
- "Killing Kind" (2016) - self-released digital single
- "Busy Signals" (2016) - self-released digital single
- "Cannonball" (2016) - self-released digital single
- "Supernatty" (2016) - self-released digital single
- "Do Better" (2016) - self-released digital single
- "Arms Ctrl" (2017) - self-released digital single
- "Next to Me" (2017) - self-released digital single
- "Vanishing Point EP" (2017) - self-released digital ep
