= So Cosmo =

- Genre: Reality television
- Starring: Joanna Coles; Leah Wyar; Steven Brown; Tiffany Reid; Diandra Barnwell; Evan Betts; James DeMolet; Adam Mansuroglo; Matthew Hussey
- Opening theme: "ARMS CTRL" by PANGS
- Country of origin: United States
- Original language: English
- No. of seasons: 1
- No. of episodes: 8

Production
- Executive producers: Gil Goldschein; Jeff Jenkins; Farnaz Farjam; Rob Bagshaw; Melissa Bidwell; Joanna Coles; Holly Whidden
- Production location: New York City
- Running time: 42 minutes
- Production company: Bunim/Murray Productions

Original release
- Network: E!
- Release: February 8 – March 29, 2017

So Cosmo is an American reality television series that premiered on February 8, 2017, on the E! cable network. The show follows the personal and professional lives of several young people working for Cosmopolitan, an American magazine for women.

== Production ==
The series was announced on December 13, 2016.

The cast list was announced on February 3, 2017.

On August 19, 2017, a fan asked cast member Evan Betts on Instagram if the show would be returning, he replied "unfortunately not, but that's okay".

== Cast ==
Joanna Coles - Chief Content Officer

Leah Wyar - Executive beauty director

Steven Brown - Bookings director

Tiffany Reid - Senior fashion editor

Diandra Barnwell - Brand coordinator

Evan Betts - Fitness contributor

James DeMolet - Senior fashion editor

Adam Mansuroglu - Fashion editor

Michele Promaulayko - New editor in chief

Matthew Hussey - Relationship contributor

== Broadcast ==
Internationally, the series premiered in Australia on the local version of E! on February 14, 2017.

The show premiered on February 14, 2017 in New Zealand on the E! Network.

The show premiered in United Kingdom in March 2017.

== Soundtrack ==
The theme song is "ARMS CTRL" performed by PANGS.

== Episodes ==
EPISODE	TITLE	SYNOPSIS	ORIGINAL AIR DATE
1.0	Meet the Cast	Preview special introducing the cast of "So Cosmo."	December 20, 2016
1.1	Vol. 1. No. 1: Fun Fearless Females	Joanna Coles, Editor-in-Chief of Cosmopolitan magazine, prepares to announce major news to the staff while they are in the midst of preparing to shoot Ruby Rose for an upcoming cover. Brand Coordinator, Diandra Barnwell, runs into romantic complications when she is asked to help interview people to be the new Fitness Contributor.	February 8, 2017
1.2	Vol. 1. No. 2: Big New Futures	The staff deals with the shock of Joanna Cole's announcement. Senior Fashion Editor, Tiffany Reid, rubs some coworkers the wrong way during New York Fashion Week. Diandra and the new Fitness Contributor, Evan Betts, raise eyebrows with their office flirtation. Executive Beauty Editor, Leah Wyar, struggles with the future of her career after Joanna Coles's announcement.	February 15, 2017
1.3	Vol. 1. No. 3: Before Heads Roll	Joanna introduces the staff to their new Editor-in-Chief, Michele Promaulayko. Diandra takes extreme measures to prove to the office that there's nothing going on between her and Evan. Diandra and Bookings Director, Steven Brown, clash after Diandra is left over the invite list to a party thrown by fashion designer Philip Plein.	February 22, 2017
1.4	Vol. 1. No. 4: Fun Fearless Money	Tiffany Reid and James Worthington Demolet attend a controversial fashion show in Milan during Fashion Week. Diandra puts her issues with Steven aside as she helps with Cosmo's annual "Fun Fearless" conference. Steven and James take a getaway to the Poconos where the grow closer than ever.	March 1, 2017
1.5	Vol. 1. No. 5: Is He Truly Into You?	Michele offers the staff a house in the Hamptons left over from a photo shoot. Tiffany's growing closeness with Evan raises eyebrows in the office. Diandra is forced to confront her feelings for Evan.	March 8, 2017
1.6	Vol. 1. No. 6: #BAHAMADRAMA	The staff's plans for a series of shoots in the Bahamas is threatened by a brewing hurricane. Diandra and Evan find themselves growing closer during a work trip to Miami to scout. Steven gets a surprising suggestion when asked to find a model to join Evan on his upcoming fitness shoot.	March 15, 2017
1.7	Vol. 1. No. 7: Woman Up	Adam struggles to impress Leah and Michele during the "Tips and Sips" shoot. Diandra worries she's becoming the object of office gossip. Tiffany's love life gets complicated.	March 22, 2017
1.8	Vol. 1. No. 8: Cosmo AF	Joanna's plans for more changes at the magazine puts everyone on edge. Leah gets unexpected news. Diandra and Evan's relationship hits the breaking point. Tiffany stains a borrowed skirt.	March 29, 2017
