= Holly Whidden =

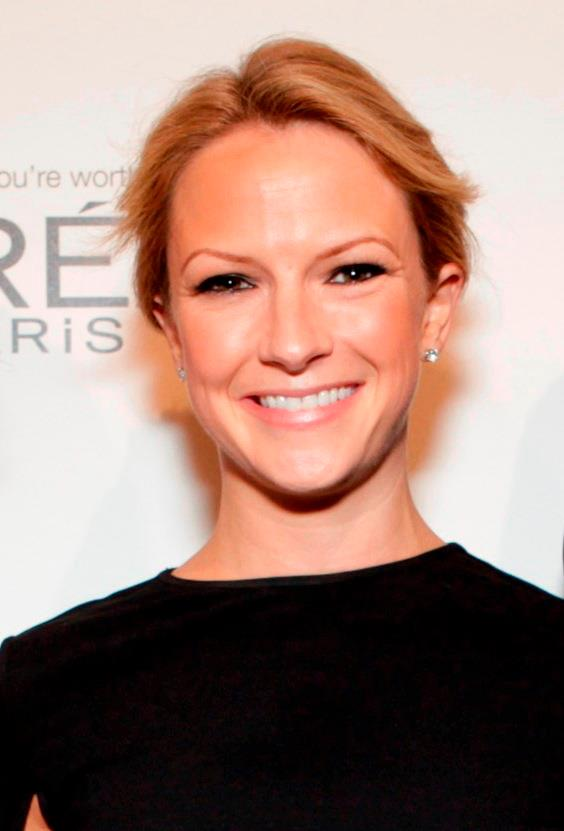
Holly Whidden

Holly Whidden is the co-creator and executive producer of The Bold Type, a scripted show based loosely on her life and time at Cosmopolitan. Whidden also serves as executive producer of A+E Networks American Beauty Star alongside Ashley Graham (model). She served as an executive producer on E! Network's docu-series So Cosmo. She is the daughter of Tom Whidden.

Previously, Whidden was an executive at Hearst Magazines where she oversaw the entertainment division. Hearst is the largest publisher of monthly magazines globally and owns titles including ELLE, Harper's Bazaar, Marie Claire, Esquire magazine, Men's Health, Women's Health (magazine), Cosmopolitan, Town & Country (magazine), Elle Decor, HGTV Magazine, Food Network Magazine, and Oprah Magazine.
