= Frank S. Gile =

- Born: September 15, 1847; Massachusetts
- Died: March 19, 1898 (aged 50); North Andover, Massachusetts
- Burial place: Ridgewood Cemetery, North Andover, Massachusetts
- Military career
- Allegiance: United States
- Branch: United States Navy
- Rank: Landsman
- Unit: (United States Navy) USS Lehigh
- Conflicts: American Civil War
- Awards: Medal of Honor

Frank S. Gile (September 15, 1847 – March 19, 1898) was a Union Navy sailor in the American Civil War and a recipient of the U.S. military's highest decoration, the Medal of Honor, for helping to free his grounded ship.

Born on September 15, 1847, in Massachusetts, Gile was living in North Andover when he joined the Navy. He served during the Civil War as a landsman on the USS Lehigh. On November 16, 1863, Lehigh was in Charleston Harbor providing support for Union troops on shore when the ship ran aground on a sand bar and came under heavy fire from Fort Moultrie. Several attempts were made to pass a hawser to another Union ironclad, the USS Nahant, but each time the cable snapped due to friction and hostile fire. Officers were about to give an "abandon ship" order when Gile and two other sailors, Landsman William Williams and Seaman Horatio Nelson Young, volunteered to make one more attempt. Despite intense Confederate artillery fire, the men rowed a small boat from Lehigh to Nahant, trailing a line attached to a hawser. This operation successfully completed, Nahant was able to tow Lehigh off the sandbar to safety. For this action, Gile, Williams, and Young were each awarded the Medal of Honor five months later, on April 16, 1864. Two sailors involved in the earlier attempts to save Lehigh, Coxswain Thomas Irving and Gunner's Mate George W. Leland, also received the medal at the same time.

Gile's official Medal of Honor citation reads:

On board the U.S.S. Lehigh, Charleston Harbor, 16 November 1863, during the hazardous task of freeing the Lehigh, which had been grounded, and was under heavy enemy fire from Fort Moultrie. After several previous attempts had been made, Gile succeeded in passing in a small boat from the Lehigh to the Nahant with a line bent on a hawser. This courageous action while under severe enemy fire enabled the Lehigh to be freed from her helpless position.

Gile served on three other ships before leaving the Navy. On October 20, 1864 he joined the 20th Maine Infantry Regiment as a substitute and remained in that unit until the close of the war.

A father of seven children, Gile died at age 50 on March 19, 1898, in North Andover. He was buried there in Ridgewood Cemetery. His descendants continued the family tradition of military service.
