= USS Lehigh (1863) =

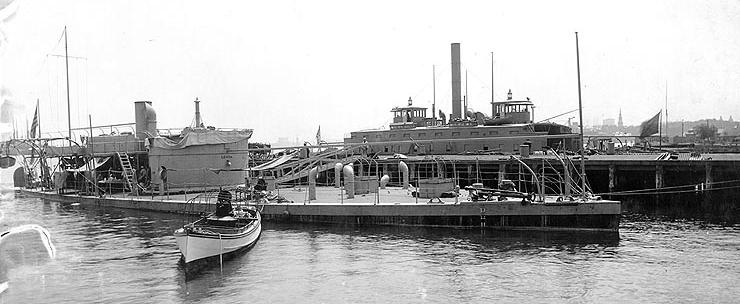
- USS Lehigh during the Spanish–American War

History

United States
- Name: USS Lehigh
- Builder: Reaney, Son & Archbold
- Launched: 17 January 1863
- Commissioned: 15 April 1863
- Decommissioned: 8 September 1898
- Fate: Sold, 14 April 1904

General characteristics
- Class & type: Passaic-class monitor
- Displacement: 1,335 long tons (1,356 t)
- Length: 200 ft (61 m) overall
- Beam: 46 ft (14 m)
- Draft: 11 ft 6 in (3.51 m)
- Propulsion: 2 Martin boilers, 1-shaft Ericsson vibrating lever engine, 320 ihp (235 kW)
- Speed: 7 kn (13 km/h; 8.1 mph)
- Complement: 88
- Armament: 1 × 15 in (381 mm) smoothbore; 1 × 8 in (203 mm) Parrott rifle
- Armor: Iron; Side: 5 – 3 in (12.7 – 7.6 cm); Turret: 11 in (27.9 cm); Pilothouse: 8 in (20.3 cm); Deck: 1 in (2.5 cm)

The first USS Lehigh was a Passaic-class monitor launched 17 January 1863 by Reaney, Son & Archbold, Chester, Pennsylvania, under a subcontract from John Ericsson; and commissioned at Philadelphia Navy Yard 15 April 1863, Commander John Guest in command.

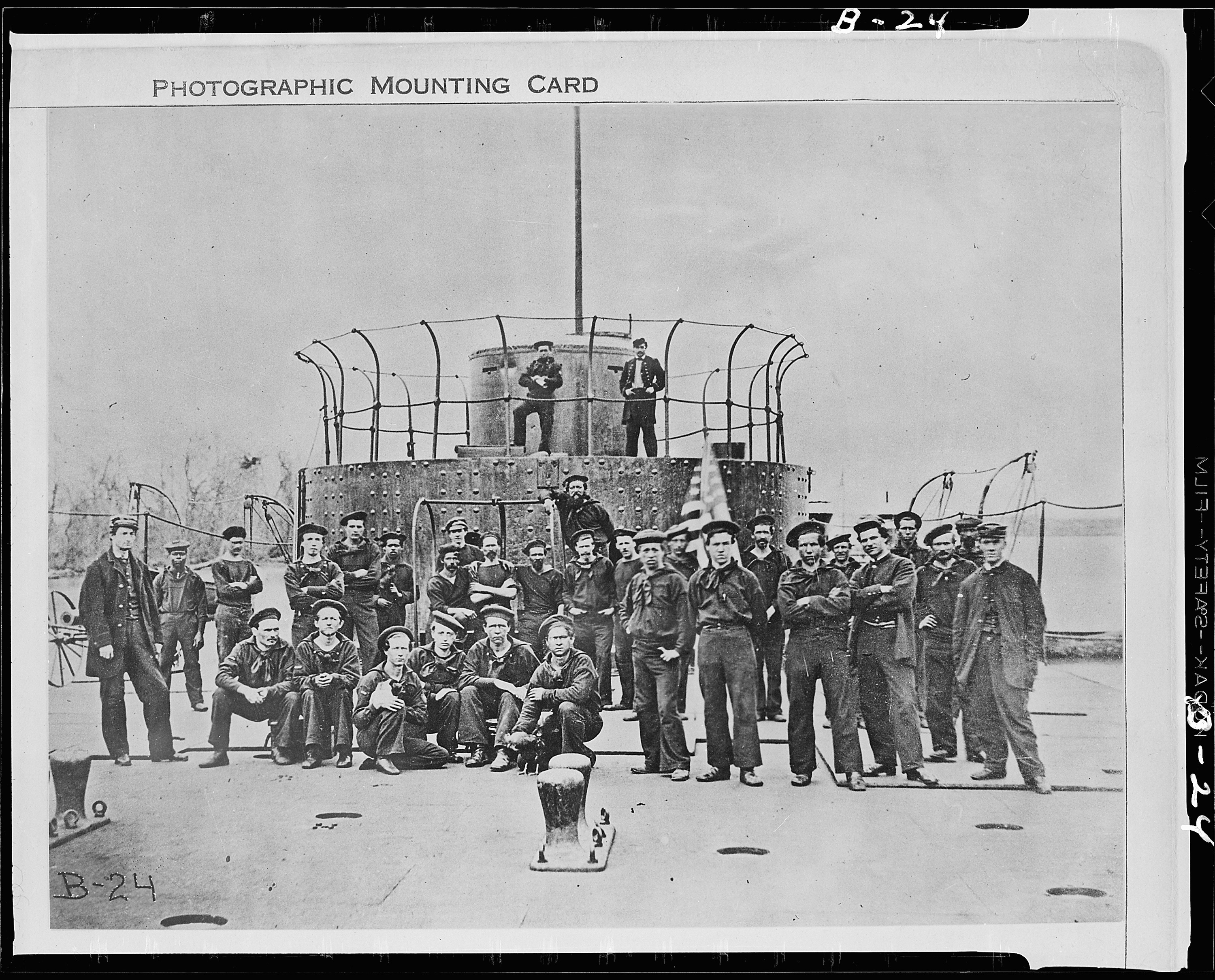
USS "Lehigh" on the James River Virginia, showing dents in the monitor's turret armor made by Confederate cannon shot [US National Archives]

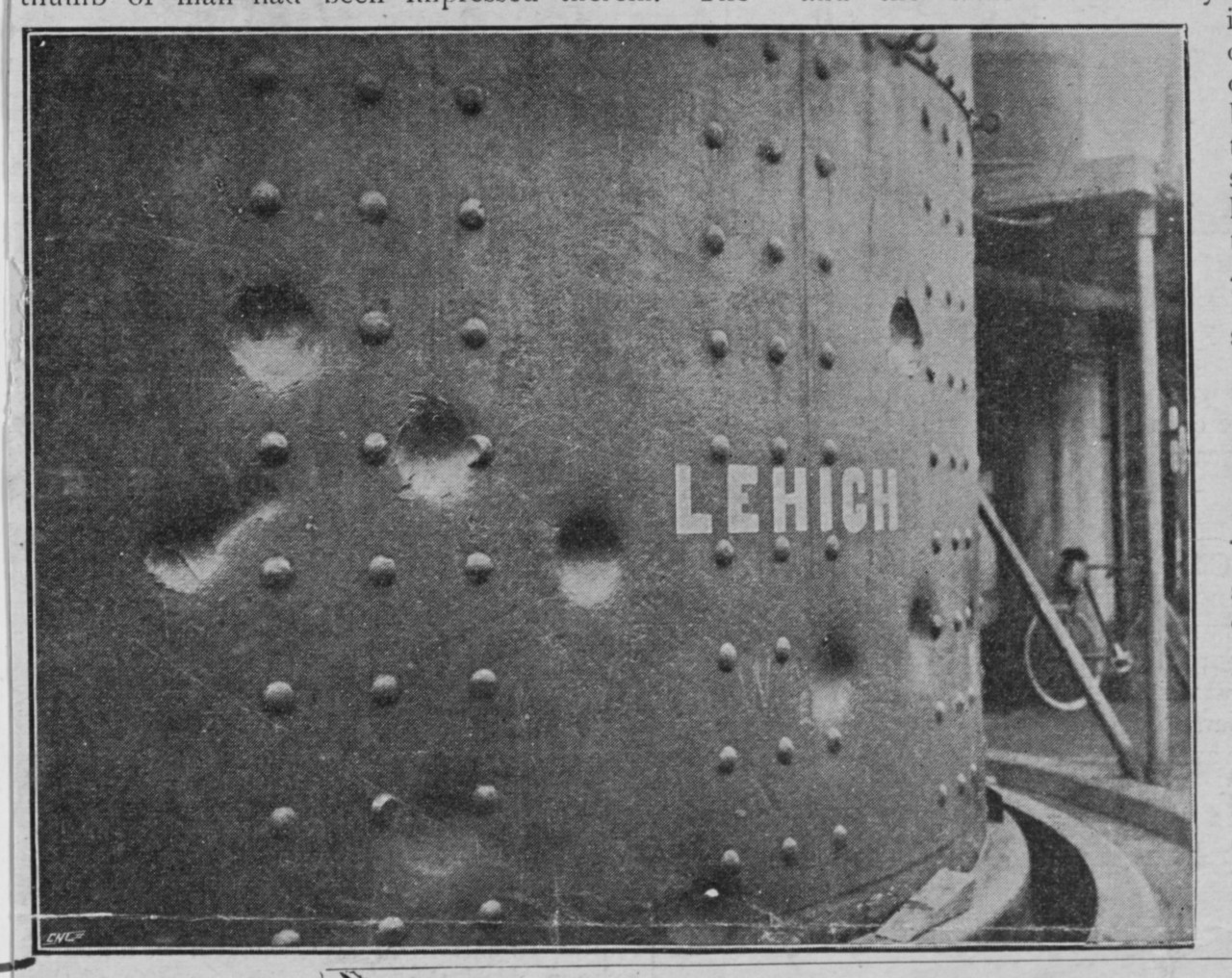
USS Lehigh showing the same dents in the monitor's turret armor

A week later, the new monitor joined the North Atlantic Blockading Squadron at Newport News, Virginia. She performed blockade duty in the Hampton Roads-Virginia Capes area, and on the night of 10 June joined a flotilla under Rear Admiral Samuel Phillips Lee in an expedition up the James River to assist Army troops. Returning to Newport News two days later, she resumed blockade duty until sent back up the James with seven other Union warships to threaten Richmond, Virginia, the Confederate capital. In the wake of the Battle of Gettysburg, the movement was designed to divert Confederate strength from General Robert E. Lee's Army of Northern Virginia which had invaded the North and imperiled Washington, D.C. The expedition caused the South to evacuate Fort Powhatan, leaving no defenses on the James below Chaffin's or Drewry's Bluffs, some 8 miles (13 km) from Richmond. The situation relaxed as the Confederate Army retreated across the Potomac River, and the Union warships dropped down river to Hampton Roads. On the morning of 23 July, Lehigh, towed by Circassian, got underway north and arrived New York City two days later for repairs. In August 1863, commanded by Commander Andrew Bryson, she headed south and joined the South Atlantic Blockading Squadron off Charleston, South Carolina. The monitor took part in the attacks on Fort Sumter of 1 and 2 September, being struck several times; engaged Sullivan's Island 7 September; Fort Moultrie 8 September, receiving 29 hits; covered a landing party attacking Fort Sumter 9 September; and from 27 October to 20 November engaged Fort Sumter almost daily, running aground 16 November off Sullivan's Island under heavy enemy fire. Five of Lehigh's sailors were awarded the Medal of Honor for helping to free the vessel during this incident: Landsman Frank S. Gile, Coxswain Thomas Irving, Gunner's Mate George W. Leland, Landsman William Williams, and Seaman Horatio Nelson Young.

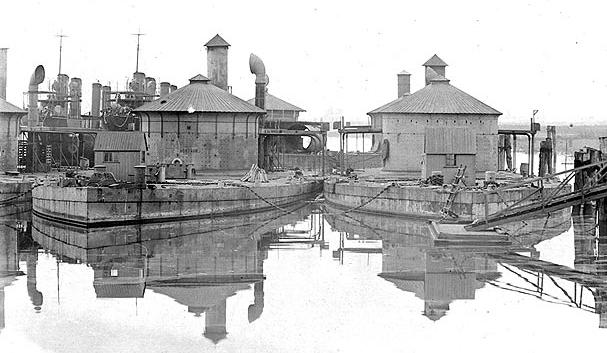
USS Lehigh to the right of USS Montauk in Philadelphia Navy Yard, circa 1902.

After repairs at Port Royal, South Carolina, Lehigh rejoined the fleet off Charleston 13 January 1864, was assigned to picket duty, and during the following year kept up an intermittent fire on various enemy fortifications in Charleston Harbor. In March 1865, Lehigh rejoined the North Atlantic Blockading Squadron and served in the James River through the end of the Civil War. She decommissioned at League Island Navy Yard on 9 June 1865.

Laid up and under repairs at League Island for a decade, Lehigh was recommissioned on 15 December 1875, with Commander George A. Stevens in command, and served as practice and school ship at the U.S. Naval Academy. In April 1876, she was assigned to the North Atlantic Station, and operated in the vicinity of Port Royal.

From 1879 to 1895 Lehigh lay in the James River at City Point and off Richmond. In 1895, she was taken to League Island and repaired, and on 18 April 1898 was recommissioned under Lieutenant R. G. Peek for coastal defense and stationed off the New England coast for the duration of the Spanish–American War. She was decommissioned 8 September 1898, and remained at League Island until sold 14 April 1904.
