= USS Chippewa (1861) =

Gunboat of the United States Navy

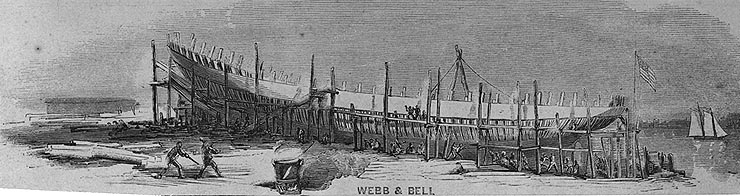
- USS Chippewa under construction

- U.S. steam gun boat Chippewa

History

United States
- Name: USS Chippewa
- Builder: Webb and Bell
- Launched: 14 September 1861
- Commissioned: 13 December 1861
- Decommissioned: 24 June 1865
- Fate: Sold, 30 November 1865

General characteristics
- Class & type: Unadilla-class gunboat
- Displacement: 691 tons
- Tons burthen: 507
- Length: 158 ft (48 m) (waterline)
- Beam: 28 ft (8.5 m)
- Draft: 9 ft 6 in (2.90 m) (max.)
- Depth of hold: 12 ft (3.7 m)
- Propulsion: 2 × 200 IHP 30-in bore by 18 in stroke horizontal back-acting engines; single screw
- Sail plan: Two-masted schooner
- Speed: 10 kn (11.5 mph)
- Complement: 114
- Armament: Original: 1 × 11-in Dahlgren smoothbore; 2 × 24-pdr smoothbore; 2 × 20-pdr Parrott rifle

The third USS Chippewa was a Unadilla-class gunboat which saw service with the United States Navy during the American Civil War.

== Construction and service ==
One of the "Ninety-day gunboats," Chippewa was launched 14 September 1861 by Webb and Bell, New York; outfitted at New York Navy Yard; and commissioned 13 December 1861, Lieutenant Andrew Bryson in command.

Sailing from New York 25 December 1861 Chippewa took station on the blockade between Fort Monroe, Virginia, and Hatteras Inlet, North Carolina, remaining there until 9 August 1862 except for a brief repair period at Baltimore, Maryland 8 March–13 March. During this time she exchanged fire with the enemy at Forts Macon and Caswell and Federal Point Batteries, and assisted in the capture of a blockade runner, the English brig Napier 29 July 1862. Chippewa arrived at the Washington Navy Yard, 10 August 1862.

Returning to Fort Monroe she departed from there 18 October 1862 on a cruise in search of CSS Florida which took her to the Azores; Algeciras and Cádiz, Spain; Gibraltar; Funchal, Madeira; Porto Grande, Africa; Cape Verde Islands; and various ports in the West Indies. Returning to Port Royal, South Carolina, 30 May 1863, she resumed patrols with the South Atlantic Blockading Squadron off the coast of South Carolina and Georgia. She participated in the attacks on Fort Wagner, South Carolina, from 13 to 21 July 1863, and opened fire on enemy pickets up Broad River, on 12 November. After repairs at Philadelphia Navy Yard, she returned to North Carolina to take part in the bombardments and capture of Fort Fisher in December 1864 and January 1865 and Fort Anderson, Cape Fear River, North Carolina, in February 1865.

Chippewa departed Wilmington, North Carolina, 1 March 1865 and steamed up the James River for patrol duty until 15 May, engaging enemy batteries at Dutch Gap Canal on 1 April and 2 April.

== End of service ==
After cruising to Havana, Cuba, between 17 May and 12 June 1865, Chippewa arrived at Boston 17 June where she was decommissioned 24 June 1865, taken to New York 29 June and sold there 30 November 1865.
