= Rooster Sailing =

British sailing wear company

Rooster
- Genre: Clothing manufacturer
- Founded: 1999
- Founder: Steve Cockerill
- Headquarters: Fareham, United Kingdom
- Key people: Luke Morrison (CEO)
- Website: www.roostersailing.com

Rooster Sailing Ltd is a sailing wear company based in England.

== History ==
Rooster was founded in 1999 by Steve Cockerill, a British dinghy sailor in the Graduate, 470, Cadet, Europe, Laser and RS300 classes.
