= Andrew Bryson =

United States Civil War naval officer (1822–1892)

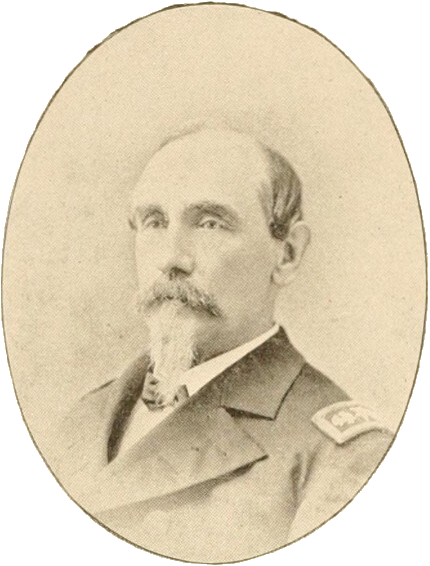
- Born: 25 July 1822; New York City, US
- Died: 7 February 1892 (aged 69); Washington, D.C., US
- Burial place: Green-Wood Cemetery, Brooklyn, New York, US
- Military career
- Allegiance: United States
- Branch: United States Navy
- Service years: 1837–1881 or 1883 (sources vary)
- Rank: Rear Admiral
- Commands: USS Chippewa; USS Lehigh; USS Essex; USS Michigan; Receiving ship, Boston, Massachusetts; USS Brooklyn; Portsmouth Navy Yard; South Atlantic Squadron
- Conflicts: African Slave Trade Patrol; American Civil War; Union blockade

Rear Admiral Andrew Bryson (25 July 1822 – 7 February 1892) was an officer in the United States Navy. He fought in the American Civil War and served as commander of the South Atlantic Squadron.

== Naval career ==
Bryson was born on 25 July 1822 in New York City. He was appointed as a midshipman on 1 or 21 December 1837 (sources vary) and went to sea in the West Indies Squadron from 1838 to 1842, serving first aboard the sailing frigate USS Constellation and then on the sloop-of-war USS Ontario. He attended the Philadelphia Naval School in Philadelphia, Pennsylvania, from 1842 to 1843 and, upon completing his studies, was promoted to passed midshipman on 29 June 1843.

From 1843 to 1845, Bryson served in the Africa Squadron, first aboard the sailing frigate USS Macedonian, then on the sloop-of-war USS Decatur. He next had duty on the Great Lakes aboard the steamer USS Michigan from 1845 to 1849, then served aboard the stores ship USS Erie from 1849 to 1850. Promoted to master on 30 January 1851 and to lieutenant on 30 August 1851, he was aboard the brig USS Bainbridge from 1851 to 1853, operating first in the Brazil Squadron and later in the Africa Squadron, then aboard the receiving ship at Boston, Massachusetts, from 1853 to 1855, the sloop-of-war USS Saratoga in the Home Squadron from 1856 to 1858, and the sloop-of-war USS Preble in the Brazil Squadron from 1858 to 1859. He performed duty at the New York Navy Yard in Brooklyn, New York, in 1861, and was serving there when the American Civil War broke out in April 1861.

Promoted to commander on 16 July 1862, Bryson was commanding officer of the gunboat USS Chippewa on special service from 1862 to 1863. He took command of the monitor USS Lehigh in the South Atlantic Blockading Squadron in 1863, and led her in the reduction of Fort Macon in North Carolina and in all major actions that U.S. Navy ironclad warships fought against the defenses of Charleston, South Carolina, between 22 September 1863 and 5 April 1864, during one of which he suffered a slight wound inflicted by a shell fragment. From 1864 to 1865 he commanded the ironclad river gunboat USS Essex in the Mississippi River Squadron.

After the end of the Civil War, Bryson was promoted to captain on 25 July 1866 and returned to the steamer Michigan on the Great Lakes as her commanding officer from 1866 to 1869. He then commanded the receiving ship at Boston, Massachusetts, from 1869 to 1870, performed duty at the Boston Navy Yard in Charlestown, Massachusetts, in 1871, and commanded the sloop-of-war USS Brooklyn in the European Squadron from 1871 to 1872.

Promoted to commodore on 14 February 1873, Bryson was a member of the Board of Examiners in 1873, then was commandant of the Portsmouth Navy Yard at Kittery, Maine, from 1874 to 1877. He commanded the South Atlantic Squadron from 1879 to 1881 and was promoted to rear admiral on 25 March 1880. He retired from the Navy on either 1 July 1881 or 30 January 1883 (sources vary).

== Personal life ==
Bryson was married to Charlotte Arnold Bryson. They had two daughters and a son, also named Andrew Bryson (2 September 1851 – 1 October 1918). Their eldest daughter married Rear Admiral John Yeatman Taylor of the Navy Medical Corps.

== Death ==
Bryson died at his residence in Washington, D.C., on 7 February 1892. He is buried at Green-Wood Cemetery in Brooklyn, New York.
