= The Bold Type =

2017 American comedy-drama television series

- Genre: Comedy drama
- Created by: Sarah Watson
- Starring: Katie Stevens; Aisha Dee; Meghann Fahy; Sam Page; Matt Ward; Melora Hardin; Stephen Conrad Moore; Nikohl Boosheri
- Composer: Lyle Workman
- Country of origin: United States
- Original language: English
- No. of seasons: 5
- No. of episodes: 52

Production
- Executive producers: Sarah Watson; David Bernad; Joanna Coles; Ruben Fleischer; Holly Whidden; Amanda Lasher; Victor Nelli Jr.; Sandrine Gros d'Aillon; Brian Madden; Matt McGuinness; Wendy Straker Hauser
- Production locations: Toronto, Canada; Montreal, Canada; New York City, United States
- Cinematography: Cynthia Pusheck; Theo van de Sande; John C. Newby; Robert Mattigetz
- Editors: Katherine Skjerping; Ivan Victor; Larry McGinley; Loretta Ball; Stephen Philipson; Robert Lattanzio; Phil McLaughlin; Kimberly Ettinger
- Running time: 41–45 minutes
- Production companies: The District; Sarah Watson Productions; Universal Television

Original release
- Network: Freeform
- Release: June 20, 2017 – June 30, 2021

The Bold Type is an American comedy-drama television series created by Sarah Watson and produced by Universal Television for Freeform. It is inspired by the life and career of former editor-in-chief of Cosmopolitan magazine Joanna Coles, who is executive producer of the series. Filmed in Toronto, Montreal, and New York City, the series chronicles the lives of three millennial women, portrayed by Katie Stevens, Aisha Dee, and Meghann Fahy, all of whom are employed at a fictional global publication called Scarlet in New York City.

While the pilot episode was aired in a special preview on June 20, 2017, the series officially premiered on Freeform on July 11, commencing a first season consisting of 10 episodes. After receiving a two-season renewal, the series premiered its second and third seasons in June 2018 and April 2019, respectively. The fourth season premiered on January 23, 2020, cut from 18 to 16 episodes on shutdown of production due to the COVID-19 pandemic. In January 2021, the series was renewed for a fifth and final season which premiered on May 26, 2021. The final season culminates with an order of six episodes. It is broadcast internationally on various networks and streaming platforms including Amazon Prime Video and Netflix. To date, every season of the series has continued to receive positive reviews from television critics, including those writing for Vanity Fair, Vox, Variety, and The Atlantic.

== Series synopsis ==
The series centers on a trio of millennial women—Jane Sloan (Katie Stevens), Kat Edison (Aisha Dee), and Sutton Brady (Meghann Fahy)—living in New York City. The three best friends work for Scarlet, a fictional global women's magazine, spearheaded by its editor-in-chief, Jacqueline Carlyle (Melora Hardin). The young women navigate their lives in the big city, including their career trajectories and romantic relationships.

Jane begins the series as a new writer for the magazine after working as an assistant, struggling to find her writing voice. Sutton is in a secret romantic relationship with Richard Hunter (Sam Page), a Scarlet board member and attorney for the magazine's publishing firm; she also realizes that she is ready for a change in her career and attains a fashion assistant position for the magazine under department head Oliver Grayson (Stephen Conrad Moore). Secure in her position as Scarlet's social media director, Kat meets photographer Adena El-Amin (Nikohl Boosheri) and starts to explore her sexuality, including the tribulations that said exploration brings.

Season two of The Bold Type follows Jane as she continues to find her journalistic voice in a new media-driven landscape, during a brief hiatus from Scarlet, Kat and her struggle with her racial and sexual identity in addition to her relationship with Adena, and Sutton in the aftermath of her decision to end her relationship with Richard due to the realization that it could hinder her from advancing in her career.

The third season sees Jane entering a new relationship with a fellow writer named Ryan (Dan Jeannotte) and collaborating with Jacqueline on a story regarding the abuse of models at the hands of a prominent photographer. Kat, in a career shift, becomes inspired to run for city council, supported by her campaign manager Tia (Alexis Floyd), with whom she also becomes romantically involved. Surprised by Adena's return during her campaign, Kat ponders whether her past relationship with Adena is unfinished. Sutton, while content in her role as a fashion assistant, considers pursuing a career as a fashion designer while navigating her rekindled—and newly public—relationship with Richard.

The fourth season sees Jane achieving great professional success: she is listed as a Forbes 30 under 30 writers to watch, gets her own vertical and writes some of her best work. However, she struggles in her personal life in this season: she has to cope with Ryan's infidelity and she goes through her preventive double mastectomy. Kat, after deciding to focus on herself for a while, has to navigate being friends with Adena while working together. However, not long after, she is forced out from Scarlet for exposing a board member's support for conversion therapy and becomes a bartender at Belle. Sutton, appears to be living her dream: she is promoted to stylist and, after spending most of the season in a long-distance relationship with Richard, she gets married and is expecting her first baby. Notwithstanding, after going through an unexpected miscarriage, she realizes that kids are not in her future and the couple reaches a major crossroads.

The fifth and final season showcases Jane attempting to navigate being a manager for the first time and all the challenges that it entails, including her feelings for her coworker Scott. Kat is working on a new project with Adena, to help former prisoners to reintegrate into society. They reconnect and Kat also realizes that she should quit the Belle and pursue bigger things. Sutton is trying to navigate the pain of her divorce, her possible problem with alcohol and how to succeed in her career in the midst of all this. This is the last season of the show.

== Cast and characters ==
=== Main ===
- Katie Stevens as Jane Sloan, an editor at Scarlet magazine
- Aisha Dee as Kat Edison, former social media director at Scarlet magazine
- Meghann Fahy as Sutton Brady-Hunter, a fashion stylist at Scarlet magazine
- Sam Page as Richard Hunter (seasons 1–4; guest season 5), a Scarlet magazine board member, and general counsel for Safford Publishing which owns the magazine
- Matt Ward as Alex Crawford (seasons 1–4; guest season 5), a writer at Scarlet magazine
- Melora Hardin as Jacqueline Carlyle, editor-in-chief of Scarlet magazine
- Stephen Conrad Moore as Oliver Grayson (season 2–5; recurring, season 1), head of Scarlet magazine's fashion department
- Nikohl Boosheri as Adena El-Amin (season 2; recurring seasons 1, 3–5), a photographer, and Kat's love interest

=== Recurring ===
- Adam Capriolo as Andrew, Jacqueline's assistant
- Stephanie Costa as Sage Aiello, a writer at Scarlet magazine
- Dan Jeannotte as Ryan Decker (season 1–4; guest season 5), a freelance writer, whom Jane becomes romantically involved with
- Emily C. Chang as Lauren Park (season 1; guest season 3), an executive editor at Scarlet
- Luca James Lee as Ben Chau (season 2), an OB/GYN, whom Jane becomes romantically involved with
- Siobhan Murphy as Cleo Williams (season 2), a newly hired Scarlet magazine board member
- Kiara Groulx as Carly Grayson (seasons 3–4; guest season 5), Oliver's daughter
- Shyrley Rodriguez as Angie Flores (season 3; guest season 2), a former receptionist and Scarlet new social media director
- Peter Vack as Patrick Duchand (season 3; guest season 4), the new head of Scarlet magazine's digital department
- Alexis Floyd as Tia Clayton (season 3), Kat's campaign manager whom Kat begins a relationship with
- Gildart Jackson as Ian Carlyle (season 4–5; guest seasons 1 and 3), Jacqueline's husband
- Rachel Mutombo as Darby Gruss (season 4–5), a manager at The Belle
- Mat Vairo as Scott Coleman (season 4–5), a columnist who Jane becomes romantically involved with
- Aidan Devine as RJ Safford (season 4; guest season 3), the president of the company that owns Scarlet
- Alex Paxton-Beesley as Eva Rhodes (season 4; guest season 5), a conservative lawyer and Kat's secret lover
- Yasha Jackson as Dr. Alicia Golden (season 4; guest season 5)
- Tom Austen as Cody (season 4), bartender and Kat's love interest
- Raven-Symoné as Alice Knight (season 4), a beauty influencer
- Christine Nguyen as Addison Harper (season 5; guest season 4), a writer who works for Jane's vertical at Scarlet

== Episodes ==
=== Series overview ===
Season	Episodes	Originally released	
Season	Episodes	First released	Last released
1	10	June 20, 2017	September 5, 2017
2	10	June 12, 2018	August 7, 2018
3	10	April 9, 2019	June 11, 2019
4	16	January 23, 2020	July 16, 2020
5	6	May 26, 2021	June 30, 2021

=== Season 1 (2017) ===
No. overall	No. in season	Title	Directed by	Written by	Original release date	U.S. viewers (millions)
1	1	"Pilot"	Gary Fleder	Sarah Watson	June 20, 2017 (Note: The pilot episode of The Bold Type was aired as a special preview on June 20, 2017, three weeks before its official television premiere on July 11, 2017.)	0.24 (preview); 0.36 (premiere)
Best friends Jane, Kat and Sutton met as assistants at Scarlet magazine under the guiding eye of editor-in-chief, Jacqueline. Four years on, Jane is a newly promoted writer, tasked with stalking her ex-boyfriend without the use of social media. Kat, who was promoted to social media director two years ago, goes after Adena, a proud Muslim lesbian artist who pulled her feature story from the August issue. Meanwhile, Sutton tries not to feel left behind as her friends reach their career goals, and Jane and Kat discover that Sutton has been having a secret affair with Richard, Scarlet's lawyer.
2	2	"O Hell No"	Victor Nelli Jr.	Sarah Watson	July 11, 2017	0.30
At a crossroads, Sutton approaches Lauren about taking the next step in her career, and in a supportive move Lauren sets her up with Richard for an informational interview which later leads to a job offer in advertisement sales. Jacqueline appoints Jane with writing an article for the sex column, but Jane has never had an orgasm. Struggling for inspiration, Jane visits a sexologist, and after a yoni egg mishap, she writes a completely honest piece. When Adena returns to New York, Kat finds herself questioning her sexual identity as her feelings for Adena continue to grow, and things are further complicated when Kat discovers that Adena has a girlfriend.
3	3	"The Woman Behind the Clothes"	Tara Nicole Weyr	Justin W. Lo	July 18, 2017	0.28
After posting a gender inequality article online, Kat finds herself a victim of Internet trolling. Sutton and Jane are worried about Kat's safety, but Kat's confidence does not see her worried, not until one of the trolls uncovers a topless photo she took. Sutton goes after an assistant's job in the fashion department but has to juggle preparation for the fashion show while still being Lauren's assistant. Meanwhile, Jane ditches her date with Ryan to chase an article on a congresswoman, but when she is revoked, Jane comes up with a different angle to get her story.
4	4	"If You Can't Do It with Feeling"	Anna Mastro	Wendy Straker Hauser	July 25, 2017	0.36
Adena asks Kat to write her a letter of recommendation so she can extend her work visa. While taking a walk, a man makes a racist remark towards Adena, and when Kat retaliates, she is arrested for assault. After Jacqueline bails Kat out, Kat and Adena reunite and share a kiss. Jane is invited to speak on a panel about rising political voices under 30, but the panel does not go as Jane had anticipated. Sutton is concerned that Oliver has her professional background confused with one of the other applicants, and when the truth comes out, Sutton puts everything she has into making one last impression, which earns her the fashion assistant job.
5	5	"No Feminism in the Champagne Room"	Jamie Travis	Lynn Sternberger	August 1, 2017	0.35
Jane is sued for defamation after writing an article about a woman who left her finance job to become a stripper. When a settlement hearing does not go as planned, Jane learns of the consequences her article has had. After sharing their first kiss and spending the night together, Kat and Adena deal with their feelings of guilt and trepidation. As Kat overcomes her fear of being in a relationship and is ready to take a leap of faith, Adena reveals she is leaving for Paris to reconcile with her girlfriend. Meanwhile, Sutton receives her contract from Oliver, though her salary is much lower than she initially expected. Gaining confidence to confront Oliver, Sutton asks for some job perks in return for leaving her salary as it is.
6	6	"The Breast Issue"	Jamie Travis	Matt McGuinness	August 8, 2017	0.34
Kat embarks on a social media campaign to free the nipple and to raise breast cancer awareness and testing. Jane is assigned to write about a doctor testing women in their 20s for the BRCA mutation. Given that Jane's mother died of breast cancer, she is encouraged by Kat, Sutton, and Jaqueline to test herself for a BRCA mutation, but she is hesitant to do so. Meanwhile, Sutton attempts to prove her capabilities in the fashion department by obtaining a $5000 necklace for Oliver; however, she loses the necklace in a cab and begins a search for the necklace with Alex.
7	7	"Three Girls in a Tub"	Jann Turner	Ian Deitchman & Kristin Robinson	August 15, 2017	0.29
Kat has trouble teaching her new employee how to tweet for Scarlet's social media and learns how to manage her expanding team. Jane attempts to juggle dating two men. Sutton begins to make connections in the fashion world for her job. She accidentally attends high tea not realizing why it is called "high tea" before becoming high herself. All three have dinner at Richard's apartment but end up spending most of the night in the bathtub. Jane tells Ryan that she cannot have a relationship with him because she wants to have a strong relationship with only one man. Sutton makes the difficult decision of breaking up with Richard due to the pressure of keeping their relationship a secret.
8	8	"The End of the Beginning"	Jann Turner	Justin W. Lo & Wendy Straker Hauser	August 22, 2017	0.28
Kat stays over at Jane's and Sutton's place while her apartment is being cleaned of bed bugs. Layoff rumors sweep through Scarlet like wildfire as levels of anxiety rise throughout the whole building. All three go on a group date since they have found themselves single for the first time in a while. Jane and Alex put their hats in the ring for the chance to work for the all-digital magazine Incite. Sutton runs a photoshoot while Oliver is trapped in Cuba but learns along the way why it is important to stand up for herself from Jacqueline. Kat continues to stay in contact with Adena while she is in Paris but finds out she wants to return to New York since she is unable to reconcile with her girlfriend.
9	9	"Before Tequila Sunrise"	Victor Nelli Jr.	Lynn Sternberger	August 29, 2017	0.36
Due to Donald Trump being back in New York, Sutton, Jane, Ryan, and Alex are stuck in Scarlet. Kat rushes off to see Adena after she has trouble getting back in the country. Kat uses her parents' miles to buy a ticket so as to get behind customs to meet up with Adena. Jane is still unsure about whether to take the job at Incite or stay at Scarlet. After drinking, Sutton and Alex share a kiss and end up hooking up as Adena and Kat do the same at the airport. Kat thinks of going with Adena but ends up deciding to stay.
10	10	"Carry the Weight"	Victor Nelli Jr.	Sarah Watson	September 5, 2017	0.33
Sutton and Alex attempt to have a relationship, but it is cut short when Jacqueline catches them kissing in the stairwell. Richard later confesses to Sutton that he should "have fought for her". Jane is tasked with what she wanted to be her first article at Scarlet but ended up being her last, about Mia, a sexual assault survivor. Kat buries herself in her work, trying to get over her recent decision of not joining Adena. Kat, Jane, and Sutton learn that Jacqueline is a sexual assault survivor herself. Jane ultimately leaves Scarlet magazine, Kat embarks on an adventure to be with Adena in South America, and Sutton takes Oliver's place at a fashion event.

=== Season 2 (2018) ===
No. overall	No. in season	Title	Directed by	Written by	Original release date	U.S. viewers (millions)
11	1	"Feminist Army"	Victor Nelli Jr.	Amanda Lasher	June 12, 2018	0.30
Kat comes back from her trip with Jane and Sutton greeting her at the airport. She is blissfully in love with Adena and wants everyone to know that she has a girlfriend. Adena is also coming back to New York because her visa has been approved for three months. Jane writes her first article for Incite, but the woman that she interviews takes an unexpected turn for her article. A new corporate policy at Scarlet allows Sutton and Richard to date, but she is faced with a dilemma due to a gossip about her "sleeping her way to the top". Adena becomes upset that Kat keeps flaunting their fairly new relationship.
12	2	"Rose Colored Glasses"	Victor Nelli Jr.	Wendy Straker Hauser	June 12, 2018	0.18
Kat struggles with her identity after Jacqueline asks her to write a bio about herself and Alex recommends she includes a blurb about her race, which she sees as unimportant. Sutton begins to question why Oliver gave her the job, and whether he gave her the job for her talent, or due to rumors about her being a flirt, and struggles during a photoshoot. Jane leaves a voicemail for Emma, apologizing for the article, but the voicemail ends up online. After attempting to clear up the incident on the news, Jane is fired. Meanwhile, Kat introduces Adena to her parents.
13	3	"The Scarlet Letter"	James Travis	Céline Geiger	June 19, 2018	0.40
Sutton is put in an awkward position after Kat pressures her into hiring Adena for her photoshoot, but together they end up improvising a new shoot after realizing the original idea was not working. Jane is unsuccessful at finding a job, but interviews a doctor named Ben for a freelance article. Jacqueline and Cleo disagree with how to promote the "body positivity" issue of Scarlet. Jane returns to Scarlet to ask for her job back, but Jacqueline believes Jane needs to "live in the moment" of failure.
14	4	"OMG"	Jamie Travis	Neel Shah	June 26, 2018	0.33
Jane goes on a date with Ben but is torn when she discovers he is religious. She then runs into Pinstripe and discovers he is a gossip writer, and accompanies him to a party, but realizes that gossip reporting is not for her. Jane tells Ben why she is angry at religion, which has to do with her mother's death. Sutton, discouraged by her lack of advancement at Scarlet, makes friends with influencer Brooke Langley, but things take a turn when Brooke racks up a $500 cocaine charge on the Scarlet credit card. Kat starts meeting some of Adena's friends but becomes anxious when Adena refuses to answer how many people she has slept with. Adena admits that she has not told Kat because she is protecting herself and their relationship, and they both admit that they love each other.
15	5	"Stride of Pride"	Anna Mastro	Michelle A. Badillo & Caroline Levich	July 3, 2018	0.36
Jane is disheartened after learning she did not get a job due to them wanting to increase their diversity hire resulting in Kat talking to her about her white privilege. Kat is tasked with the job of hiring new staff, but the person she picks is denied due to her lack of a college degree. However, after a talk with the board, she is given the go-ahead to hire her. Sutton discovers the guy she is seeing is married and decides to tell the wife about the affair. After telling her, she spots Richard with a new girl. Kat is shocked after having a sex dream about one of Adena's friends.
16	6	"The Domino Effect"	Anna Mastro	Amy-Jo Perry	July 10, 2018	0.34
Jane is nominated for an award for the article she wrote about Jacqueline's assault and is asked to write a follow-up piece. In the process, she finds out that Jacqueline was not the only victim. Kat goes out with some of Adena's friends and ends up making out with one of the women there. Sutton is tasked with dressing Richard's new girlfriend and discovers they used to date. Kat comes clean to Adena and Adena realizes that Kat's curiosity about women will not go away, but neither of them wants to break up. Jacqueline hires Jane back at Scarlet.
17	7	"Betsy"	Marta Cunningham	Matt McGuinness	July 17, 2018	0.27
Jane is shocked to find a gun in her and Sutton's apartment, something Jane takes issue with. Kat and Adena talk and Adena suggests an open relationship in order to allow for Kat to explore her sexuality. Jane returns to Scarlet and decides to write an article about Sutton and her gun. Sutton attempts to contact of Brooke in order to get a bag she needs for a photoshoot. Sutton shows Jane and Kat her shotgun, and Jane reveals she was close to the Columbine massacre when it happened. In order to understand Sutton's side better, Jane goes shooting with her but immediately hates it and asks for the gun to be removed from their house. Kat starts having casual sex with her Uber driver. Jane realizes that Sutton shot in order to have a form of control while dealing with her alcoholic mother. Sutton reveals to Oliver that she does not have the bag he wants, but Oliver gets the bag due to a favor owed to him. Oliver tells Sutton that they are a team who work together. Sutton melts her gun down into earrings.
18	8	"Plan B"	Marta Cunningham	Becky Hartman Edwards	July 24, 2018	0.33
A trip to the gynecologist results in Jane's being told that due to the BRCA gene mutation, she needs to start thinking about children. Kat is approached by Cleo and asked to be the spokesperson of a skincare product, while Sutton attempts to juggle the fashion department while Oliver is away. Kat later is told by Ryan that the CEO of the skincare company donates to conservative companies, and Jane pitches a piece about motherhood to Jacqueline. Sutton attempts to make the photoshoot work on the budget she is given which results in Oliver loving the photoshoot. Kat does an ad for the product, but at the end reveals the truth about the company, resulting in Jacqueline explaining to Cleo why they do not do ads like that. Jane tells Ben about her BRCA gene mutation and is upset by his reaction. Jane later realizes the reason she has trouble picturing herself as a mother is because she has so few memories of her own. The next day, Jane calls her brother to ask about their mother, Kat is encouraged by Jacqueline to do ads for companies that inspire her, and Sutton is invited by Oliver to go with him to Paris for Fashion Week.
19	9	"Trippin"	Victor Nelli Jr.	Céline Geiger & Neel Shah	July 31, 2018	0.29
Sutton prepares for her trip to Paris as Kat prepares for a relaunch of the Scarlet website. During a meeting, Jacqueline informs everyone that comments would be disabled in stories moving forward. Jane becomes overwhelmed when Ben becomes too involved in her fertility plan. Sutton hits a snag when she cannot find her real birth certificate needed for a passport, so Jane, Kat, and she drive to her hometown in Harrisburg, Pennsylvania in order to get her birth certificate from her mother, Babs. There, Babs attempts to convince Sutton she has changed by getting a job and attending school, but Sutton refuses to believe her, not wanting to get her hopes up again. Babs reveals she sobered up after realizing she wanted to be part of Sutton's life again, and Sutton agrees to slowly let her in again. Jacqueline realizes the mistake she made and reinstates the comment section again. Sutton gets her birth certificate in on time as Kat reveals she is going as well. Jane reveals she has decided to freeze her eggs, and Kat tells Adena that she wants to be with just her.
20	10	"We'll Always Have Paris"	Tara Nicole Weyr	Annie Weisman	August 7, 2018	0.31
Jane goes to get her eggs frozen but discovers her insurance does not cover it. Cleo tells Jacqueline the board is talking about replacing her. Adena discovers she was approved for her visa and goes with Kat to Paris. Ben reveals that due to his role as a doctor, his family can get their eggs frozen for free and says that he and Jane can lie and declare themselves domestic partners to get Jane in. Pinstripe tells Jane he wants to help pay for her to freeze her eggs, and in the process he tells Jane he still likes her and they kiss. Jane decides to go to Paris. Kat then goes to meet with Coco and discovers that Adena has not produced any work since going to New York. Kat and Adena come to a wall in their relationship when Kat realizes Adena produced work when she was not with her. Richard goes to Paris and confesses his feelings for Sutton. Richard discovers there is a shortlist from the board of people to replace Jacqueline. Adena does not turn up to the party, but Sutton and Jane tell Kat all the reasons why they love her.

=== Season 3 (2019) ===
No. overall	No. in season	Title	Directed by	Written by	Original release date	U.S. viewers (millions)
21	1	"The New Normal"	Victor Nelli Jr.	Wendy Straker Hauser	April 9, 2019	0.18
Jacqueline is replaced as head of digital (but remains head of print) by Patrick Duchand. Jane is determined to find out the story behind Patrick but is surprised about what she learns. Kat continues to struggle after her breakup with Adena and realizes that it is time to start being honest about how she is feeling. Sutton and Richard take the next step in their relationship and decide to move in together.
22	2	"Plus It Up"	Ellen S. Pressman	Amanda Lasher & Matt McGuinness	April 16, 2019	0.22
Jane and Ryan come to a head when Jane does not want Ryan involved in her egg freezing process. Kat learns that a lesbian bar she frequents is to be shut down and makes an attempt to save it. Sutton struggles with adjusting to living with Richard and discovers that Oliver is hiding a secret.
23	3	"Stroke of Genius"	Jamie Travis	Neel Shah	April 23, 2019	0.24
Alex meets with a woman who wrote a story about feeling pressured during sex; however, he is surprised to learn that the story is about him. Kat goes to volunteer for her local councilwoman who is running and is encouraged by the woman's campaign manager, Tia, to help with her social media. Jane discovers that Ryan was watching porn on her computer and realizes that she is vanilla. Sutton realizes that she wants to be a designer.
24	4	"The Deep End"	Jamie Travis	Becky Hartman Edwards	April 30, 2019	0.24
While doing a piece, Jane realizes that a photographer, Pamela Dolan, has been abusing her models and approaches Jacqueline to do a story on it. Jane fears that Jacqueline is going to step down and let Patrick take over. Kat decides to run for councilwoman but is reluctant after realizing her past abortion could be brought up. Sutton is determined to get Oliver's recommendation on a dress for a seminar she is trying to get into. Oliver gets advice from Sutton about parenting the child of an old friend.
25	5	"Technical Difficulties"	Anna Mastro	Lijah J. Barasz & Celeste Vasquez	May 7, 2019	0.17
Jane manages to land an interview with a model abused by Pamela Dolan, but after Scarlet is hacked by a ransomware group, she realizes a leak could expose the identity of the model. Sutton and Richard have dinner with Kat, Jane, and their friends, but discovers that Richard has been discussing their future without her. Meanwhile, she also discovers she got into the design seminar she applied for. Kat asks Tia about the nature of their relationship as they grow closer.
26	6	"#TBT"	Anna Mastro	Céline Geiger & Amy-Jo Perry	May 14, 2019	0.24
With Scarlet's emails leaked, it is revealed that back when Jane, Kat, and Sutton first started, Jacqueline made a comment towards someone almost dying, as the trio reflects back to when they all met in 2014: Jane is an intern assigned to Lauren, Kat is under social media having her ideas shot down by her boss, and Sutton is a temp who is about to be jobless. In the present, Sutton talks to Richard about the day they met and Kat confronts Tia about their feelings for each other.
27	7	"Mixed Messages"	Geary McLeod	Wendy Straker Hauser & Nikita T. Hamilton	May 21, 2019	0.26
Jane starts looking for a new roommate, prospecting Alex as a possible candidate, but Ryan seems hesitant about the idea. Sutton plans Richard's birthday party which leads to friction between the pair when Richard tells her that he does not want to celebrate his birthday. Kat and Tia are racially profiled while canvassing a neighborhood, but both want to approach the incident differently. Meanwhile, Jane and Jacqueline find a photographer who used to work for Pamela Dolan.
28	8	"Revival"	Geary McLeod	Matt McGuinness	May 28, 2019	0.30
Jacqueline and Jane interview a Pamela Dolan model and ask her to speak on the record, on the condition that other models speak as well. The pair decide to do a photoshoot and an article and hire Adena to photograph the girls. Kat runs into Adena while she is at Scarlet and realizes she might not be over her. Pamela Dolan receives word of their article and threatens to sue the models. Finally, they realize the only part they need is a statement from Pamela herself. Adena confides to Jane that she is not over Kat. Sutton struggles with Richard wanting to pay for everything, but the two talk about their dependence on each other. Meanwhile, Sutton discovers that her class has been tasked with designing pieces for a fashion show that could kickstart the students' careers. Kat meets up with Adena to talk about how their relationship ended.
29	9	"Final Push"	Kimberly McCullough	Neel Shah	June 4, 2019	0.25
Adena reveals to Kat that what happened in Paris was a mistake, leaving her confused. Later, Jacqueline tells Kat she needs to start looking for a replacement for when she wins the election, which upsets her. Kat opens up to Adena about her worries around leaving Scarlet and Adena gives her words of encouragement. Later at the election party, it's announced that Kat did not win. Jane and Jacqueline confront Pamela Dolan about her abuse, but she denies all the claims. Later, the two discover Pamela has tipped off another magazine about their story to reduce their credibility. Jane and Jacqueline decide to publish the story straight to the dot com in order to expose Pamela. Later, Ryan surprises Jane at the election party but reveals that he kissed someone while in New York, angering Jane. Oliver asks Sutton to watch Carlie, who claims she's sick. However, Sutton later finds out that Carlie is feeling self-conscious because of picture day. This inspires Sutton to use 'real people' rather than models for her designs. Richard is offered a job in San Francisco but turns it down to stay with Sutton.
30	10	"Breaking Through the Noise"	Victor Nelli Jr.	Lijah J. Barasz & Becky Hartman Edwards & Celeste Vasquez	June 11, 2019	0.27
Kat continues to feel conflict about her feelings between Tia and Adena. After sleeping together, Adena reveals that she never stopped loving her. At work, Kat decides to use issues she planned to explore if she won the election together with her job. She ultimately breaks up with Tia and decides to focus on herself before dating Adena again, who reveals that she was hired by Scarlet as their in-house photographer. Ryan attempts to make amends with Jane, who is still angry at him. However, she decides to give him another chance after realizing how much she still loves him. Sutton's fashion show is a success and someone requests a dress. However, whilst designing the dress and working on a photoshoot, realizes she's more passionate about the behind the scenes aspect, rather than the design aspect. Afterwards, she encourages Richard to go to San Francisco for the job. After Jane brings up the fact they use 14-year old models, Jacqueline instructs the team to come up with a new issue that promotes better messages. Upon going into the work the next day, Sutton, Jane, and Kat see the office being emptied and Jacqueline nowhere to be seen.

=== Season 4 (2020) ===
No. overall	No. in season	Title	Directed by	Written by	Original release date	U.S. viewers (millions)
31	1	"Legends of the Fall Issue"	Geary McLeod	Neel Shah	January 23, 2020	0.13
At the beginning of the episode, we see Jane, Sutton and Kat climbing over a fence and potentially getting in trouble by the police. Earlier that morning, the scene opens with the office furniture and all of Jacqueline's possessions being cleared out. Patrick declares that he is the new Editor in Chief of Scarlet. Kat learns from RJ that the latest issue, the Fall issue, will not be released to the public because it was never approved and readers (particularly those in the middle of America) will not read it. The girls decide that Jacqueline should at least view the printed issue, so they decide to break into the publishing house to obtain some copies before they're destroyed. They manage to obtain some copies and deliver them to some of the contributors - such as the photographers, make up artists etc. Jacqueline's letter from the editor and pages from the issue are released. The board is not happy and are wanting to track down whoever sourced the pages and the girls face the prospect of getting fired. Kat requests that RJ re-hires Jacquline as a result of the public response. RJ agrees to have Jacqueline back; however, the magazine will now be digital only.
32	2	"#scarlet"	Geary McLeod	Wendy Straker Hauser	January 30, 2020	0.23
Jane goes for a mammogram with Sutton and Kat being there for support. The girls go out to a new bar and see Andrew (Jacqueline's assistant) performing whilst dressed in drag. Pinstripe (Ryan) and Jane are struggling to connect. Jacqueline announces that Scarlet digital will be very different and more channels are coming onboard. Ian is not happy that Jacqueline is back at Scarlet. Jane asks for her old desk back. Sutton is regretting asking Richard to move across the country. Kat catches up with a performer she met five years ago and regrets almost outing her when she wasn't ready. Sutton and Richard get engaged.
33	3	"Marathon"	Kimberly McCullough	Matt McGuinness	February 6, 2020	0.15
Kat meets a transgender runner named Chloe who is unable to run in the New York City Marathon because the officials won't recognise them. Jane and Pinstripe (Ryan) try a new position to re-ignite their love life; however, Jane still has trust issues. Sutton catches up with someone from design school and becomes embarrassed that she gave it all up to remain Oliver's assistant. Kat encourages Chloe to enter the Marathon by purchasing another runner's bib. Chloe; however, doesn't want to enter in the race as somebody else as they're keen for their own recognition. Jacqueline and Ian are struggling to connect because of the demands that Jacqueline is facing now that Scarlet has gone digital. Jane seeks clarification from Pinstripe about what happened when he kissed the other girl and forgives him. Kat arranges a meeting with the main official of the New York City Marathon and encourages him to recognise Chloe (and other transgender runners). Chloe ends up running in the Marathon under their own name. The girls promise that next year, they'll also be in the Marathon - a promise they make every year.
34	4	"Babes in Toyland"	Kimberly McCullough	Chase Baxter & Nikita T. Hamilton	February 13, 2020	0.11
Jane and Pinstripe (Ryan) are hanging out a lot but their love life is supposedly non-existent. Kat encourages Sutton to style her own clothes and become her own model so that when it comes to a promotion, everyone will know who she is. Sage's friend releases a series of vibrators, which many of the office staff try and love. Alex meets Lisa, a tech assistant, and they hit it off. Jane asks Pinstripe to go to a sex club with her; however, he's reluctant to go. Kat is enraged that an ad for the vibrator gets pulled, so her and Sage go on a twitter rampage to correct the sexism surrounding male ads. Jane, Sutton and Kat go to the sex club together. Jane kisses a man at the club. Pinstripe decides to turn up and Jane admits to kissing someone else. Their love life then improves after Jane confesses her love for him.
35	5	"Tearing Down the Donut Wall"	Erica Dunton	Sascha Rothchild	February 20, 2020	0.13
Jane pitches a millennial wedding edition of Scarlet. The staff have their own opinions about weddings, mostly negative. Carly, Oliver's 'daughter', is having issues with her school uniform. Kat throws her hat back into the dating pool with 'no string attached'. Jane interviews Jacqueline about marriage, not knowing that her and Ian are having issues. Sutton doesn't help with Carly's school uniform, suggesting that there is no problem in expressing one's individuality and even complimenting Carly on the changes. Oliver is not impressed and makes this known to Sutton. Jane listens to her phone's recording of her interview with Jacqueline and catches the private conversation between her an Ian about their marriage. Sutton admits to Oliver that she doesn't want her wedding dress to be like everyone else's. Kat's dating doesn't go according to plan after attending a birthday party. Sutton tries on a wedding dress which looks perfect on her. Jane admits to Jacqueline that she overheard the conversation she had with Ian, to which Jacqueline walks away. Oliver decides with Carly to re-decorate the guest bedroom, so she can express her individuality (without needing to change the uniform). Jane reconnects with her dad.
36	6	"To Peg or Not to Peg"	Erica Dunton	Lara Azzopardi	February 27, 2020	0.15
37	7	"The Space Between"	Anne Renton	Ashley Skidmore	March 5, 2020	0.13
38	8	"Stardust"	Anne Renton	Lori Lakin Hutcherson	March 12, 2020	0.16
39	9	"5, 6, 7, 8"	Victor Nelli Jr.	Lauren Parks & Celeste Vasquez	March 19, 2020	0.17
Sutton and Richard have decided on a wedding date, which means Kat and Jane can plan a bachelorette party! But Sutton is not in a celebratory mood as she overhead Jacqueline yelling at Oliver for her mistake, has to tell Jane and Kat she's moving to San Francisco with Richard, and she has to put in her notice with Oliver. Jane and Kat finally learn what's going on and decide to change their dance class bachelorette party into a night where they help Sutton right her mistake instead.
40	10	"Some Kind of Wonderful"	Victor Nelli Jr.	Lara Azzopardi	March 26, 2020	0.16
Sutton's wedding day has arrived, but Sutton's plan to join Richard in San Francisco after her nuptials are complicated when Oliver offers her a promotion. Jane deals with a realization about Ryan. Kat tries to hold a board member accountable, but she faces accountability herself.
41	11	"Leveling Up"	Geary McLeod	Neel Shah	June 11, 2020	0.19
Three months have passed. Kat's new job search takes on extra urgency when her parents pay her a visit. Jane adjusts to life after her mastectomy and as the editor of her new vertical. Sutton's promotion faces its first obstacle when she promises an actress a certain designer but is denied because of rumors that the actress stole from a previous shoot.
42	12	"Snow Day"	Melora Hardin	Sascha Rothchild	June 18, 2020	0.18
43	13	"Lost"	Erin Ehrlich	Celeste Vasquez	June 25, 2020	0.17
44	14	"The Truth Will Set You Free"	Erin Ehrlich	Ashley Skidmore	July 2, 2020	0.17
45	15	"Love"	Aprill Winney	Wendy Straker Hauser	July 9, 2020	0.18
Kat finally admits to herself she has feelings for her foe, Eva. Jane tries to help one of her employee's friends who was wrongfully terminated, and, in the process, finds out her employee is attracted to her. Jacqueline and her husband try to focus on their issues. Alex questions his protective instincts after his girlfriend is accosted at a club. Sutton and Richard's feelings about having children finally come to a head.
46	16	"Not Far from the Tree"	Aprill Winney	Chase Baxter & Neel Shah	July 16, 2020	0.20

=== Season 5 (2021) ===
No. overall	No. in season	Title	Directed by	Written by	Original release date	U.S. viewers (millions)
47	1	"Trust Fall"	Jill Carter	Sascha Rothchild & Andrew Steier & Wendy Straker Hauser	May 26, 2021	0.18
48	2	"The Crossover"	Jill Carter	Lara Azzopardi & Lori Lakin Hutcherson	June 2, 2021	0.14
49	3	"Rolling into the Future"	Yoko Okumura	Chase Baxter & Sahar Jahani	June 9, 2021	0.18
50	4	"Day Trippers"	Yoko Okumura	Julia Harter & Matt McGuinness	June 16, 2021	0.14
51	5	"Don't Turn Away"	Aprill Winney	Shani Am. Moore & Celeste Vasquez	June 23, 2021	0.19
52	6	"I Expect You to Have Adventures"	Aprill Winney	Lara Azzopardi & Jessica Kozak	June 30, 2021	0.21

== Production ==
=== Development ===
An untitled series inspired by the life of former Cosmopolitan editor-in-chief Joanna Coles was under development by NBC, Universal Television, The District, and Hearst Magazines in September 2015. The project was created by writer Sarah Watson, with Coles joining as executive producer along with Ruben Fleischer and David Bernad. On April 7, 2016, Freeform announced they had given a pilot order to the project, then-titled Issues. The project was ordered to series by Freeform in January 2017 and later renamed The Bold Type. Coles also provides a voice-over in the beginning of every episode that recaps previous events in the series. Two months after giving The Bold Type a full series order, Freeform announced that the series would debut on Tuesday, July 11, 2017. The pilot was aired as a special preview on June 20, three weeks before the series' premiere date. The July 11 premiere was a back-to-back airing of the series' first two episodes.

After the completion of its first season, The Bold Type received a two-season renewal, consisting of 10 episodes each, on October 4, 2017. At the same time, it was announced that Amanda Lasher would assume the role of showrunner after series creator Watson had "creative differences" with the network. The second season premiered on Freeform on June 12, 2018, while the third season premiered on April 9, 2019. In May 2019, the series was renewed for a fourth season at the 2019 Freeform upfront presentation; it was subsequently announced that Wendy Straker Hauser would be replacing Lasher as showrunner. On August 11, it was announced that the fourth season would consist of 18 episodes, the largest episode order for a season of the show. The fourth season premiered on January 23, 2020. On April 21, 2020, it was reported that production on the fourth season would not resume, and that the episode order had been cut to sixteen episodes due to the COVID-19 pandemic. On January 27, 2021, Freeform renewed the series for a fifth and final season which premiered on May 26, 2021. The final season had six episodes.

=== Casting ===
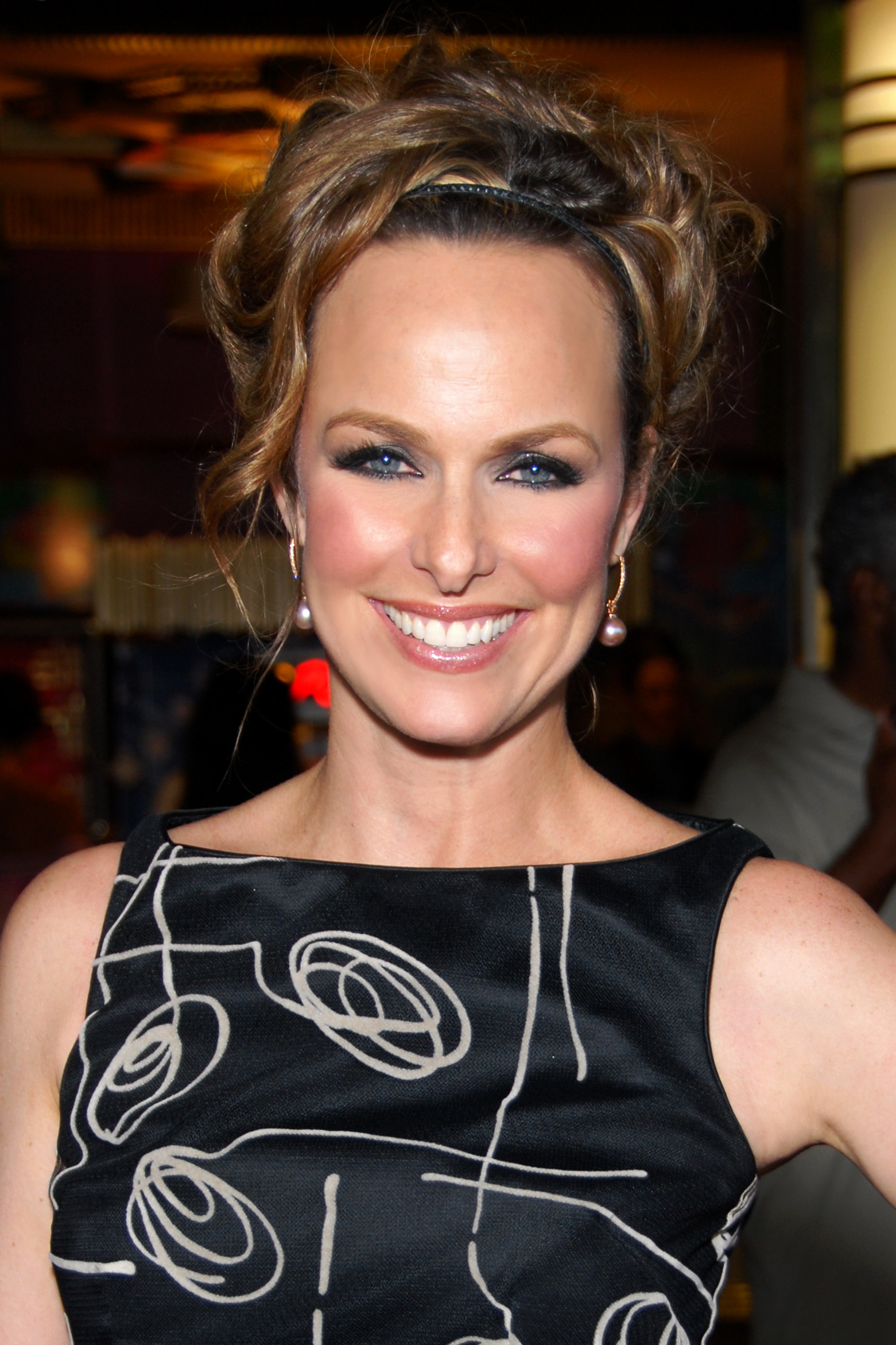
Melora Hardin portrays Jacqueline Carlyle, a character based on series executive producer and former Cosmopolitan editor-in-chief Joanna Coles

Sam Page, who portrays Richard Hunter, was the first cast member announced to be attached to the series. His casting was announced on August 16, 2016, which was followed by that of Melora Hardin on August 18. Hardin was cast as Jacqueline, the "quietly tough and confident editor-in-chief of Scarlet", who was later revealed to be based on Coles. The following week, Katie Stevens, Aisha Dee, and Meghann Fahy were announced as the series' leads. Stevens plays Jane, who lands her dream job as a writer for Scarlet, Dee portrays Kat, Scarlet's social media director, while Fahy plays Sutton, the last of the three friends to still be in an assistant's job. Matt Ward was also announced to be joining the main cast as Alex, a fellow writer at Scarlet.

On March 30, 2017, it was announced that Nikohl Boosheri was cast to recur on the series as Adena El-Amin, a photographer who develops a complicated romantic relationship with Kat. Emily C. Chang also joined the cast in a recurring capacity as a "blunt, overworked executive editor" named Lauren Park on May 2.

On March 8, 2018, it was reported that newcomers Luca James Lee and Siobhan Murphy were tapped for recurring roles for season two. Lee plays Ben, a potential love interest for Jane, while Murphy portrays Cleo, a new board member at Safford Publishing. Boosheri and Stephen Conrad Moore, who portrays Scarlet fashion department head, Oliver Grayson, were promoted to the main cast for season two after making recurring appearances in the previous season.

On September 7, 2018, it was reported that Peter Vack and Alexis Floyd would recur during the third season. Vack was announced to be portraying a new Scarlet staffer named Patrick Duchand, while Floyd portrays Tia, a campaign manager for a city council candidate.

In October 2019, Raven-Symoné was announced to have been cast in a recurring role as a beauty influencer named Alice for season four.

=== Filming ===
The pilot was filmed in Toronto, Canada in 2016, while filming locations for the rest of the series include Toronto and Montreal, Canada, and New York City. Filming in New York was done specifically to obtain exterior shots of the city's outdoor locations, such as the Brooklyn Bridge and Central Park. Production for the first season concluded on July 21, 2017.

In August 2018, it was reported that filming for the third season was underway. The fourth season of the series was in production as of September 2019. On March 12, 2020, Fahy announced that production of The Bold Type had been shut down due to the COVID-19 pandemic.

== Release ==
The Bold Type commenced airing in the US on Freeform on June 20, 2017, with a special preview of the series' first episode, while the series officially premiered on July 11. Episodes of the series become available on the streaming platform Hulu the day after the Freeform broadcast of each episode. A week prior to its scheduled Freeform premiere broadcast, the first episode of the second season was made available for streaming on Hulu on June 5, 2018. Regarding the series' relationship with the streaming platform, Freeform president, Tom Ascheim, stated that "Hulu does a lot of marketing for [Freeform] if they like the show, and they like The Bold Type a lot."

The series broadcasts on the streaming platform Stan in Australia; the first two seasons were made available on November 9, 2018, while the third-season premiere episode was released the day after its broadcast in the US. In Canada, the series airs exclusively on ABC Spark after premiering on the same day as its US premiere. In the United Kingdom, France, Germany, and Spain, the series premiered on February 9, 2018, on Amazon Prime Video. New episodes of the series become available in the UK the day after their US broadcasts.

== Reception ==
=== Critical response ===
On review aggregator website Rotten Tomatoes, the first season of The Bold Type holds an approval rating of 97%, with an average rating of 7.68/10 based on 29 reviews. The website's consensus reads, "Smart, hip, and exuberantly performed, The Bold Type sharply blends its soapy plotting with workplace drama that feels very of-the-moment." Metacritic, which uses a weighted average, assigned the series a score of 58 out of 100 based on 13 reviews, indicating "mixed or average reviews".

Caroline Framke of Vox commended the characterization of the three lead characters, highlighting that they are "struggling with more down-to-earth, complex issues than the genre that inspired them ever made room to take on," while Sonia Saraiya of Variety opines that the relationship between the trio "is neither saccharine nor unbelievable." Writing for Vulture, Matt Zoller Seitz praised The Bold Type's ability to balance its visuals and narrative standpoint, namely the series' "young, gorgeous, impeccably dressed core cast," its "Carrie Bradshaw daydream-vision of what it means to be a New York journalist," and how the series "respects journalism as work, in a way that more outwardly 'serious' narratives about the profession sometimes don't." Laura Bradley of Vanity Fair complimented the series' tone, specifically "Freeform's interpretation of 'boldness'—the feel-good, aspirational, Pinterest-friendly kind," and how said tone is "more than O.K.; it's necessary."

Vulture's Seitz continued to praise the series' "knack for balancing youth-focused melodrama and detailed explorations of journalistic conundrums" during its second season and credited the creators of the series for its realistic appeal and for "grounding the story in lived reality, not just secondhand research." Conversely, in a column on The New Republic, Rachel Syme criticized the unrealistic nature of the show, asserting that the series "needs to depict the difficult, ugly side of this business, as well as the cocktail parties and the blow-outs." On Rotten Tomatoes, the second season holds an approval rating of 100%, with an average rating of 8.76/10 based on 30 reviews. The website's consensus reads, "The Bold Type presents an aspirational yet refreshingly realistic portrait of young women's careers, friendships and love lives in a big city."

In a positive review of the first episode of the third season, Hannah Giorgis of The Atlantic echoed Seitz' sentiments regarding the series' realistic appeal and further expressed that the series, with its "earnest story lines and thoughtful touches, remains a delight to watch." In a mixed review for Forbes, Linda Maleh questioned the trajectory of the series due to the story's tendency to regress and concluded that when it "makes these big leaps forward and then takes them back, it diminishes its power." She added that she hoped the regression "doesn't become a trend for this otherwise wonderful show." The third season received a 100% approval rating on Rotten Tomatoes, with an average rating of 8/10 based on 9 reviews.

On Rotten Tomatoes, the fourth season holds a 71% approval rating on Rotten Tomatoes, with an average rating of 6.5/10 based on 7 reviews.

=== Ratings ===
==== Season 1 ====
Viewership and ratings per episode of The Bold Type
No.	Title	Air date	Rating (18–49)	Viewers (millions)	DVR (18–49)	DVR viewers (millions)	Total (18–49)	Total viewers (millions)
1	"Pilot"	July 11, 2017	0.2	0.36	—N/a	—N/a	—N/a	—N/a
2	"O Hell No"	July 11, 2017	0.1	0.30	0.2	0.30	0.3	0.60
3	"The Woman Behind the Clothes"	July 18, 2017	0.1	0.28	0.2	0.32	0.3	0.60
4	"If You Can't Do It With Feeling"	July 25, 2017	0.1	0.36	—N/a	—N/a	—N/a	—N/a
5	"No Feminism in the Champagne Room"	August 1, 2017	0.2	0.35	—N/a	0.35	—N/a	0.70
6	"The Breast Issue"	August 8, 2017	0.2	0.34	—N/a	0.40	—N/a	0.74
7	"Three Girls in a Tub"	August 15, 2017	0.1	0.29	0.2	0.43	0.3	0.72
8	"The End of the Beginning"	August 22, 2017	0.1	0.28	0.2	0.44	0.3	0.72
9	"Before Tequila Sunrise"	August 29, 2017	0.2	0.36	—N/a	0.36	—N/a	0.72
10	"Carry the Weight"	September 5, 2017	0.2	0.33	—N/a	—N/a	—N/a	—N/a

==== Season 2 ====
Viewership and ratings per episode of The Bold Type
No.	Title	Air date	Rating (18–49)	Viewers (millions)	DVR (18–49)	DVR viewers (millions)	Total (18–49)	Total viewers (millions)
1	"Feminist Army"	June 12, 2018	0.1	0.30	0.1	0.25	0.2	0.55
2	"Rose Colored Glasses"	June 12, 2018	0.1	0.18	0.1	0.18	0.2	0.36
3	"The Scarlet Letter"	June 19, 2018	0.2	0.40	0.1	0.26	0.3	0.66
4	"OMG"	June 26, 2018	0.1	0.33	0.1	0.21	0.3	0.55
5	"Stride of Pride"	July 3, 2018	0.2	0.36	0.1	0.25	0.3	0.61
6	"The Domino Effect"	July 10, 2018	0.1	0.34	0.1	0.20	0.2	0.54
7	"Betsy"	July 17, 2018	0.1	0.27	0.1	0.25	0.2	0.52
8	"Plan B"	July 24, 2018	0.1	0.33	0.1	0.18	0.2	0.51
9	"Trippin"	July 31, 2018	0.1	0.29	0.1	0.10	0.2	0.39
10	"We'll Always Have Paris"	August 7, 2018	0.1	0.31	0.1	0.25	0.2	0.56

==== Season 3 ====
Viewership and ratings per episode of The Bold Type
No.	Title	Air date	Rating (18–49)	Viewers (millions)	DVR (18–49)	DVR viewers (millions)	Total (18–49)	Total viewers (millions)
1	"The New Normal"	April 9, 2019	0.1	0.18	0.1	0.20	0.2	0.38
2	"Plus It Up"	April 16, 2019	0.1	0.22	0.1	0.20	0.2	0.42
3	"Stroke of Genius"	April 23, 2019	0.1	0.24	0.1	0.12	0.2	0.36
4	"The Deep End"	April 30, 2019	0.1	0.24	0.1	0.20	0.2	0.44
5	"Technical Difficulties"	May 7, 2019	0.1	0.17	0.1	0.23	0.2	0.40
6	"#TBT"	May 14, 2019	0.1	0.24	0.1	0.16	0.2	0.40
7	"Mixed Messages"	May 21, 2019	0.1	0.26	0.1	0.21	0.2	0.46
8	"Revival"	May 28, 2019	0.1	0.30	—N/a	—N/a	—N/a	—N/a
9	"Final Push"	June 4, 2019	0.1	0.25	0.1	0.23	0.2	0.48
10	"Breaking Through the Noise"	June 11, 2019	0.1	0.27	0.1	0.19	0.2	0.46

==== Season 4 ====
Viewership and ratings per episode of The Bold Type
No.	Title	Air date	Rating (18–49)	Viewers (millions)	DVR (18–49)	DVR viewers (millions)	Total (18–49)	Total viewers (millions)
1	"Legends of the Fall Issue"	January 23, 2020	0.1	0.13	0.1	0.23	0.2	0.36
2	"#scarlet"	January 30, 2020	0.1	0.23	0.1	0.29	0.2	0.52
3	"Marathon"	February 6, 2020	0.1	0.15	—N/a	0.20	—N/a	0.35
4	"Babes in Toyland"	February 13, 2020	0.0	0.11	0.1	0.21	0.1	0.32
5	"Tearing Down the Donut Wall"	February 20, 2020	0.1	0.13	0.1	0.22	0.2	0.35
6	"To Peg or Not to Peg"	February 27, 2020	0.1	0.15	0.1	0.23	0.2	0.38
7	"The Space Between"	March 5, 2020	0.1	0.13	TBD	TBD	TBD	TBD
8	"Stardust"	March 12, 2020	0.1	0.16	TBD	TBD	TBD	TBD
9	"5, 6, 7, 8"	March 19, 2020	0.1	0.17	TBD	TBD	TBD	TBD
10	"Some Kind of Wonderful"	March 26, 2020	0.1	0.16	TBD	TBD	TBD	TBD
11	"Leveling Up"	June 11, 2020	0.1	0.19	TBD	TBD	TBD	TBD
12	"Snow Day"	June 18, 2020	0.1	0.18	TBD	TBD	TBD	TBD
13	"Lost"	June 25, 2020	0.1	0.17	TBD	TBD	TBD	TBD
14	"The Truth Will Set You Free"	July 2, 2020	0.1	0.17	TBD	TBD	TBD	TBD
15	"Love"	July 9, 2020	0.1	0.18	TBD	TBD	TBD	TBD
16	"Not Far from the Tree"	July 16, 2020	0.1	0.20	TBD	TBD	TBD	TBD

==== Season 5 ====
Viewership and ratings per episode of The Bold Type
No.	Title	Air date	Rating (18–49)	Viewers (millions)	DVR (18–49)	DVR viewers (millions)	Total (18–49)	Total viewers (millions)
1	"Trust Fall"	May 26, 2021	0.1	0.17	TBD	TBD	TBD	TBD
2	"The Crossover"	June 2, 2021	0.1	0.14	TBD	TBD	TBD	TBD
3	"Rolling into the Future"	June 9, 2021	0.1	0.18	TBD	TBD	TBD	TBD
4	"Day Trippers"	June 16, 2021	0.1	0.14	TBD	TBD	TBD	TBD
5	"Don't Turn Away"	June 23, 2021	0.1	0.19	TBD	TBD	TBD	TBD
6	"I Expect You to Have Adventures"	June 30, 2021	0.1	0.21	TBD	TBD	TBD	TBD

=== Accolades ===
Year	Award	Category	Nominee	Result	Ref.
2017	Teen Choice Awards	Choice Summer TV Show	The Bold Type	Nominated	
2017	Teen Choice Awards	Choice Summer TV Star: Female	Aisha Dee	Nominated	
2018	GLAAD Media Awards	Outstanding Comedy Series	The Bold Type	Nominated	
2018	Teen Choice Awards	Choice Summer TV Show	The Bold Type	Nominated	
2018	Teen Choice Awards	Choice Summer TV Star	Aisha Dee	Nominated	
2018	Teen Choice Awards	Choice Summer TV Star	Meghann Fahy	Nominated	
2018	Teen Choice Awards	Choice Summer TV Star	Katie Stevens	Nominated	
2018	Imagen Awards	Best Actress – Television	Katie Stevens	Nominated	
2019	Satellite Awards	Best Drama Series	The Bold Type	Nominated	
2019	Teen Choice Awards	Choice Summer TV Show	The Bold Type	Nominated	
