= Tom Whidden =

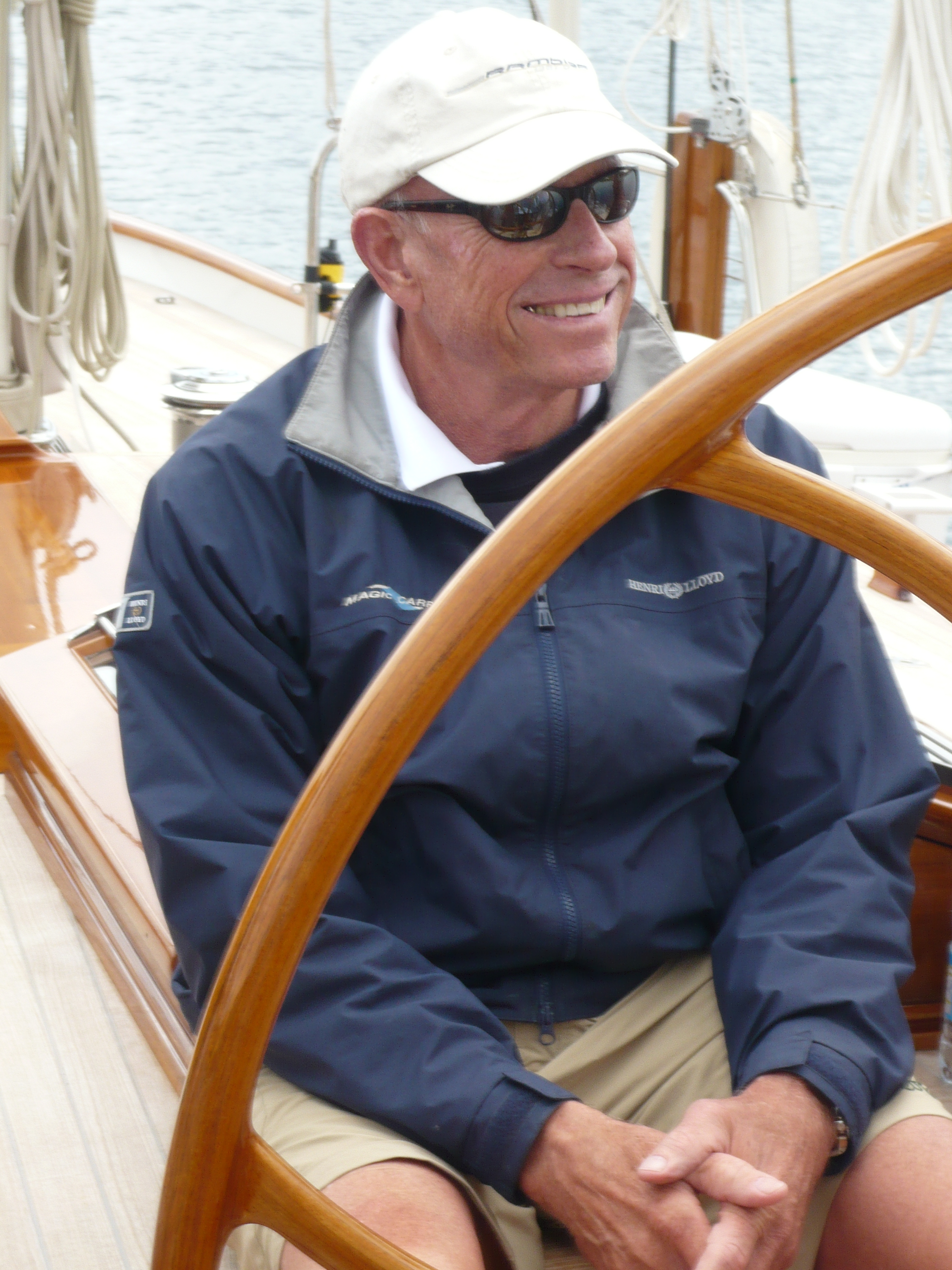
Tom Whidden in 2013

Thomas A. Whidden (born 1948) is one of the most-acclaimed sailors of all-time. He is a member of both the America's Cup Hall of Fame and the National Sailing Hall of Fame. Whidden joined North Sails, the world's largest sailmaker, in 1986, just before being part of the crew of the yacht Stars & Stripes in the victory over Australia in the 1987 America's Cup. He became CEO and co-owner of North Technology Group, formerly known as North Marine Group, parent company to North Sails, when it was established several years later.

Whidden, who began sailing at age ten at the Cedar Point Yacht Club in Westport, Connecticut, is one of the most experienced sailors in the history of the sport. "When I was 16, my dream was to become a sailmaker and race in the America's Cup," said Whidden of his years as a junior sailor on Long Island Sound. He attended Hoosac School and graduated from Colby College in Waterville, Maine. Whidden went on to sail with Dennis Conner in a total of eight America's Cup campaigns, beginning in 1979 as Conner's trial horse skipper. He has raced as tactician in five series races and has won three times (1980, 1987, 1988). Whidden was given a key to New York City from Mayor Ed Koch in 1987 after bringing the America's Cup back to the United States from Australia.

Whidden's leadership in the design and manufacturing of technologically advanced sails is unparalleled. Since Whidden has led North Sails, every America's Cup winner since 1992 and every Volvo Ocean Race winner since 1993 has raced with North Sails. Emirates Team New Zealand's recent win over Oracle Team USA in the 2017 America's Cup is largely credited to North, as the company designed and built ETNZ's boat, wings, sails, and spars.

Whidden has earned many accolades throughout his sailing career including Colby's "Carl Nelson Award" for Athletic Achievement in 1989, and the University Club "Man of the Year" award in 1987. In 2006, Whidden received the prestigious "A Life for Sailing" Award at the Trofeo Ermenegildo Zegna Regatta in Portofino, Italy, which is given biennially to a person who has devoted their life and career to sailing.

Outside the America's Cup arena, Whidden has won the Newport-Bermuda Race (Class A) five times and has won his class at Miami SORC five times and twice overall. Additionally, he's had repeated wins on the European racing circuit, including the Palma Superyacht Regatta, Loro Piana Superyacht Regatta, Maxi Yacht Rolex Cup, Les Voiles de Saint-Tropez, St Barths Bucket Regatta, and the Trofeo Zegna Regatta. In 2001, he steered Gianni Agnelli's 92-foot yacht Stealth to victory over 200 competitors at the America's Cup Jubilee in Cowes, England.

Whidden is the publisher and co-author of two best-selling books: The Art & Science of Sails and Championship Tactics. He served as an overseer of Colby College and a trustee of the New York Yacht Club. In 2005, he was featured in an article titled CEO Sailing on Forbes.com.

Tom and his wife Betsy, co-founder of Connecticut Magazine, reside in Essex, Connecticut, New York City, and Newport, Rhode Island. They have one son, Avery, and one daughter, Holly Whidden.
