= North Sails =

International sailmaker company

- Type: Subsidiary
- Founded: 1957
- Founder: Lowell North
- Headquarters: Bridgeport, Connecticut, U.S.
- Key people: Tom Whidden, Ken Read
- Parent: North Technology Group
- Website: www.northsails.com

North Sails is an international sailmaker and sailing wear company with operations in 29 countries. The company designs, engineers and manufactures sails for racing and cruising sailboats from 8 feet (2.5m) to more-than 200 feet (60m) in length. Licensees manufacture clothing and windsurfing sails. North Sails is the world’s largest sailmaker, with annual sales of $150 million in 2011. Sails by North Sails are used by the majority of competitors in the Ocean Race and the America’s Cup.

== History ==
North Sails was founded in 1957 by Lowell North, in San Diego, California. An engineer by training, North applied a rigorous, methodical approach to designing sails, with the goal of building sails that were faster than the competition’s. North began testing the strength and stretch characteristics of sailcloth he received from his suppliers, to eliminate variability in his raw materials. He introduced computer-driven cloth cutting machines, to increase the consistency and repeatability of a sail design. North was a pioneer in computer modelling of sail forces and structural loads. North used a laminated Mylar and Dacron sail on the 12-metre Enterprise in 1977. North’s emphasis on computer technologies and new materials is reflected in the company today, which makes intensive use of computer assisted design and specialised finite element analysis (FEA) and Computational fluid dynamics (CFD) software, and which has introduced a number of innovations in materials and manufacturing processes.

In the 1960s and 1970s, North recruited expert sailors to help expand his business. Among his employees were such Olympic and international sailing champions as Hans Fogh, Peter Barrett, John Marshall, Tom Blackaller, Iain Macdonald-Smith and Robbie Haines.

North sold the company to Terry Kohler in 1984. In 1986, Kohler brought on renowned sailor and sailmaker Tom Whidden as president. Whidden went on to become CEO and co-owner. Together, Kohler and Whidden built the company into the world's dominant sailmaker with roughly 80% marketshare.

North Sails is an example of a vertically integrated company, with its North Cloth division producing woven and laminated sailcloth. North Sails is part of North Technology Group, a conglomerate of marine-industry companies that includes Southern Spars and EdgeWater Powerboats. Being closely associated with Southern Spars, a manufacturer of carbon fiber masts, allows North Sails to engineer an integrated spar and sail package.

In 2014, Oakley Capital Private Equity, a UK private equity firm founded by Peter Dubens acquired a majority stake in North Technology Group.

== Technology ==
North Sails introduced the 3DL line of upwind sails in 1992. In the 3DL manufacturing process, aramid or carbon fiber yarns and layers of polyester (PET) film are laid over a computer-controlled mold that is configured to assume the airfoil shape of the molded sail, and then thermo-formed to produce a laminated sail with the intended three-dimensional shape. North Sails manufactures 3DL sails in facilities in Minden, Nevada, and Sri Lanka.

In 2009, North Sails began using pre-impregnated tapes of carbon and UHMPE fibers on its full-sized articulating molds. When thermomolded, the layers of reinforcing material consolidate to form a seamless composite sail membrane, which the company markets as the 3Di product line.
