= Running in Heels =

2009 American reality television series

- Country of origin: United States
- No. of seasons: 1
- No. of episodes: 8

Production
- Executive producer: Ross Breitenbach
- Running time: 60 minutes (44 without commercials)

Original release
- Network: Style Network
- Release: March 1 – April 19, 2009

Running in Heels is a reality television show that follows three interns working at the New York office of fashion magazine Marie Claire. The series debuted on March 1, 2009 on the Style Network in United States and the United Kingdom and on E! in the United Kingdom, Canada, Asia and Australia. It was also shown in the United Kingdom on digital channel E4. In The Netherlands it airs on RTL 5. In Denmark it is shown on TV3. The show follows the lives of the Marie Claire staff as well as three new interns, Ashley Gosik, Samantha DeZur, and Talita Silva.
