= Horatio Nelson Young =

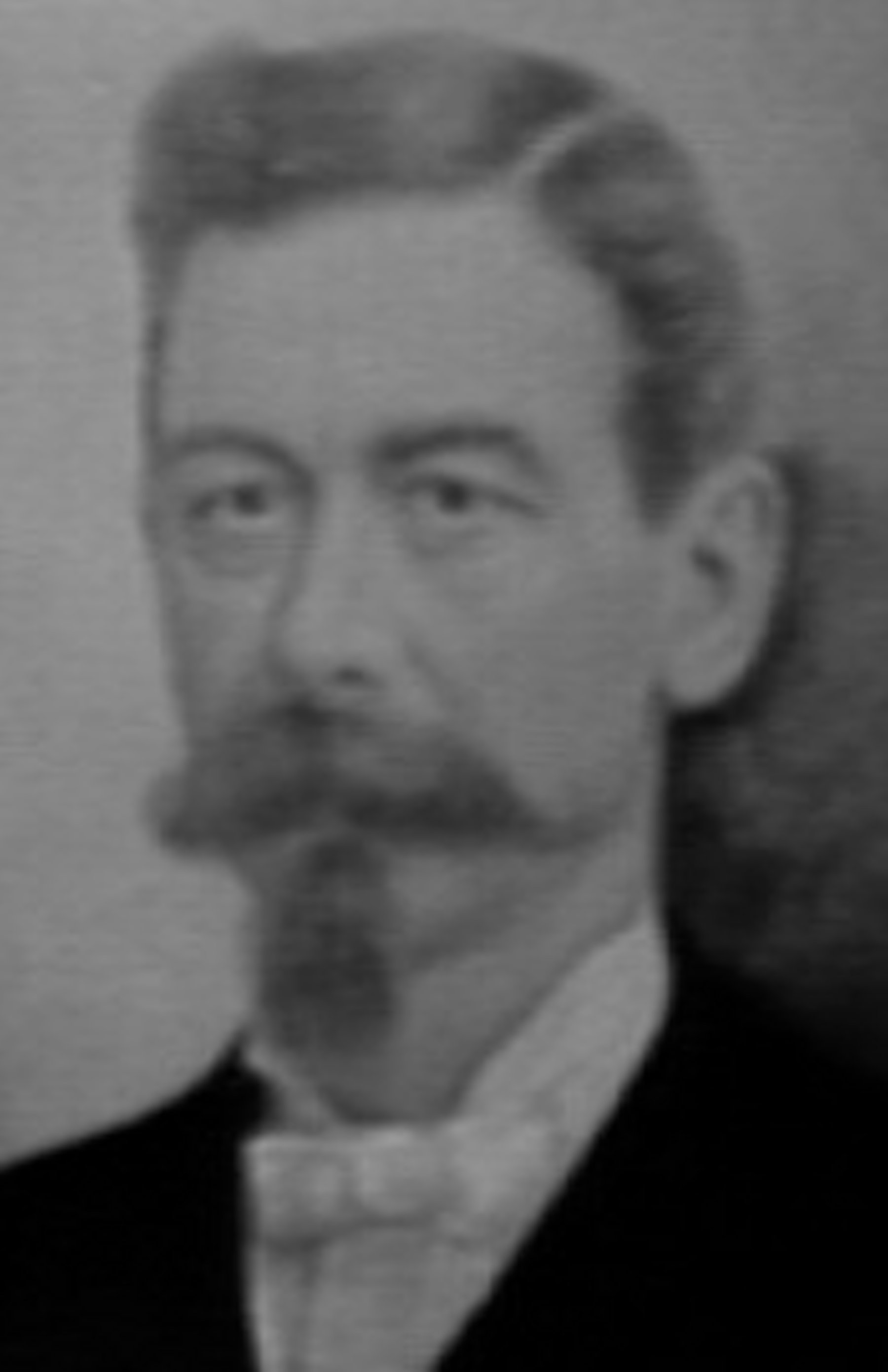
- Horatio Young, Medal of Honor recipient
- Born: July 19, 1845; Calais, Maine
- Died: July 3, 1913 (aged 67)
- Burial place: St. Stephen Rural Cemetery, New Brunswick, Canada
- Military career
- Allegiance: United States of America; Union
- Branch: United States Navy; Union Navy
- Rank: Seaman
- Units: USS Lehigh
- Conflicts: American Civil War
- Awards: Medal of Honor

Horatio Nelson Young (July 19, 1845 – July 3, 1913) was a United States Navy sailor who received the Medal of Honor for his actions on the USS Lehigh during the American Civil War.

== Biography ==
Young was born in Calais, Maine, a small United States-British North America border town. As a young man he lived in a place where crossing the bridge over the St. Croix River to St. Stephen, New Brunswick for employment, shopping, hospitalization, or just visiting friends, was an almost daily part of life.

Following the outbreak of the American Civil War, Young traveled to Boston, Massachusetts, where he joined the United States Navy. On November 16, 1863, the 18-year-old was serving aboard the USS Lehigh when the ship ran aground in Charleston Harbor. In rough waters and under heavy enemy fire, Young and two other sailors, Landsman Frank S. Gile and Landsman William Williams, succeeded in passing in a small boat from their ship to the USS Nahant with a line wrapped on a hawser that would enable the Lehigh to be freed from her position.

For this action, Young, Gile, and Williams each received the Medal of Honor, the United States' highest military decoration.

Young died in 1913 and was interred in the St. Stephen Rural Cemetery, in St. Stephen, New Brunswick, Canada, surrounded by other Canadian and American war dead.

== Medal of Honor citation ==
Rank and organization: Seaman, U.S. Navy. Born: July 19, 1845, Calais, Maine. G.O. No.: 32, April 16, 1864.

Citation:

On board the U.S.S. Lehigh, Charleston Harbor, 16 November 1863, during the hazardous task of freeing the Lehigh, which had grounded, and was under heavy enemy fire from Fort Moultrie. After several previous attempts had been made, Young succeeded in passing in a small boat from the Lehigh to the Nahant with a line bent on a hawser. This courageous action while under severe enemy fire enabled the Lehigh to be freed from her helpless position.

== See also ==
- List of American Civil War Medal of Honor recipients: T–Z
