= List of yacht clubs =

This is a list of yacht clubs across countries.

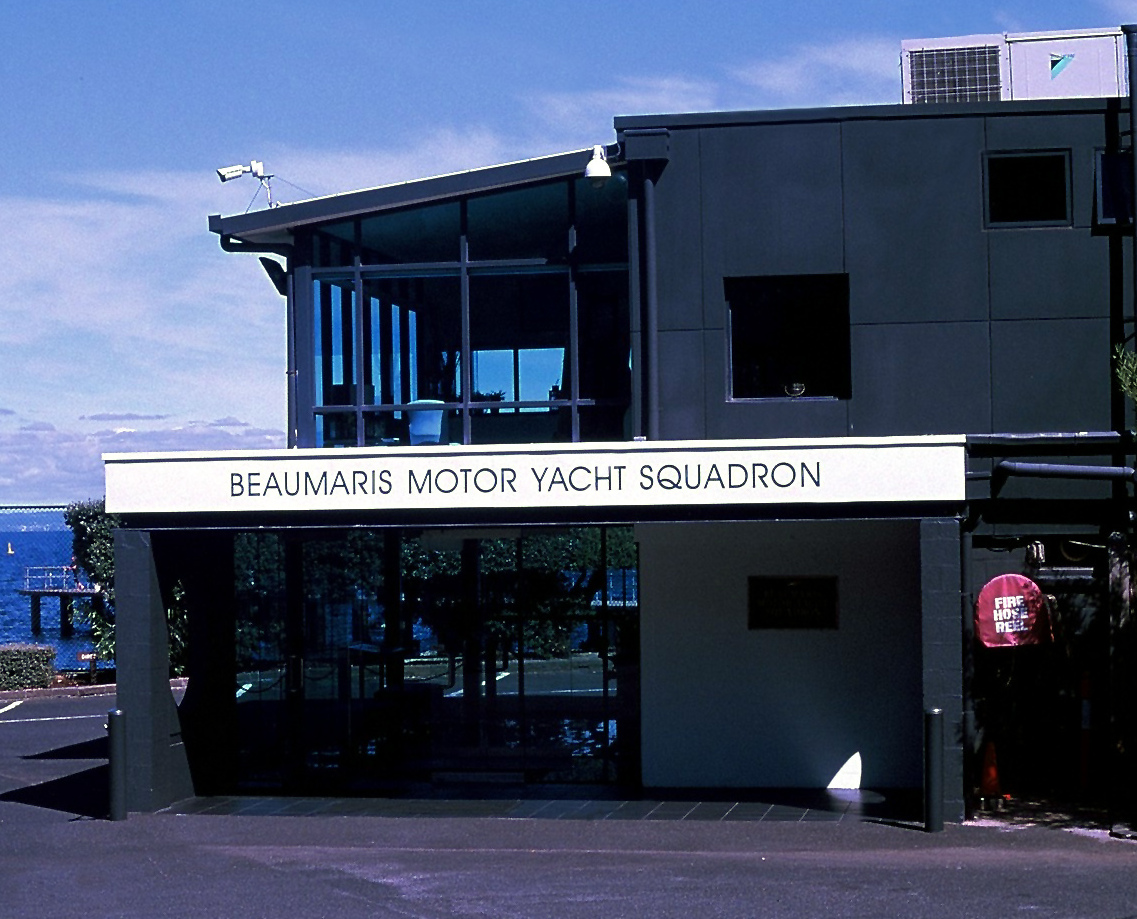
Beaumaris motor yacht squadron

== Yacht clubs ==
Name	Nation	City	Year
Club Nautique de Tipasa	Algeria	Tipasa	
Clube Náutico da Ilha de Luanda	Angola	Luanda	1924
Antigua Yacht Club	Antigua and Barbuda	English Harbour	
Club de Regatas San Nicolás	Argentina	San Nicolás de los Arroyos	1892
Club de Velas de Rosario	Argentina	Rosario	1963
Club Náutico Córdoba	Argentina	Villa Carlos Paz	1932
Club Náutico Mar del Plata	Argentina	Mar Del Plata	1925
Club Náutico Olivos	Argentina	Olivos	1927
Club Náutico San Isidro	Argentina	San Isidro, Buenos Aires	1910
Club Náutico San Pedro	Argentina	San Pedro, Buenos Aires	1907
Club Náutico Sudeste	Argentina	San Isidro, Buenos Aires	1935
Club Universitario de Buenos Aires	Argentina	Buenos Aires	1918
Yacht Club Argentino	Argentina	Buenos Aires	1883
Yacht Club Olivos	Argentina	Olivos	1927
Yacht Club Rosario	Argentina	Rosario	1941
Beaumaris Motor Yacht Squadron	Australia	Beaumaris, Victoria	1959
Black Rock Yacht Club	Australia	Black Rock, Victoria	1904
Bendigo Yacht Club	Australia	Eppalock	1962
Blairgowrie Yacht Squadron	Australia	Blairgowrie, Victoria	1952
Cruising Yacht Club of Australia	Australia	Sydney	1944
Cockle Bay Yacht Club	Australia	Sydney	2021
Fremantle Sailing Club	Australia	Fremantle	1897
Hobsons Bay Yacht Club	Australia	Williamstown, Victoria	1888
Metung Yacht Club	Australia	Metung, Victoria	1934
Mornington Yacht Club	Australia	Mornington	1945
Ocean Racing Club of Victoria	Australia	Albert Park, Victoria	1949
Queenscliff Cruising Yacht Club	Australia	Queenscliff, Victoria	1963
Queensland Cruising Yacht Club	Australia	Shorncliffe, Queensland	1948
Royal Brighton Yacht Club	Australia	Brighton, Victoria	1875
Royal Freshwater Bay Yacht Club	Australia	Perth	1896
Royal Geelong Yacht Club	Australia	Geelong, Victoria	1859
Royal Melbourne Yacht Squadron	Australia	Melbourne	1876
Royal Motor Yacht Club of New South Wales	Australia	Rose Bay	1905
Royal Perth Yacht Club	Australia	Perth	1841
Royal Port Pirie Yacht Club	Australia	Port Pirie, South Australia	1892
Royal Prince Alfred Yacht Club	Australia	Newport, New South Wales	1867
Royal Prince Edward Yacht Club	Australia	Sydney	1922
Royal Queensland Yacht Squadron	Australia	Manly, Queensland	1885
Royal Sydney Yacht Squadron	Australia	Sydney	1862
Royal Victorian Motor Yacht Club	Australia	Williamstown, Victoria	1904
Royal Yacht Club of Tasmania	Australia	River Derwent (Tasmania)	1880
Royal Yacht Club of Victoria	Australia	Williamstown, Victoria	1853
Sandringham Yacht Club	Australia	Melbourne	1903
Royal South Australian Yacht Squadron	Australia	North Haven, South Australia	1869
Southern Cross Yacht Club	Australia	Sydney	
Southport Yacht Club	Australia	Main Beach, Queensland	1946
Sun City Yacht Club	Australia	Two Rocks	
Baku Yacht Club	Azerbaijan	Baku	2004
Sea Breeze Marina Yacht Club	Azerbaijan	Baku	2025
Royal Nassau Sailing Club	Bahamas	Nassau	1924
Coral Harbour Yacht Club	Bahamas	Nassau	Closed
Barbados Yacht Club	Barbados	St. Michael	1924
Bruxelles Royal Yacht Club	Belgium	Brussels	1906
Royal Belgian Sailing Club	Belgium	Ghent	1863
Royal North Sea Yacht Club	Belgium	Ostend	1946
Royal Yacht Club van België	Belgium	Antwerp	1851
Royal Bermuda Yacht Club	Bermuda	Hamilton, Bermuda	1844
Royal Hamilton Amateur Dinghy Club	Bermuda	Hamilton, Bermuda	1882
Gaborone Yacht Club	Botswana		
Cabanga Iate Clube de Pernambuco	Brazil		
Clube de Regatas Guanabara	Brazil		
Clube dos Jangadeiros	Brazil		
Clube Internacional de Regatas	Brazil		
Iate Clube de Aracaju	Brazil		
Iate Clube de Guaratuba	Brazil		
Iate Clube de Santos	Brazil		
Iate Clube do Espírito Santo	Brazil		
Iate Clube do Rio de Janeiro	Brazil		
Rio Yacht Club	Brazil		
Veleiros do Sul	Brazil		
Yacht Clube da Bahía	Brazil		
Yacht Club Paulista	Brazil		
Yacht Club Santo Amaro	Brazil		
Royal British Virgin Islands Yacht Club	British Virgin Islands	Road Town	1973
Armdale Yacht Club	Canada	Halifax, Nova Scotia	1947
Bay of Quinte Yacht Club	Canada	Belleville, Ontario	1876
Barrachois Harbour Yacht Club	Canada	Barrachois Harbour, Nova Scotia	1996
Ben Eoin Yacht Club	Canada	Ben Eoin, Nova Scotia	2013
Bras d'Or Yacht Club	Canada	Baddeck, Nova Scotia	1904
Britannia Yacht Club	Canada	Ottawa, Ontario	1887
Buffalo Canoe Club	Canada	Fort Erie, Ontario	1882
Burrard Yacht Club	Canada	North Vancouver, BC	1933
Calgary Yacht Club	Canada	Chestermere, Alberta	1933
Charlottetown Yacht Club	Canada	Charlottetown, Prince Edward Island	1922
Dartmouth Yacht Club	Canada	Dartmouth, Nova Scotia	1962
Dobson Yacht Club	Canada	Westmount, Nova Scotia	1953
Erieau Yacht Club	Canada	Erieau, Ontario	1932
Etobicoke Yacht Club	Canada	Toronto, Ontario	1967
Gatineau River Yacht Club	Canada	Chelsea, Quebec	1960
Island Yacht Club	Canada	Toronto, Ontario	1951
Kingston Yacht Club	Canada	Kingston, Ontario	1896
Queen City Yacht Club (Toronto)	Canada	Toronto, Ontario	1889
Rondeau Yacht Club	Canada	Chatham-Kent, Ontario	1932
Royal Canadian Yacht Club	Canada	Toronto, Ontario	1852
Royal Cape Breton Yacht Club	Canada	Sydney, Nova Scotia	1899
Royal Hamilton Yacht Club	Canada	Hamilton, Ontario	1888
Royal Kennebeccasis Yacht Club	Canada	Millidgeville, New Brunswick	1898
Royal Lake of the Woods Yacht Club	Canada	Ontario	1903
Royal Nova Scotia Yacht Squadron	Canada	Halifax, Nova Scotia	1837
Royal St. Lawrence Yacht Club	Canada	Dorval, Quebec	1888
Royal Vancouver Yacht Club	Canada	Vancouver, British Columbia	1903
Royal Victoria Yacht Club	Canada	Victoria, British Columbia	1892
Royal Western Nova Scotia Yacht Club	Canada	Digby, Nova Scotia	1898
Royal Newfoundland Yacht Club	Canada	Manuels, Newfoundland	1936
Saltspring Island Sailing Club	Canada	Salt Spring Island	1969
Secret Cove Yacht Club	Canada	British Columbia	1981
Wallace MacAskill Yacht Club	Canada	St. Peter's, Nova Scotia	1998
Yacht Club de Québec	Canada	Québec	
Club de Yates de Algarrobo	Chile	Algarrobo	1945
Club de Yates Higuerillas	Chile	Concón	1955
Cofradía Náutica del Pacifico Austral	Chile	Algarrobo	1968
Yacht Club de Chile	Chile	Viña del Mar	1955
Qingdao International Yacht Club	China	Qingdao	2005
Club Naval Santa Cruz de Castillogrande	Colombia		
Jedriličarski klub Vega	Croatia	Pula	1886
Havana Yacht Club	Cuba	Havana	
Cyprus International Sailing Club	Cyprus	Limassol	2018
Limassol Nautical Club	Cyprus	Limassol	
Yacht Club Doksy	Czech Republic	Doksy	1927
Aarhus Sejlklub	Denmark	Aarhus	1880
Egå Sejlklub	Denmark	Egå	
Fredericia Sejlklub	Denmark	Fredericia	
Gråsten Sejlklub	Denmark	Gråsten	
Haderslev Sejl-Club	Denmark	Haderslev	
Hellerup Sejlklub	Denmark	Hellerup	
Kerteminde Sejlklub	Denmark	Kerteminde	
Kjøbenhavns Amatør-Sejlklub	Denmark	Copenhagen	
Kolding Sejlklub	Denmark	Kolding	
Kongelig Dansk Yachtklub	Denmark		
Middelfart Sejlklub	Denmark		
Roskilde Sejlklub	Denmark	Roskilde	
Royal Danish Yacht Club	Denmark	Copenhagen	1866
Skovshoved Sejlklub	Denmark	Charlottenlund	
Skælskør Amatør Sejlklub	Denmark	Skælskør	
Skovshoved Sejlklub	Denmark		
Taarbæk Sejlklub	Denmark	Taarbæk	
Thisted Sejlklub	Denmark	Thisted	
Casa de Campo Yacht Club	Dominican Republic		
Salinas Yacht Club	Ecuador	Salinas	
Monte Real Club de Yates de Bayona	Spain	Bayona	1965
Real Club Astur de Regatas	Spain	Gijón	1911
Real Club de Regatas de Alicante	Spain	Alicante	1889
Real Club de Regatas de Cartagena	Spain		
Real Club de Regatas de Galicia	Spain	Vilagarcía de Arousa	1902
Real Club de Regatas de Santiago de la Ribera	Spain		
Real Club Marítimo de Barcelona	Spain		
Real Club Marítimo de Melilla	Spain		
Real Club Marítimo de Santander	Spain	Santander	1927
Real Club Marítimo del Abra- Real Sporting Club	Spain	Las Arenas	1898
Real Club Mediterráneo	Spain	Málaga	1873
Club de Mar de Almería	Spain		
Club de Mar - Mallorca	Spain	Palma, Mallorca	
Club de Vela de Blanes	Spain	Blanes, Catalonia	
Club Marítimo de Mahón	Spain		
Club Marítimo San Antonio de la Playa	Spain		
Club Náutico de Cambrils	Spain	Cambrils, Catalonia	
Club Náutico de Ciudadela	Spain	Ciutadella de Menorca	1923
Club Náutico de Garraf	Spain	Port Garraf, Barcelona	
Club Nautico de Moraira	Spain		
Club Náutico de San Antonio Abad	Spain	Sant Antoni De Portmany, Ibiza	
Club Náutico El Arenal	Spain	Llucmajor, Mallorca	
Club Náutico Sevilla	Spain	Seville, Andalusia	
Club Náutico Vilanova	Spain	Vilanova I La Geltru, Barcelona	1957
Monte Real Club de Yates de Bayona	Spain		
Real Club Náutico de Arrecife	Spain		
Real Club Náutico de Barcelona	Spain	Barcelona	1876
Real Club Nautico de Calpe	Spain		
Real Club Nautico de Castellón	Spain		
Real Club Nautico de Denia	Spain		
Real Club Náutico de Gran Canaria	Spain	Las Palmas	1908
Real Club Náutico de La Coruña	Spain	Corunna	1926
Real Club Náutico de Laredo	Spain	Laredo, Cantabria	1945
Real Club Náutico de Madrid	Spain		
Real Club Náutico de Motril	Spain		
Real Club Náutico de Palma	Spain	Palma de Mallorca	1948
Real Club Náutico de San Sebastián	Spain	San Sebastián	1896
Real Club Náutico de Sangenjo	Spain		
Real Club Náutico de Tenerife	Spain	Santa Cruz de Tenerife	1902
Real Club Nautico de Torrevieja	Spain		
Real Club Náutico de Valencia	Spain	Pinedo	1903
Real Club Náutico de Vigo	Spain	Vigo	1926
Real Club Náutico Puerto de Pollensa	Spain	Pollença	1961
Royal Tarragona Yacht Club	Spain	Tarragona	1878
Kalev Yacht Club	Estonia		
Cercle de la Voile d'Arcachon	France		
Cercle de la Voile de Paris	France	Paris	1858
Cercle de Voile du Bois de la Chaize	France	Noirmoutier	1908
Gustavia Yacht Club	France	Gustavia, Saint Barthélemy	2016
International Yacht Club de Hyères	France	Hyères	
Società Triestina della Vela	France		
Société des Régates de Brest	France	Brest, France	1847
Société des Régates de Courseulles	France	Courseulles-sur-Mer, France	
Société des Régates du Havre	France	Le Havre	1838
Société des Régates Rochelaises	France	La Rochelle	1860
Société Nautique de Marseille	France	Marseille	1887
Société Nautique de Saint-Tropez	France	Saint-Tropez	
Union Nationale pour la Course au Large	France	Boulogne-sur-Seine	1971
Yacht Club Classique	France	La Rochelle	2005
Yacht Club de France	France	Paris	1867
Yacht Club de Sète	France	Sète	1863
Royal Suva Yacht Club	Fiji	Suva, Fiji	1932
Espoo Yacht Club	Finland		
Gamlakarleby Segelförening / GSF	Finland		
Helsingfors Segelklubb / HSK	Finland	Helsinki	1899
Helsingfors Segelsällskap / HSS	Finland	Helsinki	1893
Nyländska Jaktklubben / NJK	Finland	Helsinki	1861
Segelföreningen i Björneborg / BSF	Finland	Pori	1856
St. Lucia Yacht Club / STL	Saint Lucia	St. Lucia Yacht Club	1966
Bembridge Sailing Club	United Kingdom	Bembridge, Isle of Wight	1886
Bewl Valley Sailing Club	United Kingdom	Tunbridge Wells, Kent	
Cargreen Yacht Club	United Kingdom	Cargreen	1972
Cowes Corinthian Yacht Club	United Kingdom	Cowes, Isle of Wight	1952
Greenwich Yacht Club	United Kingdom	London	1908
Guernsey Yacht Club	United Kingdom	Saint Peter Port, Guernsey	1890
House of Commons Yacht Club	United Kingdom	London	1953
House of Lords Yacht Club	United Kingdom	London	1949
Island Sailing Club	United Kingdom	Cowes, Isle of Wight	1889
Itchenor Sailing Club	United Kingdom	Itchenor	1927
Junior Offshore Group	United Kingdom	Cowes, Isle of Wight	
Little Ship Club	United Kingdom	London	1926
Lowestoft Cruising Club	United Kingdom	Lowestoft	1965
Merthyr Tydfil Sailing Club	United Kingdom	Merthyr Tydfil	1967
Midland Sailing Club	United Kingdom	Birmingham	1894
Mylor Yacht Club	United Kingdom	Mylor	1963
Netley Cliff Sailing Club	United Kingdom	Southampton	
New Quay Yacht Club	United Kingdom	New Quay, Wales	1951
Parkstone Yacht Club	United Kingdom	Poole, England	1895
Penzance Sailing Club	United Kingdom	Penzance	1939
Port Navas Yacht Club	United Kingdom	Porth Navas	1958
Pwllheli Sailing Club	United Kingdom	Pwllheli, Wales	1958
Richmond Yacht Club, Twickenham	United Kingdom	London	1962
Royal Air Force Yacht Club	United Kingdom	Hamble-le-Rice	1932
Royal Anglesey Yacht Club	United Kingdom	Beaumaris, Wales	1802
Royal Armoured Corps Yacht Club	United Kingdom	London	1949
Royal Artillery Yacht Club	United Kingdom	London	1933
Royal Burnham Yacht Club	United Kingdom	Burnham-on-Crouch	1895
Royal Channel Islands Yacht Club	United Kingdom	Saint Peter Port, Guernsey	1862
Royal Cinque Port Yacht Club	United Kingdom	Dover	1872
Royal Clyde Yacht Club	United Kingdom	Argyll and Bute, Scotland	1824
Royal Corinthian Yacht Club	United Kingdom	Burnham-on-Crouch	1872
Royal Cornwall Yacht Club	United Kingdom	Falmouth, Cornwall	1871
Royal Corps of Signals Yacht Club	United Kingdom	Gosport	
Royal Cruising Club	United Kingdom	London	1880
Royal Dart Yacht Club	United Kingdom	Kingswear	1866
Royal Dee Yacht Club	United Kingdom	Flintshire, Wales	1815
Royal Dorset Yacht Club	United Kingdom	Weymouth, Dorset	1875
Royal Engineers Yacht Club	United Kingdom	Gosport	1846
Royal Findhorn Yacht Club	United Kingdom	Findhorn, Scotland	1929
Royal Forth Yacht Club	United Kingdom	Edinburgh, Scotland	1868
Royal Fowey Yacht Club	United Kingdom	Fowey	1890
Royal Gourock Yacht Club	United Kingdom	Gourock, Scotland	1894
Royal Harwich Yacht Club	United Kingdom	Ipswich	1843
Royal Highland Yacht Club	United Kingdom	Oban, Scotland	1881
Royal Lymington Yacht Club	United Kingdom	Lymington	1922
Royal London Yacht Club	United Kingdom	Cowes, Isle of Wight	1838
Royal Motor Yacht Club	United Kingdom	Sandbanks	1905
Royal Naval Club and Royal Albert Club	United Kingdom	Portsmouth	1864–2021
Royal Naval Sailing Association	United Kingdom	Gosport	1935
Royal Norfolk and Suffolk Yacht Club	United Kingdom	Lowestoft	1859
Royal Northern and Clyde Yacht Club	United Kingdom	Rothesay, Scotland	1872
Royal North of Ireland Yacht Club	United Kingdom	Cultra, Northern Ireland	1899
Royal Northumberland Yacht Club	United Kingdom	Blyth, Northumberland	1890
Royal Ocean Racing Club	United Kingdom	London	1925
Royal Plymouth Corinthian Yacht Club	United Kingdom	Plymouth	1877
Royal Scottish Motor Yacht Club	United Kingdom	Wemyss Bay, Scotland	1919
Royal Solent Yacht Club	United Kingdom	Yarmouth, Isle of Wight	1878
Royal Southern Yacht Club	United Kingdom	Hamble-le-Rice	1837
Royal Southampton Yacht Club	United Kingdom	Southampton	1858
Royal Tay Yacht Club	United Kingdom	Dundee, Scotland	1885
Royal Temple Yacht Club	United Kingdom	Ramsgate	1857
Royal Thames Yacht Club	United Kingdom	London	1775
Royal Torbay Yacht Club	United Kingdom	Torbay	1863
Royal Ulster Yacht Club	United Kingdom	Bangor, County Down	1866
Royal Victoria Yacht Club (England)	United Kingdom	Fishbourne, Isle of Wight	1845
Royal Welsh Yacht Club	United Kingdom	Caernarfon, Wales	1847
Royal Western Yacht Club of England	United Kingdom	Plymouth	1827
Royal Western Yacht Club	United Kingdom	Paisley, Renfrewshire, Scotland	1875
Royal Windermere Yacht Club	United Kingdom	Bowness-on-Windermere	1860
Royal Yacht Squadron	United Kingdom	Cowes, Isle of Wight	1815
Royal Yorkshire Yacht Club	United Kingdom	Bridlington	1847
Seadog Owners Association	United Kingdom	Cargreen	1975
Sea View Yacht Club	United Kingdom	Seaview, Isle of Wight	1893
St Helier Yacht Club	United Kingdom	St Helier, Jersey	1903
St Mawes Sailing Club	United Kingdom	St Mawes	1920
Starcross Yacht Club	United Kingdom	Starcross	
Sussex Motor Yacht Club	United Kingdom	Brighton, Sussex	1907
Thames Motor Yacht Club	United Kingdom	Hampton Court, Surrey	1930
Trearddur Bay Sailing Club	United Kingdom	Trearddur, Wales	1919
Alster-Piraten-Club	Germany	Hamburg	1898
Blankeneser Segel-Club	Germany	Hamburg	1898
Deutsch-Britischer Yacht Club	Germany	Berlin	1947
Deutscher Challenger Yacht Club	Germany	Starnberg	
Flensburger Segel-Club	Germany	Flensburg	1890
Hamburger Segel-Club	Germany	Hamburg	1927
Kieler Yacht-Club	Germany	Kiel	1887
Lübecker Yacht-Club	Germany	Lübeck	1920
Marine-Regatta-Verein	Germany	Kiel	1887
Norddeutscher Regatta Verein	Germany	Hamburg	1868
Schlei-Segel-Club	Germany	Schleswig	
Segelclub Eckernförde	Germany	Eckernförde	
Segelclub Rhe	Germany	Hamburg	1855
Segelkameradschaft "Das Wappen von Bremen"	Germany	Bremen	1934
Seglervereinigung 1903 Berlin	Germany	Berlin	
Spandauer Yacht-Club	Germany	Berlin, Germany	
Stettiner Yacht Club	Germany	Lübeck	1877
Verein Seglerhaus am Wannsee	Germany	Berlin	1867
Württembergischer Yacht-Club	Germany	Friedrichshafen	1911
Royal Gibraltar Yacht Club	Gibraltar	Gibraltar Harbour	1829
Nautical Club of Thessaloniki	Greece		1931
NC Vouliagmeni	Greece		1937
Hebe Haven Yacht Club	Hong Kong		1963
Royal Hong Kong Yacht Club	Hong Kong	Kellett Island	1890
Balatonfüredi Yacht Club	Hungary	Balatonfüred	1867
Cochin Yacht Club	India	Kochi, Kerala	1982
Naini Tal Yacht Club	India	Nainital, Kumaon	1910
Royal Bombay Yacht Club	India	Mumbai, Maharashtra	1846
Royal Madras Yacht Club	India	Chennai, Tamil Nadu	1911
National Yacht Club	Ireland	Dún Laoghaire	1971
Lough Derg Yacht Club	Ireland	Dromineer	1835
Lough Ree Yacht Club	Ireland	Ballglass	1770
Royal Cork Yacht Club	Ireland	Cork	1720
Royal Irish Yacht Club	Ireland	Dún Laoghaire	1831
Royal St. George Yacht Club	Ireland	Dún Laoghaire	1838
Royal Western Yacht Club of Ireland	Ireland	Kilrush, Co Clare	1827<
Strangford Lough Yacht Club	Ireland	Newtownards	1936
Waterford Harbour Sailing Club	Ireland	Dunmore East	1934
Circolo della Vela Sicilia	Italy	Palermo	1933
Circolo Nautico e della Vela Argentario	Italy	Porto Ercole	1974
Circolo Vela Gargnano	Italy	Gargnano	1950
Circolo Vela Torbole	Italy	Lake Garda	1964
Club Nautico di Roma	Italy	Rome	2006
Compagnia della Vela	Italy	Venice	1911
Reale Yacht Club Canottieri Savoia	Italy	Naples	1893
Yacht Club Adriaco	Italy	Trieste	1903
Yacht Club Italiano	Italy	Genoa	1879
Yacht Club Punta Ala	Italy	Punta Ala	1976
Yacht Club Santo Stefano	Italy	Porto Santo Stefano	1960
Sociétà Velica di Barcola e Grignano	Italy	Trieste	1968
Yacht Club Costa Smeralda	Italy	Costa Smeralda	1967
Yacht Club Sanremo	Italy	Sanremo	1920
Yacht Club Santo Stefano	Italy	Porto Santo Stefano	1960
Brokey Yacht Club	Iceland	Reykjavík	1971
Carmel Sailing Community	Israel	Haifa	2014
Royal Jamaica Yacht Club	Jamaica	Kingston	1889
Kansai Yacht Club	Japan		
The Kobe Yacht Club	Japan	Kobe, Hyogo, Japan	1890
Nippon Ocean Racing Club	Japan	Tokyo	
Nippon Yacht Club	Japan	Tokyo	
Beirut Yacht Club	Lebanon	Beirut	1954
Lebanese Yacht Club	Lebanon	Beirut	1951
Libyan Yacht Club	Libya	Tripoli	2015
Club Náutico Avándaro	Mexico		
Yacht Club de Monaco	Monaco	Monaco	1953
Royal Malta Yacht Club	Malta	Ta' Xbiex	1835
Royal Langkawi Yacht Club	Malaysia	Langkawi, Malaysia	1996
Royal Selangor Yacht Club	Malaysia	Port Klang	1963
Koninklijke Nederlandsche Motorboot Club	Netherlands	Leerdam	1907
Koninklijke Roei- en Zeilvereniging De Maas	Netherlands	Rotterdam	1851
Koninklijke Watersportvereniging De Kaag	Netherlands	Warmond	1910
Koninklijke Nederlandsche Zeil- & Roeivereeniging	Netherlands	Muiden & Enkhuizen	1847
Koninklijke Zeil- & Roeivereniging Hollandia	Netherlands	Medemblik	1881
Lagos Yacht Club	Niger		
Åsgårdstrand Seilforening	Norway		
Bærum Seilforening	Norway		
Bergens Seilforening	Norway		
Hankø Yacht Club	Norway	Hankø	
Royal Norwegian Yacht Club	Norway	Oslo	1883
Maioro Yacht Club	New Zealand	Maioro, Auckland	2018
Mercury Bay Boating Club	New Zealand	Whitianga	
Richmond Yacht Club, Auckland	New Zealand	Auckland	1905
Royal Akarana Yacht Club	New Zealand	Auckland	1895
Royal New Zealand Yacht Squadron	New Zealand	Auckland	1871
Royal Port Nicholson Yacht Club	New Zealand	Wellington	1883
Tutukaka South Pacific Yacht Club	New Zealand	Tutukaka	
Club de Regatas Lima	Peru		1875
Manila Yacht Club	Philippines	Manila	1927
Royal Papua Yacht Club	Papua New Guinea	Port Moresby	1921
Poznański Klub Morski	Poland	Poznań	1936
Yacht Klubu Polski	Poland	Warsaw	1924
Associação Naval de Lisboa	Portugal	Lisbon	1856
Clube Naval de Lisboa	Portugal	Lisbon	1892
Clube Naval de Ponta Delgada	Portugal	Ponta Delgada	1902
Clube Naval de Sesimbra	Portugal	Sesimbra	1930
Clube Naval de Cascais	Portugal		1938
Club Náutico de San Juan	Puerto Rico	San Juan	
Algoa Bay Yacht Club	South Africa	Port Elizabeth	1959
Imperial Yacht Club	South Africa	Muizenberg	1906
Knysna Yacht Club	South Africa	Knysna	1910
Mossel Bay Yacht and Boat Club	South Africa	Mossel Bay	1956
Redhouse Yacht Club	South Africa	Redhouse, Eastern Cape	1904
Royal Cape Yacht Club	South Africa	Cape Town	1906
Royal Natal Yacht Club	South Africa	Durban	1858
Nevskiy flot	Russia	Saint Petersburg	1718
St. Petersburg River Yacht Club	Russia	Petrovsky Island	1860
Changi Sailing Club	Singapore		1936
Republic of Singapore Yacht Club	Singapore		1826
Club Nautique de Morges	Switzerland	Morges	
Société Nautique de Genève	Switzerland	Geneva	1872
Gamla Stans Yacht Sällskap	Sweden	Stockholm	
Lommabuktens Seglarklubb	Sweden	Lomma	1946
Royal Gothenburg Yacht Club / GKSS	Sweden	Gothenburg	1860
Royal Swedish Yacht Club / KSSS	Sweden	Stockholm	1830
Stenungsbaden Yacht Club	Sweden	Stenungsund, Sweden	
Sölvesborgs Segelsällskap	Sweden	Sölvesborg	
Royal Varuna Yacht Club	Thailand	Pattaya	1957
International Offshore Yacht Club	Turkey	Istanbul	2022
Istanbul Sailing Club	Turkey	Istanbul	1952
Karadeniz Yachting	Turkey	Trabzon	
Marmaris International Yacht Club	Turkey	Marmaris, Muğla	
Turkish Offshore Racing Club of Istanbul	Turkey	Istanbul	
Yacht Club Punta del Este	Uruguay	Punta del Este	1924
Yacht Club Uruguayo	Uruguay	Montevideo	1906
Alamitos Bay Yacht Club	United States		1924
American Legion Yacht Club	United States	Newport Beach, California	1966
American Yacht Club (Massachusetts)	United States	Newburyport, Massachusetts	1885
American Yacht Club (New York)	United States	Rye, New York	1883
Annapolis Yacht Club	United States	Annapolis, Maryland	1883
Atlanta Yacht Club	United States	Acworth, Georgia	1950
Austin Yacht Club	United States	Austin, Texas	1951
Balboa Yacht Club	United States	Corona del Mar, Newport Beach, California	1922
Barrington Yacht Club	United States	Barrington, Rhode Island	
Bellport Bay Yacht Club	United States	Bellport, New York	1906
Biscayne Bay Yacht Club	United States	Coconut Grove, Miami, Florida	1887
Boothbay Harbor Yacht Club	United States	Boothbay Harbor, Maine	1895
Boston Yacht Club	United States	Marblehead, Massachusetts	1866
Buffalo Yacht Club	United States	Buffalo, New York	1860
Burnham Park Yacht Club	United States	Chicago, Illinois	1938
Canandaigua Yacht Club	United States	Canandaigua, New York	1891
Capital Yacht Club	United States	Washington DC	1892
Cedar Point Yacht Club	United States	Westport, Connecticut	1887
Chautauqua Lake Yacht Club	United States	Lakewood, New York	1894
Chesapeake Yacht Club	United States	Shady Side, Maryland	1947
Chicago Corinthian Yacht Club	United States	Chicago, Illinois	1934
Chicago Yacht Club	United States	Chicago, Illinois	1875
Clearwater Yacht Club	United States	Clearwater, Florida	1911
Coconut Grove Sailing Club	United States	Coconut Grove, Miami, Florida	1946
Columbia Yacht Club	United States	Chicago, Illinois	1892
Corpus Christi Yacht Club	United States	Corpus Christi, Texas	1923
Coral Reef Yacht Club	United States		
Cottage Park Yacht Club	United States	Winthrop, Massachusetts	1902
Cowan Lake Sailing Association	United States	Cowan Lake State Park in Clinton County, Ohio	1954
Crescent Sail Yacht Club	United States		1933
Dallas Corinthian Yacht Club	United States	Oak Point, Texas	1928
Deadman's Flat Yacht Club	United States	Bexley, OH	2006
Des Plaines Park District Yacht Club	United States	Des Plaines, Illinois	1962
Detroit Boat Club	United States	Detroit, Michigan	1839
Detroit Yacht Club	United States	Detroit, Michigan	1868
Eastern Yacht Club	United States	Marblehead, Massachusetts	1870
Eau Gallie Yacht Club	United States	Eau Gallie, Florida	1907
Edgartown Yacht Club	United States	Edgartown, Massachusetts	1905
Edgewood Yacht Club	United States	Cranston, Rhode Island	1889
Encinal Yacht Club	United States	Alameda, California	1890
Eugene Yacht Club	United States	Eugene, Oregon	1940
Fort Worth Boat Club	United States	Fort Worth, Texas	1931
Golden Gate Yacht Club	United States	San Francisco, California	1939
Grand Rapids Yacht Club	United States	East Grand Rapids, Michigan	1931
Grosse Pointe Yacht Club	United States	Grosse Pointe Shores, Michigan	1914
Harlem Yacht Club	United States	City Island, New York	1883
Herring Bay Yacht Club	United States	Rose Haven, Maryland	1990
Hoover Sailing Club	United States	Columbus, Ohio	1962
Horseshoe Harbor Yacht Club	United States	Larchmont, New York	1890
Huntington Yacht Club	United States	Huntington, New York	1894
Ida Lewis Yacht Club	United States	Newport, Rhode Island	1928
Indianapolis Sailing Club	United States	Indianapolis, Indiana	1955
Indian Harbor Yacht Club	United States	Greenwich, Connecticut	1889
Island Bay Yacht Club	United States		
Jackson Park Yacht Club	United States	Chicago, Illinois	1896
Jeffries Yacht Club	United States	Boston, Massachusetts	1876
Kenosha Yacht Club	United States	Kenosha, Wisconsin	1912
Key Biscayne Yacht Club	United States		
Lake Beulah Yacht Club	United States		
Lake Charles Yacht Club	United States	Lake Charles, Louisiana	1964
Lake Hopatcong Yacht Club	United States	Mount Arlington, New Jersey	1905
Lake Lanier Sailing Club	United States		
Lake Merritt Sailing Club	United States		
Lake Mohawk Yacht Club	United States	Sparta Township, New Jersey	1938
Lake Shore Sail Club	United States	St. Clair Shores, Michigan	
Larchmont Yacht Club	United States	Larchmont, New York	1880
Lauderdale Yacht Club	United States	Fort Lauderdale, Florida	1938
Long Beach Yacht Club, Mississippi	United States	Long Beach, Mississippi	1980
Long Beach Yacht Club, California	United States	Long Beach, California	1929
Los Angeles Yacht Club	United States	San Pedro, Los Angeles	1901
Ludington Yacht Club	United States	Ludington, Michigan	1958
Melbourne Yacht Club	United States	Melbourne, Florida	1917
Miami Yacht Club	United States		
Mission Bay Yacht Club	United States	San Diego, California	1927
Manhasset Bay Yacht Club	United States	Port Washington, New York	1891
Mantoloking Yacht Club	United States	Mantoloking, New Jersey	1907
Milford Yacht Club	United States	Connecticut	1903
Milwaukee Yacht Club	United States	Milwaukee, Wisconsin	1871
Multnomah Channel Yacht Club	United States	Oregon	1961
Neenah Nodaway Yacht Club	United States	Wisconsin	1864
New York Yacht Club	United States	New York City	1844
Newport Harbor Yacht Club	United States	Newport Beach, California	1916
Noroton Yacht Club	United States	Darien, Connecticut	1928
Olcott Yacht Club	United States	Olcott, New York	1920
Old Greenwich Yacht Club	United States	Old Greenwich, Connecticut	1943
Oro Bay Yacht Club	United States	Anderson Island, Washington	1970
Pine Orchard Yacht and Country Club	United States	Branford, Connecticut	1901
Port Canaveral Yacht Club	United States	Cape Canaveral, Florida	1977
Portland Yacht Club	United States	Falmouth, Maine	1868
Put-in-Bay Yacht Club	United States	Put-in-Bay, Ohio	1886
Quassapaug Sailing Center	United States	Middlebury, Connecticut	
Queen City Yacht Club, Seattle	United States	Seattle, Washington	1916
Richmond Yacht Club, California	United States	Point Richmond, Richmond, California	1932
Riverside Yacht Club	United States	Riverside, Connecticut	1888
Rochester Yacht Club	United States	Rochester, New York	1877
Rock Hall Yacht Club	United States	Rock Hall, Maryland	1937
Sagamore Yacht Club	United States	Oyster Bay, New York	1944
San Diego Yacht Club	United States	San Diego, California	1886
San Francisco Yacht Club	United States	Belvedere Tiburon, California	1869
Savannah Yacht Club	United States	Savannah, Georgia	1869
Seattle Yacht Club	United States	Seattle, Washington	1892
Sea Cliff Yacht Club	United States	Sea Cliff, New York	1892
Severn Sailing Association	United States		
Sequoia Yacht Club	United States	Redwood City, California	1939
Shattemuc Yacht Club (New York)	United States	Ossining, New York	1884
Sheldrake Yacht Club (Mamaroneck, New York)	United States	Mamaroneck, New York	1909
Seawanhaka Corinthian Yacht Club	United States	Oyster Bay, New York	
South Bay Yacht Club	United States	Alviso, California	1896
South Lake Tahoe Yacht Club	United States	South Lake Tahoe, California	1978
Southwestern Yacht Club, Texas	United States		1920s to 1950
Southwestern Yacht Club, California	United States		
Southern Yacht Club	United States	New Orleans, Louisiana	1849
Southport Yacht Club	United States	Southport, Maine	1923
South Shore Yacht Club	United States	Bay View, Milwaukee, Wisconsin	1913
St. Petersburg Yacht Club	United States		
St. Francis Yacht Club	United States	San Francisco, California	1927
Texas Corinthian Yacht Club	United States	Kemah, Texas	1937
Toledo Yacht Club	United States	Toledo, Ohio	1865
Ventura Yacht Club	United States	Ventura, California	1938
Waikiki Yacht Club	United States	Honolulu, Hawaii	1944
Walnut Valley Sailing Club	United States	El Dorado Lake, Kansas	1937
Waukegan Yacht Club	United States	Waukegan, Illinois	1927
Westlake Yacht Club	United States	Westlake Village, California	1969
West River Sailing Club	United States		
Wichita Sailing Club	United States		
Wichita Falls Sailing Club	United States	Henrietta, Texas	1935
Winchester Boat Club	United States	Winchester, Massachusetts	1900s
Wiscasset Yacht Club	United States	Wiscasset, Maine	1952
White River Yacht Club	United States	Indianapolis, Indiana	1938
Yale Corinthian Yacht Club	United States	Short Beach, Connecticut	1881

== See also ==
- List of yacht clubs in Australia
- List of yacht clubs that have competed for the America's Cup
