= Circolo Nautico e della Vela Argentario =

Sport club in Italy

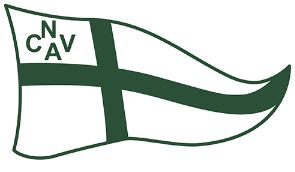
- Burgee
- Short name: CNVA
- Founded: 1974; 52 years ago
- Location: Cala Galera, Porto Ercole, Italy
- Commodore: Claudio Boccia
- Website: www.cnva.it

The Circolo Nautico e della Vela Argentario (CNVA) is a sport club founded in 1974 by the merger between the Circolo Vela Argentario and the Circolo Nautico Porto Ercole, both founded in 1963 with headquarters in Porto Ercole. With the construction, in the early seventies, of the new port of Cala Galera, the two clubs decided in 1975 to transfer the headquarters to the new Marina.

Over the years, the new headquarters became the meeting point of many personalities who at that time attending the Argentario peninsula, including the Queen of the Netherlands, Constantine II of Greece and Juan Carlos I of Spain.

For reasons of affiliation with FIV, the club adopts the white-green CVA banner with the new CNVA logo as a social banner.

Among the events and races organized by the Yacht club we can cite: National and European championships and stages of the national circuits of the classes are organized, Mumm 3, Beneteau 25, First 40.7, Ufo 22 and J/24 which at the club made the basis of their Argentario Fleet , the most numerous and active in Italy, with over thirty boats. Since 1975 the club has organized the oldest offshore sailing championship in Italy, the Argentario Winter Championship.

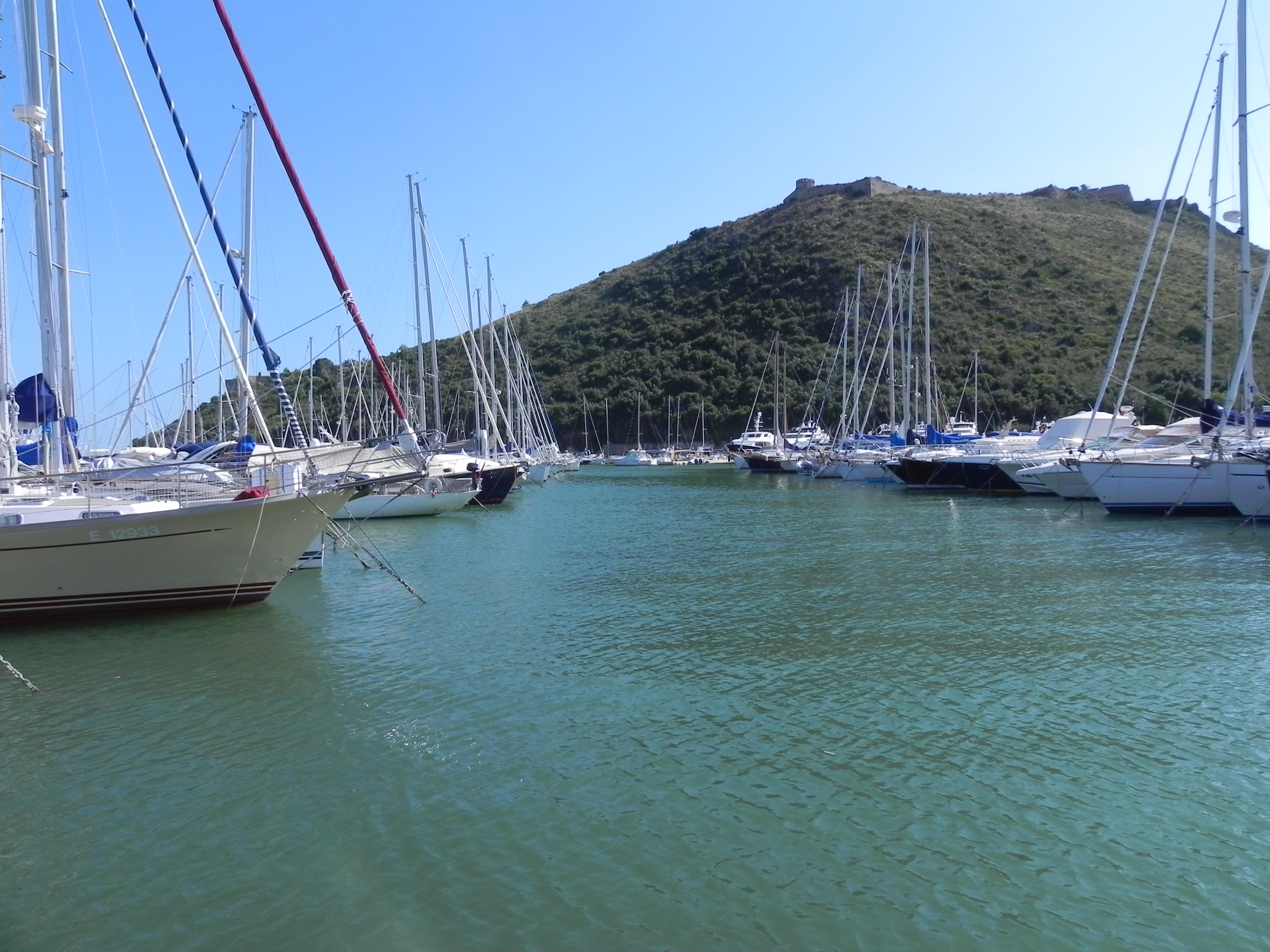
Dock of the port of Cala Galera, Porto Ercole

== Twin clubs ==
- Yacht Club Punta Ala, Punta Ala
- Yacht Club Italiano, Genoa
- Costa Rica Yacht Club, Puntarenas
- Yacht Club Porto Rotondo
- Circolo Vela Bari, Bari
- Compagnia della Vela, Venice
- Circolo del Remo e della Vela Italia, Naples
- Yacht Club de Monaco, Monaco
- Republic of Singapore Yacht Club Singapore

== See also ==
- Yacht Club Santo Stefano
