= Monte Argentario =

- Comune
- Comune di Monte Argentario
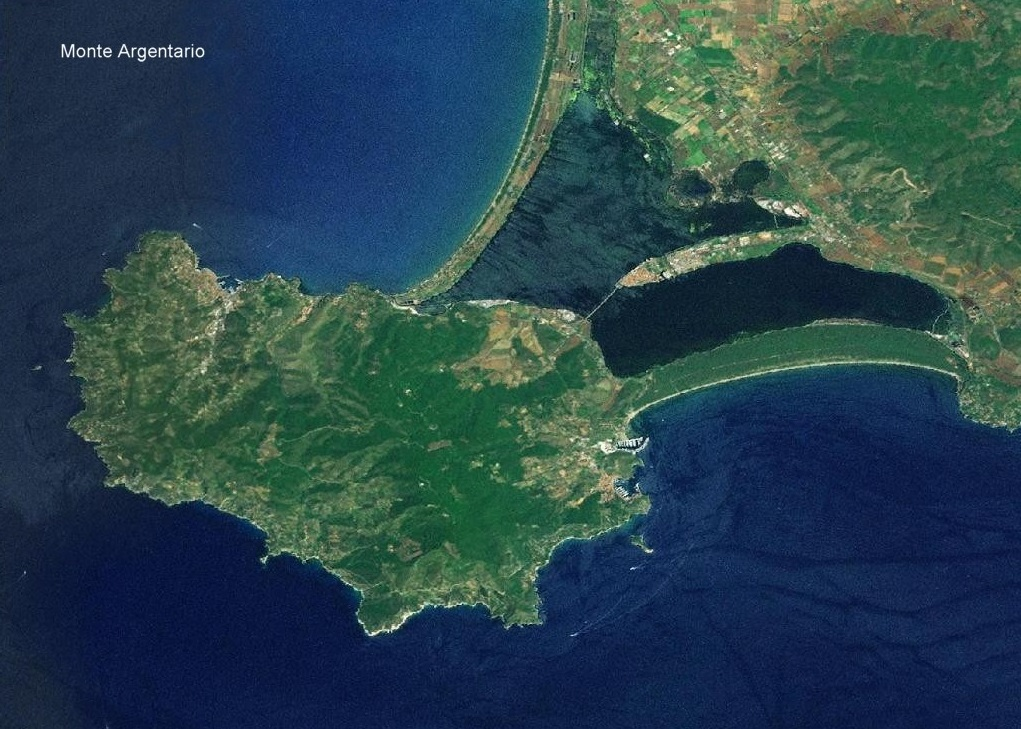

- Monte Argentario within the Province of Grosseto

- Location within Italy Location within Tuscany
- Coordinates: 42°26′N 11°7′E
- Country: Italy
- Region: Tuscany
- Province: Grosseto (GR)
- Frazioni: Cala Moresca, Cala Piccola, Carrubo, Porto Ercole, Porto Santo Stefano, Pozzarello, Santa Liberata, Sbarcatello, Terrarossa

Government
  - Mayor: Francesco Borghini

Area
  - Total: 60.3 km^{2} (23.3 sq mi)
- Elevation: 5 m (16 ft)

Population (1 January 2022)
  - Total: 11,994
  - Density: 199/km^{2} (515/sq mi)
- Demonym: Santostefanesi
- Time zone: UTC+1 (CET)
  - Summer (DST): UTC+2 (CEST)
- Postal code: 58019
- Dialing code: 0564
- Patron saint: Sts. Erasmus and Stephen
- Saint day: June 2
- Website: Official website

Monte Argentario is a comune (municipality) and a peninsula belonging to the Province of Grosseto in the Italian region Tuscany, located about 35 kilometres (22 mi) south of Grosseto. The peninsula is connected with the mainland by three spits of land which form two lagoons, the Laguna di Ponente on the west side and the Laguna di Levante on the east side of the middle dam. The two main villages on Monte Argentario are Porto Santo Stefano, chief town, facing north, and Porto Ercole facing south.

Monte Argentario borders the comune of Orbetello, which is located on the middle dam between the two lagoons.

== Geography ==
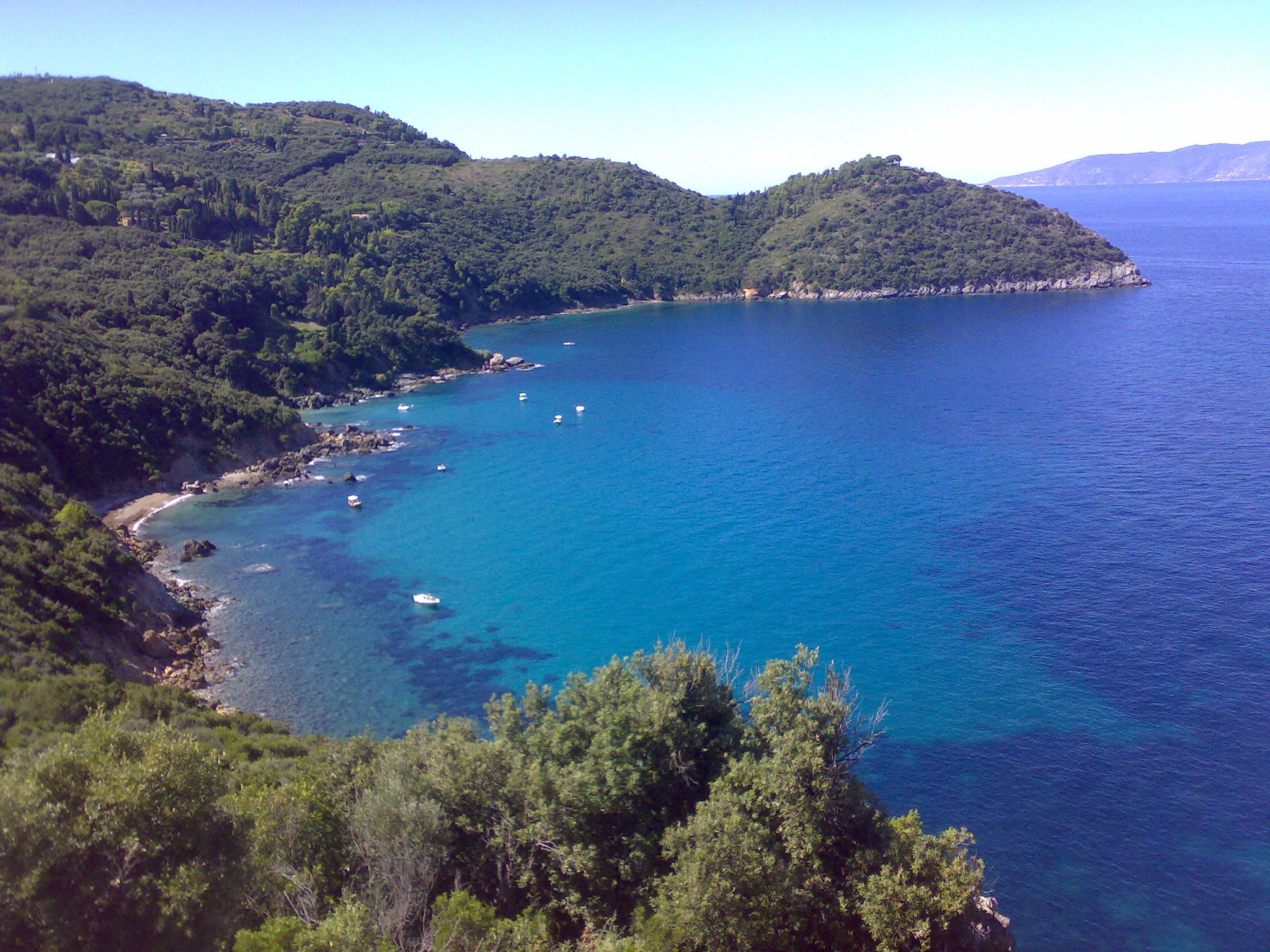
Cala Grande

Monte Argentario is a promontory stretching towards the Tyrrhenian Sea in correspondence of the two southernmost islands of the Tuscan Archipelago, Giglio and Giannutri. The promontory was an island in the past, but the sea currents and the Albegna river joined it with the mainland through two so-called tomboli (stretches of land), the Tombolo of Giannella and the Tombolo of the Feniglia.

The highest peak of Monte Argentario is the Punta Telegrafo at 635 metres (2,083 ft) above sea level. The landscape and the coast are mainly rocky, with numerous harbors, usually with rock beaches. The municipal seat is in the northern settlement, Porto Santo Stefano. The other main settlement in the township is Porto Ercole.

Argentarola cave lies close to Argentario promontory. The high quality speleothems that have been collected from this cave have allowed scientists to study the 215,000 year history of sea-level oscillations in this region.

=== Climate ===
Climate data for Monte Argentario (1991-2020)
Month	Jan	Feb	Mar	Apr	May	Jun	Jul	Aug	Sep	Oct	Nov	Dec	Year
Mean daily maximum °C (°F)	8.83 (47.89)	9.50 (49.10)	12.33 (54.19)	15.61 (60.10)	20.38 (68.68)	25.29 (77.52)	28.88 (83.98)	29.03 (84.25)	23.61 (74.50)	18.23 (64.81)	13.21 (55.78)	9.72 (49.50)	17.88 (64.19)
Daily mean °C (°F)	6.09 (42.96)	6.20 (43.16)	8.53 (47.35)	11.45 (52.61)	15.81 (60.46)	20.36 (68.65)	23.47 (74.25)	23.81 (74.86)	19.11 (66.40)	14.89 (58.80)	10.57 (51.03)	7.15 (44.87)	13.95 (57.12)
Mean daily minimum °C (°F)	4.15 (39.47)	3.92 (39.06)	5.87 (42.57)	8.51 (47.32)	12.51 (54.52)	16.75 (62.15)	19.55 (67.19)	20.00 (68.00)	15.97 (60.75)	12.53 (54.55)	8.54 (47.37)	5.14 (41.25)	11.12 (52.02)
Average precipitation mm (inches)	59.25 (2.33)	47.31 (1.86)	50.38 (1.98)	44.65 (1.76)	38.85 (1.53)	17.60 (0.69)	9.61 (0.38)	15.61 (0.61)	66.19 (2.61)	75.55 (2.97)	102.25 (4.03)	72.13 (2.84)	599.38 (23.59)
Average precipitation days (≥ 1.0 mm)	6.23	5.37	5.77	5.87	4.90	2.13	1.17	1.86	4.50	5.73	9.23	7.90	60.66
Average relative humidity (%)	75.15	71.66	69.63	67.35	64.45	60.78	56.79	58.68	67.44	75.84	79.08	75.26	68.51
Average dew point °C (°F)	1.83 (35.29)	0.94 (33.69)	2.62 (36.72)	4.85 (40.73)	8.09 (46.56)	11.29 (52.32)	12.82 (55.08)	13.50 (56.30)	12.28 (54.10)	10.44 (50.79)	6.97 (44.55)	2.84 (37.11)	7.37 (45.27)
Source: NOAA

== History ==
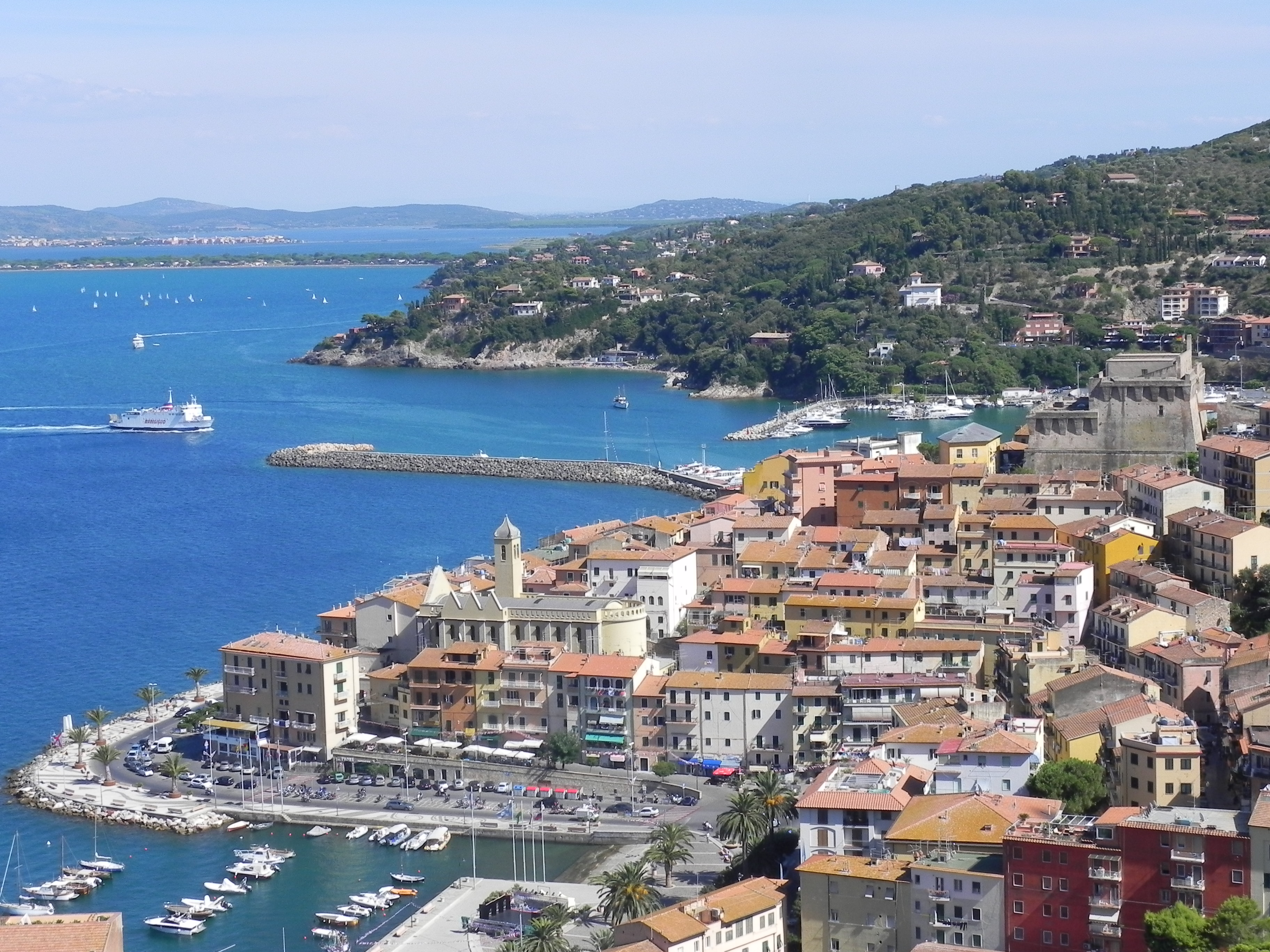
Porto Santo Stefano

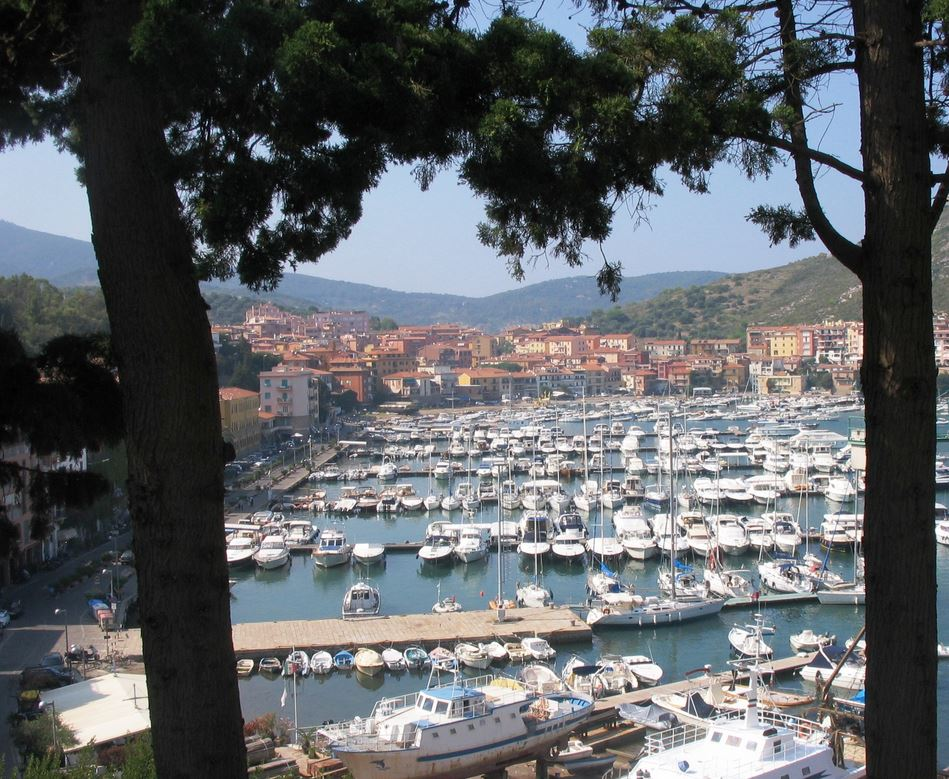
Porto Ercole

The promontory, probably already inhabited by the Etruscans, was a personal property of the Domitii Ahenobarbi family, who obtained it in return for the money they lent to the Roman Republic in the Punic Wars. The current name probably finds its origin here, since Argentarii was the name of money lenders in ancient Rome.

Later an imperial possession, it was ceded to the church by Constantine the Great in the 4th century AD. In the Middle Ages, due to the reduced traffic passing on the nearby Via Aurelia, the area was sparsely settled. In the heart of the Middle Ages, the promontory became a possession of the Monastery of San Paolo in Rome. It represented in the so-called Carolingian Gate at the Monastery of St. Anastius outside Rome. Following the history of Orbetello, the promontory was a possession of the Aldobrandeschi, the Orsini, King Ladislaus of Naples and Siena, until Spain acquired it in the late 16th century. The Spaniards heavily fortified the two ports, as the main stronghold of the State of Presidi. In 1815, after Napoleon's defeat, the Argentario was handed over to the Grand Duchy of Tuscany, to which it belonged until 1860, when it became part of the newly united Kingdom of Italy.

The painter Michelangelo Merisi, known as Caravaggio, died of a fever at Porto Ercole in 1610.

During World War II, the settlements of Argentario were heavily bombed, with numerous losses. The port of Santo Stefano was destroyed, and was rebuilt only in the 1950s. The railway that connected Orbetello to the mainland was never rebuilt.

== Main sights ==
- Monastery of the Presentation and Punta Telegrafo.
- Rocca Spagnola (Spanish Fortress), in Porto Santo Stefano.
- Forte Filippo and Forte Stella, in Porto Ercole.
- The church of St. Erasmus, in the historical centre of Porto Ercole, not far from the Porta Pisana.
- The Via panoramica (Panoramic Road), running alongside the coast.
- Argentario Aquarium

== Notable people ==
- Caravaggio (1571–1610), artist
- Paul of the Cross (1694–1775), mystic, and founder of the Passionists
- Susanna Agnelli (1922–2009), politician, former mayor of Monte Argentario
- Juliana of the Netherlands (1909–2004), Queen of the Netherlands
- Benedetta Barzini (born 1943), actress and model
- Giorgetto Giugiaro (born 1938), designer
- Jessica Brando (born 1994), singer
- Luca Coscioni (1967–2006), economist and politician
- Angelo Cardinal Comastri (born 1943), Bishop of Massa Marittima-Piombino, later named cardinal
- Pino Luongo (born 1953), New York restaurateur; cookbook writer and memoirist
- Jorge Chaminé (born 1956), baritone
- Guido Carli (1914–93), banker, economist and politician
- Giangiacomo Feltrinelli (1926–1972), publisher
- Rossana Podestà (1934–2013), actress
- Olin Stephens (1908–2008), American yacht designer
- Andrei Sakharov (1921–89), Soviet nuclear physicist, dissident and human rights activist
- Don Lurio, (1929–2003), dancer, choreographer and presenter
- Amintore Fanfani (1908–99), economist and politician
- Raffaella Carrà (1943–2021), singer, dancer, television presenter, and actress.

== See also ==
- Yacht Club Santo Stefano
- Costa Concordia disaster
- Forte La Rocca Lighthouse
