= Barrachois =

Barrachois may refer to:

- Barrachois, Cape Breton County, Nova Scotia, Canada
- Barrachois, Colchester County, Nova Scotia, Canada
