= American Yacht Club =

American Yacht Club may refer to:

- American Yacht Club (Massachusetts), Newburyport, Massachusetts, US
- American Yacht Club (New York), Rye, New York, US
