= YCSS =

YCSS may refer to:

- Yacht Club Santo Stefano, a sport club in Porto Santo Stefano, Italy
- Yuan Ching Secondary School, a secondary school in Taman Jurong, Singapore
