= Argentario Aquarium =

Coordinates: 42.4382°N 11.1197°E

Acquario mediterraneo della Costa d'Argento
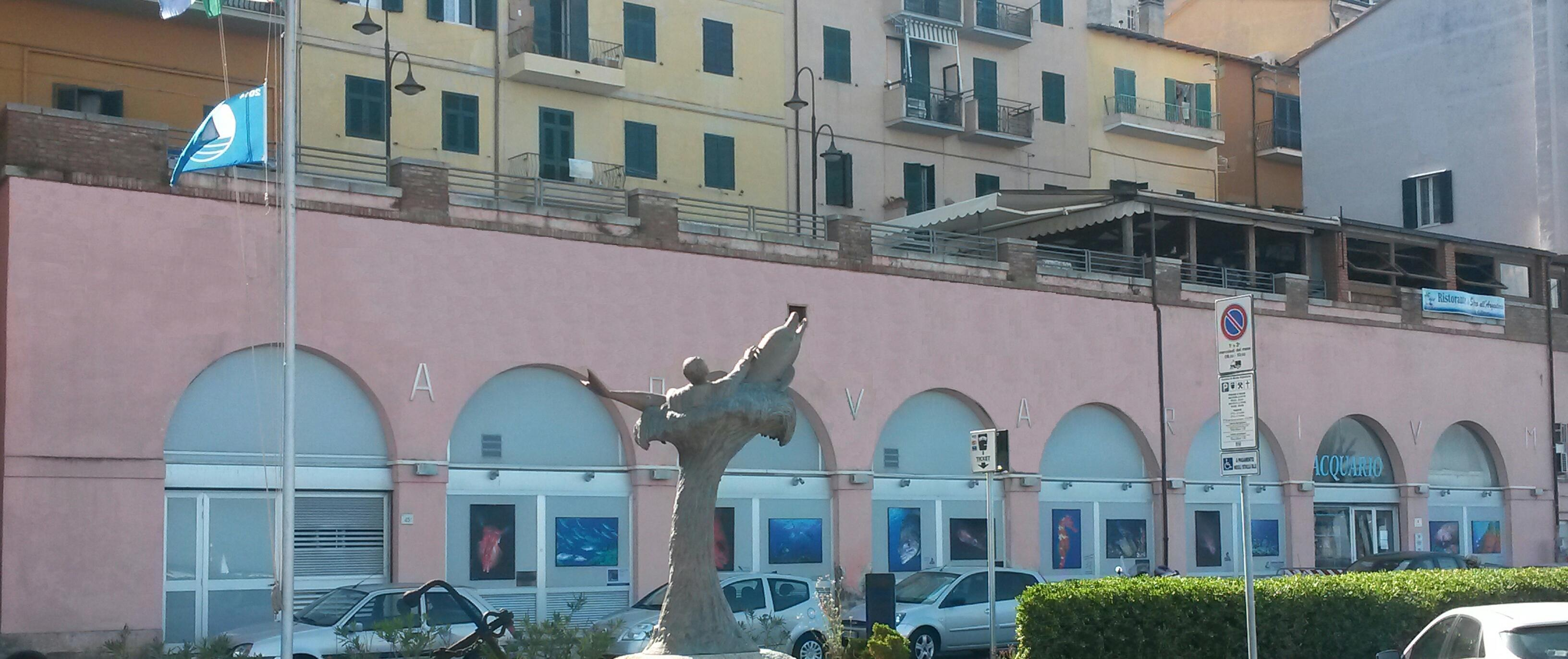
- The entrance
- Interactive map of Acquario mediterraneo della Costa d'Argento
- Date opened: 2001
- Location: Monte Argentario, Italy
- Website: www.acquarioargentario.org

The Argentario Aquarium also called Acquario mediterraneo della Costa d'Argento is a mediterranean public aquarium in Italy. It is located in Monte Argentario on the frazione of Porto Santo Stefano. It was inaugurated in 2001.
