= Forte La Rocca Lighthouse =

Forte La Rocca Porto Ercole
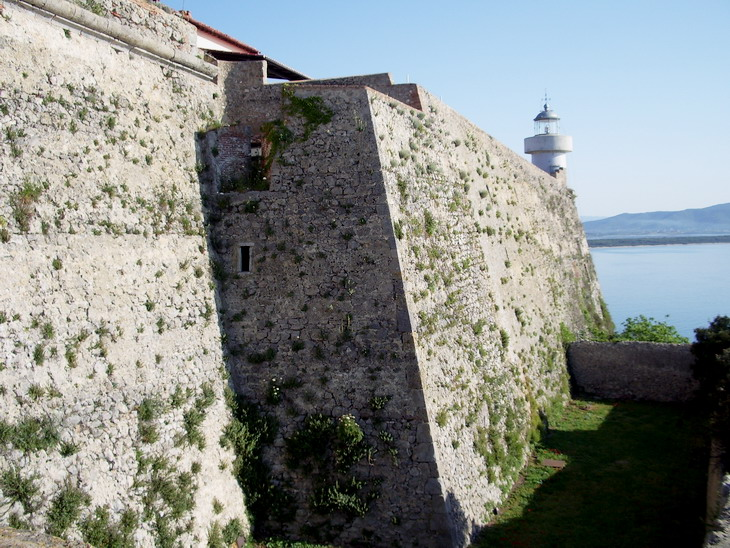
- Forte La Rocca Lighthouse
- Location: Porto Ercole; Tuscany; Italy
- Coordinates: 42°23′24″N 11°12′45″E

Tower
- Constructed: 1862
- Foundation: masonry base
- Construction: masonry tower
- Height: 19 metres (62 ft)
- Shape: cylindrical tower with balcony and lantern
- Markings: white tower, grey metallic lantern dome atop a fortification bastion
- Power source: mains electricity
- Operator: Marina Militare

Light
- Focal height: 91 metres (299 ft)
- Lens: Type TD 375; Focal length: 187,5 mm
- Intensity: main: AL 1000 W reserve: LABI 100 W
- Range: main: 16 nautical miles (30 km; 18 mi) reserve: 11 nautical miles (20 km; 13 mi)
- Characteristic: L Fl WR 7s.
- Italy no.: 2172 E.F.

Forte La Rocca Lighthouse (Italian: Faro di Forte La Rocca) is an active lighthouse located next to the tip of the promontory of the Argentario on the Tyrrhenian Sea.

== Description ==
The lighthouse, built in 1862, consists of a cylindrical tower, 19 metres (62 ft) high, with balcony and lantern placed atop the south east bastion of a fortification built by the Aldobrandeschi in the mid 1400. The tower is covered by white mosaic tails made of wind and salt resistant material; the lantern dome is grey metallic. The light is positioned at 91 metres (299 ft) above sea level and emits a long white or red flash in a 7 seconds period, depending from the direction, visible up to a distance of 16 nautical miles (30 km; 18 mi). The lighthouse is completely automated and managed by the Marina Militare with the identification code number 2172 E.F.

== See also ==
- List of lighthouses in Italy
