= Seattle Yacht Club =

Building in Seattle, Washington, U.S.

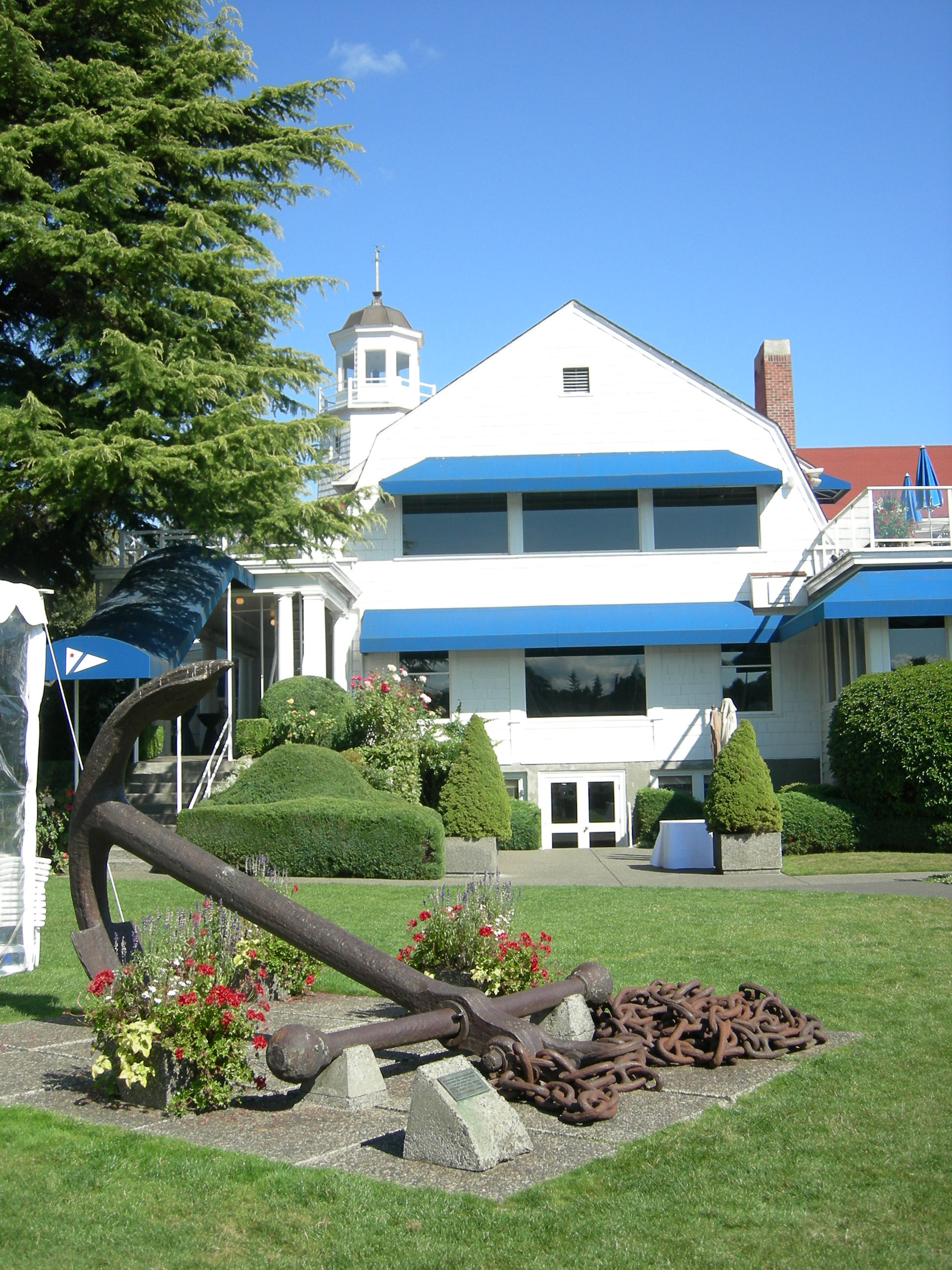
- The building's exterior
- Interactive map of the Seattle Yacht Club area

General information
- Coordinates: 47.6453°N 122.3086°W

Seattle Yacht Club is a yacht club and historic building in Seattle, in the U.S. state of Washington. It is a member of International Council of Yacht Clubs.

== See also ==
- Architecture of Seattle
- List of International Council of Yacht Clubs members
- List of yacht clubs
- List of yacht clubs that have competed for the America's Cup
- National Register of Historic Places listings in Seattle
