= List of yacht clubs that have competed for the America's Cup =

This is a list of yacht clubs that have competed for the America's Cup, or in the related Challenger series held since 1970.

Yacht club	City	Country	First challenge	AC Wins	AC Losses	LVC Appearances
Bay of Quinte Yacht Club	Belleville	Canada	1881	0	1 (1881)	0
Cercle de la Voile de Paris	Paris	France	1970	0	0	3 (1970, 1974, 2007)
Chicago Yacht Club	Chicago, IL	United States	1987	0	0	1 (1987)
Circolo della Vela Sicilia	Palermo	Italy	2013	0	1 (2021)	3 (2013, 2021, 2024)
Circolo Vela Gargnano	Gargnano	Italy	2007	0	0	1 (2007)
Club Nautique de Morges	Morges	Switzerland	2000	0	0	1 (2000)
Compagnia della Vela	Venice	Italy	1992	0	1 (1992)	1 (1992)
Cortez Racing Association	San Diego, CA	United States	2000	0	0	1 (2000)
Cruising Yacht Club of Australia	Sydney	Australia	1992	0	0	3 (1992–2000)
Darling Harbour Yacht Club	Sydney	Australia	1992	0	0	1 (1992)
Deutscher Challenger Yacht Club	Starnberg	Germany	2007	0	0	1 (2007)
Gamla Stans Yacht Sällskap	Stockholm	Sweden	2003	0	0	2 (2003, 2007)
Golden Gate Yacht Club	San Francisco, CA	United States	2003	2 (2010, 2013)	1 (2017)	2 (2003, 2007)
Kansai Yacht Club	Nishinomiya	Japan	2017	0	0	1 (2017)
Mercury Bay Boating Club	Whitianga	New Zealand	1988	0	1 (1988)	1 (1992)
Monte Real Club de Yates de Bayona	Bayona	Spain	1992	0	0	3 (1992–2000)
New York Yacht Club	New York, NY	United States	1851	25 (1851–1980)	1 (1983)	5 (1987, 2000, 2003, 2021, 2024)
Newport Harbor Yacht Club	Newport Beach, CA	United States	1987	0	0	1 (1987)
Nippon Ocean Racing Club	Tokyo	Japan	1992	0	0	1 (1992)
Nippon Yacht Club	Tokyo	Japan	1995	0	0	2 (1995, 2000)
Qingdao International Yacht Club	Qingdao	China	2007	0	0	1 (2007)
Real Federación Española de Vela	Madrid	Spain	2007	0	0	1 (2007)
Reale Yacht Club Canottieri Savoia	Naples	Italy	2003	0	0	2 (2003, 2007)
Royal Burnham Yacht Club	Burnham-on-Crouch	United Kingdom	1983	0	0	1 (1983)
Royal Canadian Yacht Club	Toronto	Canada	1876	0	1 (1876)	0
Royal Cape Yacht Club	Cape Town	South Africa	2007	0	0	1 (2007)
Royal Clyde Yacht Club	Hunters Quay	United Kingdom	1887	0	1 (1887)	0
Royal Gothenburg Yacht Club	Gothenburg	Sweden	1977	0	0	2 (1977, 1980)
Royal Harwich Yacht Club	Ipswich	United Kingdom	1871	0	1 (1871)	0
Royal New Zealand Yacht Squadron	Auckland	New Zealand	1987	5 (1995, 2000, 2017, 2021, 2024)	3 (2003, 2007, 2013)	5 (1987, 1995, 2007, 2013, 2017)
Royal Northern Yacht Club	Rothesay	United Kingdom	1886	0	1 (1886)	0
Royal Nova Scotia Yacht Squadron	Halifax	Canada	1987	0	0	1 (1987)
Royal Ocean Racing Club	London	United Kingdom	2003	0	0	1 (2003)
Royal Perth Yacht Club	Perth	Australia	1974	1 (1983)	3 (1974, 1980, 1987)	4 (1974–1983)
Royal Southern Yacht Club	Hamble-le-Rice	United Kingdom	1980	0	0	1 (1980)
Royal Swedish Yacht Club	Stockholm	Sweden	2013	0	0	2 (2013, 2017)
Royal Sydney Yacht Squadron	Sydney	Australia	1962	0	3 (1962, 1967, 1970)	2 (1970, 1983)
Royal Thames Yacht Club	London	United Kingdom	1870	0	2 (1870, 1964)	1 (1987)
Royal Ulster Yacht Club	Bangor	United Kingdom	1899	0	5 (1899–1930)	0
Royal Yacht Club of Victoria	Melbourne	Australia	1983	0	0	1 (1983)
Royal Yacht Squadron	Cowes	United Kingdom	Inaugural holder	0	7 (1851, 1885, 1893, 1895, 1934, 1937, 1958)	2 (2017, 2021)
San Diego Yacht Club	San Diego, CA	United States	1987	3 (1987–1992)	1 (1995)	1 (1987)
San Francisco Yacht Club	San Francisco, CA	United States	2000	0	0	1 (2000)
Seattle Yacht Club	Seattle, WA	United States	2003	0	0	1 (2003)
Secret Cove Yacht Club	Secret Cove	Canada	1983	0	0	2 (1983, 1987)
Société des Régates Rochelaises	La Rochelle	France	1987	0	0	1 (1987)
Société Nautique de Genève	Geneva	Switzerland	2003	2 (2003, 2007)	1 (2010)	2 (2003, 2024)
Société Nautique de Marseille	Marseille	France	1987	0	0	1 (1987)
Société Nautique de Saint-Tropez	Saint-Tropez	France	2024	0	0	1 (2024)
Southern Cross Yacht Club	Sydney	Australia	1995	0	0	1 (1995)
St. Francis Yacht Club	San Francisco, CA	United States	1987	0	0	2 (1987, 2000)
Stenungsbaden Yacht Club	Stenungsund	Sweden	1992	0	0	1 (1992)
Sun City Yacht Club	Two Rocks	Australia	1977	0	1 (1977)	1 (1977)
Tutukaka South Pacific Yacht Club	Tutukaka	New Zealand	1995	0	0	1 (1995)
Union Nationale pour la Course au Large	Boulogne-sur-Seine	France	2000	0	0	2 (2000, 2003)
Waikiki Yacht Club	Honolulu, HI	United States	2000	0	0	1 (2000)
Yacht Club Costa Smeralda	Costa Smeralda	Italy	1983	0	0	2 (1983, 1987)
Yacht Club de France	Paris	France	1983	0	0	2 (1983, 2017)
Yacht Club de Hyères	Hyères	France	1977	0	0	2 (1977, 1980)
Yacht Club de Sète	Sète	France	1992	0	0	2 (1992, 1995)
Yacht Club Italiano	Genoa	Italy	1987	0	0	2 (1987, 2007)
Yacht Club Punta Ala	Punta Ala	Italy	2000	0	1 (2000)	2 (2000, 2003)
Yale Corinthian Yacht Club	Short Beach, CT	United States	1987	0	0	1 (1987)

== See also ==
- List of yacht clubs
