= Royal London Yacht Club =

British sailing club

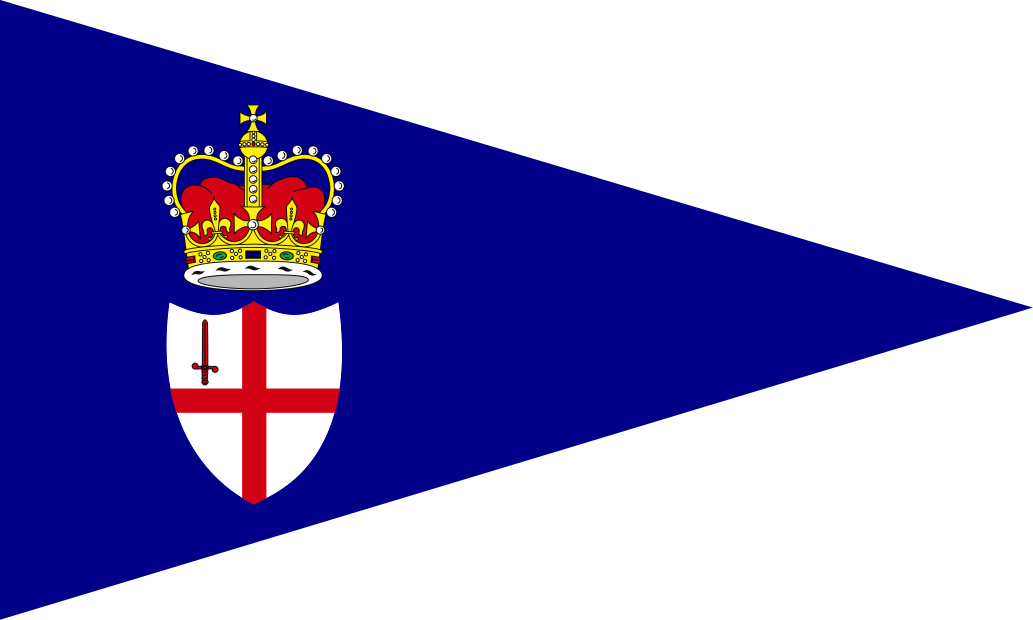
- Burgee

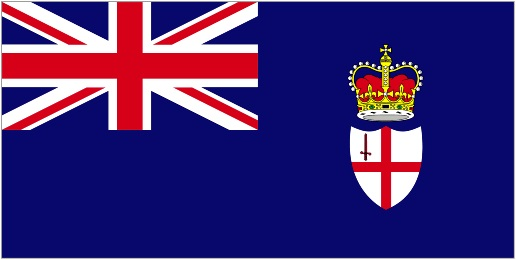
- Ensign
- Short name: RLYC
- Founded: 1838; 188 years ago (as Arundel Yacht Club)
- Location: The Parade, Cowes, Isle of Wight
- Commodore: Mrs Shelagh Jones
- Website: www.rlyc.org.uk

The Royal London Yacht Club (RLYC) is a British yacht club. It is situated on the Parade in Cowes on the Isle of Wight in the United Kingdom. Formed in 1838, it is the sixth oldest Yacht Club in the United Kingdom.

Originally formed as The Arundel Yacht Club in the Strand, it became the London Yacht Club in 1845 and moved to Cowes in 1882.

== History ==
=== Formation ===
The RLYC began in 1838 as an informal gathering of gentlemen who sailed their yachts on the River Thames. They moored their yachts on the river by the Arundel Steps, near the present site of Arundel Street and HQS Wellington. Without a permanent clubhouse, they met when off the water at the Coal Hole Tavern in Fountain Court alongside many other societies of the day.

=== Name and insignia changes ===
After its formation, the club crew in standing and profile, and went through several changes of name and insignia.

When known as the Arundel Yacht Club, the club's ensign was a red flag with a white border, with the letters "AYC" on the field in white.

In 1845, the members changed the name to the "London Yacht Club" and adopted a new ensign - white, modelled after that of the Royal Navy but with a blue cross (as opposed to the Navy's red cross) and a gold star in the canton. The following year, the Lord Mayor unusually granted the use the Coat of arms of the City of London Corporation, which replaced the star in the canton.

Shortly after, the ensign changed again to when the Dowager Queen Adelaide gave the club royal patronage. The club became the "Royal London Yacht Club" and a warrant permitted the flying of a Blue Ensign defaced with the arms of the City of London.

=== Relocation to Cowes ===
In the 1860s, Victoria Embankment was built, which changed the waterfront of the Thames. Later, evidence suggests that in the early 1880s the public house formerly known as the Coal Hole where the club originally met was demolished.

Perhaps for this cause, in 1882 the RLYC re-located to Cowes on the Isle of Wight where it joined the Royal Yacht Squadron to become the second Cowes-based club. Two Georgian town houses on the Parade were leased; now with the party wall removed, they remain the clubhouse today with the combined staircase of the two houses forming a grand staircase to the club's drawing room.

== Racing ==
In the early days of the club, it was involved in establishing rules for yacht racing. The club has long been associated with Metre Yachts and every summer since 2007 the club has organised Cowes Classics Week in the weeks prior to Cowes Week.

The RLYC cooperates with other clubs in Cowes to run racing throughout the season. It is part of Cowes Clubs and Classes Association, which coordinates weekend racing in Cowes between the other Yacht Clubs and dayboat class so that each club rotates the responsibility of organising racing on a given weekend with a consistent set of sailing instructions. The RLYC has long supported the running of Cowes Week, and to this day is nominally responsible for organising racing on the Monday

The club is also known for organising high-level regattas up to World Championship level, including the Tempest Class and Etchells Class in 2016.

== See also ==
- Royal Yacht Squadron
- Royal Thames Yacht Club
