= Balatonfüredi Yacht Club =

Hungarian yacht club

The burgee of the Balatonfüredi Yacht Club

The Balatonfüredi Yacht Club (BYC) is Hungary's oldest established and one of its leading yacht clubs. Since its founding in 1867, its youth programmes have trained multiple olympic sailors and Blue Ribbon Round the Lake Balaton Race winners. On the Hungarian Yachting Association's leaderboard BYC is ranked among the best yacht clubs in the country.

== History ==
The Balaton-Füred Yacht Association was founded by members of the Hungarian gentry in 1867. Its first president learned to sail in England. In 1881, an English boatbuilder set up shop adjacent to the clubhouse. In 1884 and again in 1912, it changed names first to Stefania Yacht Association and then to the Magyar Yacht Association and, finally, until World War II, the Royal Hungarian Yacht Club. After World War II, private social groups were disbanded, including the yacht club. In 1948, Istvan Németh founded the Balaton Shipping Workers Sports Association, which became the Balatonfüredi Vasas SC in 1951. In 1985 it became the Ganz Ship Balatonfüredi SE and in 1990 the Balatonfüredi Sport Club. It acquired the name, Balatonfüredi Yacht Club in 1996.

== See also ==
- World's Oldest Yacht Clubs
- Yacht Clubs of the World
- Hungarian Yachting Association
- Prince Edmund Batthyany-Strattmann
