= Charlottetown Yacht Club =

- Abbreviation: CYC
- Formation: 1922
- Type: Sports Club, Boating, marina
- Legal status: active
- Purpose: Promote small boat sailing and motorboating in and about the Charlottetown Harbour
- Headquarters: Charlottetown, Prince Edward Island, Canada
- Location: 46°13′48.705″N 63°7′30.2412″W
- Region served: Prince Edward Island, Canada
- Official language: English
- General Manager: Lisa MacKinnon
- Affiliations: Canadian Power and Sail Squadrons, Canadian Yachting Association
- Website: cyc.pe.ca

The Charlottetown Yacht Club (CYC) was founded in 1922 and is a public, registered, not-for-profit yacht club located in Charlottetown, Prince Edward Island, Canada.
