= Neenah-Nodaway Yacht Club =

Yacht club based in U.S.

- Burgee
- Short name: NNYC
- Founded: 1864 (Neenah Yacht Club), 1905 (Neenah-Nodaway Yacht Club)
- Location: 98 5th St, Neenah, Wisconsin 54956, United States
- Website: www.nnyc.org

The Neenah-Nodaway Yacht Club (NNYC) is an American yacht club based in Neenah, Wisconsin. Founded in 1864 as the Neenah Yacht Club, it merged in 1905 with the Nodaway Yacht Club, which had been established to promote one-design boats. The club marked its 150th anniversary in 2014, featuring keynote speaker Gary Jobson.

NNYC participates in Lake Winnebago events and supports the Fox Valley Sailing School, as well as other community programs.

Neenah-Nodaway's stated goals include:

1. To promote pleasure sailing and racing under equal conditions on Lake Winnebago.
2. To limit and define the building of new boats to certain class dimensions and club models.
3. To establish a standard code of rules and signals for the lake.
4. To discourage extravagant expenditure in yachting.

== History ==
The earliest documented reference to the Neenah Yacht Club appeared in 1863, when it was noted in press reports as having won the lake championship. Lloyd's Register of American Yachts lists the club's founding year as 1864, making it one of the oldest yacht clubs in the USA. Between 1867 and 1869, Oshkosh and Fond du Lac also formed yachting clubs, initiating regular intercity competitions.

In the 1870s, the Minnie Graves was a vessel associated with the Neenah Yacht Club. During the 1870s, the Neenah Yacht Club sailed the Minnie Graves, piloted by professional skipper Eb Stevens and manned by crew member Captain Hank Haff, who later participated in the America's Cup.

During the 1880s, overall yachting activity on Lake Winnebago declined. While some continued to compete, the region's prominence in the sport diminished. As J.C. Kimberly described, Neenah's status was "down in the trough of the wave."

In the spring of 1893, a design concept was introduced to Neenah by William Z. Stuart. The Yosida, a sixteen-foot cat yawl, helped revive local interest in sailing. In February 1894, Stuart convened a meeting at his home with other local figures, resulting in the formation of the Nodawa Boat Club. The group later adopted the name Nodaway Yacht Club.

The Neenah-Nodaway Yacht Club was formed in 1905 when the two local clubs merged. At that time, activity centered around the Class A scows, with J. C. Kimberly winning the Felker Cup in 1905.

World War I disrupted racing, and the club’s annual regatta was cancelled in 1917 and 1918. Activity revived in 1921, and in 1923 the Inland Regatta was held in Neenah for the first time. The club hosted several Inland regattas between 1927 and 1964.

The Great Depression of the 1930s led to a decline in racing, but club activities continued with a focus on junior sailing. During World War II, the club also provided training for students from the Lawrence University campus enrolled in the V-12 Navy College Training Program.

In the decades following the war, NNYC expanded its fleets and introduced sailing instruction programs for juniors and adults. By the mid-1970s, the club’s facilities supported multiple fleets, including Flying Scots, Lasers, and cruising yachts.
