= Pino Luongo =

Italian-born American restaurateur

- Born: Tuscany
- Culinary career
- Cooking style: Italian
- Previous restaurant(s): Il Cantinori (1983), Sapore di Mare (1988), Le Madri (1989), Coco Pazzo (1990), Mad. 61 (1993), Tuscan Square (1997), Centolire (2001), Morso (2011), Coco Pazzo Trattoria (2017), Coco Pazzeria (2021)

Giuseppe "Pino" Luongo (born 1953)is an American-based Italian chef, restaurateur, businessman, author and memoirist.

== Early life ==
Luongo was born in Florence, Italy and raised in Tuscany's Porto Santo Stefano region.

== Career ==
Luongo moved to New York City in 1981 and began his career as a busboy at a famed Italian eatery, Da Silvano, of which he would later become manager.

In 1983, Luongo opened his first establishment, Il Cantinori, with partners Steve Tzolis and Nicola Kotsoni. Over the next three decades, Luongo would establish himself as a mainstay of Manhattan fine dining with acclaimed restaurants like Le Madri, Coco Pazzo, Centolire and Morso.

Described as colorful throughout his career, Luongo was depicted by Anthony Bourdain in his book Kitchen Confidential as being, "...a man envied, feared, despised, emulated and admired by many who have worked for and with him".

== Publications ==
Luongo has written or co-written five cookbooks: A Tuscan in the Kitchen (1988), Fish Talking (1994), Simply Tuscan (2000), La Mia Cucina Toscana (2003, with Marta Pulini), and Two Meatballs in the Italian Kitchen (2007, with Mark Strausman). He wrote a memoir, Dirty Dishes — A Restaurateur's Story of Passion, Pain and Pasta (2009, foreword by Anthony Bourdain).

== Personal life ==
Luongo and his wife have three children.
