= Barrachois, Cape Breton County =

Community in Nova Scotia, Canada

Coordinates: 46°8′29.56″N 60°26′1.43″W

Barrachois in Nova Scotia

Barrachois is a community in the Canadian province of Nova Scotia, located in the Cape Breton Regional Municipality on Cape Breton Island.
