= Porto Ercole =

- Frazione
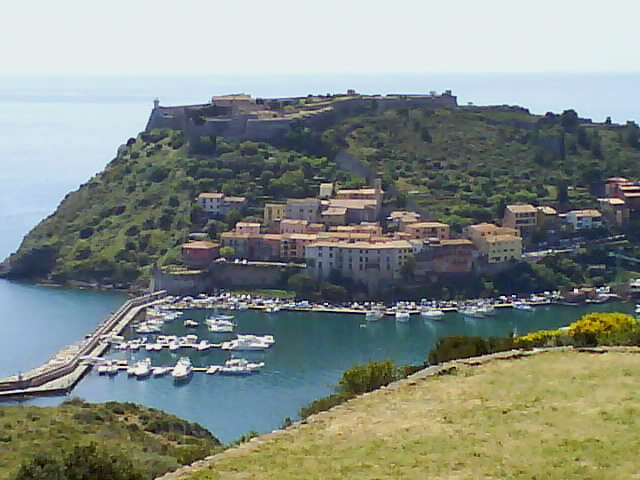

- Location of Porto Ercole in Italy
- Coordinates: 42°23′38″N 11°12′13″E
- Country: Italy
- Region: Tuscany
- Province: Grosseto (GR)
- Comune: Monte Argentario
- Elevation: 5 m (16 ft)

Population (2001)
  - Total: 2,810
- Demonym: Portercolesi
- Time zone: UTC+1 (CET)
  - Summer (DST): UTC+2 (CEST)
- Postal code: 58018
- Dialing code: 0564
- Website: Official website

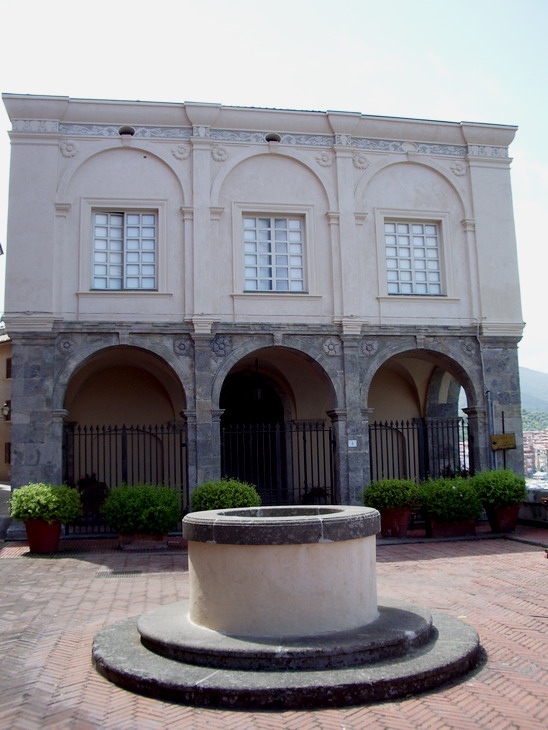
Governors Palace

Porto Ercole (Italian: [ˈpɔrto ˈɛrkole]) is an Italian town located in the municipality of Monte Argentario, in the Province of Grosseto, Tuscany. It is one of the two major towns that form the township, along with Porto Santo Stefano. Its name means "Port Hercules". It is one of I Borghi più belli d'Italia ("The most beautiful villages of Italy").

== Geography ==
The resort is located on the eastern side of Monte Argentario promontory, and is 40 kilometres (25 miles) from Grosseto, 7 km (4.3 mi) from Orbetello and about 12 km (7.5 mi) from Porto Santo Stefano. To the north of Porto Ercole are located the Laguna di Orbetello and the Tombolo della Feniglia.

== History ==
Porto Ercole was first mentioned in 1296, when Margherita Aldobrandeschi, countess of Sovana, ordered the construction of a tower named Torre di Terra, the oldest core of the town.

In 1610, the Italian Baroque painter Caravaggio, exiled by the Pope, died in Porto Ercole on his way back to Rome and was buried in a local church. The Dutch royal family maintained a summer residence here in the latter half of the twentieth century.

== Transportation ==
Porto Ercole was once connected by rail to Orbetello via a small rail line to Porto Santo Stefano, closed in 1944. The former station, named Porto Ercole-Terrarossa, was located 4 km from the town, in the hamlet of Terrarossa.

It counts two harbours: Porto Vecchio, the old town's port, and Cala Galera, located in a northern bay.

== Twin towns ==
- Caravaggio, Italy; since 1973

== Photogallery ==
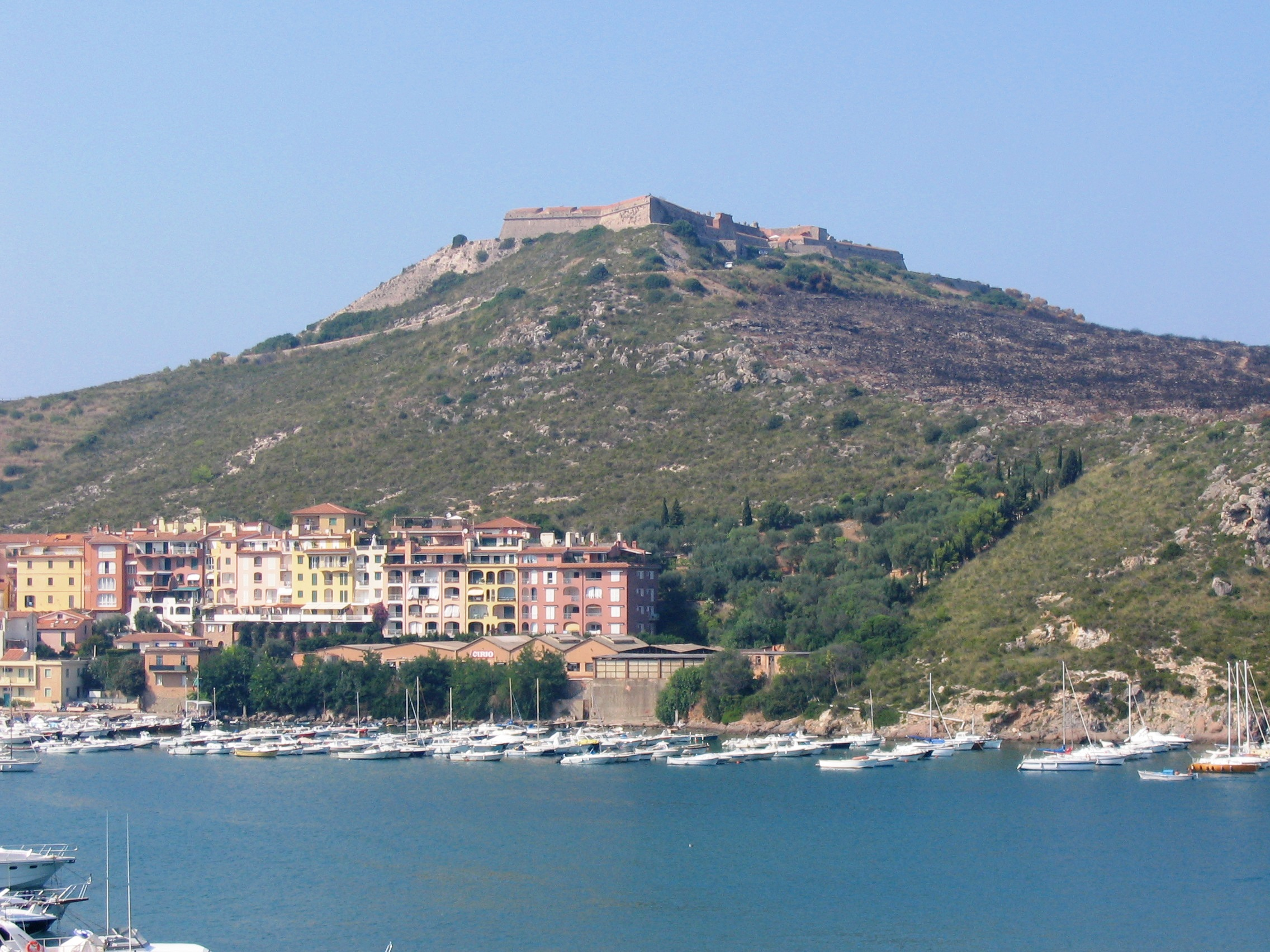
View of the town and, upon the hill, the fortress named Forte Filippo

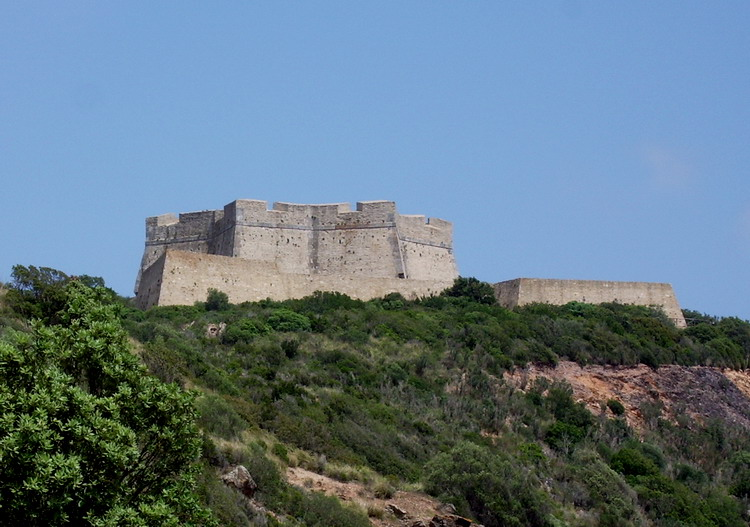
Forte Stella

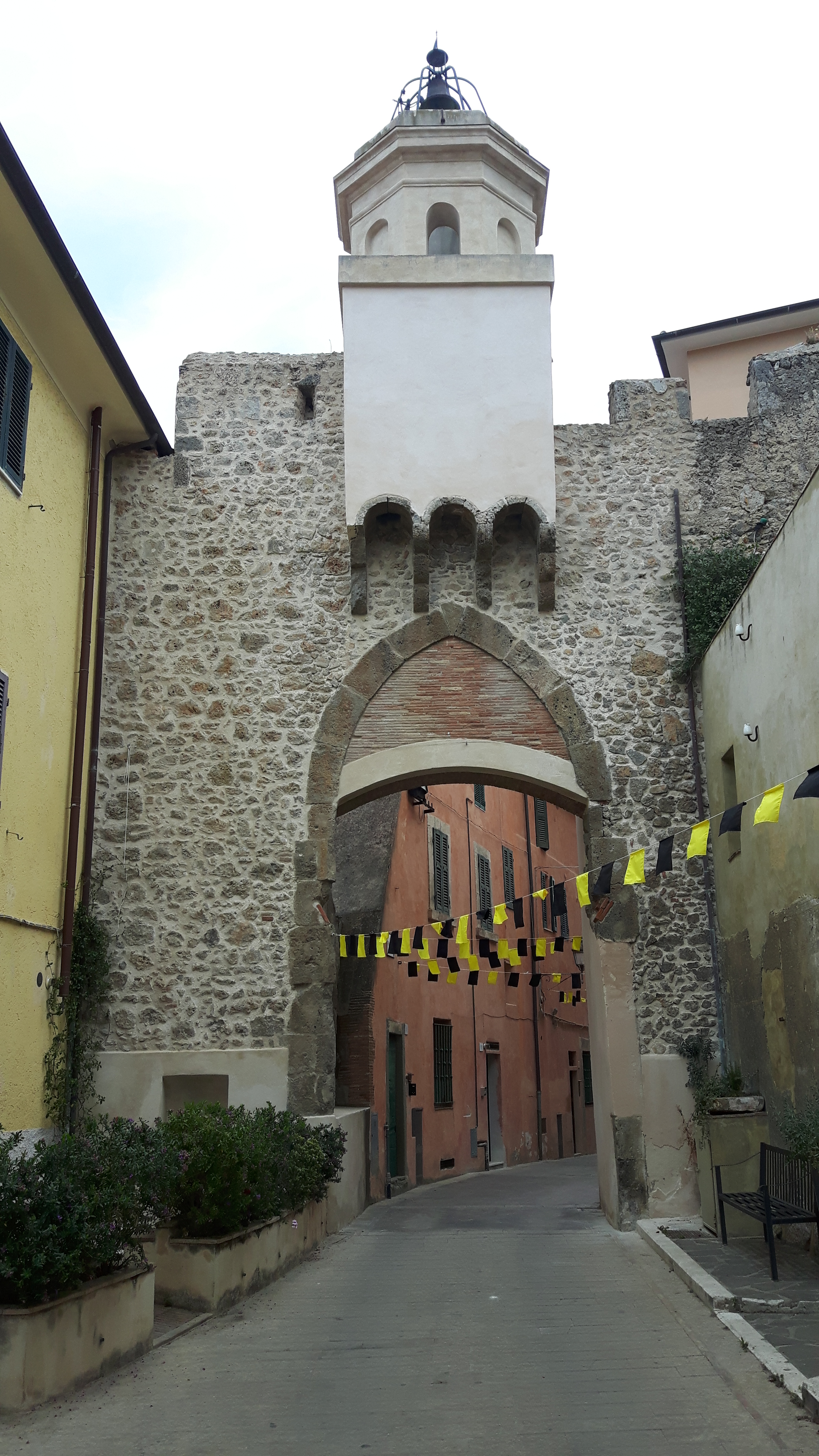
Porta di Porto Ercole

== See also ==
- Porto Santo Stefano
- Battle of Orbetello
- Yacht Club Santo Stefano
- Forte La Rocca Lighthouse
