= St. Lucia Yacht Club =

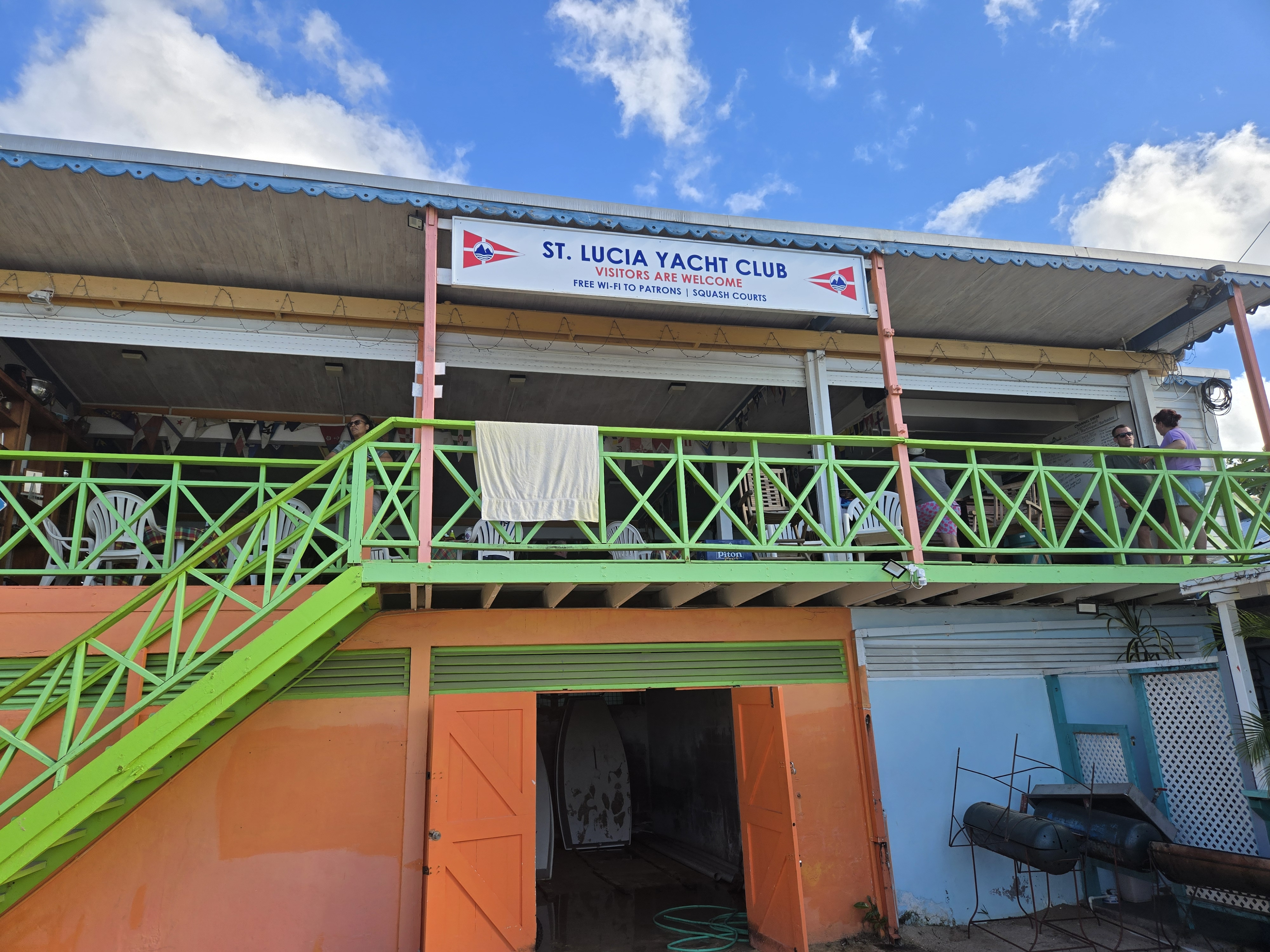
Yacht Club in St. Lucia

The St. Lucia Yacht Club, is a sports club in Rodney Bay, St. Lucia. Founded in 1966, it features yacht services, squash courts, and other sporting services. On the weekend of Whitsun the club hosts a three-day event that has been described as similar to Antigua Sailing Week. The SLYC is a destination spot for tourists and it is covered in multiple travel guides to St. Lucia. It is also the home of the St. Lucia Channel Swim from St. Lucia to St. Vincent, Martinique and Barbados. The channel swim event was established in 2018.
