= Carmel Sailing Community =

Israeli sailing organization

Carmel Sailing Community (CSC)
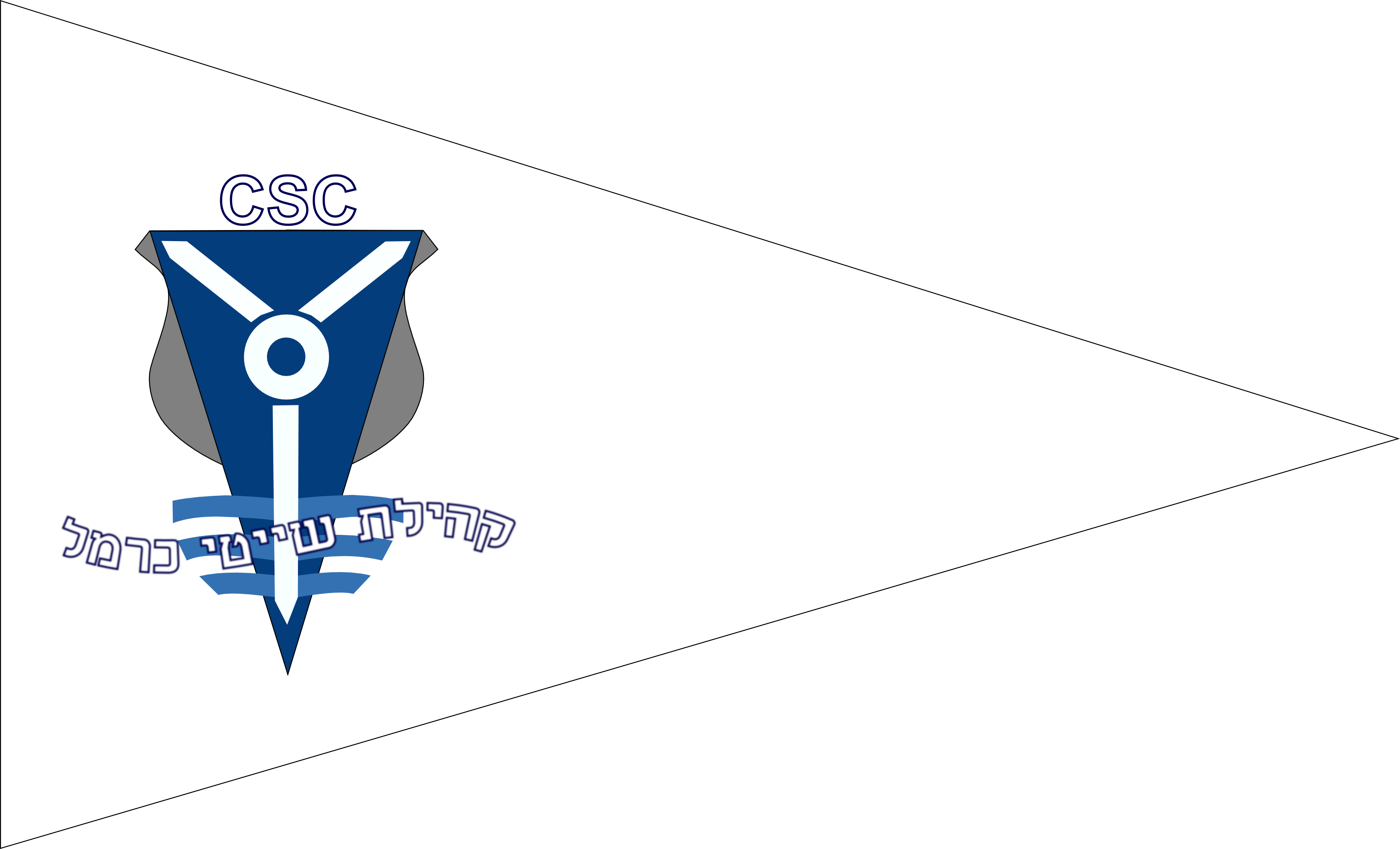
- Logo
- Formation: 2014
- Legal status: active
- Purpose: advocate and public voice, educator and network for Recreational boating, volunteers and events
- Location: Haifa, Israel
- Official language: Hebrew
- Commodore: Shlomo Cohen
- Website: CYC.co.il

Founded in 2014, the Carmel Sailing Community primarily operates in Haifa, Israel. Its predecessor, the Carmel Yacht Club, closed in 2013. The goal of the Community is to develop the sailing community in Israel by hosting races and lectures throughout the year.

It is best known for the INS Dakar Memorial Regatta, INS Eilat Memorial Regatta and Shiyut Arim, a sailing event that dates back to 1939 and covers most of the Israeli coast.

In June 2016 the community was recognized as an official non profit organization by the Israeli justice department.

== Commodore ==
- Yochai Palzur (2014-2016)
- Shlomo "Momo" Cohen (2017-2025)
- Ayelet Sharir (2026- )
