= Multnomah Channel Yacht Club =

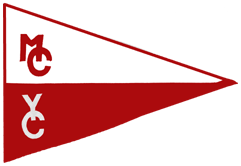
- Burgee
- Short name: MCYC
- Founded: 1961
- Location: 50990 Dike Road, Scappoose, Oregon 97056; USA
- Website: mcyc1.org

MCYC clubhouse.

The Multnomah Channel Yacht Club is a yacht club in Scappoose, Oregon, USA and is a member of the Columbia River Yachting Association.

== History ==
The club was formed in 1961. A boathouse was purchased in 1963 and remodeled into a clubhouse, which was moored at Red's Moorage near the Sauvie Island bridge, which later became Larson's moorage. In 1989 the clubhouse was moved to the current location in Scappoose. Docks and covered boat slips have been added since then. The current clubhouse was purchased in 1996, moved to the club's moorage and remodeled by club members.

== Membership and facilities ==
The club is a non-profit organization. It is located along the Multnomah Channel of the Willamette River in Scappoose, Oregon. Four floating docks are arranged in an "E" shape, with three docks perpendicular to the shore and the fourth, connecting dock parallel to the shore. The upstream dock is "A dock" and has 9 slips for boats up to 32' long. The middle dock is "B dock". The clubhouse, clubhouse tender, and four floating homes are moored to B dock. The downstream dock is "C dock". Boathouses and combos are moored to C dock. The main connecting dock is "M dock" which has boat slips for 11 boats up to 30' and 5 slips for boats up to 40'. Transient moorage is in front of the clubhouse or as directed by the moorage manager.

It consists of about 60 members, bound by a common interest in boating and fellowship on the water. Application to the club is open to anyone, membership is subject to board approval after the applicant has attended a prescribed number of meetings and events. The club maintains reciprocal arrangements with other yacht clubs in the area. There is no public moorage. The club organizes monthly cruises for members and guests.
