= Barrachois Harbour Yacht Club =

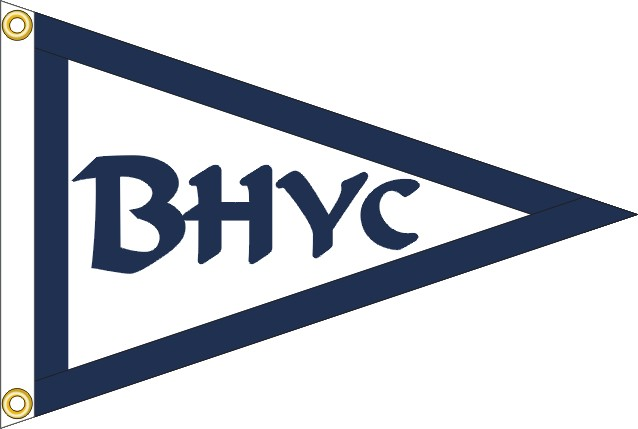
- Burgee
- Short name: BHYC
- Founded: 1996; 29 years ago
- Location: Barrachois Harbour, Nova Scotia, Canada

The Barrachois Harbour Yacht Club (BHYC) was founded in 1996 and is a private, registered, not-for-profit yacht club located in Barrachois Harbour, northern Nova Scotia, Canada, 1.58 nautical miles east-northeast of the village of Tatamagouche, with access to the Northumberland Strait across Amet Sound.

== History ==
In 1996, six boats on moorings near the Barrachois Harbour Fishermen's wharf, about 200 yards west of where the marina is now located, formed Barrachois Harbour Yacht Club.

BHYC's home, Sunrise Shore Marina (formerly Barrachois Marina), was opened 6 July 1997 by Dana and Mary Hunter of nearby Lower Waugh's River. The original capacity of the marina was 64 slips with all floating docks and finger piers, as well being the only source of dockside gasoline on the north shore of Nova Scotia between the New Brunswick border and Pictou.

The Marina has since proven itself over the years to be an excellent "hurricane hole", in particular during Hurricane Gustav (2002) and Hurricane Juan (2003). No damage to the marina or berthed BHYC vessels was inflicted by either storm, despite an approximately 8' storm surge from Gustav and winds over 80 knots (148 km/h) from Juan.

== Programs ==
BHYC offers racing and cruising programs as well as online resources for powerboats and sailing vessels, in addition to being a comprehensive source for marine weather, (with real-time radar loop), tide times and waypoint information in addition to facility contacts for the Northumberland Strait and the Bras d'Or Lake area of Cape Breton Island.

BHYC is the starting point for the biennial 31-mile yacht race to Charlottetown Yacht Club in Charlottetown, Prince Edward Island.

In 2015, the club was the Leg #3 destination (Charlottetown Yacht Club to Barrachois Harbour Yacht Club) as well as starting point for Leg #4 (Barrachois Harbour Yacht Club to Pictou Yacht Club during the NStYA Strait Challenge Regatta.
