= Porto Santo Stefano =

- Frazione
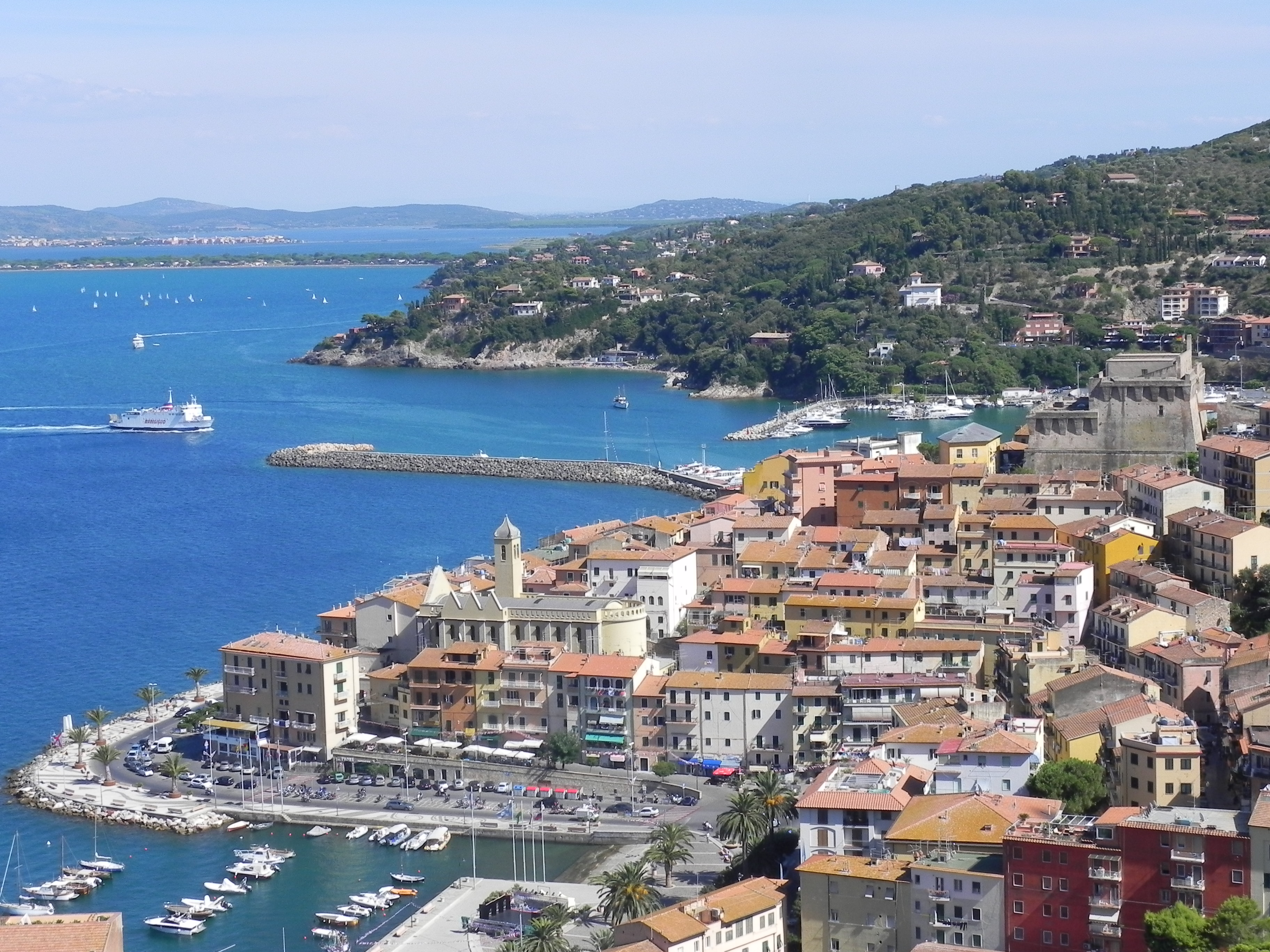

- Location of Porto Santo Stefano in Italy
- Coordinates: 42°26′7″N 11°7′3″E
- Country: Italy
- Region: Tuscany
- Province: Grosseto (GR)
- Comune: Monte Argentario
- Elevation: 5 m (16 ft)

Population (2001)
  - Total: 8,810
- Demonym: Santostefanesi
- Time zone: UTC+1 (CET)
  - Summer (DST): UTC+2 (CEST)
- Postal code: 58019
- Dialing code: 0564
- Website: comunemonteargentario.it

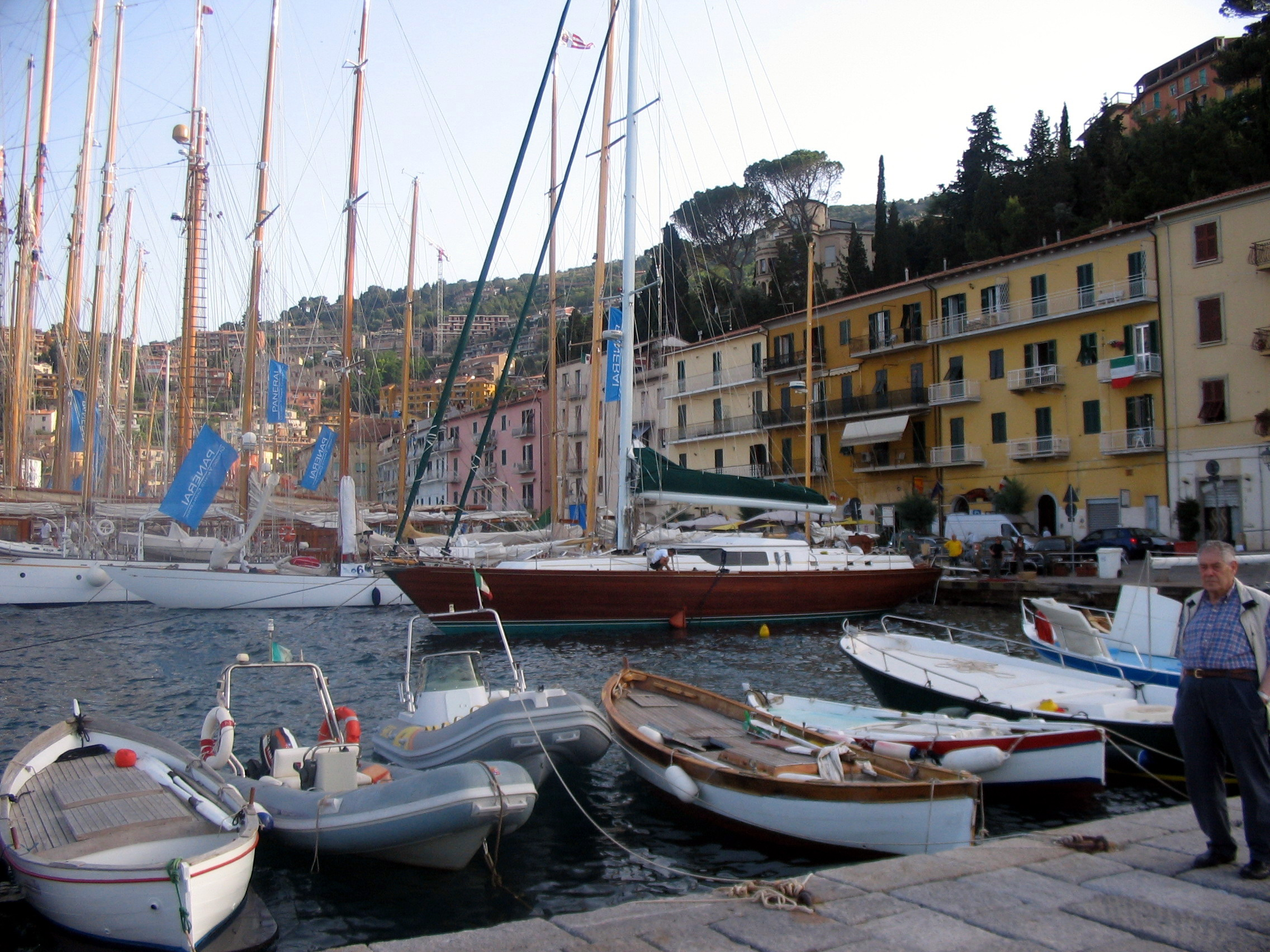
Old harbour

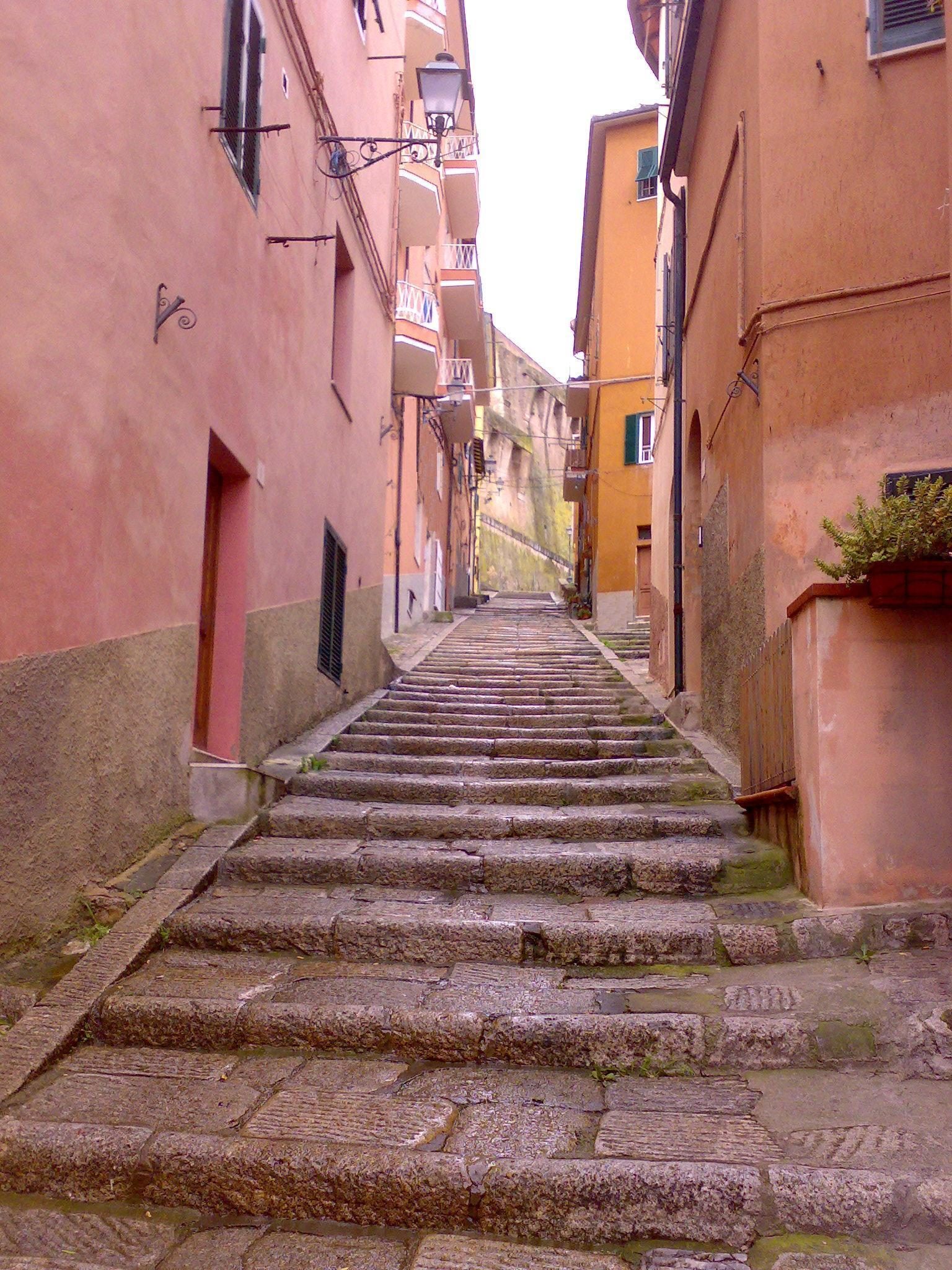
Street in the historic center

Porto Santo Stefano (Italian: [ˈpɔrto ˈsanto ˈsteːfano]) is a seaport town on the west coast of Italy, in the municipality of Monte Argentario, in the Province of Grosseto, Tuscany. It is the municipal seat of Monte Argentario and one of the two major towns that form the township, along with Porto Ercole. The region is on the slopes of Mount Argentario, which dominates the whole area.

== Geography ==
=== Position ===
The resort is located on the northwestern promontory of Monte Argentario, a little more than 40 kilometres (25 miles) southeast of Grosseto, about 12 km (7.5 mi) from Porto Ercole and 150 kilometres (95 miles) northwest of Rome.

=== Subdivisions ===
The town is divided into four historical districts, each with its own coat of arms (gonfalone) banner:

- Croce (Cross), whose nobles are called crociaioli, its coat of arms depicts a gray seagull on a red background, above the red cross of Saint Andrew on a white background.
- Fortezza (Fortress), whose nobles are called fortezzaioli; its coat of arms depicts a Spanish fortress in gold on a red background on the left side, and a golden horse to the right on an amaranth background.
- Pilarella, whose nobles are called pilarellai; its coat of arms depicts a golden vase in a red background on the left, and a light gray dolphin to the right on a blue background.
- Valle (Valley), whose nobles are called vallaioli; its coat of arms depicts an axe and the lighthouse.

== History ==
Because of the increased exposure to pirate raids, the center had low priority during the rule of Aldobrandeschi and of the Republic of Siena, but with its entry into the State of Presidi in the mid-16th century, the town became a center of great importance in Argentario. It was during this the construction of the Spanish Fort began, a powerful defensive structure that now hosts a permanent exhibition "Submerged Memories". Like all other centers in the area, Porto Santo Stefano joined the Grand Duchy of Tuscany in the first half of the 19th century.

Besides the fortress, the territory still plays host to two Spanish lookout towers; Lividonia and dell'Argentiera, the latter situated on the slopes of Mount Argentario which dominates the whole Santo Stefano area.

== Annual events ==
Notable events in the town include the Palio Marinaro, an annual 4,000-metre (2.5-mile) rowing regatta – a boat is called a "gozzo" (plural "gozzi") – which is held every August between the four districts. The prize was started in 1937, but discontinued from 1940 to 1944 because of World War II. The list of victories are: 23 victories for the Pilarella district, 19 for the Cross district, 16 for the Valley and 13 for the Fortress district.

== Transport and infrastructure ==
Porto Santo Stefano was once connected by rail to Orbetello via a small rail line, closed in 1944. The town has two port harbors: Porto Vecchio and Porto del Valle.

Porto Santo Stefano has regular ferry service to the Isola del Giglio (Giglio Island). After the capsizing of the cruise ship Costa Concordia on 13 January 2012, many of the ship's passengers and crew were evacuated to the mainland on these ferries.

== Personalities ==
- Susanna Agnelli (1922–2009), politician, former mayor of Monte Argentario.
- Benedetta Barzini (born 1943), actress and model.
- Giorgetto Giugiaro (born 1938), designer.
- Jessica Brando (born 1994), singer.
- Luca Coscioni (1967–2006), economist and politician.
- Angelo Cardinal Comastri (born 1943), Bishop of Massa Marittima-Piombino, later named cardinal.
- Frank Herbert Mason (1921–2009), American painter
- Pino Luongo (born 1953), New York restaurateur; cookbook writer and memoirist.
- Jorge Chaminé (born 1956), baritone.
- Olin Stephens (1908–2008), American yacht designer.
- Giorgio Ceragioli (1861–1947), sculptor.
- Raffaella Carrà (1943–2021), singer, dancer, television presenter, and actress.

== See also ==
- Porto Ercole
- Grand Admiral Jean Armand de Maillé-Brézé
- Yacht Club Santo Stefano
