= American Yacht Club (Massachusetts) =

- Burgee
- Short name: AYC
- Founded: 1885
- Location: Water St., Newburyport, Massachusetts 01950
- Website: www.americanyachtclub.org

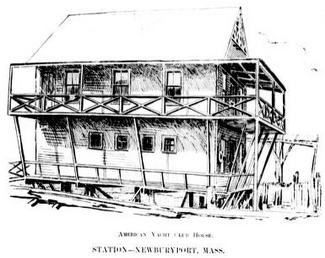
The American Yacht Club House in 1894

The American Yacht Club, in Newburyport, Massachusetts, is one of America's oldest continually operating private yacht clubs having been established in 1885.
