= Jessica Brando =

Italian singer

- Born: Jessica Vitelli; 6 December 1994 (age 31); Grosseto, Tuscany, Italy
- Genres: Soul, Pop
- Occupation: Singer
- Years active: 2008–present
- Label: EMI Music Italy
- Website: www.jessicabrando.it

Jessica Vitelli (born 6 December 1994), known professionally as Jessica Brando, is an Italian singer.

== Career ==
Born in Grosseto, Tuscany, Jessica started singing at the age of five, studying for her own fun on great singers from the past like Frank Sinatra, Ella Fitzgerald, Dinah Washington and many others.

She started her first band with some teenage friends, making cover versions of 80s dance tracks. Jessica won various local singing contests, pop and jazz, including a scholarship for the Cinecittà Studios. In 2005, she won a scholarship for the Washington School Of Ballet in the United States. At nine years old she was admitted to the Modern Dance Academy of Kledi in Rome. At thirteen she sang for the Pope, John Paul II and appeared on the TV show Il Senso della Vita singing with a band full of Italian jazz superstars.

She attended Liceo classico in Grosseto and also studied piano at Conservatorio.

In 2008, she signed a deal with EMI Music Italy. Jessica completed the recording for her debut EP in 2009, which includes four cover versions revisited in a very personal way.

On 12 January 2010, Brando was officially admitted to the Sanremo Music Festival 2010 in the "Newcomers" category with the song "Dove non ci sono ore", written by Valeria Rossi. Brando passes the first turn, entering among the four finalists, but did not win the final.

On 8 May 2010, on the stage of TRL live from Porto Antico in Genoa on MTV Italy, she launched her single "Il colore del cuore", accompanied by his band: Daniela Mornati (piano), Francesco Tringali (guitar), Giacomo Tagliavia (bass guitar), Andrea Chircoff (drums). The single was included in the album Dimmi cosa sogni, released on 13 July 2010.

== Discography ==
=== Studio albums ===
List of solo studio albums, with chart positions and certifications
Title	Details	Peak chart positions
Title	Details	ITA
Dimmi cosa sogni	Released: 13 July 2010; Label: EMI, Universal; Format: CD, digital download, streaming	94

=== Extended plays ===
Title	Album details
Jessica Brando	Release date: 30 October 2009; Label: EMI, Universal; Formats: CD, Digital download, streaming

=== Singles ===
==== As lead artist ====
Title	Year	Peak chart positions	Album
Title	Year	ITA	Album
"Time Is Running Out"	2009	—	Jessica Brando
"Stop and Stare"	2009	—	Jessica Brando
"Dove non ci sono ore"	2010	50	Dimmi cosa sogni
"Il colore del cuore"	2010	—	Dimmi cosa sogni
"Dimmi cosa sogni"	2010	—	Dimmi cosa sogni
"Nel blu dipinto di blu (Volare)"	2012	—	Non-album singles
"Sei" (featuring Boosta)	2012	—	Non-album singles

==== As featured artist ====
Title	Year	Album
"Camaleonte" (Ivan Lins and Banda Inventário featuring Jessica Brando and Maria Gadú)	2012	InventaRio encontra Ivan Lins
