= Barrachois, Colchester County =

Community in Nova Scotia, Canada

Coordinates: 45°42′45.12″N 63°15′44.52″W

Barrachois in Nova Scotia

Barrachois is a small community in the Canadian province of Nova Scotia, located in Colchester County east of Tatamagouche. The community is the home of the Barrachois Harbour Yacht Club as well as a fishing wharf and launch ramp for pleasure craft.
