= Yacht Club Santo Stefano =

Sailing club in Italy

Coordinates: 42°26′N 11°07′E

- Burgee
- Short name: YCSS
- Founded: 1960; 66 years ago
- Location: Porto Santo Stefano, Italy
- Commodore: Piero Chiozzi
- Website: www.ycss.it

Yacht Club Santo Stefano is a sailing association affiliated with the Italian Sailing Federation, founded with the aim of promoting and spreading knowledge and practice of water sports and sailing in the Argentario region. The club was established in 1960 by a group of Roman vacationers who were enthusiasts of sailing and is the oldest yacht club in the area. Among them, Mr. Giuseppe Sotis, who would become the first President of the Club and lead it for many years.

The initial headquarters is unique and splendid. The Board of Directors decides to restore an old Santo Stefano brigantine – the Spluga – moored at the head of the Valle pier, and inside its hold, there is a spacious hall. On the ground, there is a "little house" with a tennis court, bocce court, and a large wooded park.

The floating location became famous. For years, it is the meeting point for all the prominent figures visiting Argentario, starting from the Dutch Royals to sailing enthusiasts.

Later, the headquarters of the Yacht Club Santo Stefano is moved to Villa Cortesini on the tip of Pozzarello. Today, the Club House stands high above the sea in a very panoramic position overlooking the Gulf of Porto Santo Stefano, one of the best sailing grounds in Italy.

The Spluga was sunk with explosives in 1970 in a ceremony held, as was customary then, in the middle of the channel.

In the Valle Port, the Club has a well-protected water surface area on lease, equipped with fixed and floating docks built in 1964. It is intended for mooring boats for regattas and sailing school, as well as for the school's support vessels and the mooring of members' boats.

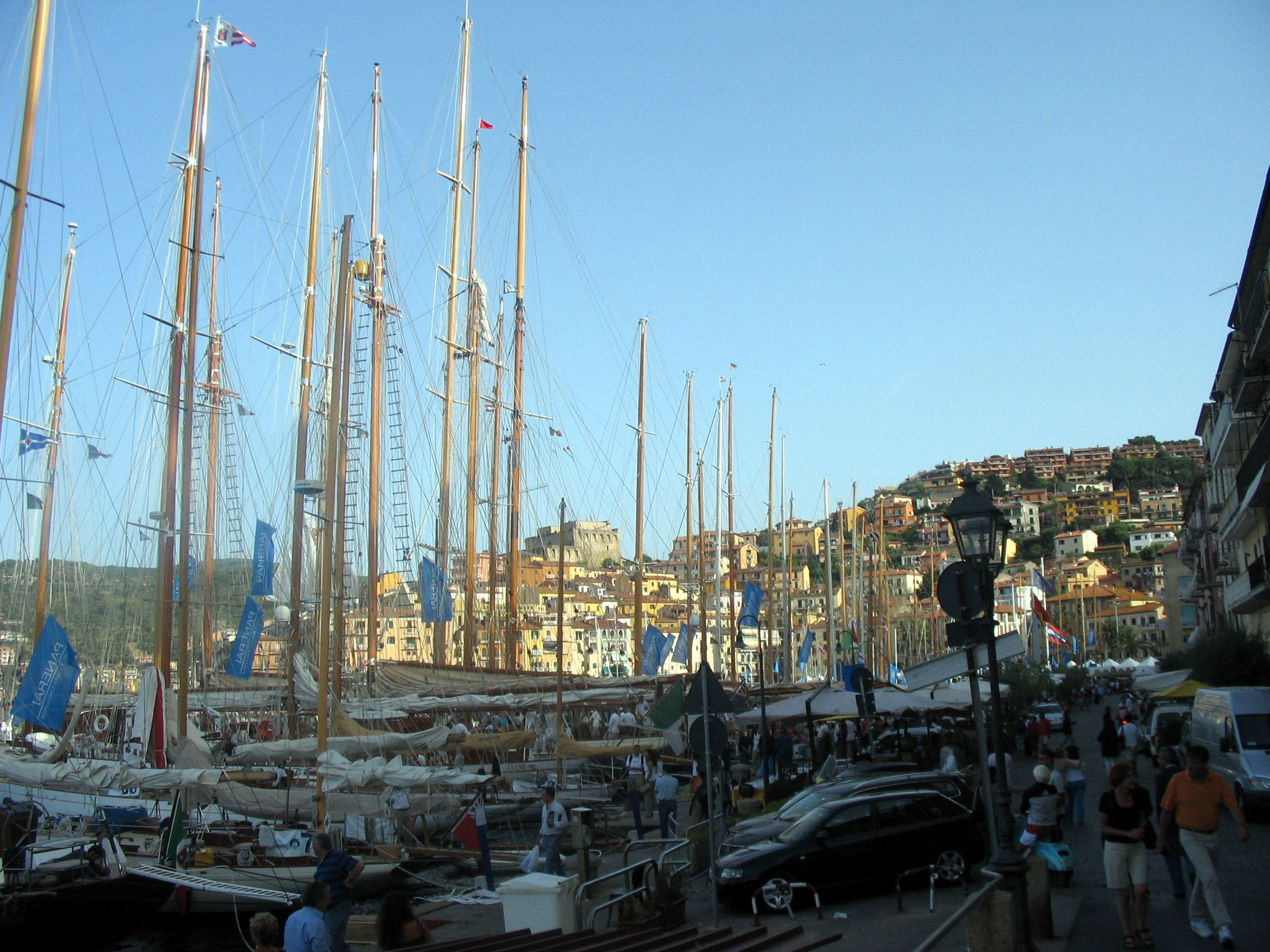
Argentario Sailing week 2006

The burgee of the club consists of a blue triangle with four stars inside: green, red, yellow, white.

The current president is Mr. Piero Chiozzi.

== Activities ==
The activity of the Yacht Club Santo Stefano, since its foundation, has developed in three directions:

1. The Sailing School: From the Olympic courses to the present day, it has trained hundreds of sailors.
2. The Offshore races
3. The activities related to the Olympic Classes

The Offshore races organized by YCSS began in the 1960s with the Genoa - Porto Santo Stefano, whose first edition was won by the "Xingù" by Lancia. There were 15 editions of the Settimana Velica, attracting the best Italian sailors from Vallicelli senior to Carcano, from Marina Spaccarelli to Straulino, from Bernotti to Pellaschier. In the 1970s and 1980s, various national championships were organized for IOR classes, selections for One Ton, Half Ton, and Quarter Ton. For Olympic classes, Yacht Club Santo Stefano organized Italian championships in Finn, Contender, Strale, and in 1977, the first Laser national championship with over a hundred boats in Porto Santo Stefano.

The activity has continued uninterruptedly to this day with 36 consecutive editions of Pasquavela, in which boats from all over the Mediterranean participate. Other national and international events organized by the club include the Baltic Cup, Cruiser Cup, Nastro Azzurro Sailing Cup, Trofeo Velico Arcipelago Toscano, and the Settimana Velica dell'Argentario.

In 1995, the club organized the Italian J24 Championship with the participation of 110 boats (an unbeaten registration record). From 2001 to 2009, YCSS organized stages of the Italian circuits for J24, Ufo 22, Melges 24, and Beneteau 25, with a constant average participation of at least 60 boats per event.

In 1992, the Yacht Club Santo Stefano organized the first vintage boat rally called "Vele d'Argento," which was so successful that it was proposed to be repeated every three years, alternating with the rally organized in Porto Cervo. In 1998, the event was repeated under the name "Prada Sailing Week" with equal success. In 1999, the vintage boat rally was replicated under the name Argentario Sailing Week. The same event, repeated every year from 2000 to the present, has seen the presence of German Frers, Doug Peterson, Sir Olin Stephens, and Dennis Conner, all included in the Sailing Hall of Fame.

At the beginning of the third millennium, the Yacht Club Santo Stefano was engaged in a major international event: the World Championship of 8m S.I. held in June 2000. The championship saw the participation of boats from Europe and America, owned by some of the most renowned shipowners. Since then, the club has organized Italian, European, and World Championships for various classes (29er and 49er, Meteor, Este 24, Platu 25, X35, First 36.7, 5m SI, 5.5m SI, Swan45).

During the winter season, the club organizes the Winter Championship of Porto Santo Stefano.

== Sailing School ==
The Federal Sailing School was inaugurated in 1961 with four dinghies provided by the Naval Academy of Livorno and has continued without interruptions since then. A subsidiary of the Italian Sailing Federation since 1961, is one of the most famous and largest sailing schools in Italy and in the southern coast of Tuscany for its high standards of instruction, safety and equipment. It is located in the bay of Pozzarello, 2 km before entering the town of Porto Santo Stefano, within the Club House premises.

The School is open year-round, with an enrollment peak of students each summer from June to September and provides a comprehensive program of courses aimed at facilitating progress in the chosen activities. The professional staff offers expert guidance and valuable advice, ensuring participants can maximize their time on the water, regardless of age, skill level, or aspirations. Students can select courses tailored to their abilities and experiences, allowing them to start at an appropriate level. Courses are held with both single and collective dinghies of the O'pen Skiff, ILCA, Laser Bahia, RS Feva, RS Quest, and 420 Uniqua classes, supported by inflatable boats for assistance. Classes are open to children, teenagers, and adults on a weekly, daily, and weekend basis, both in the morning and afternoon. The staff consists of instructors and coaches from the Italian Sailing Federation.

== See also ==
- Comune di Monte Argentario
