= Seawanhaka Corinthian Yacht Club =

- Burgee
- Short name: SCYC
- Founded: 1871
- Location: 314 Yacht Club Rd., Centre Island, New York 11771
- Website: www.seawanhaka.org

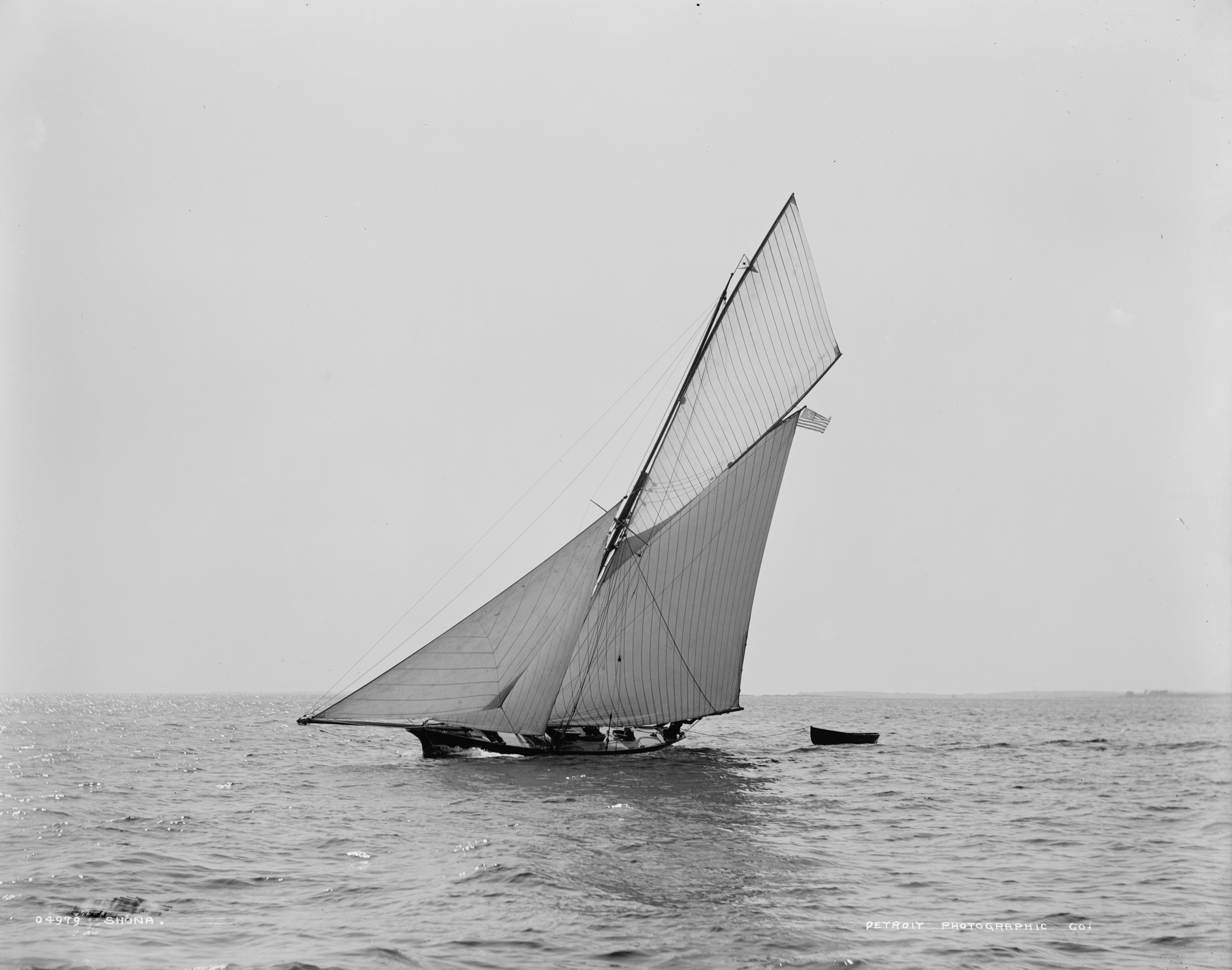
Cutter Shona raced in the Corinthian Yacht Club, New York

The Seawanhaka Corinthian Yacht Club is one of the older yacht clubs in the Western Hemisphere, ranking 18th after the Royal Nova Scotia Yacht Squadron, New York Yacht Club, Royal Bermuda Yacht Club, Mobile Yacht Club, Pass Christian Yacht Club, Southern Yacht Club, Biloxi Yacht Club, Royal Canadian Yacht Club, Buffalo Yacht Club, Neenah Nodaway Yacht Club, Raritan Yacht Club, Detroit Boat Club Detroit Yacht Club, San Francisco Yacht Club, Portland Yacht Club, New Hamburg Yacht Club, Eastern Yacht Club, and Milwaukee Yacht Club. It is located in Centre Island, New York, with access to Long Island Sound.

== History ==
The Seawanhaka Corinthian Yacht Club was founded (as the "Seawanhaka Yacht Club") in September 1871 aboard the sloop Glance, anchored off Centre Island. Glance's captain, William L. Swan, was elected Seawanhaka's first Commodore. Charles E. Willis became the Vice Commodore, Frederic de P. Foster assigned as the first Secretary, Gerard Beekmanthe Treasurer and William Foulke as the Measurers.

For many years, club meetings were held aboard this flagship. In the 1880s the Club maintained a clubhouse and anchorage at Stapleton, Staten Island near the clubhouse of the New York Yacht Club. On February 1, 1887, it was incorporated under the latter name.

In 1881 Seawanhaka held Cup races from the New York harbor to Sandy Hook, NJ.

=== Burgee ===
Club's triangular blue burgee has 12 White stars, eight in a horizontal direction and four others crossing vertically. The design was made to perpetuate the memory of the 12 founders.

=== Clubhouses ===
- Seawanhaka Corinthian Yacht Club
- U.S. National Register of Historic Places
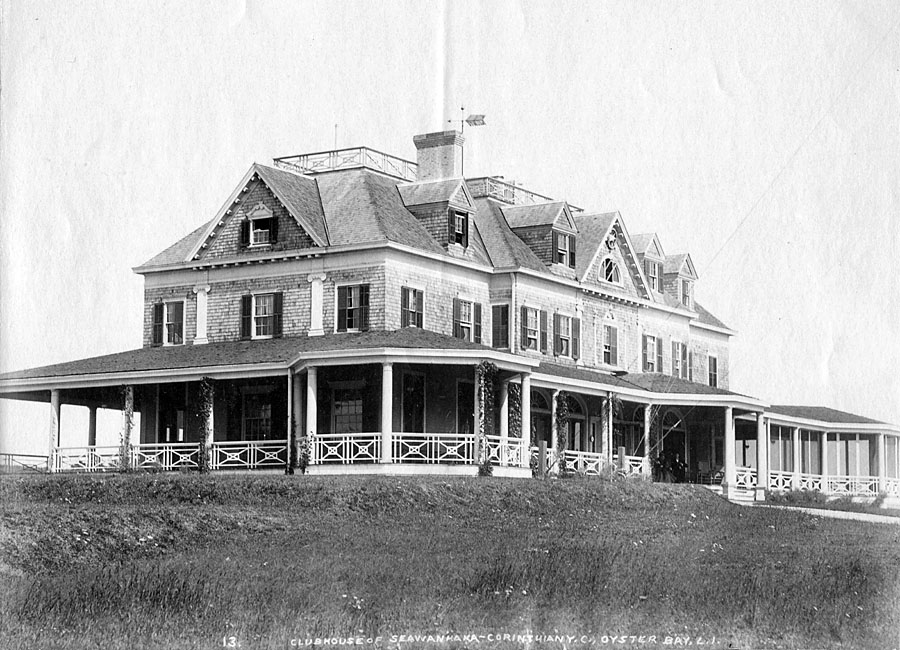
- The club in the 1890s. Photo by John S. Johnston

- Location within New York Location within the United States
- Location: Centre Island, New York
- Coordinates: 40°54′8″N 73°30′49″W
- Built: 1891
- Architects: Gibson, Robert W.
- Architectural style: Colonial Revival
- NRHP reference No.: 74001265
- Added to NRHP: January 8, 1974

In 1881, the club leased space on Centre Island, and the word "Corinthian" was incorporated into the club's name. In 1887 the organization leased a club house in Manhattan. Finally, in 1891–1892, the club returned to Centre Island, where a new club house was opened, and the club merged with the Oyster Bay Yacht Club.

Recognizing its important history, the Seawanhaka Corinthian Yacht Club was listed on the National Register of Historic Places in 1974.

=== Commodores ===
- William L. Swan
- William A.W. Stewart
- Elias Cornelius Benedict (1834–1920)
- Arthur Curtiss James
- William K. Vanderbilt Jr.
- Harold S. Vanderbilt
- Clinton H. Crane
- Henry S. Morgan
- Phillip J. Roosevelt
- Frederick R. Coudert Jr
- George E. Roosevelt
- Henry H. Anderson Jr.
- Charles G. Meyer
- P. James Roosevelt
- George S. Meyer
- Hugh Jones
- Willets S. Meyer
- Robert DeNatale
- Joseph C. Pickard

=== Seawanhaka Rule ===
In 1882, the club adopted a rating rule that would govern all its races:

$Rating=\frac{Load\ Waterline\ Length+\sqrt{Sail\ Area}}2$

Simply known as the "Seawanhaka Rule", it served as a rating for all eastern seaboard races from 1887 onwards, including the America's Cup from 1893 to 1903. The Load Waterline Length was usually placed under a class limit, where any amount beyond the limit was counted double. In the 1893 America's Cup the limit was set at 85 ft, so the Load Waterline Length of an 86 ft yacht would have counted as 87 ft.

== Junior Club ==
Seawanhaka Corinthian Junior Yacht club (SCJYC) was incorporated in 1936 as one of the first Junior Yacht Clubs on Long Island Sound. The new organization built on decades of less formal Junior sailing programs at the Seawanhaka and was intended to give the Juniors an independent club and clubhouse (also completed in 1936). Over its history SCJYC has produced many sailing champions but its most central mission has always been to produce lifelong sailors. In 2017 US Sailing awarded SCJYC Sailing Director Tomas Ruiz DeLuque with The Captain Joe Prosser Award for exceptional service to sailing.

== Notable members ==
- Timothea Larr, three-time winner of the Mrs. Charles Francis Adams Trophy, inducted into the National Sailing Hall of Fame in 2013

== References and external links ==
- Official website
- The History of the Schooner Seawanhaka
- 1890s Yacht Photography of J.S. Johnston
