= Mrs. Charles Francis Adams Trophy =

The Mrs. Charles Francis Adams Trophy, or Adams Cup for short, was the competition for the United States Women's Sailing Championship. The donor of the award was Francis Lovering Adams the wife of Charles Francis Adams III, former Secretary to the Navy and skipper of the 1920 America's Cup winner Resolute. It had its origins in the 1924 Hodder Cup. The Adams Cup was raced annually until 2011. Now retired, the Mrs. Charles Francis Adams Trophy is on display in the Reading Room of the Tom Morris Library at the National Sailing Hall of Fame.

== History ==
Ruth Sears was the first winner of the cup followed by Lorna Whittelsley. In 1933, the competition gave birth to the Women's National Yacht Racing Association. That organization was later headed by Adams Cup winner "Leggie" Mertz.

In a sport with hundreds of different classes of boats and a national champion for each, the point of the Adams Cup was to determine an overall champion for the sport of women's sailing in the United States. First run by the Women's National Yacht Racing Association, and later organized by the U.S. Sailing Association, eliminations were held throughout the country, and the finals were raced in a different type of boat each year to eliminate any advantage a sailor from any particular class might otherwise have. Competitors sailed boats provided by the host club, and teams were required to race each boat at the event once so that nobody would have an advantage in terms of equipment, similar to high school and collegiate sailing.

As with national championships in other sports, the top three finishers received gold, silver and bronze medals, respectively. The winner likewise held the Mrs. Charles Francis Adams Cup itself until the following year's champion was crowned.

Sailors from Cohasset Yacht Club won the prize first and the most number of time (9) followed by American Yacht Club who won it eight times.

== Legacy ==
Today, the United States Adult Sailing Championship, is open to both men and women but people still remember the Adams Cup. In 2016, Gary Jobson, then President of the National Sailing Hall of Fame, commented on the important history of the cup, “The Adams Cup inspired generations of women to participate and excel in the sport of sailboat racing. Collecting and preserving this legacy will keep that history alive.”

== Adams Cup Champions ==
List of champions:

Year	Club	Team
2011	Buccaneer Yacht Club	Amy Kleinschrodt, Sara Hall, Kara Kimbrell
2010	Wawasee Yacht Club	Debbie Probst, Joyce Spring, Monica Jones
2009	Buccaneer Yacht Club	Amy Kleinschrodt, Sara Hall, Ashley Hall
2008	San Francisco Yacht Club	Vicki Sodaro, Stephanie Wondolleck, Emily French, Katie Maxim
2007	Chicago Yacht Club	Betsy Altman, Nancy Heffernan, Vickie Matthews, Marie Hansson
2006	San Francisco Yacht Club	Vicki Sodaro Stephanie Wondolleck Karina Vogen Shelton Emily French
2005	Deep Creek Yacht Club	Joni Palmer, Meredith Dodd, Carrie Carpenter
2004	Rush Creek Yacht Club	Kathy Irwin, Kerri Cunningham, Nataleigh Vann, Wendy Vann
2003	Deep Creek Yacht Club	Joni Palmer, Meredith Dodd, and Carrie Carpenter
2002	San Francisco Yacht Club	Vicki Sodaro, Stephanie Wondolleck, Pamela Healy, Jodi Lee Drewery
2001 Cancelled; Patriots Cup	Chandler's Landing Yacht Club	Barbara Hawn, Linda McDavitt, Cynthia Beorner, Carolyn Wilsford
2000	San Diego Yacht Club	Mary Brigden-Snow, Julie Mitchell, Pam Gregory, Stacey Szabo
1999	Palisades, NY	Joan Hurban, Judy Hanlon, Cindy Cox
1998	Oakland, CA	Stephanie Wondolleck - San Rafael, Vicki Sodaro - Tiburon, Karina Vogen
1997	Mobile, AL	Amy Kleinschrodt, Jackie Gorski, Sara Hall
1996	Boston Sailing Center	Elaine Parshall, Sally Lane, Mary Coch, Colleen Crawley
1995	Eastern Yacht Club	Dru Slattery, Martha Quigley Dillon, Linda Epstein, Ellie Schnabel
1994	Ida Lewis Yacht Club	Becky Wilson, Lisa Merrifield, Trice Kilroy, Alix Barton
1993	Manhasset Bay Yacht Club	Beth Danilek, Sue Miller, Janet Grapengeter, Nancy Pearson
1992	Buffalo Canoe Club	Jody Swanson, Cory Sertl, Abby Ruhlman
1991	Newport Yacht Club	Betsy Alison, Betsy McClintock, Marshall Lawson
1990	Newport Yacht Club	Betsy Alison, Kristan McClintock, Liz Merrifield, Nancy Hood
1989	Buffalo Canoe Club	Jody Swanson, Jill Swanson, Kathryn Ritchie
1988	Seattle Yacht Club	Carol Buchan, Cheryl Lanzinger, Libby Johnson, Jean Trucano
1987	Seattle Yacht Club	Carol Buchan, Cheryl Lanzinger, Libby Johnson, Jean Trucano
1986	South Atlantic Yacht Racing Association	Cathy Chrisman, Ann Boyd, Carolyn Griffith, Janet Scarborough
1985	Chesapeake Bay Yacht Racing Association	Cory Fisher, Dina Horwitz, Ramsey Murray, Joan Watts
1984	Barnegat Bay Yacht Racing Association	Betsy Gelenitis, Ellen Reago, Linda Toboada, Patti Jeske
1983	Vermilion Boat Club	Heidi Backus, Gretchen B. Loper, Amy B. Riddle, Susan B. Potter
1982	Vermilion Boat Club	Heidi Backus, Gretchen B. Loper, Amy B. Riddle
1981	Charleston Yacht Club	Ann Boyd Sloger, Carolyn Simmons, Cathy Chrisman, Janet Scarborough
1980	Bay-Waveland Yacht Club	Judy McKinney, Charlotte Gordon, Amy Chapman
1979	St. Petersburg Yacht Club	Allison Jolly, Susan Blaketer, Janice Robertson, Sue Reischmann
1978	Ida Lewis Yacht Club	Bonnie Shore, Yvonne Burns, Bea Grimmitt, Nancy Kaull
1977	Bay-Waveland Yacht Club	Cindy Stieffel, Amy Chapman, Judy McKinney
1976	Galveston Bay, CA	Ellen Gerloff, Ruthie Maudlin, Jane Baldridge, Rita Matthews
1975	Pettipaug Yacht Club	Cindy S. Batchelor, Nan Hull, Carmen Wetmore, Cara Worthington
1974	Beachwood Yacht Club	Deborah Freeman, Lynn Campbell, Jennifer Valdes
1973	Seawanhaka Corinthian Yacht Club	Timothea Larr, Sheila McCurdy, Beegie Miller
1972	Dinghy Club	Sally Lindsay, Alix Smullin, Nancy Hearne
1971	Duxbury Yacht Club	Sylvia Shethar Everdell, Pamela O'Day, Mrs. Horace Sawyer, Jr., Daphne Fogg
1970	Mantoloking Yacht Club	Jan O'Malley, Patricia O'Malley, Connie Blaise
1969	Mantoloking Yacht Club	Jan O'Malley, Patricia O'Malley, Jacqueline Hart
1968	Monmouth Boat Club	June Methot, Bette Power, Dede Heron
1967	Indian Harbor Yacht Club	Mrs. W.H. Foulk, Jr., Mrs. Albert G. Preston, Jr., Mrs. A. Whittemore, Sue Ann Shay
1966	Corinthian Yacht Club of Seattle	Jerie Clark, Mary Anne Easter, Renate McVitti
1965	Seawanhaka Corinthian Yacht Club	Timothea Larr, Sarah Glenn Meyer, Patience Outerbridge
1964	Lake Geneva Yacht Club	Jane Pegel, Marnie Frank, Nancy Frank
1963	American Yacht Club	Allegra Knapp Mertz, Lois Shethar Smith, Betty Duncan, Lucia Elmore
1962	Noroton Yacht Club	Susan W. Sinclair, Alexandra W. Falconer, Carolyn McCurdy
1961	Seawanhaka Corinthian Yacht Club	Timothea Larr, Sarah Glenn Meyer, Deborah Smith Read
1960	Delray Beach (FL) Yacht Club	Pat Duane, Nancie Pearce, Rose Marie Altemus
1959	American Yacht Club	Allegra Knapp Mertz, Roseamund Corwin, Betty Duncan, Cindy Matthews
1958	American Yacht Club	Nancy Underhill, Roseamund Corwin, Gwendolyn Everett
1957	Chicago Yacht Club	Jane Pegel, Michael Sennot Roche, Judy Gale Nye
1956	Fort Worth Boat Club	Glenn Hill Lattimore, Diane McFarland, Rose Rector, Jane Mooney
1955	Manhasset Bay Yacht Club	Toni Monetti, Chris Drake, Frances Macy, Jill Thompson
1954	American Yacht Club	Allegra Knapp Mertz, Beverly Compton, Ellen Kelly
1953	Riverside Yacht Club	Judy Webb, Barbara Sheldon, Sandra Gill, Jill Avers
1952	Manhasset Bay Yacht Club	Pat Hinman, Toni Monetti, Gwen Van Hagen, Mrs. George R. Hinman
1951	Seal Harbor Yacht Club	Jane Smith, Molly Shaw, Polly Hessenbrunch, Anne Rockefeller
1950	American Yacht Club	Allegra Knapp Mertz, Roseamund Corwin, Carol Walter, Beverly Compton
1949	Portland Yacht Club	Jane McL. Smith, Jane Hughes, Dana Smith, Martha Soule
1948	Larchmont Yacht Club	Aileen Bryan, Grace Emmons, Margot Gotte, JoAnne Sandborn
1947	American Yacht Club	Syvia Shethar Everdell, Roseamund Corwin, Lois Shethar, Allegra Knapp Mertz
1946	Edgartown Yacht Club	Virginia Weston Besse, Adelaide Wolstanholme, Honora Haynes, Mary Edmonds
1941	Riverside Yacht Club	Lois McIntyre, Mrs. Frederick T. Allen, Charlotte Mayer, Mrs. Carlton Marsh
1940	American Yacht Club	Sylvia Shethar, Roseamund Corwin, Elizabeth Richards
1939	American Yacht Club	Sylvia Shethar, Gwendolyn Shethar, Roseamund Corwin, Elizabeth Richards
1938	Cohasset Yacht Club	Francis McElwain, Katherin Johnson Fisher, Joan Chapin Waters, Barbara Benson
1937	Cohasset Yacht Club	Francis McElwain, Katherine Johnson, Francis Williams, Joan Chapin Waters
1936	Cohasset Yacht Club	Francis McElwain, Katherine Johnson, Joan Chapin
1935	Cohasset Yacht Club	Francis McElwain, Katherine Johnson, Francis Williams
1934	Indian Harbor Yacht Club	Lorna Whittelsey, Myrtle Whittelsey, Mrs. DuBois, Kitty Kunhardt
1933	Cohasset Yacht Club	Ruth Sears, Katherine Johnson, Francis Williams
1932	Edgartown Yacht Club	Clara Dinsmore, Jeanne Sargent, Dorothy Morrell
1931	Indian Harbor Yacht Club	Lorna Whittelsey, Helen Willis, Myrtle Whittelsey
1930	Indian Harbor Yacht Club	Lorna Whittelsey, Helen Willis, Myrtle Whittelsey
1929	Cohasset Yacht Club	Frances Williams, Fanny C. Howmans, Peggy Little
1928	Indian Harbor Yacht Club	Lorna Whittelsey, Helen Wills, Edith Wills
1927	Indian Harbor Yacht Club	Lorna Whittelsey, Helen Wills, Edith Wills
1926	Cohasset Yacht Club	Jessie Bancroft, Catherine Reid, Helen Swain
1925	Cohasset Yacht Club	Ruth Sears, Ester Sears
1924	Cohasset Yacht Club	Ruth Sears, Ester Sears
