= Sue Sinclair (sailor) =

American sailor (1932–2020)

Personal information
- Born: 1932; Brooklyn, New York
- Died: July 5, 2020; Darien, CT

Sailing career
- Club: Noroton Yacht Club

Susan Widmann Sinclair (also known as Mrs. David Sinclair) was an American sailor who won the 1962 Women's National Sailing Championship and was the 1962 U.S. Sailor of the Year.

== Sailing history ==
Sinclair learned to sail at the Noroton Yacht Club and later went on to lead the junior sailing program at Riverside Yacht Club. In 1962, she raced in Lightnings to win the Syce Cup, the Long Island Sound Women's Championship now called the Queen's Cup, beating out the previous champion Timothea Larr. This win qualified her for the national championship. Sinclair sailed with her sister Alexandra Falconer and Carolyn McCurdy in Coral Gables, Florida to win the 1962 United States' Women's National Sailing Championship, the Mrs. Charles Francis Adams Trophy. Sinclair continued to win racers and in 1963 she won the Stamford Yacht Club regatta, sailing with her sister Alexandra Falconer and Katie Morgan. In later years, she sailed Lightnings, Tempests, J/24s, and Sonars.

== Awards and honors ==
Sinclair earned the Martini and Rossi Trophy in 1962, now called the Rolex Award, for the United States Sailor of the Year.

== Personal life ==
Sinclair was a teacher educated at the National Louis University in Illinois. She taught school at Henry Street Settlement in New York City, and later at the Brunswick School in Connecticut. She married David Macowan Sinclair on July 14, 1956, in Noroton, Connecticut.
