= Betty Foulk =

American sailor

Personal information
- Birth name: Mary Elizabeth Weed

Sailing career
- Club: Indian Harbor Yacht Club

Mary Elizabeth "Betty" Weed Foulk was an American sailor who was a multiple time winner of the Syce Cup. She won the 1967 Mrs. Charles Francis Adams Trophy and was the 1967 United States Sailor of the Year.

== Sailing career ==
Foulk, formerly known as Betty Weed, was born in New York City and learned to sail at Larchmont Yacht Club. She graduated from Rosemary Hall School in Greenwich, Connecticut in 1955 and then attended Wheaton College.

In 1967 Foulk won the Syce Cup, the championship for women sailors in Long Island Sound. She beat Timothea Larr by three-quarters of a point. Her crew in 1967 included Mrs. Josephine Whitmore, Sue Ann Shay, and Dorothy Preston. Foulk won the Syce Cup again in 1968 and 1969.

In 1967 Foulk won the Mrs. Charles Francis Adams Trophy when races were held on Lake Ontario near Rochester, New York.

== Awards and honors ==
In 1967 Foulk received the Martini & Rossi trophy, thereby becoming the United States' sailor of the year along with Emil Mosbacher. In 2012, Choate Rosemary Hall inducted her into their athletic hall of fame. Foulk also received an award from the North American Riding for the Handicapped Association in 2012.

== Personal life ==
She married William H. Foulk Jr. in 1960, and together they had two children. Foulk died on 11 February 2015.
