= Indian Harbor Yacht Club =

American yacht club

Coordinates: 41.0128°N 73.6227°W

- Burgee
- Founded: 1889
- Location: 710 Steamboat Road, Greenwich, Connecticut, US 06830
- Website: www.indianharboryc.com

- Indian Harbor Yacht Club
- U.S. National Register of Historic Places
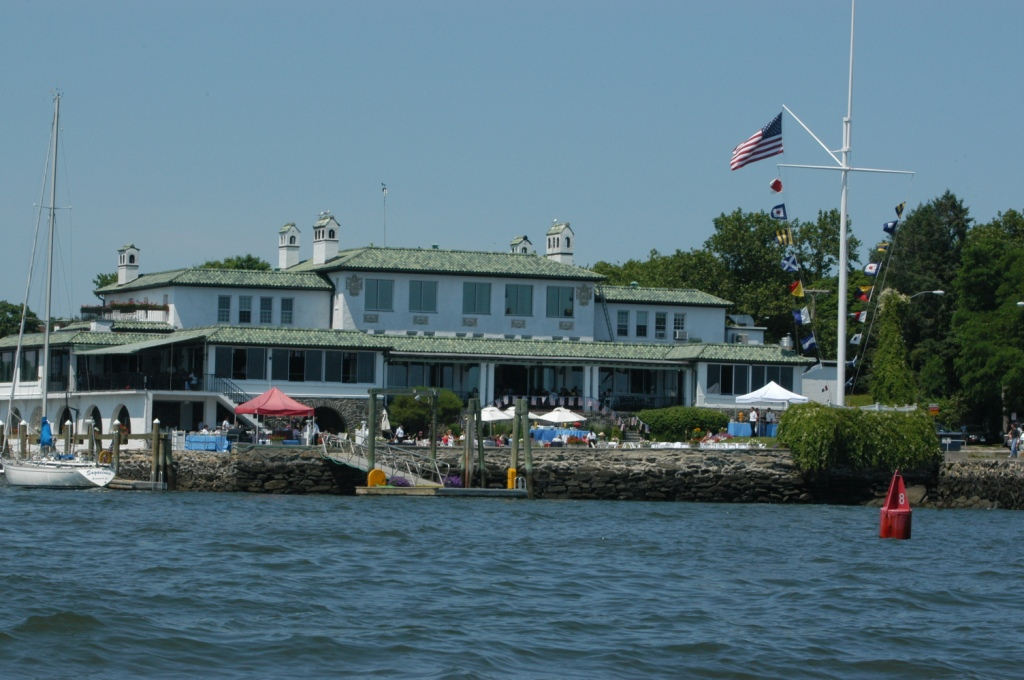
- Clubhouse of the Indian Harbor Yacht Club today

- Location within Connecticut
- Location: 710 Steamboat Rd, Greenwich, Connecticut
- Area: 1 acre (0.40 ha)
- Built: 1920
- Architect: Pelton, Henry
- Architectural style: Mission/spanish Revival
- NRHP reference No.: 10000494
- Added to NRHP: July 22, 2010

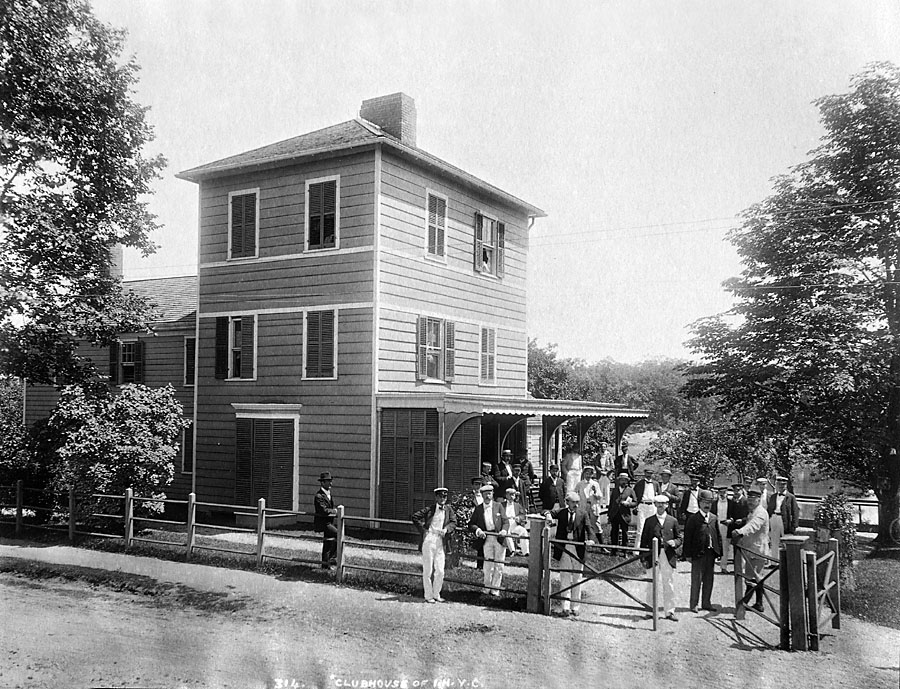
Clubhouse of the Indian Harbor Yacht Club, as it appeared in the 1890s. Photo by John S. Johnston.

The Indian Harbor Yacht Club is a private yacht club in Greenwich, Connecticut, with a long and storied yachting tradition. The club, founded in 1889 in New York City by a group of prominent sportsmen, is based mainly around personally owned yachts and pleasure boats, but also has a long history of competitive races. The members have contributed to the sport of yachting and yacht design. The New York Times noted that "Indian Harbor ranks among the most influential institutions of its kind in the country." Membership in the club is by invitation only.

== History ==
On July 1, 1889, under the leadership of Frank Bowne Jones, Richard Outwater, Henry S. Doremus, Charles J. Hart and others, the Indian Harbor Yacht Club came into being, rising from the ashes of the old Greenwich Yacht Club. The particular business was originally stated as, "Shall be to encourage and support the sport of yachting, the art of yacht designing and building, and the science of seamanship and navigation." Later, when incorporated, the following words were added: "and to provide for the amusement and recreation of its members."

This was primarily a sailing club and Henry E. Doremus was the first Commodore, William Ross Proctor the Vice Commodore, and Charles J. Hart the Rear Commodore. The club's first headquarters were in New York, and in 1892 it leased Finch's Island in Greenwich as its sailing base. The present property was developed in 1895 by Commodore Charles T. Wills, and the clubhouse dates to 1921. It is an unusual example of Mediterranean Revival design, by architect Henry Pelton, then a member of the club's race committee.

Prior to World War II, huge steamers and two- and three-masted schooners crowded the channel to the west of the club and the harbor area to the south. While there are two large ketches – both over 100 feet – still on the Indian Harbor roster, they would have been small compared with the 233-foot schooner Migrant or the 243-foot steamer Aras, which were registered at Indian Harbor in the 1930's and were representative of their day.

Indian Harbor Yacht Club has recorded more entries in the Newport Bermuda Race than any other yacht club in the world. Indian Harbor members were part of the crew of the Intrepid during its America's Cup victories in 1967 and 1970.

In 1989, as part of the Club's centennial celebrations, Indian Harbor Yacht Club published 'A Century of sailing : the first one hundred years of the Indian Harbor Yacht Club, 1889–1989' The club's facilities on Steamboat Road were listed on the National Register of Historic Places in 2010. The designation was in recognition of the club's importance in the realm of racing and yachting, as well as for the architecture of its clubhouse.

The club is a founding member of the National Sailing Hall of Fame.

== Notable Members ==
- Thomas Watson Jr.
- Dick Nye
- Elias Cornelius Benedict
- George Lauder (Scottish industrialist)
- Edward J. Noble
- Clifford D. Mallory

== See also ==
- National Register of Historic Places listings in Greenwich, Connecticut
