= Jane Pegel =

American sailor (1933–2026)

Jane Wiswell Pegel
Personal information
- Born: June 28, 1933 Elkhorn, Wisconsin, U.S.
- Died: June 6, 2026 (aged 92) Lake Geneva, Wisconsin, U.S.

Sailing career
- Sport: Sailing
- College team: University of Wisconsin
- Club: Skeeter Ice Boat Club; Lake Geneva Yacht Club

Jane Wiswell Pegel (June 28, 1933 – June 6, 2026) was an American sailor, on water and on ice, who was elected into the United States' National Sailing Hall of Fame in 2021.

== Sailing history ==
Pegel grew up on Williams Bay in Wisconsin and graduated from Williams Bay High School in 1961. She learned ice boat racing in a Skeeter and in her first race in 1948, she recalled being first to the wind mark, but then not being able to finish because she did not know how to sail downwind. In 1957, she changed to the International DN ice boat. In 1960, she became the first woman to win the annual International DN championship and she won her first North American championship in the class; she won again in 1963. While Pegel sometimes skis, during a 1965 interview published in Sports Illustrated, she noted

...one day of iceboating and you're ready to burn your skis

— Jane Pegel

In the summer, Pegel races in the M-16 Scow class at the Lake Geneva Yacht Club where she has also been involved in the junior program as an instructor and as President of the board of directors. In 1957 and again in 1964, Pegel won the Mrs. Charles Francis Adams Trophy, the United States' Women's Sailing Championship. She won the United States' Women's Singlehanded championship, the Allegra Knapp Mertz trophy, in 1974 and was named US Sailor of the Year three times (1964, 1971, 1972). She also raced, and won championships, in the X Class, C Scow, M Scow and DN Ice boat classes.

== Personal life and death ==
Pegel's husband, Bob Pegel, was also a sailor and they raced together in the E Scow class, splitting the skippering duties between the upwind and downwind legs. They ran a shop where they restored vintage ice boats so they were ready to be sailed. She graduated from the University of Wisconsin–Madison in 1955.

Pegel died in Lake Geneva, Wisconsin, on June 6, 2026, at the age of 92.

== Awards ==
In 2008, Pegel was elected to the Inland Lake Yachting Association Hall of Fame. Pegel was elected into the United States' National Sailing Hall of Fame in 2021.
