= Aileen Bryan =

American sailor (1925–2005)

Personal information
- Born: April 4, 1925 New Rochelle, New York, U.S.
- Died: November 29, 2005 (aged 80)

Sailing career
- Sport: Sailing

Aileen Shields Bryan (April 4, 1925 – November 29, 2005) was an American sailor who won the 1948 United States' women's national sailing championship.

== Sailing history ==
Bryan was born in New Rochelle, New York. Her mother was Josephine Shields and her father was Cornelius Shields, the sailor after whom the Shields sailboat was named. She went to Rye Country Day School, St. Margaret's School, and finally the Berkeley-Llewelyn Business School.

The New York Times covered a successful day of sailing when she was six years old and won three races of the day with her father crewing for her, thereby winning as many races as when she crewed for him. Her father eventually named his boat Aileen after her. In 1938, Bryan sailed with Allegra Mertz during her win for the Syce Cup trophy, the women's Long Island Sound championship; she was 13 at the time and the youngest competitor of the event.

Bryan won the Mrs. Charles Francis Adams Trophy, the United States' Women's National Sailing Championship, in 1948. After this win, Margo Gotte and Bryan published an article in Yacht Racing magazine that was called “How to Win a Sailboat Race”. She also won class championships in other sailboats include the Atlantic and 210 classes.

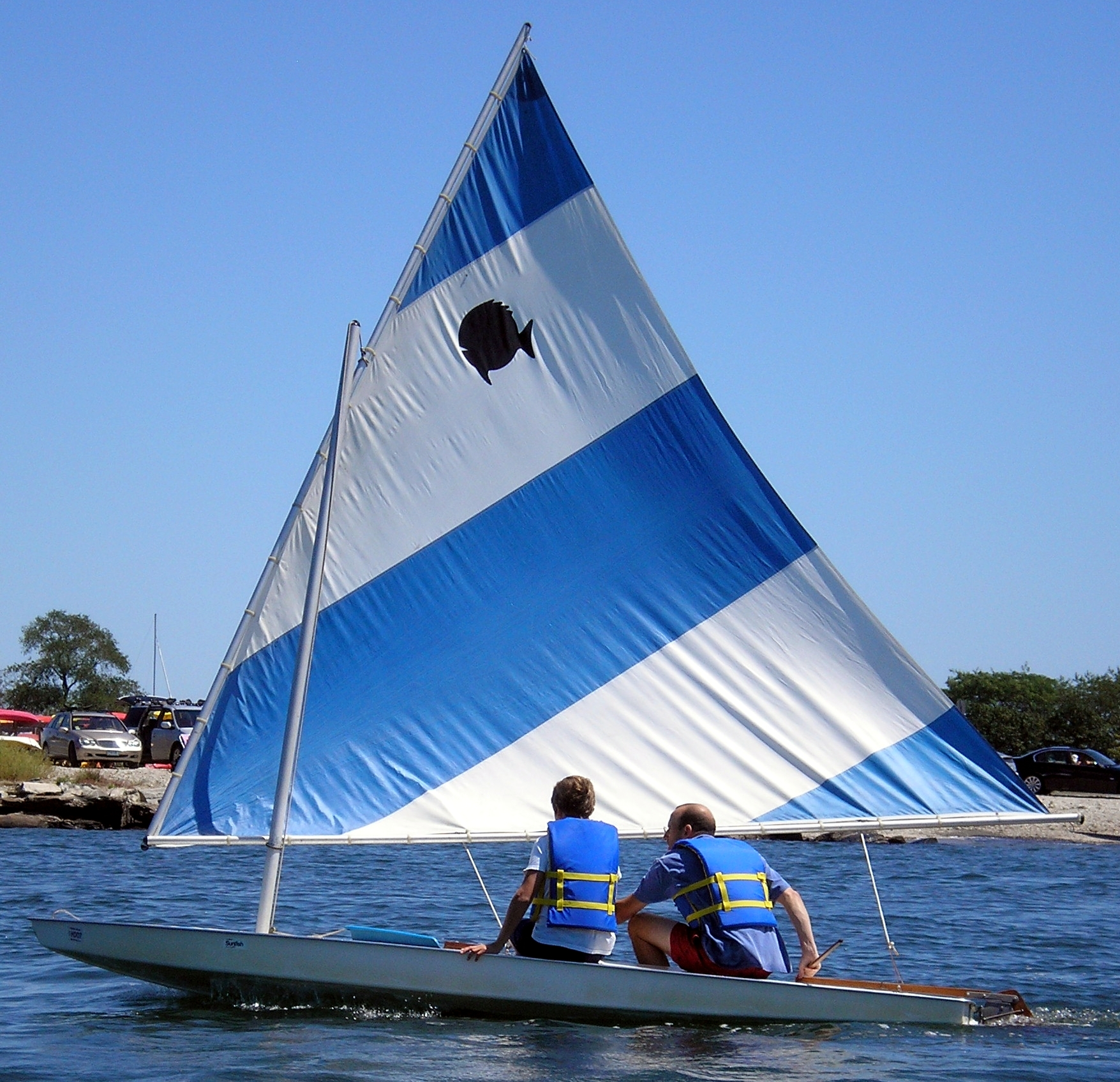
Bryan was instrumental in the development of the Sunfish

Bryan played a key role in the design of the Sunfish. Her husband, Alexander Bryan, and Cortlandt Heyniger designed its predecessor, the Sailfish. She encouraged them to build a boat that had a cockpit where she could place her feet and allowed her to sit sideways while steering. This led to the development of the Sunfish, which was inducted into the American Sailboat Hall of Fame in 1995.

== Awards and honors ==
Bryan is a nominee to the United States' National Sailing Hall of Fame.
