= Adams Cup =

Adams Cup may refer to:

- Adams Cup (ice hockey), an ice hockey trophy in the United States
- Mrs. Charles Frances Adams Cup, a sailing trophy in the United States

== See also ==
- Jack Adams Award, given to the National Hockey League's coach of the year
