= Jerie Clark =

American sailor

Personal information
- Born: Jerie Burchard

Sailing career
- Sport: Sailing

Jerie Burchard Clark is an American sailor who was named US Sailor of the Year in 1966.

== Sailing history ==
Clark began sailing with her parents, Boyd and Bonnie Burchard, when she was two years old. She grew up racing boats, even wishing to race on a Wednesday night rather than attend her high school graduation.

In 1966, Clark won North American Women's sailing championship. She sailed with Renate McVittie and Mary Anne Easter, and they were first women from the west coast to win this event which is also known as the Mrs. Charles Francis Adams Trophy. Clark had previously competed in the event in 1960 as crew for Rae Ellen Syverson where they finished third; in 1962 she skippered a Lightening to a 7th-place finish. Clark finished second in the 1970 Adams Cup races held in Victoria, British Columbia.

In addition to racing, Clark also taught sailing in the Seattle area.

== Awards and honors ==
Clark was elected US Sailor of the Year in 1966.

== Personal life ==
She met her future husband, Robert Donovan Clark while sailing at the University of Washington. They were married in 1962. They sailed Lightnings together, winning multiple regattas in the class.
