= US Sailor of the Year Awards =

The US Sailor of the Year Awards are presented every year by the United States Sailing Association to one male and one female winner since 1961. They are considered the sport’s ultimate recognition of an individual’s outstanding on-the-water achievements for the calendar year in the United States.

Since 1980, the awards are sponsored by Rolex and named US Sailing’s Rolex Yachtsman and Yachtswoman of the Year Awards

== History ==
List of winners:

Year	Male winner(s)	Female winner(s)
1961	Buddy Melges	Timothea Schneider
1962	Emil Mosbacher	Sue Sinclair
1963	Joseph Duplin	Leggie Mertz
1964	Bob Bavier	Jane Pegel
1965	Dick Tillman	Timothea (Schneider) Larr
1966	Bill Cox	Jerie Clark
1967	Emil Mosbacher	Betty Foulk
1968	Lowell North	June Methot
1969	Robert F. Johnson	Jan O'Malley
1970	Ted Turner	Jan O'Malley
1971	Ding Schoonmaker	Jane Pegel
1972	Buddy Melges	Jane Pegel
1973	Ted Turner	Sally Lindsay
1974	Ted Hood	Sally Lindsay
1975	Dennis Conner	Joan Ellis
1976	Lowell North	Allison Jolly
1977	Ted Turner	Jan O'Malley
1978	Buddy Melges	Bonnie Shore
1979	Ted Turner	Nell Taylor
1980	Dennis Conner	Lynne Jewell
1981	Dave Curtis	Betsy Gelenitis
1982	Randy Smyth	Betsy Gelenitis
1983	Dave Curtis	Wendy Thomson
1984	William Carl Buchan	Betsy Gelenitis
1985	Ken Read	Kathy Steele & Heidi Backus
1986	Dennis Conner	J. J. Isler
1987	Ed Adams	Susan Dierdorff Taylor
1988	John Kostecki	Allison Jolly & Lynne Jewell
1989	Larry Klein	Jody Swanson
1990	Jim Brady	Courtenay Becker-Dey
1991	Ed Adams	J. J. Isler
1992	Kevin Mahaney	Julia Trotman
1993	Cam Lewis	Betsy (Gelenitis) Alison
1994	Ken Read	Danielle Brennan
1995	Ed Baird	Cory Sertl
1996	David Ullman	Courtenay Becker-Dey
1997	Chris Larson	J. J. Isler
1998	Paul Cayard	Betsy (Gelenitis) Alison
1999	Eric Doyle	Dawn Riley
2000	Mark Reynolds & Magnus Liljedahl	J. J. Isler & Sarah Glaser
2001	Steve Fossett	Cory Sertl
2002	John Kostecki	Liz Baylis
2003	Augie Diaz	Hannah Swett
2004	Paul Foerster & Kevin Burnham	Jody Swanson
2005	Nick Scandone	Sally Barkow
2006	Jud Smith	Paige Railey
2007	Jeff Linton	Sally Barkow
2008	Terry Hutchinson	Anna Tunnicliffe
2009	Bora Gulari	Anna Tunnicliffe
2010	Stan Honey	Anna Tunnicliffe
2011	Bill Hardesty	Anna Tunnicliffe
2012	John Heineken	Jen French
2013	Brian Porter	Jody Starck
2014	Terry Hutchinson	Stephanie Roble
2015	Steve Benjamin	Annie Haeger
2016	Caleb Paine	Daniela Moroz
2017	Peter Duncan	Erika Reineke
2018	Jud Smith	Carmen Cowles & Emma Cowles
2019	Mike Martin & Adam Lowry	Daniela Moroz
2021	Harry Melges IV	Daniela Moroz
2022	Ravi Parent	Daniela Moroz
2023	Charlie Enright	Christina Wolfe
2024	Ian Barrows & Hans Henken	Cole Brauer
2025	Paul Cayard	Laura Grondin
