= Allegra Mertz =

American sailor

Personal information
- Nickname: Leggie
- Born: Allegra Knapp; 1913
- Died: July 9, 1989 (aged 75–76)

Sailing career
- Sport: Sailing

Allegra ("Leggie") Knapp Brickell Mertz (1913-1989) was a four-time United States' women's national sailing champion and the first woman to receive the Nathaneal G. Herreshoff Trophy from US Sailing.

== Sailing history ==
Mertz grew up sailing and a 1954 Sports Illustrated article describes her tenacity and how she encouraged junior sailors. Mertz won regattas in a range of boats including the Moth class, the 210 class, and the Etchells class where she split helm duties with her husband James Mertz. In the International One Design class she won the first IOD trophy in 1937, a silver seashell that is now given as the 'Allegra Trophy' for 2nd place at the IOD World Championship.

Knapp was a four-time winner of the Mrs. Charles Francis Adams Trophy (1950, 1954, 1959, and 1963), which placed her as the United States' women's national sailing champion in those years. She also won the Syce Cup trophy for the women's Long Island Sound championship eight times. Her first win came in 1938 where she sailed with her sister-in-law Dorothy Knapp, Sarah Baylis, and the 13 year old Aileen Shields who was the youngest competitor of the event.

Knapp was a longtime president of the Women's North American Sailing Committee. In 1954 she founded the International Blue Jay Association and was Blue Jay class association president for 24 years. Her husband was also a commodore of the American Yacht Club.

== Awards and honors ==
Mertz was the 1963 US Sailor of the Year and in 1966 was the first woman to win the Nathaneal G. Herreshoff Trophy from US Sailing for "outstanding contribution to the sport of sailing" who highlighted both her contributions as a competitor and administrator, and for encouraging women in sailing. She was named to the International One Design World Class Association hall of fame.

As of 2021, the Allegra Knapp Mertz Trophy is awarded each year to the winning women's match racing team in the United States. Mertz is a nominee to join the National Sailing Hall of Fame.

== Personal life ==
Knapp married James Bain Brickell in 1937 and they had one son, James Brickell. She later married James M. Mertz and they had a daughter, Allegra Mertz.
