= Theodore Robinson =

American painter (1852–1896)

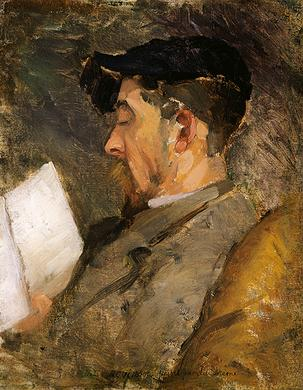
- Theodore Robinson, Self-portrait (c. 1884-1887), collection: Margaret and Raymond Horowitz
- Born: June 3, 1852; Irasburg, Vermont, US
- Died: April 2, 1896 (aged 43); New York City, US
- Education: National Academy of Design, Art Students League of New York, Carolus-Duran, École des Beaux-Arts
- Known for: Painting
- Movement: American Impressionism

Theodore Robinson (June 3, 1852 – April 2, 1896) was an American painter best known for his Impressionist landscapes. He was one of the first American artists to take up Impressionism in the late 1880s, visiting Giverny and developing a close friendship with Claude Monet. Several of his works are considered masterpieces of American Impressionism.

== Training and early career ==
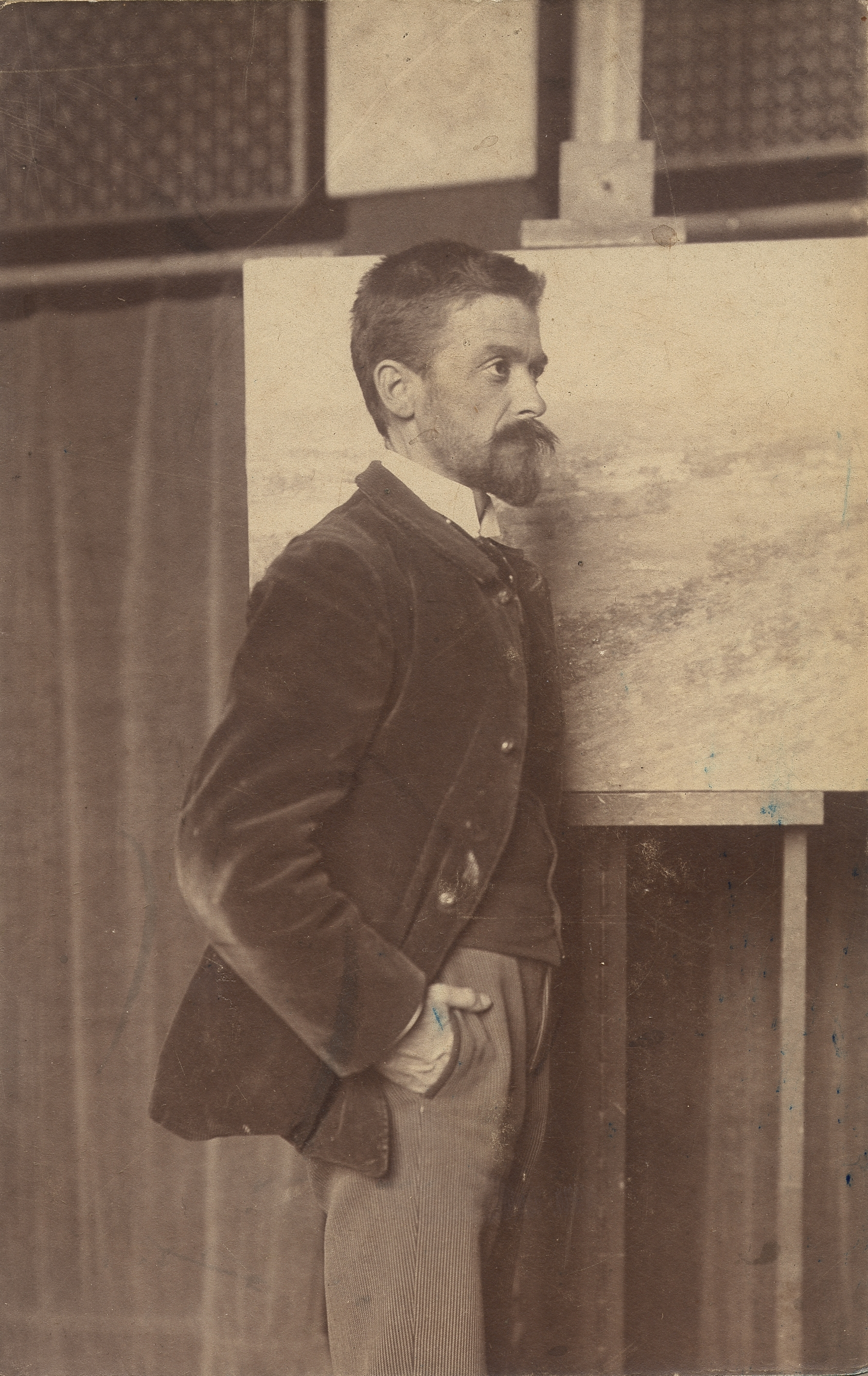
Robinson in 1882

Robinson was born in Irasburg, Vermont. His family moved to Evansville, Wisconsin, and Robinson briefly studied art in Chicago. In 1874 he journeyed to New York City to attend classes at the National Academy of Design and the Art Students League.

In 1876 he traveled to Paris to study under Carolus-Duran and at the École des Beaux-Arts, with Jean-Léon Gérôme. He first exhibited his paintings at the 1877 Salon in Paris, and spent the summer of that year at Grez-sur-Loing.

After trips to Venice and Bologna, he returned to the United States in 1879 for several years. In 1881 he moved into a studio in New York and became a professional painter and art teacher, and in the same year became a member of the Society of American Artists. During this time Robinson painted in a realist manner, loosely brushed but not yet impressionistic, often depicting people engaged in quiet domestic or agrarian pursuits.

== Giverny ==
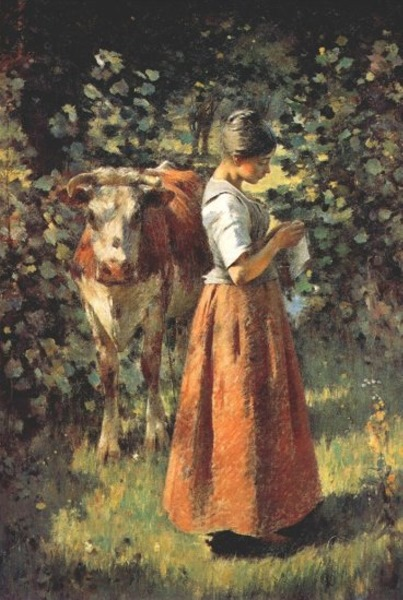
La Vachère (c. 1888) Smithsonian American Art Museum

In 1884 Robinson returned to France where he lived for the next eight years, visiting America only occasionally. Robinson gravitated to Giverny, which had become a center of French impressionist art under the influence of Claude Monet.

Historians are unclear when Robinson met Monet, but by 1888 their friendship was enough for Robinson to move in next door to the famous impressionist. Robinson's art shifted to a more traditional impressionistic manner during this time, likely due to Monet's influence. While a number of American artists had gathered at Giverny, none were as close to Monet as Robinson. Monet offered advice to Robinson, and he likewise solicited Robinson for opinions on Monet's own works in progress.

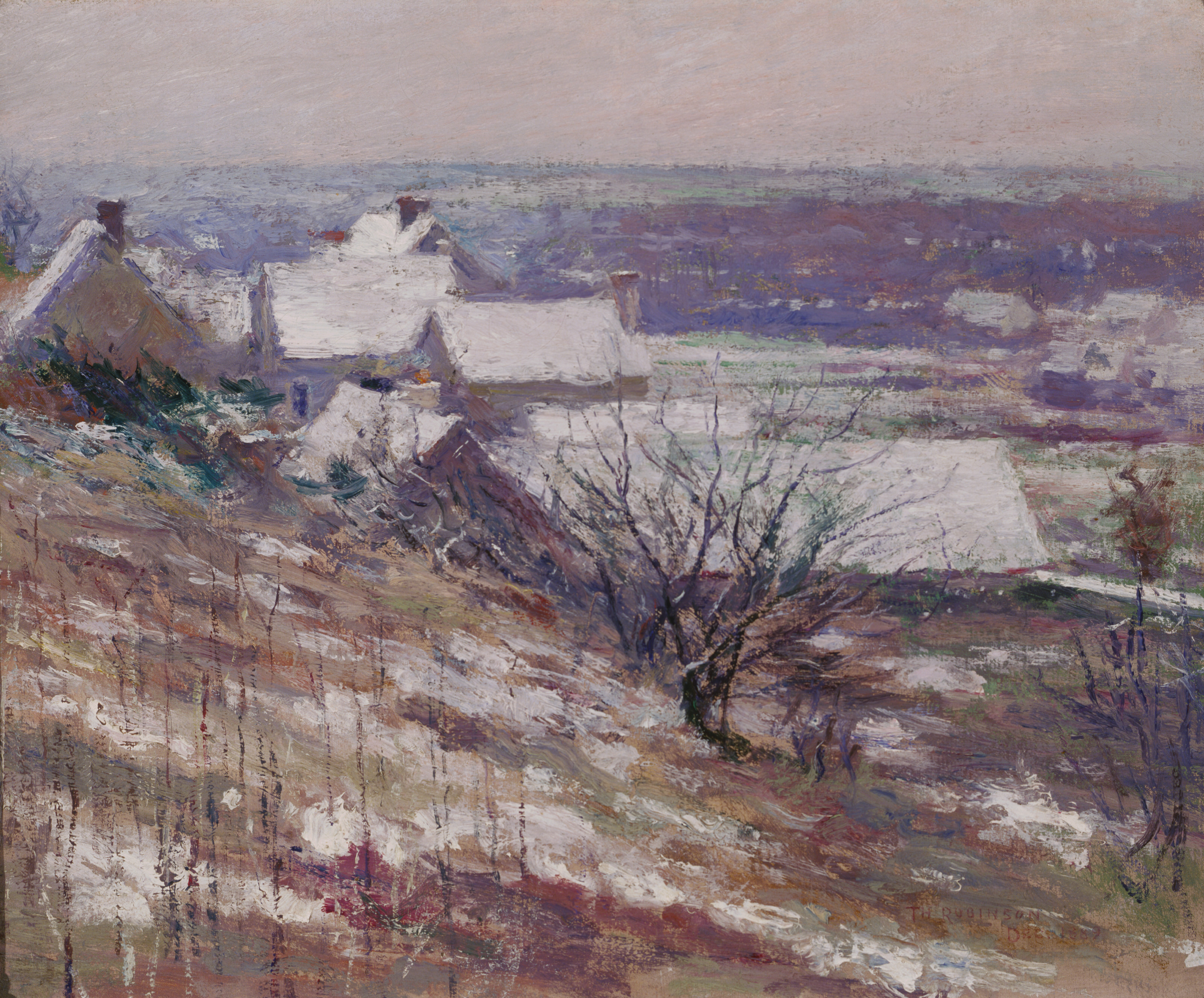
Winter Landscape, 1889

As well as taking to heart Monet´s theoretical admonitions and his requirement to portray the beauties and mystery of nature in a manner stringently truthful to one's personal vision, he also studied works that were available to him in "The Master´s" studio. For instance, Capri, painted in 1890, was probably inspired by Monet´s paintings of the cliffs at Varengeville, Pourville, and Etretat and the rocks at Bell-Ile of the early 1880s.

At Giverny, Robinson painted what art historians regard as some of his finest works. These depicted the surrounding countryside in different weather, in the plein air tradition, sometimes with women shown in leisurely poses. His Winter Landscape won the 1890 Webb Prize. Another example of his mature work during this period is La Débâcle (1892) in the collection of Scripps College, Claremont California.

== Return to America ==
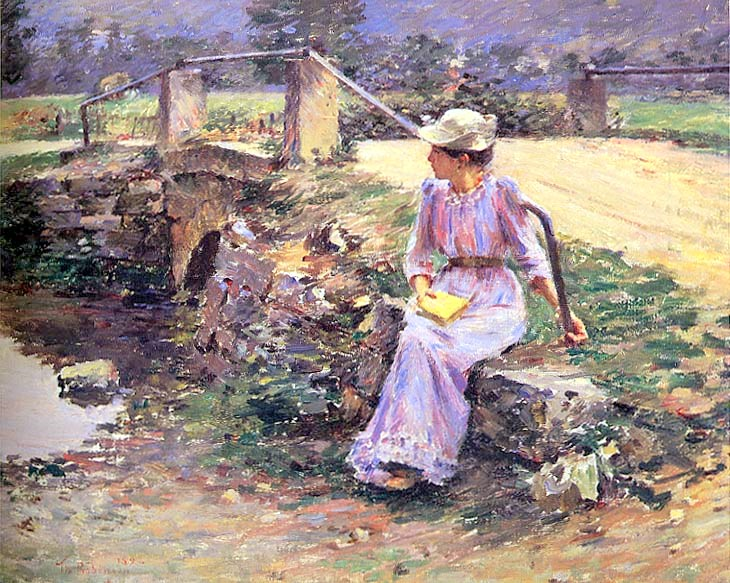
La Débâcle, 1892

Robinson left France and Monet for the final time in 1892, although he meant to return. Back in America, Robinson obtained a teaching post with the Brooklyn Art School and conducted summer classes in Napanoch, New York, near the Catskill Mountains, where he painted several canal scenes. He also taught at Evelyn College in Princeton, New Jersey, and later at the Pennsylvania Academy of the Fine Arts in Philadelphia.

With New York City as his base, Robinson circulated among a growing number of American artists pursuing Impressionism. He was particularly close to John Henry Twachtman and Julian Alden Weir, and spent time at the nearby Cos Cob Art Colony in Connecticut. There he painted a series of boat scenes at the Riverside Yacht Club which have come to be regarded as among his finest works.

While his reputation as an important American Impressionist was growing, Robinson still needed to teach to support himself. He also harbored doubts about the quality of his work.

Throughout his career, Theodore Robinson kept meticulous diaries, but only the last several years of the diaries are known to exist. These are in the collection of the Frick Art Reference Library in New York and available to scholars. The art historian Sona Johnson, of the Baltimore Museum of Art, plans to publish an annotated edition of the Robinson diaries.

== Final years ==
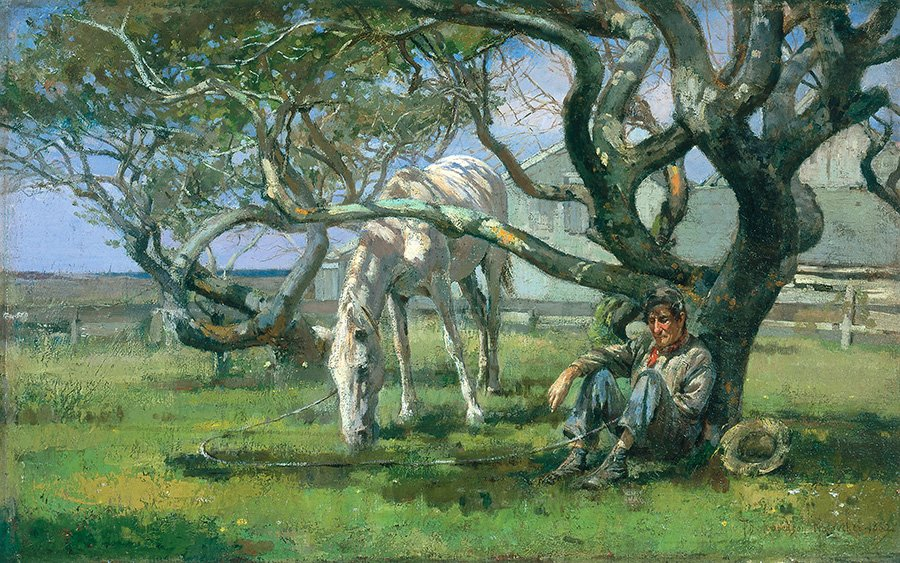
Nantucket, 1882

In the last year of his life he was asked to contribute to the book of essays titled Modern French Masters by the editor and art historian John Charles Van Dyke. He wrote an essay on the Barbizon painter Jean-Baptiste-Camille Corot and, because of his friendship with the French Impressionist, he wrote and illustrated the essay on Claude Monet. The book was published in 1896 and his illustration of Monet was featured in the exhibition "In Monet's Light."

In 1895, Robinson enjoyed a productive period in Vermont, and in February 1896 he wrote to Monet about returning to Giverny, but in April he died of an acute asthma attack in New York City. He was buried in his hometown of Evansville, Wisconsin. He was 43 years old.

Today Robinson's paintings are in the collections of many major museums including the Metropolitan Museum of Art in New York City; the Corcoran Gallery of Art, Washington, D.C.; and the Art Institute of Chicago.

== Artwork gallery ==
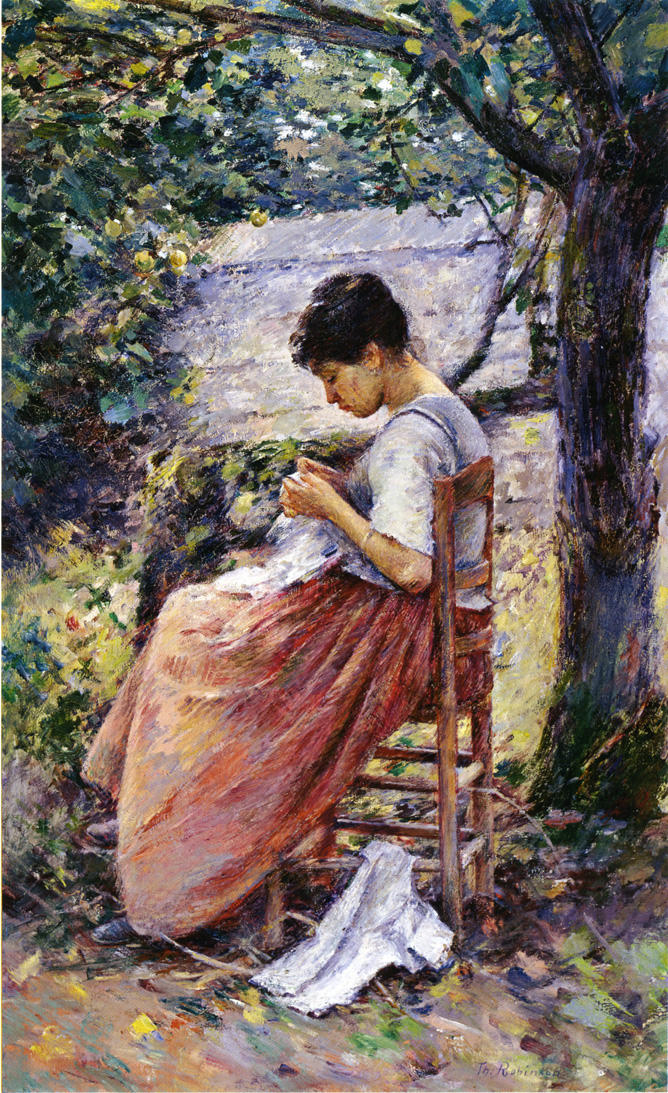
The Layette, (1882)

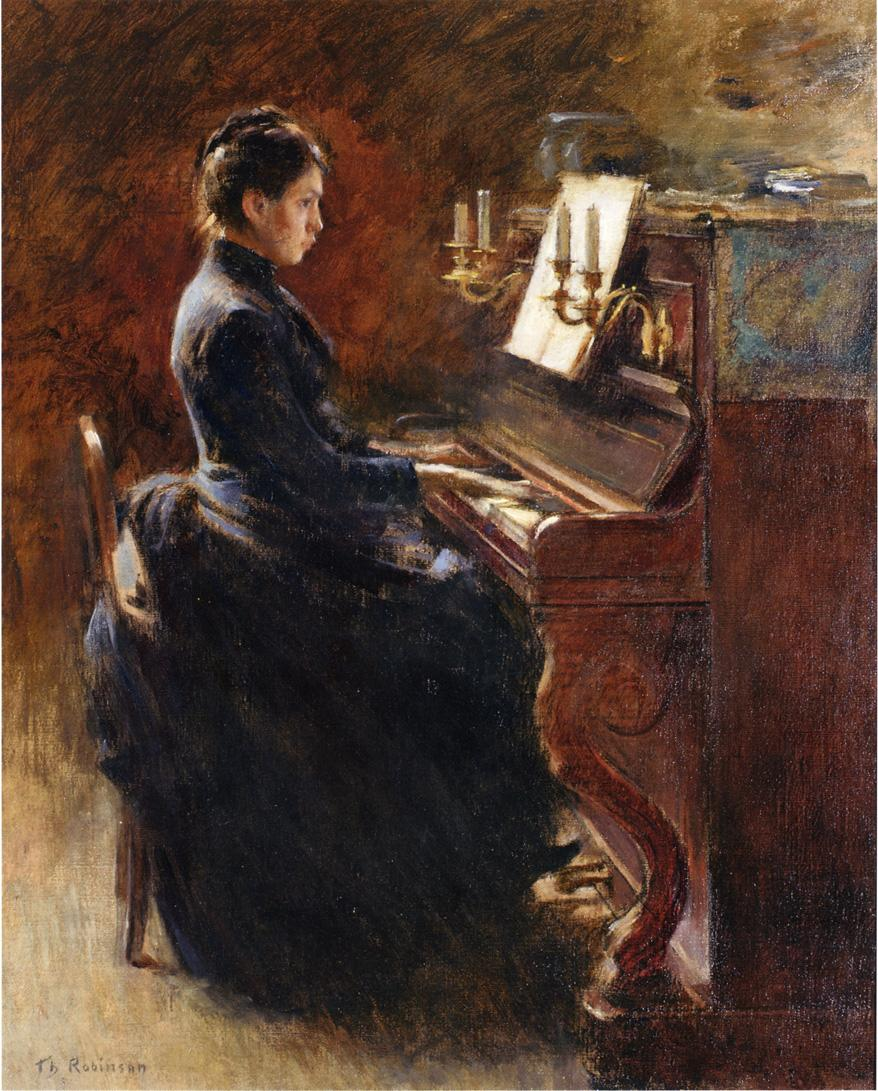
Girl at Piano, (c. 1887)

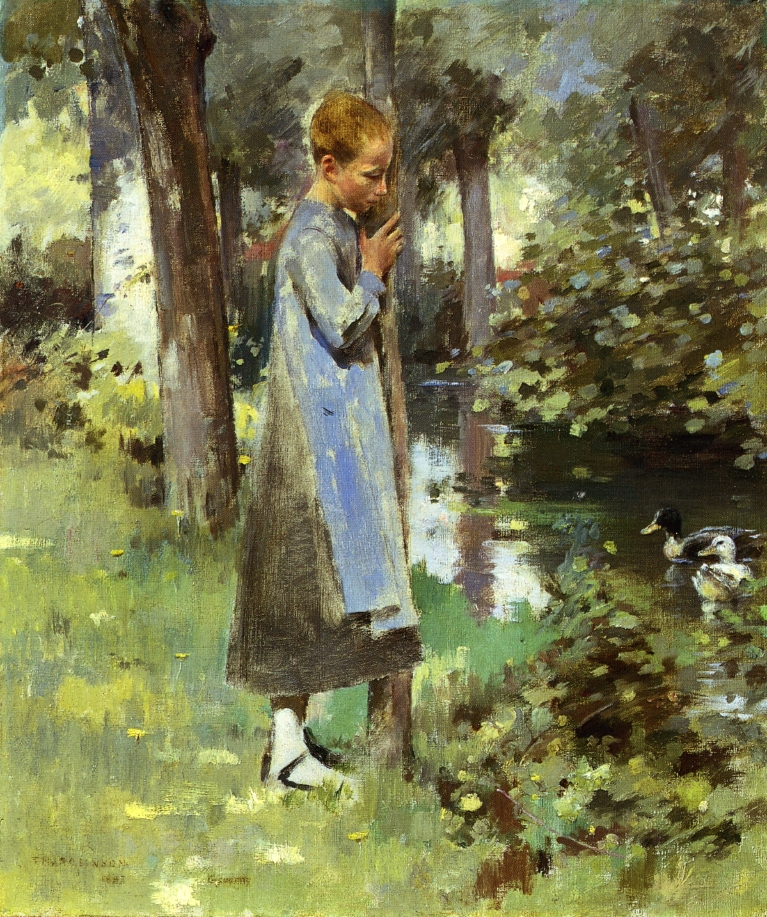
By the River, (1887)

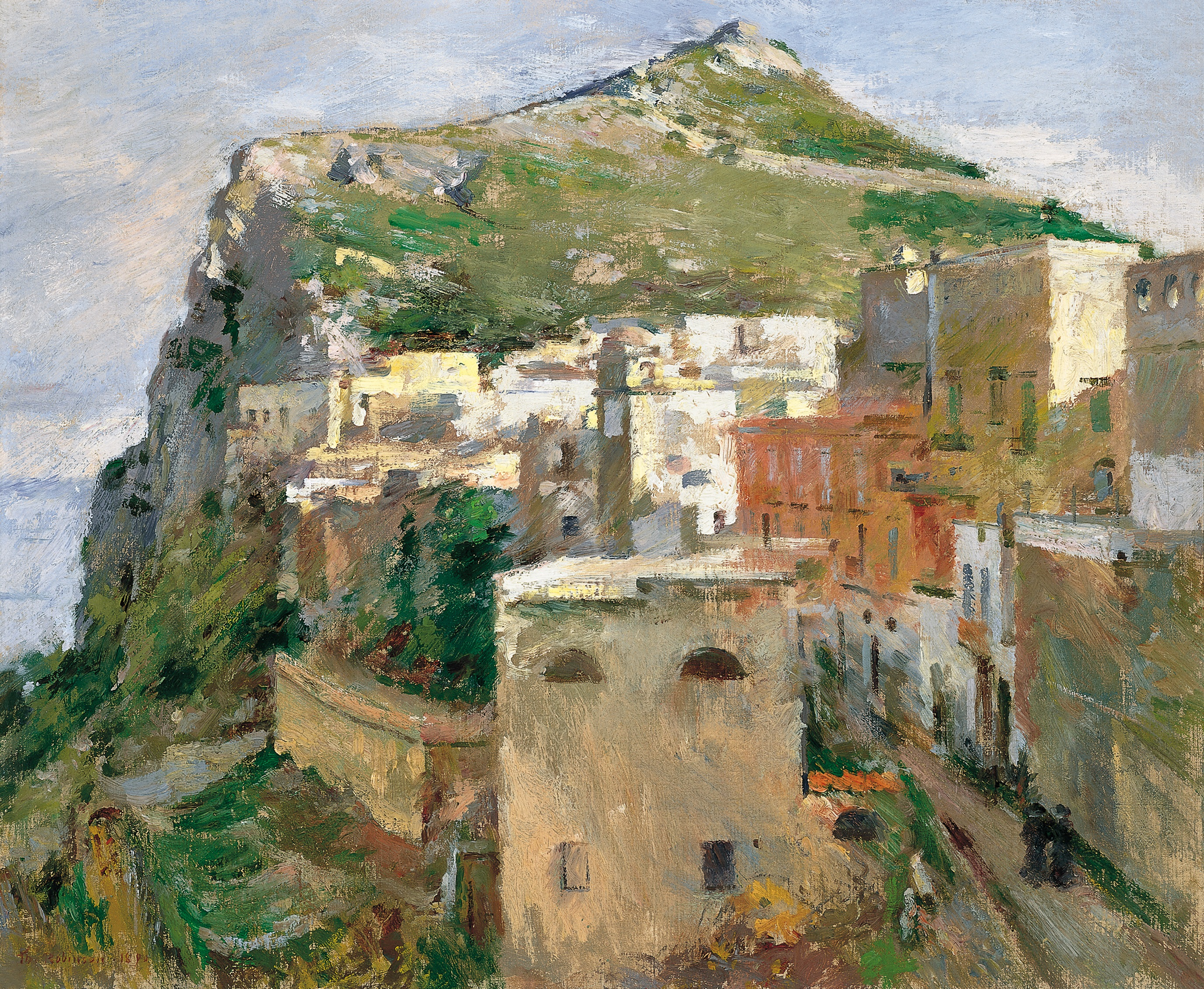
Capri, 1890, Collection Carmen Thyssen-Bornemisza, Thyssen-Bornemisza Museum, Madrid

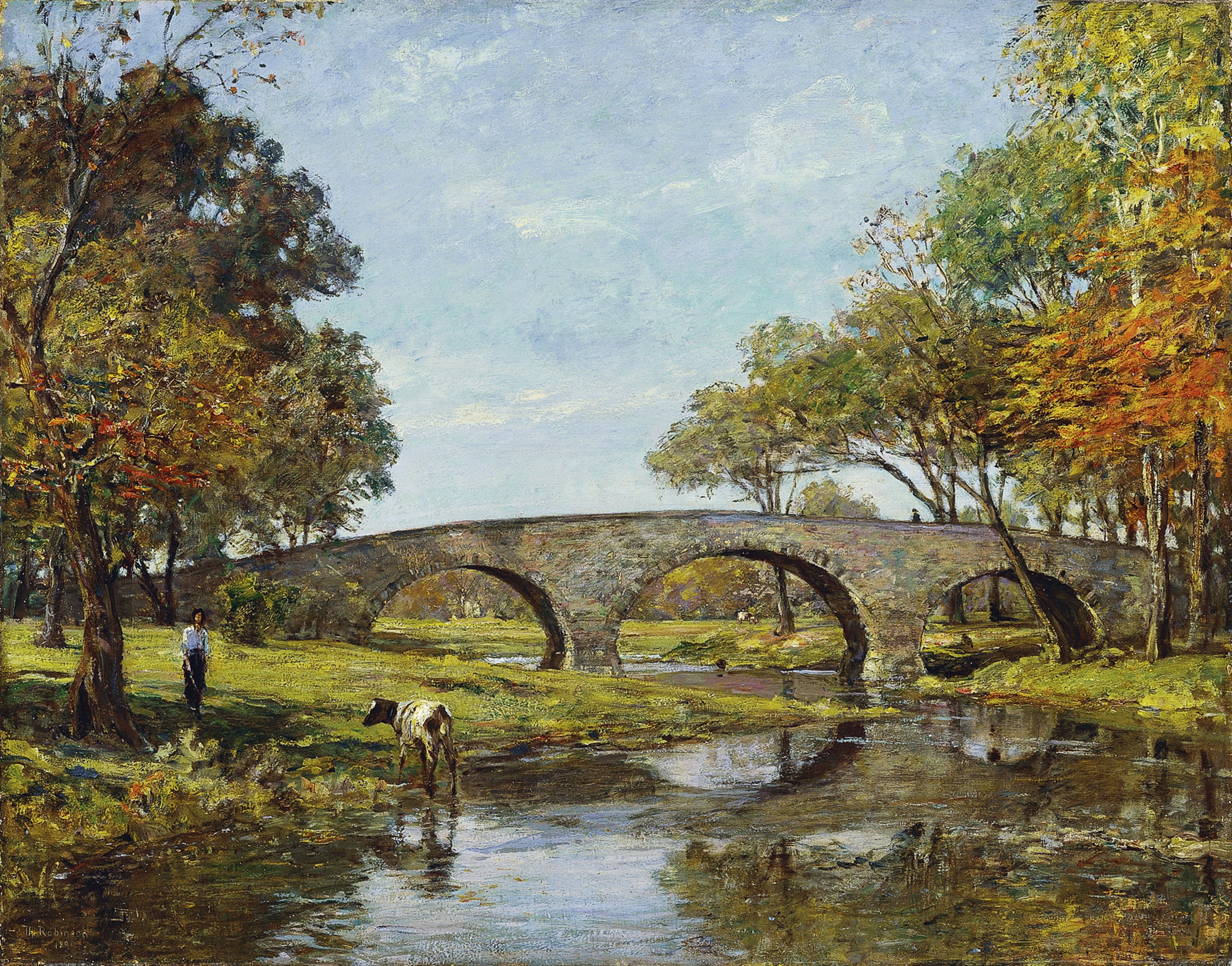
The Old Bridge, 1890. Museo Thyssen-Bornemisza.

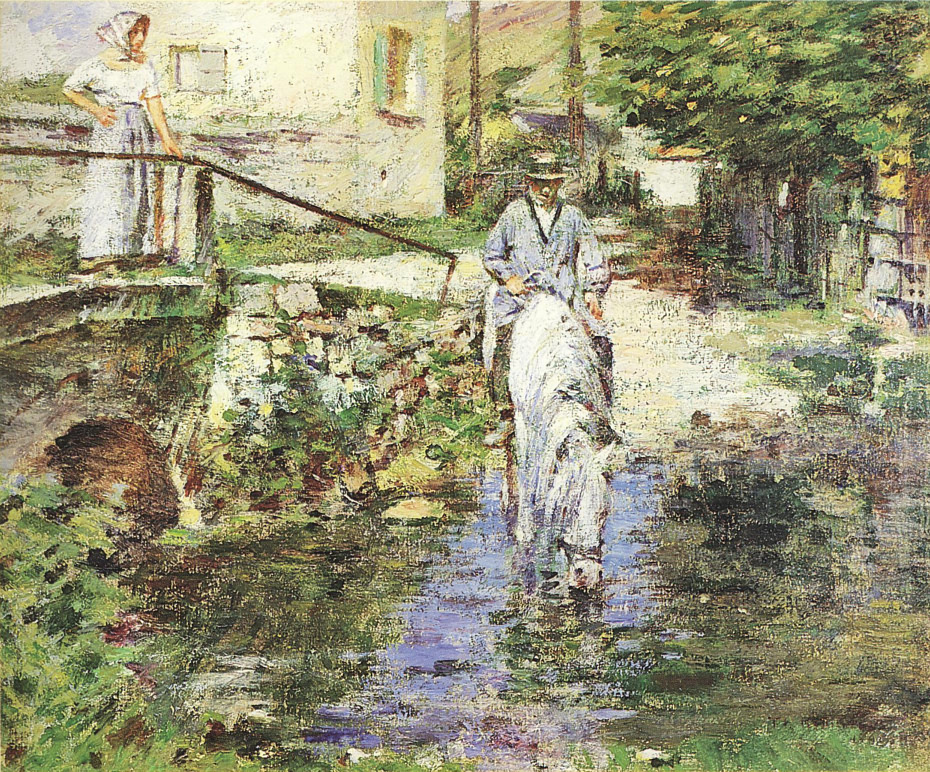
Père Trognon and His Daughter at the Bridge, (1891)

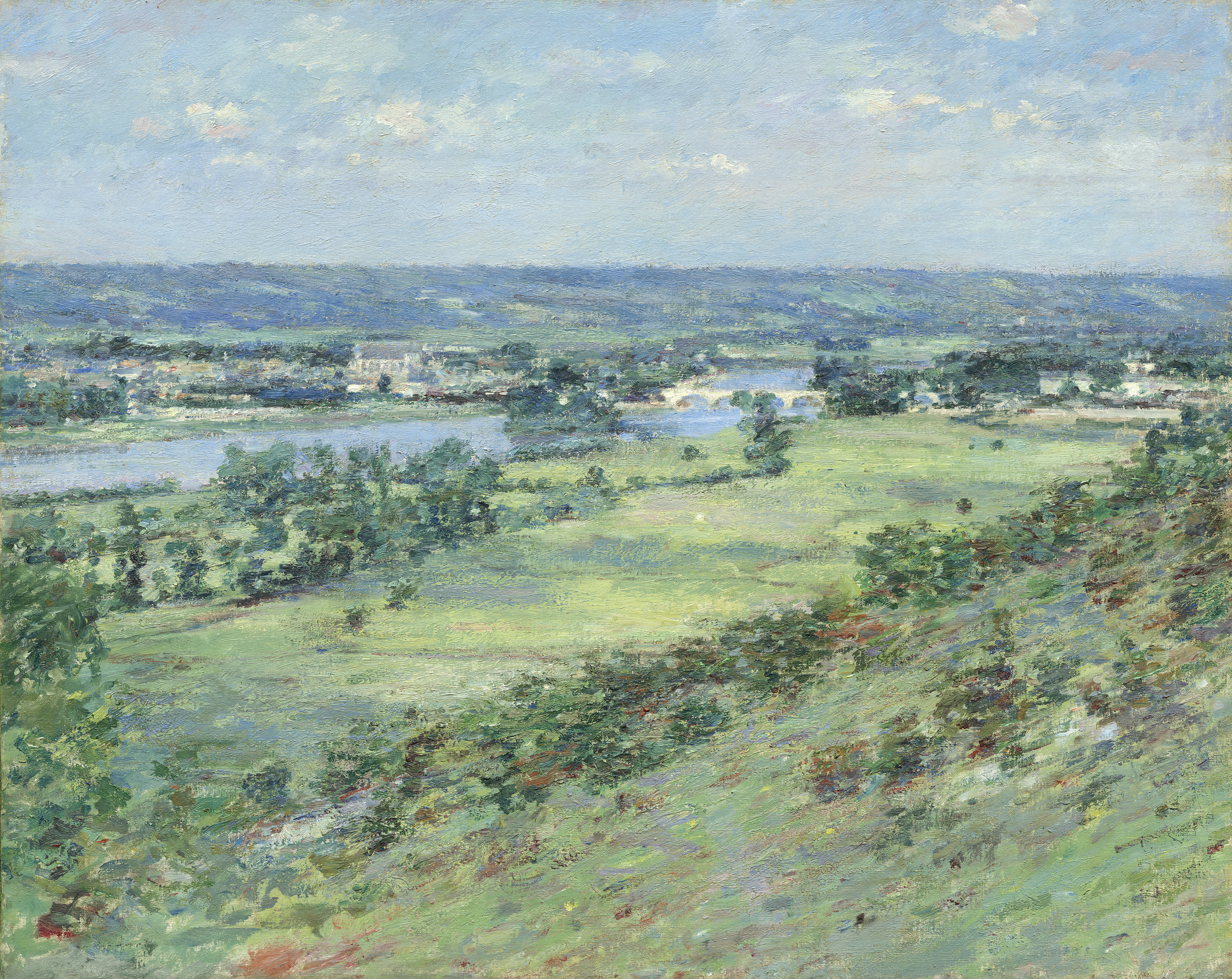
Valley of the Seine from Giverny Heights, (1892), Corcoran Gallery of Art

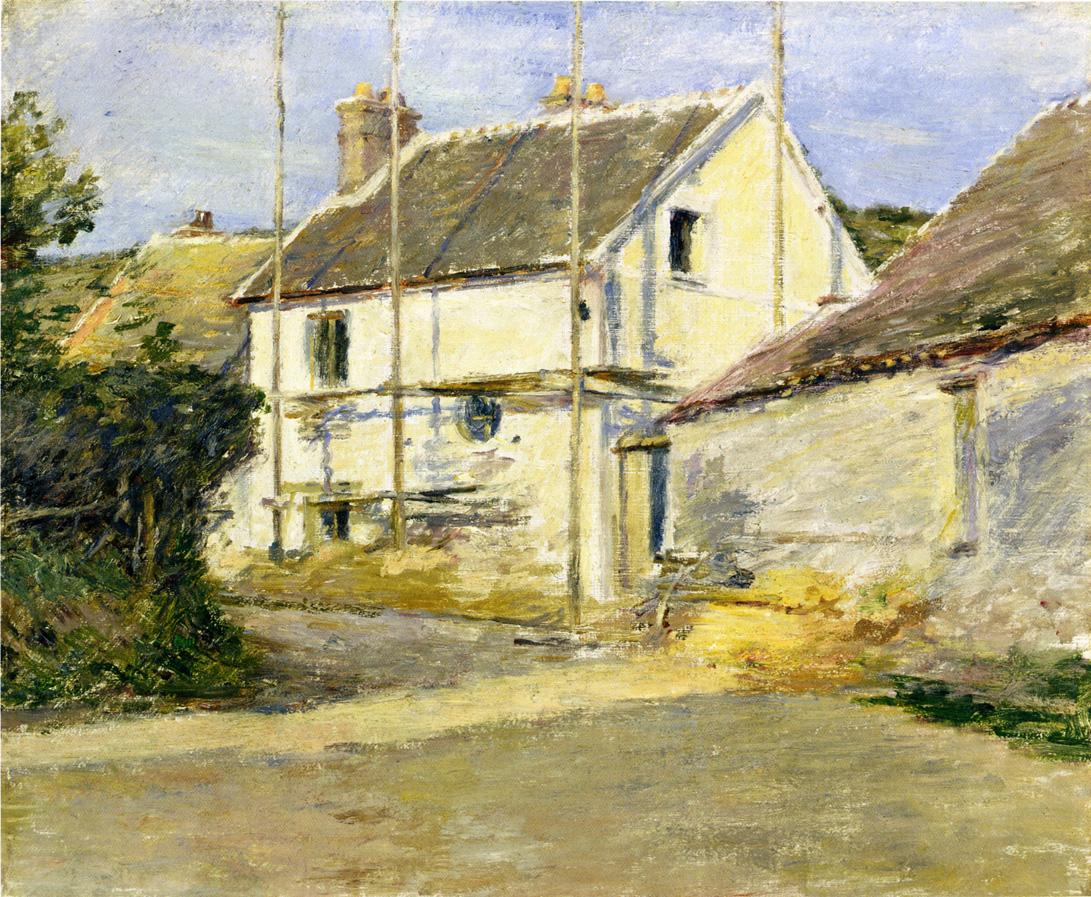
House with Scaffolding, (1892), North Carolina Museum of Art

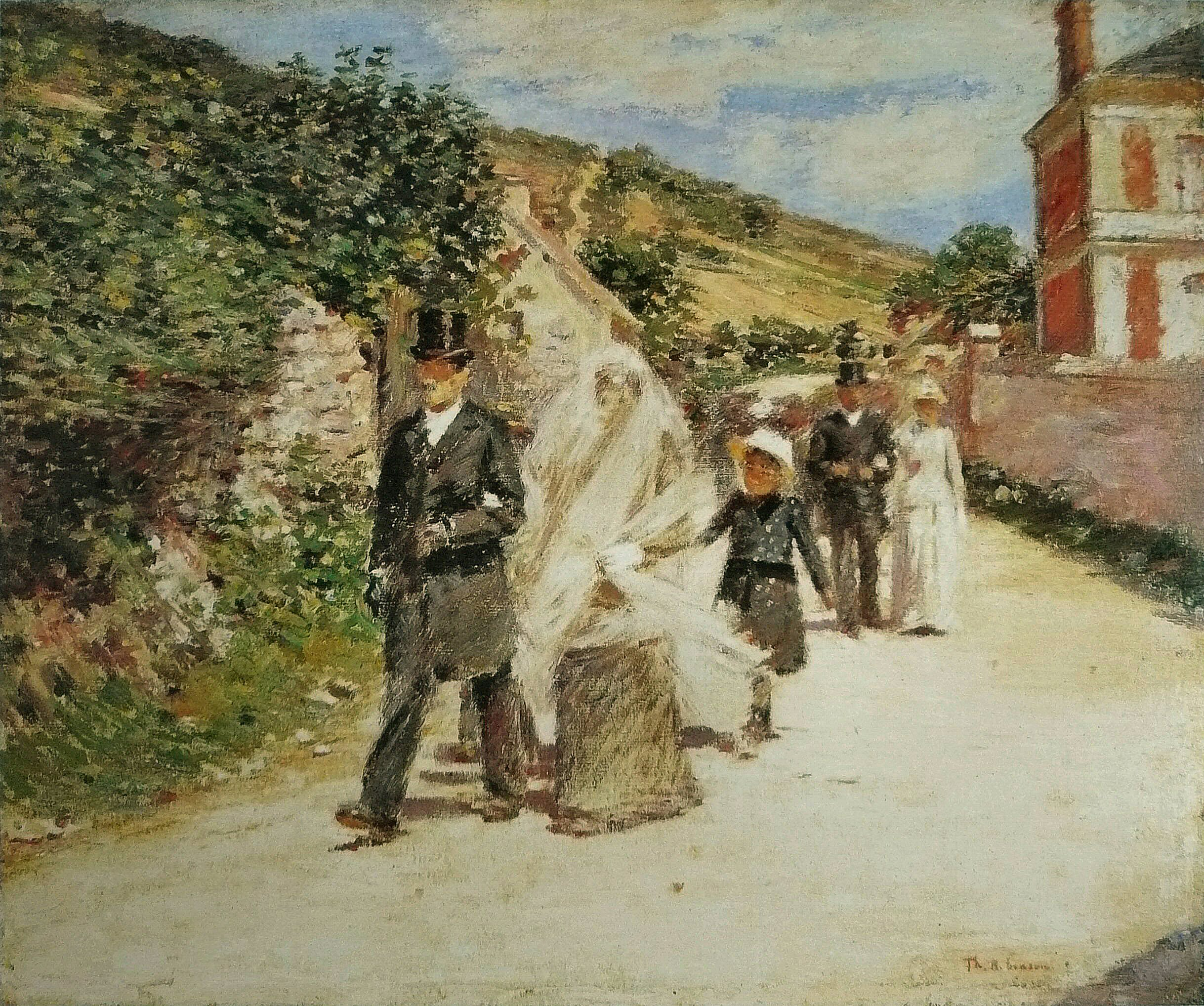
The Wedding March, (1892)

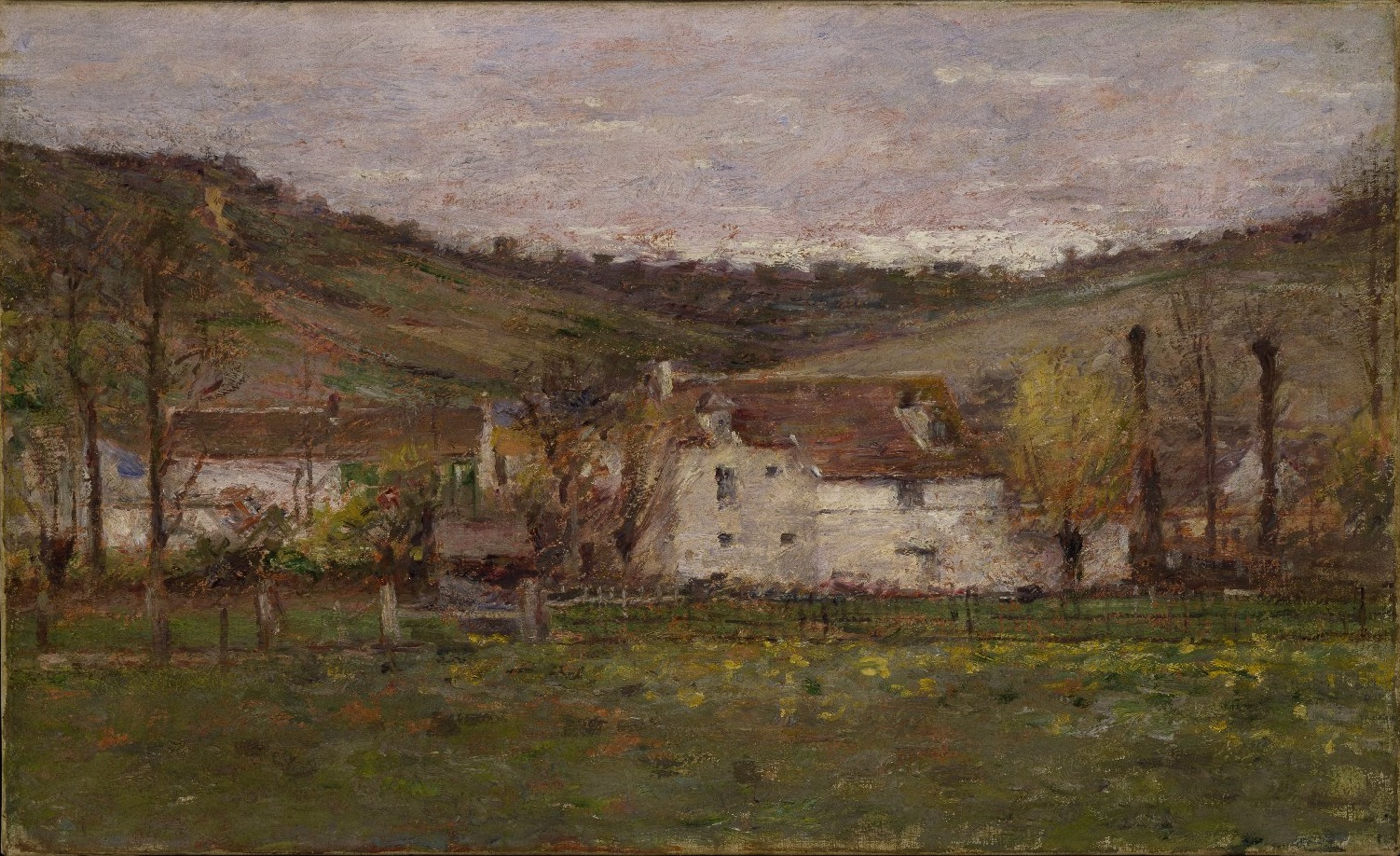
A French Hamlet , (1892) Brooklyn Museum

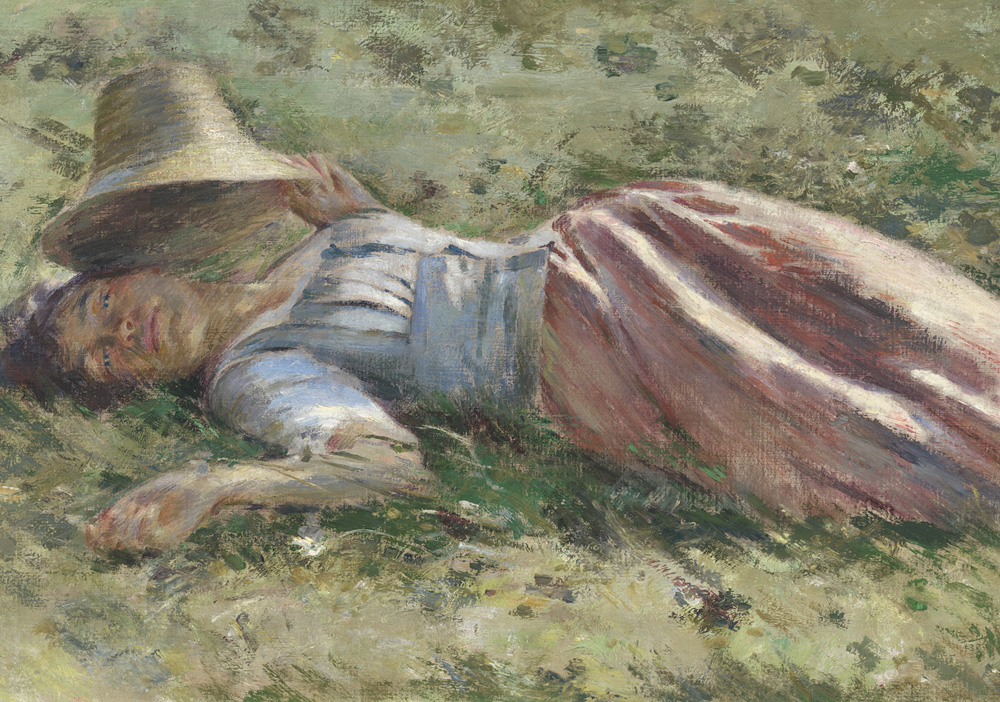
In the Sun (1892), a study of his romantic companion Marie

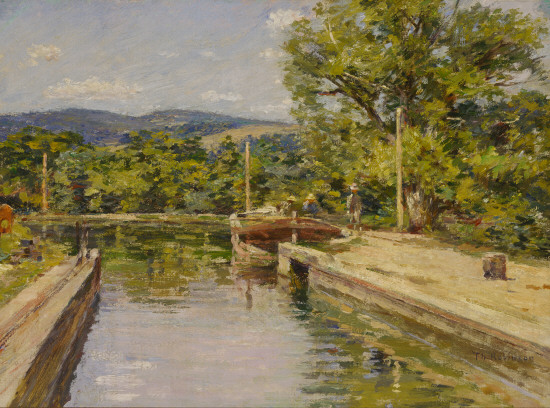
Canal Scene, (1893)

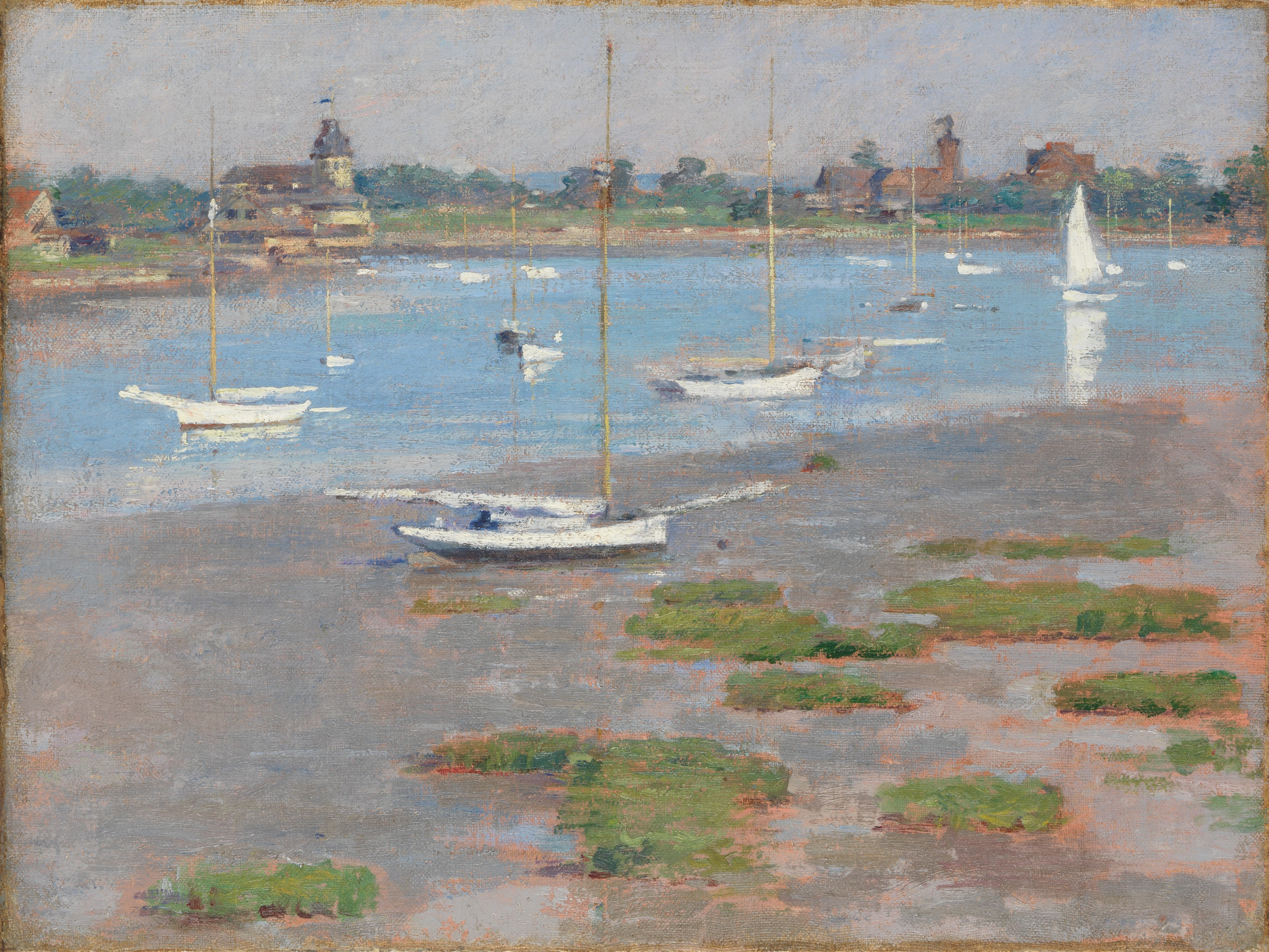
Low Tide Riverside Yacht Club, (1894), Collection of Margaret and Raymond Horowitz

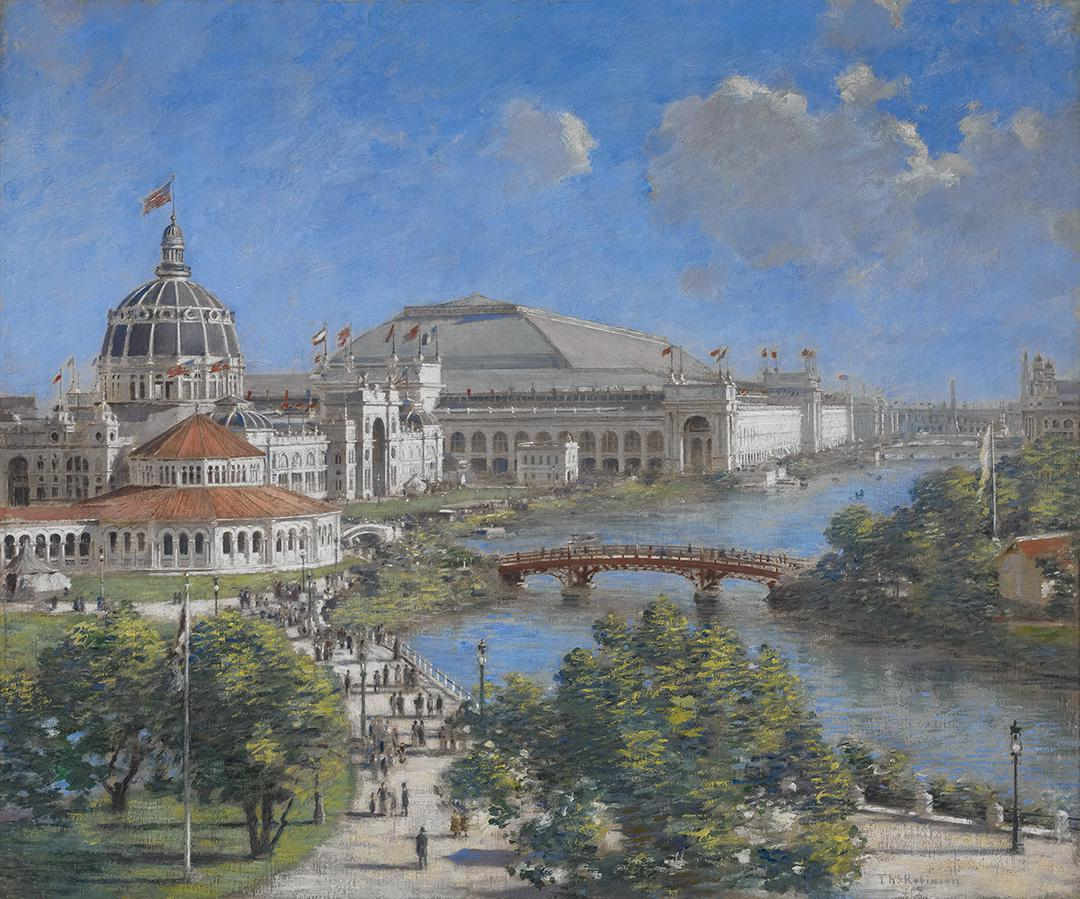
World's Columbian Exposition (1894), Collection of Crystal Bridges Museum of American Art.

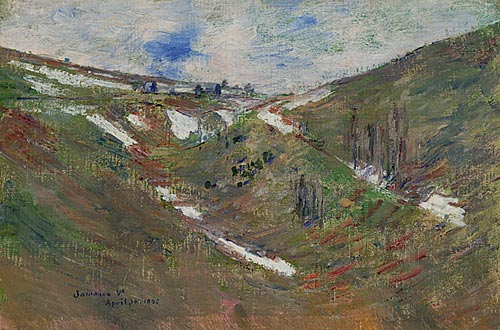
Theodore Robinson, Jamaica, Vermont, (1895)
