= Cohasset Yacht Club =

Boating association

Coordinates: 42°14′34″N 70°47′21″W

Cohassett Yacht Club
- Short name: CYC
- Founded: 1894
- Location: 99 Howard Gleason Road, Cohasset, Massachusetts, 02025
- Commodore Eric C. Crews
- Website: www.cohassetyc.org

Cohasset Yacht Club is one of the oldest yacht clubs in America having been first organized in 1887 and more formally founded in 1894. It is a private sailing association located in Cohasset, Massachusetts. Women members of the club have won the prestigious women's sailing competition for the Mrs. Charles Francis Adams Trophy nine times.

== Early history ==
The harbor of Cohasset attracted many sailing enthusiasts in the late 1800s. An initial attempt to form a yachting club was widely reported to have been launched by actor Lawrence Barrett and the famous comedian and actor William H. Crane in 1887. A commodore and executive committee were also said to have been selected and by-laws adopted. The slate was presided over by Commodore William E. Crocker. Members of the executive committee included Harry E. Mapes, Frank R. Pegram, Edgar Buffum, George Jason, Henry Brennock, and Thomas S. Grassie. Barrett and Crane were made honorary members as was the actor Stuart Robson, Dr. John Bryant, America's Cup winner Captain Aubrey Crocker and Matthew Luce. Open regattas took place in 1887 and 1888.

Despite this early announcement, there was little activity reported for the club after 1888. The club reorganized several years later in 1894. Many of the same participants in the first iteration were active in the second. The club was founded largely by summer residents of the shore town of Cohasset with an early membership of 50 individuals. Only two-thirds were yacht owners and the type of boats they owned were catboats and steam yachts.

In 1894, George R. Howe was Commodore, joined by Harry E. Mapes, Vice Commodore, Charles W. Cousens, Treasurer, and H. W. Souther, Secretary. This time William Crane was a member of the club's Executive Committee as were Morton S. Crehore, John C. Howe, L. D. Wilcutt and A. A. Lawrence.

== Famous members ==
- Charles Francis Adams, 1920 America's Cup victor and skipper of Resolute (yacht).
- Franny Wakeman, 4-time winner of the Adams Cup.
- F. Gregg Bemis, the only American to be awarded both the Herreshoff Trophy and the Beppe Croce Trophy in 1989.

== Clubhouse ==
The organization's original clubhouse was built on land donated by a member, Dr. John Bryant, in 1894. It was conveniently located on what is known today as Howard Gleason Road. At that time, the area was nicknamed "Actors Row," and it was where some of the club's founding members lived including Crane.

A new clubhouse was built in 2016 after Hurricane Sandy to take the place of the original building which had lasted over 124 years. The structure was dedicated in 2018.
