= Morris Rosenfeld (photographer) =

American maritime photographer (1885–1968)

- Born: February 16, 1885; Budapest, Austria-Hungary
- Died: September 21, 1968 (aged 83)
- Education: Cooper Union
- Known for: Maritime photography
- Spouse: Esther Marion Hirsch
- Children: 5

Morris "Rosie" Rosenfeld (February 16, 1885 – September 21, 1968) was a Hungarian-American photographer most famous for his maritime work, especially his photos of yachting.

== Biography ==
=== Early life ===
Rosenfeld was born in Budapest, then part of Austria-Hungary, on February 16, 1885 to Adolph Rosenfeld and Lena Kendal Rosenfeld. The Rosenfeld family moved to the United States in 1887 and became citizens in Brooklyn on July 28, 1904.

His parents wanted him to become a doctor, but Rosenfeld was determined to be an artist. He took his first maritime photograph in 1898, for which he won a $5 prize. He studied art at Cooper Union as a teen.

=== Career ===
Rosenfeld became an apprentice under Edwin Levick, another noted maritime photographer. His career is best known for capturing the America's Cup over the years, especially for capturing growing relevance of women within yachting.

=== Death ===
Morris Rosenfeld died on September 21, 1968. His son Stanley took over his business.

== Legacy ==
Rosenfeld's photographs are held at the New York Public Library's Photography Collection and at the Rosenfeld Collection at Mystic Seaport since 1984.

Rosenfeld was posthumously inducted into the National Sailing Hall of Fame on October 27, 2013 and Herreshoff Marine Museum's America's Cup Hall of Fame in 1995. The Rosenfeld family as a whole was inducted into National Marine Manufacturers Association's Hall of Fame in 1991.

== Bibliography ==
- The Story of American Yachting (1958)
