= American Yacht Club (New York) =

Boating association

- Burgee
- Short name: AYC
- Founded: 1883
- Location: 499 Stuyvesant Avenue, Rye, New York 10580
- Commodore Libby Alexander
- Website: www.americanyc.org

The American Yacht Club is a yacht club located in Rye, New York distinguished by a long history of competitive racing and leadership in growing the sport among women and junior sailors.

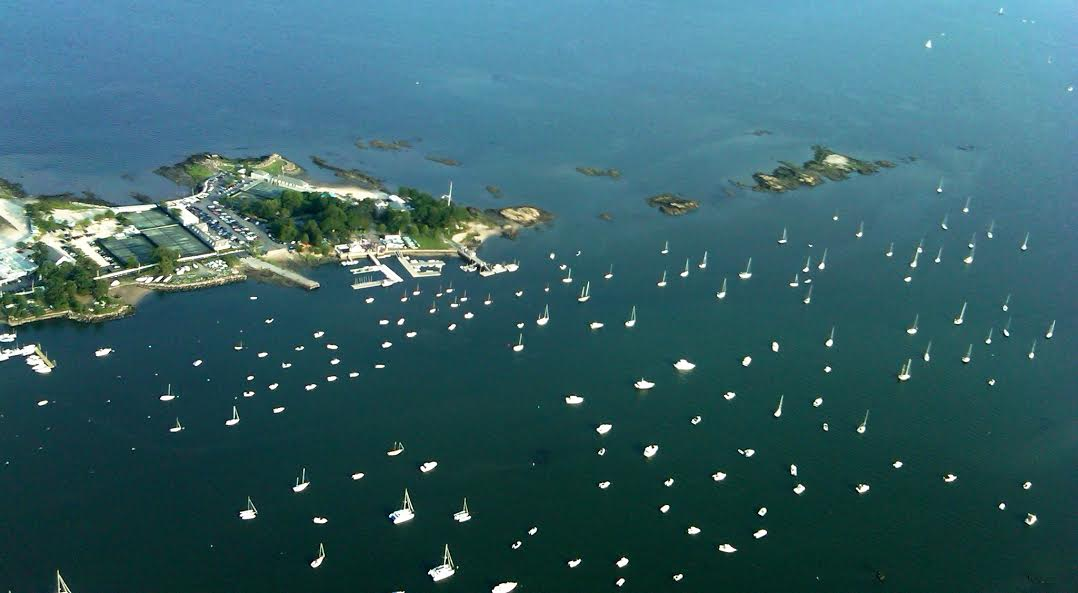
American Yacht Club aerial 2015

== History ==
The American Yacht Club, also known as AYC, was founded on May 1, 1883. Its original 15 incorporators were: William P. Clyde, president of the Clyde Steamship Company; Washington E. Connor; Alfred de Cordova; William B. Dowd; Jay Gould and his son George Jay Gould; Jesse R. Grant; Cornelius Hatch; James B. Houston; Frank K. Lawrence; Christopher Meyer; Thomas C. Platt; Henry O. Taylor; Cornelius F. Timpson; and George S. Scott. Many of these men worked in the shipbuilding and engineering fields.

Unlike the New York Yacht Club, American Yacht Club had the particular object of promoting the development of steam yachts. One of the principal founders Jay Gould, had his 228-foot steam yacht, Atalanta, built that same year.

On August 7, 1884, AYC held its first regatta which was also the first race of steam yachts ever held in America.

== Clubhouses ==
Club members initially gathered in rooms in Manhattan on Madison Avenue and Fifth Avenue. They briefly considered making a home on Charles Island in Milford going as far as to place a down payment on the property in the spring of 1884 before pivoting to the purchase of land in Rye from the Wainwright family. A large Queen Anne-style clubhouse was finally constructed on the tip of Milton Point on Long Island Sound in 1894. The architect of this building was Edward A. Sargent.

On July 27, 1951, a fire devastated the club house and a new structure was erected for $375,000 under the leadership of Commodore William L. Crow. The architect of the colonial styled building was Jonathan Butler of Rye.

== In the 20th century ==
The club always included sailboats and today many different designs can be found moored in the club's harbor or competing with other boats from around the country or the world in high performance regattas. Boats in the AYC fleet include everything from antique, classic boats to foil models like Moths and Waszps. The composition of AYC's membership and its governing board has also changed with many women sailing both on their own and through a program called Women on the Water (WOW). In 2021, AYC voted in its first woman flag officer as Rear Commodore.

== Women's sailing ==
AYC has attracted many accomplished women competitors and sailing mentors including Adams Cup Champions Lorna Whittelsey Hibberd (sailing out of Indian Harbor Yacht Club, 1927, 1928, 1930, 1931, 1934); Frances Wakeman (1935, 1936, 1937, 1938); Sylvia Shethar (1939, 1940, 1947); and Allegra "Leggie" Mertz (1947, 1950, 1954, 1959, 1963). Mertz was president of the Women's National Yacht Racing Association and in 1956, she envisioned a day when there would be an Olympic women's sailing team. She was also president of the International Blue Jay Class Association.

Courtenay Becker-Dey brought home a bronze medal for sailing in the 1996 Summer Olympics. More recently, AYC women won the 2016 International Keelboat Championship in a one design J/70 with Clemmie Everett at the helm of a crew that included Alix Hahn, Carolyn Russell and Erin Sprague.

== Junior sailing ==
AYC has long had an active junior sailing program. In 1925, shortly after the founding of the Junior Sailing Association of Long Island (JSA) in 1924, the club developed a new class of boats specifically for junior sailors. This initiative under the leadership of then Commodore Philip Mallory, introduced a new type of boat called the Wee Scotts. AYC's role in promoting sailing has continued with its active participation in the JSA. The club's Young American Junior Big Boat Sailing Team, established in 2013, have placed first in the 2016 Bermuda Race (Class 10) while other AYC junior sailor honors include winning the Stephens Brothers Youth Division Trophy and Storm Trysail Boomerang Trophy. In 2018, American Yacht Club became the home base for the new non-profit Young American Sailing Academy, Inc. (YASA).

== Regattas and trophies ==
The club awards several perpetual trophies for racing including the Joyette Trophy for PHRF Division Racing; Zilph Trophy for One-Design; the Cynosure Trophy for the ORC Division; and the Roger Sherman Memorial Trophy

In concert with Larchmont Yacht Club, AYC has hosted the Robie Pierce Regatta, a regatta for sailors with disabilities, since 2009.

== Environmental advocacy ==
When a proposal to build a bridge from Oyster Bay to Rye was proposed and threatened the ecology of Long Island Sound, American Yacht Club led by Hugh Cuthbert partnered with Sheldrake Yacht Club to lead a "boatercade" in protest.

== Notable members ==
- Joseph Pulitzer, newspaper publisher, owner of steam yacht Romola
- Henry Flagler, American industrialist
- Frederick William Vanderbilt,
- Frances "Frannie" Wakeman, four-time winning skipper of the Adams Cup (1935-1938)
- Lorna Hibberd, five-time winner of the Adams Cup
- Allegra Mertz, National Women's Sailing Champion and Adams Cup winner
- Courtenay Becker-Dey, 1996 Olympic Bronze medalist
