= Timothea Larr =

Naval architect

Timothea Schneider Larr
Personal information
- Full name: Timothea Schneider Larr
- Nickname: Timmy
- Born: Timothea Schneider; 1 June 1940 (age 86)

Sailing career
- Sport: Sailing
- College team: University of Michigan

Timothea "Timmy" Larr is a naval architect and three-time winner of United States Women's Sailing Championship. She was inducted into the National Sailing Hall of Fame in 2013. She is also known for her work in developing training programs for sailors in the United States.

== Education and career ==
Larr is an alumna of Friends Academy and the University of Michigan where she earned a degree in naval architecture in 1964. Following college, she worked at MacLear and Harris, a yacht design firm. She described some of the boats she helped design, including a 72-foot double centerboard ketch and a 72 foot catamaran, in a 1966 article in the New York Times that profiled Larr.

== Sailing history ==
Larr started sailing when she was around ten years old, and as a junior won championships in a Seabird. In college, she sailed on the varsity team at the University of Michigan for all four years. Larr has raced multiple types of boats. As a member of Seawanhaka Corinthian Yacht Club, she sailed her sister's boat to win the Raven national championships in 1961 and 1965. She also won Manhasset Bay Yacht Club's Race Week in the Ravens in 1965. Larr won the Syce Cup, the Long Island Sound women's sailing championship in 1961, 1965, and 1973.

In 1962, she switched to sailing in the International One Design class and, in an article in the New York Times, she described how she was the only woman skipper in the fleet where she enjoyed the longer season and tougher competition in the class. At the conclusion of the 1965 Larchmont Race Week, Larr received the Anne Kathleen Cullen Memorial Trophy for "the helmsman over 18 years old who, in the opinion of the race committee and flag officers, had achieved the best record against the strongest opposition in class with a substantial number of starters". She had raced in the International One Design class that week, and the committee commented on the consistency of her results throughout the week.

In 1969, Larr was the inaugural winner of the Etchells national championship; her husband, David Rea Larr, crewed for her. She went on to win the Etchells national championship again in 1970 and was a two-time winner of the Etchells' North American Championship. In 1972, Larr won an Etchells race at the American Yacht Club where she beat E. W. Etchells, the designer of the boat.

Larr won the US Sailing Women's Championship, the Mrs. Charles Francis Adams Trophy, three times (1961, 1965, and 1973). Sheila McCurdy, the first female Commodore of the Cruising Club of America, describes the summer she spent sailing with Larr in Solings while training to go to the Adams Cup which they won together in 1973.

=== Contributions to training ===
Larr has made multiple contributions to training new sailors and standardizing the sail training program in the United States. US Sailing annually presents the TImothea Larr Award for "outstanding contribution to the sport". Larr has written articles and books that train sailors and power boaters, worked on the National On-Water Standards for boating safety, and served as chair of the Junior Yacht Racing Association of Long Island Sound (1976-1979). In 1983, Larr participated in the discussion about winged keels on the America's Cup boats in the 12-Meter Class, thereby bringing her training in naval architecture into the realm of competitive sailing. In 2016, Larr and Bill Simon collaborated to establish the Clagett/Oakcliff Match Race, a match racing competition for adaptive sailors. Larr was a college council member of State University of New York Maritime College and a member of committees within the United States Yacht Racing Union.

== Awards ==
In 1992, US Sailing awarded Larr the Nathanael G. Herreshoff Trophy for "outstanding contribution to the sport of sailing in this country in any associated activity", and in 2013 she became the second woman inducted into the National Sailing Hall of Fame. In 1993, Larr became the first recipient of the Luray Award which is Community Sailing's highest honor and recognizes someone who has furthered public access to sailing. Larr was named US Sailor of the Year first in 1961, the first year the honor was named, and again in 1965.
