= Riverside Yacht Club =

Yacht club in Greenwich, Connecticut

- Burgee
- Short name: RYC
- Founded: 1888
- Location: 102 Club Road, Riverside, CT 06878 United States
- Website: www.riversideyc.org

The Riverside Yacht Club, Connecticut is a private, recreational yacht club located in the Riverside neighborhood of Greenwich, Connecticut, with access to Long Island Sound. The majority of its members are residents of the surrounding Greenwich neighborhoods of Riverside, Old Greenwich, and Cos Cob. It is the second oldest yacht club in Connecticut and one of the oldest in the United States.

== History ==
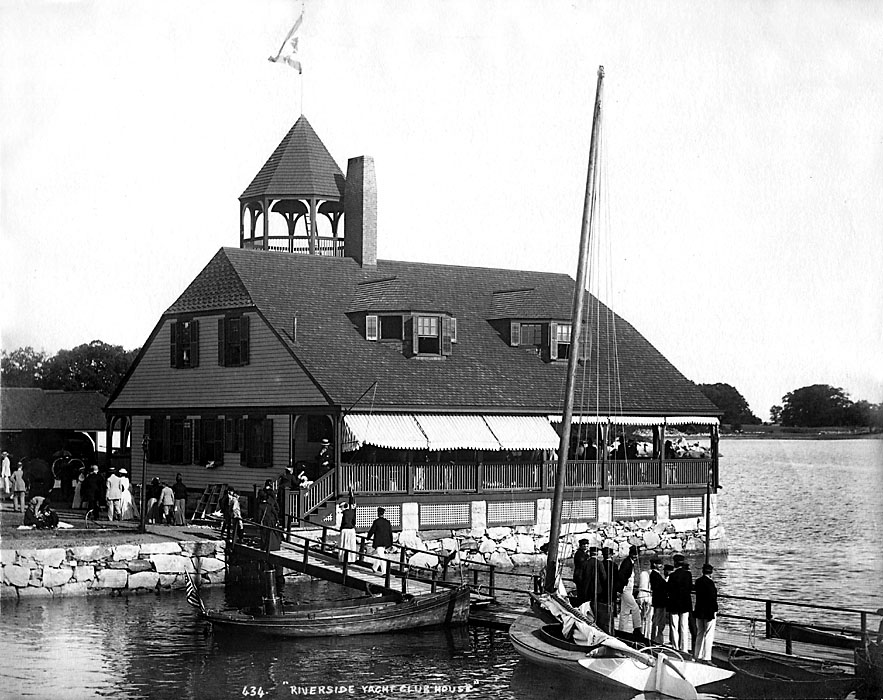
Clubhouse of the Riverside Yacht Club, as it appeared in the 1890s. Photo by John S. Johnston.

The Riverside Yacht Club was founded in 1888 by George I. Tyson, a prominent and wealthy summer resident of Riverside, CT, and the owner of the yacht Nirvana. Using his own money and waterfront property, Tyson built the original Victorian-style clubhouse in 1889 on the eastern shore of Cos Cob Harbor near the entrance of the Mianus River. Tyson became the first Commodore, a post he held for eight years.

The original clubhouse contained a kitchen, ballroom, reading rooms, card rooms, bedrooms, locker rooms, and an expansive wrap-around porch. In 1893, a new addition was constructed, containing a billiard room, shuffleboard area, bowling area, staff housing, and horse sheds.

For a short period during the early 1890s, the club met in winter quarters in New York City, and by the late 1920s, the club membership had purchased the property from the Tyson estate. In 1929, construction of the current clubhouse was completed.

On September 21, 1938, the 1938 New England hurricane caused the main and junior clubhouses to flood, with no damage to sailing vessels. Some vessels, but not the clubhouse, were damaged as a result of the 1944 Great Atlantic hurricane.

In 1978 and 2013, the clubhouse underwent major renovations.

== Cultural references ==
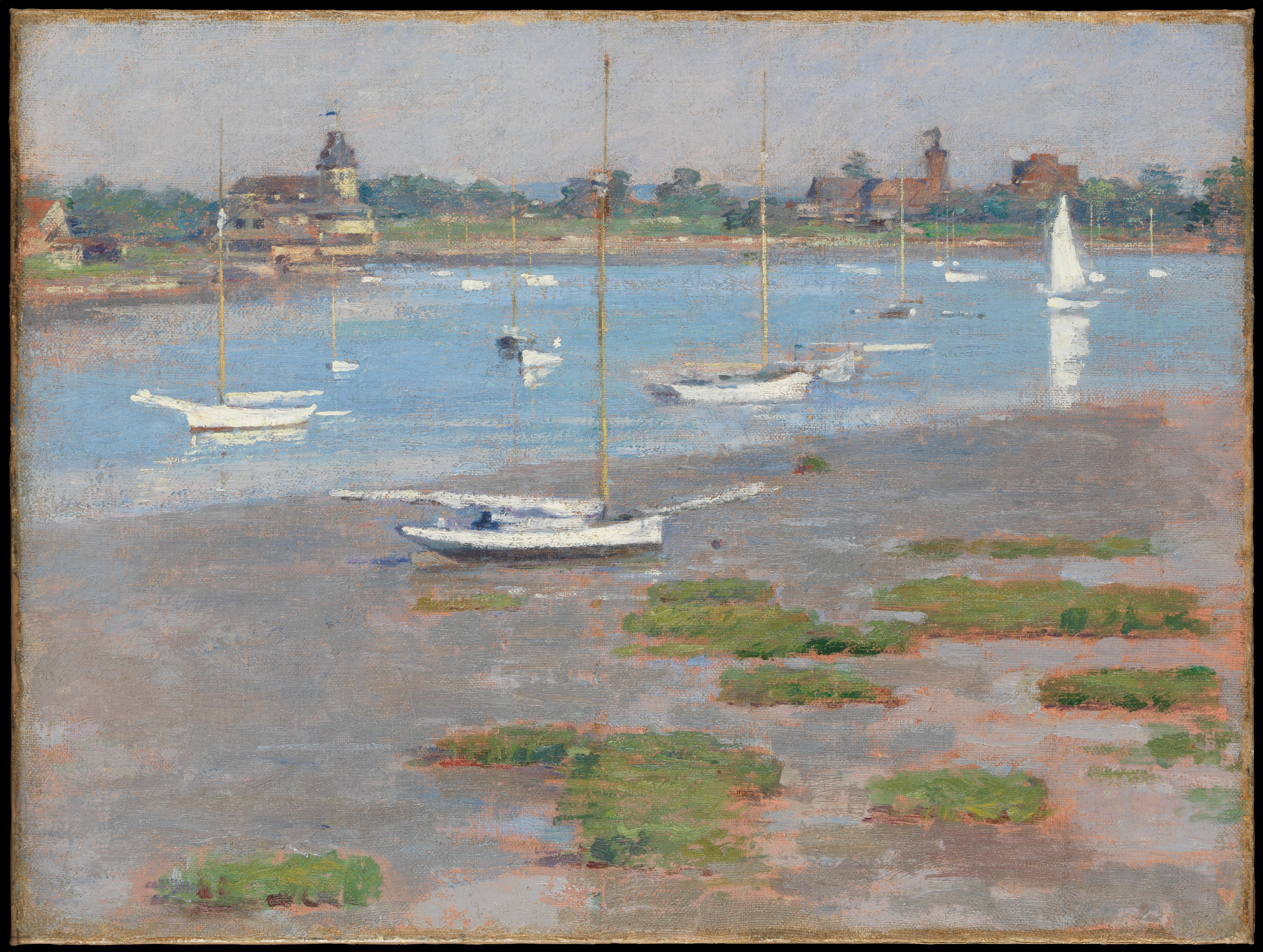
Low Tide, Riverside Yacht Club (1894), by Impressionist painter Theodore Robinson.

The Riverside Yacht Club was the subject of Low Tide, Riverside Yacht Club (1894) by American Impressionist painter Theodore Robinson.
