= Jan O'Malley =

American sailor (born 1946)

Personal information
- Born: 1946 (age 78–79)

Sport

Sailing career
- Club: Mantoloking Yacht Club

Jan Chance O'Malley (born 1946) is an American sailor who was named US Sailor of the Year three times: in 1969, 1970, and 1977.

== Sailing history ==
O'Malley started sailing in wood boats in Barnegat Bay. She won the Mrs. Charles Francis Adams Trophy, the United States' women's national championship, in 1969 and 1970. Both years she sailed with her sister-in-law Patricia O'Malley, with whom she also won the United States' doublehanded championship. In 1977 she won the first women's world sailing championship that was held in England in 1977.

O'Malley talked about the challenges of raising kids and competitive sailing in a 1978 article in The New York Times. She was the United States representative to the International Yacht Racing Union meeting when the decision was made to add women-only competitions to the Olympics, O'Malley did not approve of this change as she felt that women would catch up to the men in select sailboats where men were not at a physical advantage due to their physical size. By 2002, O'Malley noted that the presence of all-women events was a positive development for women in competitive sailing.

== Awards and honors ==
O'Malley was named US Sailor of the Year Awards three times, first in 1969 and then two additional awards in 1970 and 1977. In 1988, she received the United States Yacht Racing Union's One Design Achievement Award. In 2014 she was inducted into the Barnegat Bay Sailing Hall of Fame.

== Personal life ==
O'Malley comes from a family of sailors, including her father, Britton Chance, her brother Britton Chance Jr., and her niece, Hannah Swett, who was named US Sailor of the Year in 2004.

She has been a resident of Mantoloking, New Jersey.
