= Edgartown Yacht Club =

Yacht club in Edgartown, Massachusetts

- Burgee
- Short name: EYC
- Founded: January 5, 1905; 120 years ago
- Location: 1 Dock Street, Edgartown, Massachusetts 02539 United States
- Website: www.edgartownyc.org

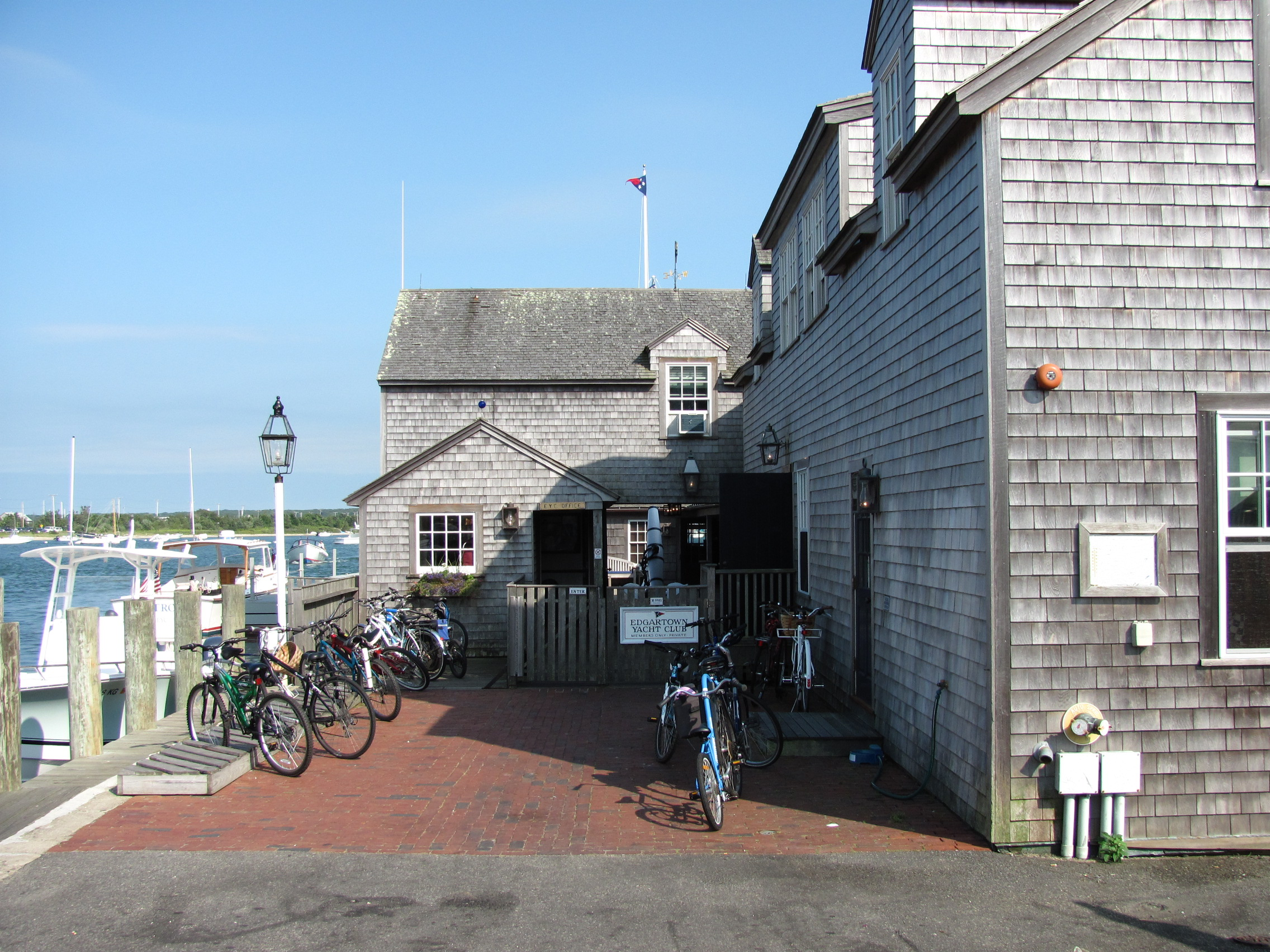
Clubhouse

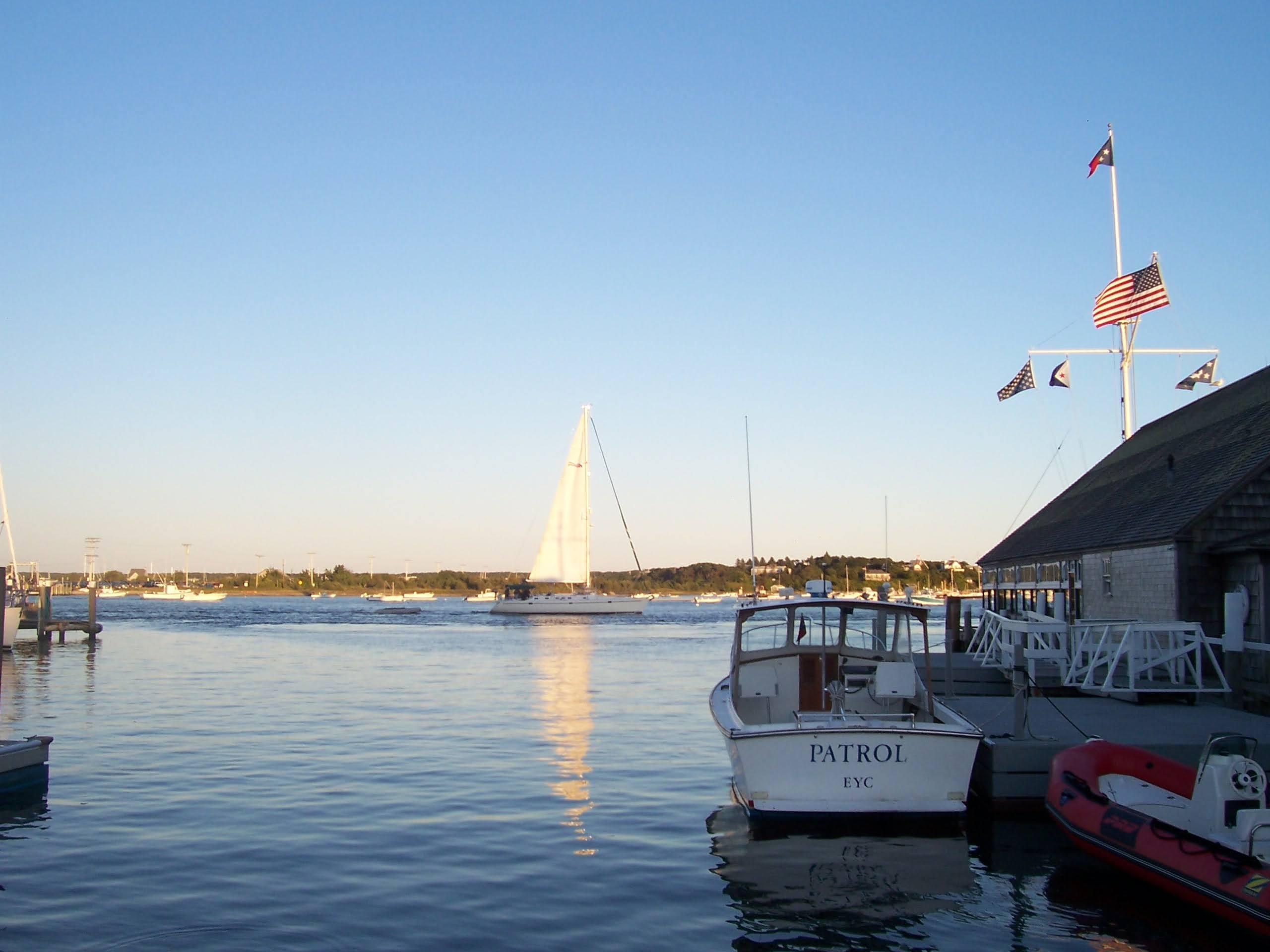
Patrol boat

The Edgartown Yacht Club is a private yacht club in Edgartown, Massachusetts on the island of Martha's Vineyard. The club was founded on January 5, 1905, and Edward H. Raymond was named its first commodore. The Edgartown Yacht Club's current clubhouse was completed in 1927, and is on Dock Street in downtown Edgartown. As of October 1, 2020, the commodore is Howard F. Powers, Jr.

The club also includes a "Junior Yacht Club" created in 1923. In the words of the Edgartown Yacht Club website "The Club sponsored the formation of the Edgartown Junior Yacht Club, one of the first of its kind, to encourage young people to learn sailing, seamanship, racing rules and tactics and other phases of yachting. Since that time, our juniors have had their own clubhouse and elected their own officers and committees, while competing in races and participating in other marine outings. At present, the Club owns a fleet of 30 + Optimist sailing dinghies, 22 420’s and a few Rhodes 19s and Lasers. The summer program is under the direction of an experience staff of 10 or more instructors led by the Sailing Director".

== Tennis ==
The Edgartown Yacht Club also has a very popular tennis program, and operates seven Har-Tru courts and four all weather courts. Teams from the Edgartown Yacht club compete against teams from other clubs, including arch-rival Nantucket Yacht Club.

== Notable members ==
- Walter Cronkite, journalist
- Diana Muldaur, actress
- William Styron, author
- Charles Bass, former Republican congressman from New Hampshire
- Frank Ikard, former Democratic congressman from Texas
- Kris Stookey, Olympian yacht racer
