= Portland Yacht Club =

Yacht club in Falmouth, Maine, USA

Portland Yacht Club is a yacht club in Falmouth, Maine. Established on April 26, 1869, Portland Yacht Club is the "third-oldest yacht club in continuous operation in the United States." It was founded by 121 members and the office of William W. Thomas Jr. served as its first headquarters. It was located on the Portland waterfront until 1946, when it moved to nearby Falmouth. PYC members won the Mrs. Charles Francis Adams Trophy in 1949.

== See also ==
- List of yacht clubs
