= Lake Geneva Yacht Club =

Yacht club in Wisconsin, USA

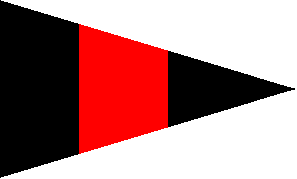
- Burgee
- Short name: LGYC
- Founded: 1874
- Location: Fontana-on-Geneva Lake, Wisconsin, United States
- Website: www.lgyc.com

Lake Geneva Yacht Club, ("LGYC") is a yacht club in Fontana-on-Geneva Lake, Wisconsin, United States.

== History ==
Founded in 1874, it is one of the oldest Inland Lake Yachting Association clubs.

The General Philip H. Sheridan Race Regatta Trophy began in 1874 at Geneva Lake Yacht Club. The club later merged with the West End Yacht Club to form the Lake Geneva Yacht Club Fontana-On-Geneva Lake, Wisconsin. The General Philip H. Sheridan Race Regatta was originally raced in sandbagger sloops and is currently raced in A-Scows.

LGYC was a charter member of the Inland Lake Yachting Association founded in 1897.

The club members of the Inland Lake Yachting Association A-Scow fleet have been competing for the P.A. Valentine Trophy annually since 1911.

== Racing ==
This club is the site of numerous international and National Sailing competitions’, as well as the home Yacht Club of an Olympic Medalist and multiple World Champions in sailboat racing.
