= National Sailing Hall of Fame =

US nonprofit organization

- Type: Hall of fame
- Awarded for: Sailing
- Sponsored by: Sailing Museum
- First award: 2011
- Website: thesailingmuseum.org

The Sailing Museum and National Sailing Hall of Fame is a nonprofit educational organization that promotes sailing and racing by recognizing individuals who have contributed to the sport, highlighting sailing's contribution to the American culture; and demonstrating its value as a hands-on tool for teaching math and science. The organization was established in 2005.

== Sailing Museum ==
The Sailing Museum and National Sailing Hall of Fame was originally housed in the Captain Burtis House, located on the City Dock in Annapolis, Maryland. Visitors to the site could participate in on-the-water experiences and learn about sailing history, art and lore.

On 1 May 2019, it was announced that the National Sailing Hall of Fame would move from Annapolis to Newport, Rhode Island.

In 2019, the National Sailing Hall of Fame purchased the Armory Building on Thames Street in Newport, an historic building which once served as the information headquarters for the America's Cup race. The space was restored to a full exhibit, event and meeting space, in collaboration with the Herreshoff Museum and the America's Cup Hall of Fame.

The new museum opened May 10, 2022, and includes educational programs and special events.

== Governance ==
Gary Jobson and Tom Whidden serve as Co-Chairs of the Board. Ashley Householder is the Executive Director of the Sailing Museum and National Sailing Hall of Fame.

== Inductions ==
The National Sailing Hall of Fame began inducting honorees in 2011. As of January 2024, 123 inductees over 13 classes have been elected to the Hall of Fame.

Nominations to the National Sailing Hall of Fame are made online. A nominating committee evaluates all the submitted nominations. Inductees are typically announced in the summer, and the induction ceremony is held in the fall at different locations around the United States. Inductions began in 2011. The 2020 induction ceremony was held virtually in September 2020, due to the coronavirus pandemic.

=== Class of 2011 ===
Note: Inaugural Year

- Betsy Alison
- Hobie Alter
- Charlie Barr
- Paul Cayard
- Dennis Conner
- Nathanael Herreshoff
- Ted Hood
- Gary Jobson
- Buddy Melges
- Bus Mosbacher, Jr.
- Lowell North
- Joshua Slocum
- Olin Stephens
- Ted Turner
- Harold Vanderbilt

=== Class of 2012 ===
- Peter Barrett
- Bob Bavier, Jr.
- F. Gregg Bemis
- Stan Honey
- Bruce Kirby
- John Kostecki
- Mark Reynolds
- Roderick Stephens Jr.
- John Cox Stevens

=== Class of 2013 ===
- John Alden
- Tom Blackaller, Jr.
- Bill Buchan
- William Starling Burgess
- Frank Butler
- Runnie Colie, Jr.
- Dave Curtis
- Timothea Larr
- Morris Rosenfeld
- Stuart H Walker

=== Class of 2014 ===
- Harry Anderson, Jr.
- Nathaniel Bowditch
- Carl Eichenlaub, Jr.
- Olaf Harken
- Peter Harken
- Lewis Francis Herreshoff
- Jim Kilroy
- George O'Day

=== Class of 2015 ===
- Steve Colgate
- JJ Fetter
- Paul Foerster
- Jan Gougeon
- Meade Gougeon
- Sam Merrick

=== Class of 2016 ===
- Ed Baird
- Malin Burnham
- Bill Ficker
- Harriet Electa "Exy" Johnson
- Irving Johnson
- Bob Johnstone III
- Rod Johnstone
- Tom Perkins
- Dave Ullman

=== Class of 2017 ===
- Bill Bentsen
- Ray Hunt
- Bill Martin
- Clarkie Mills
- Robby Naish
- Corny Shields
- Randy Smyth
- Tom Whidden II

=== Class of 2018 ===
- John Scott Biddle
- Vincent D'avila Melo "Vince" Brun
- George Stravos Coumantaros
- William Ingraham "Bill" Koch
- James Martinus "Ding" Schoonmaker
- William Henry Webb

=== Class of 2019 ===
- Captain John Bonds
- Thomas F. Day
- Robbie Doyle
- Buddy Friedrichs
- Allison Jolly
- Donald McKay
- Everett A. Pearson
- Doug Peterson
- Herbert Lawrence Stone

=== Class of 2020 ===
- James E. Buttersworth
- Gordon Douglass
- Robbie Haines Jr.
- Bill Mattison
- Dave Perry
- John Rousmaniere
- Diane and Hoyle Schweitzer

=== Class of 2021 ===
- Alexander "Red" Bryan and Cortlandt "Bud" Heyniger
- William Carl Buchan
- Augie Diaz
- Gilbert Gray
- Lynne Jewell
- Stephen Luce
- Jane Wiswell Pegel
- Dawn Riley
- Richard "Dick" Rose

=== Class of 2022 ===
- Ed Adams
- Absalom Boston
- Doris Colgate
- Bruce Farr
- Garry Hoyt
- William Shields Lee Jr.
- Jonathan McKee
- Lin and Larry Pardey
- Nick Scandone

=== Class of 2023 ===
- Skip Etchells
- Peter Holmberg
- Sally Honey
- John Kolius
- Bill Lapworth
- John Marshall
- Charley Morgan
- Robert Perry
- Richard Stearns

=== Class of 2024 ===
- Carl Alberg
- Kevin Burnham
- Conn Findlay
- Eric Hall
- Benjamin Staples Hall
- Pete Melvin
- Allegra Mertz
- Gary Mull
- Jan O'Malley
- Dick Tillman
- Butch Ulmer
- Franklin J. Wood

== Lifetime Achievement Award recipients ==
- 2019: Arthur Knapp, Jr.
- 2020: Briggs Cunningham, Jr.
- 2021: Bill Pinkney
- 2022: Roy E. Disney, Terry Kohler, and Frances McElwain Wakeman
- 2023: Tim Hogan

== Affiliations ==
- US Sailing

== Partnerships ==
- U.S. Naval Academy
- Gowrie Group
