= John S. Johnston =

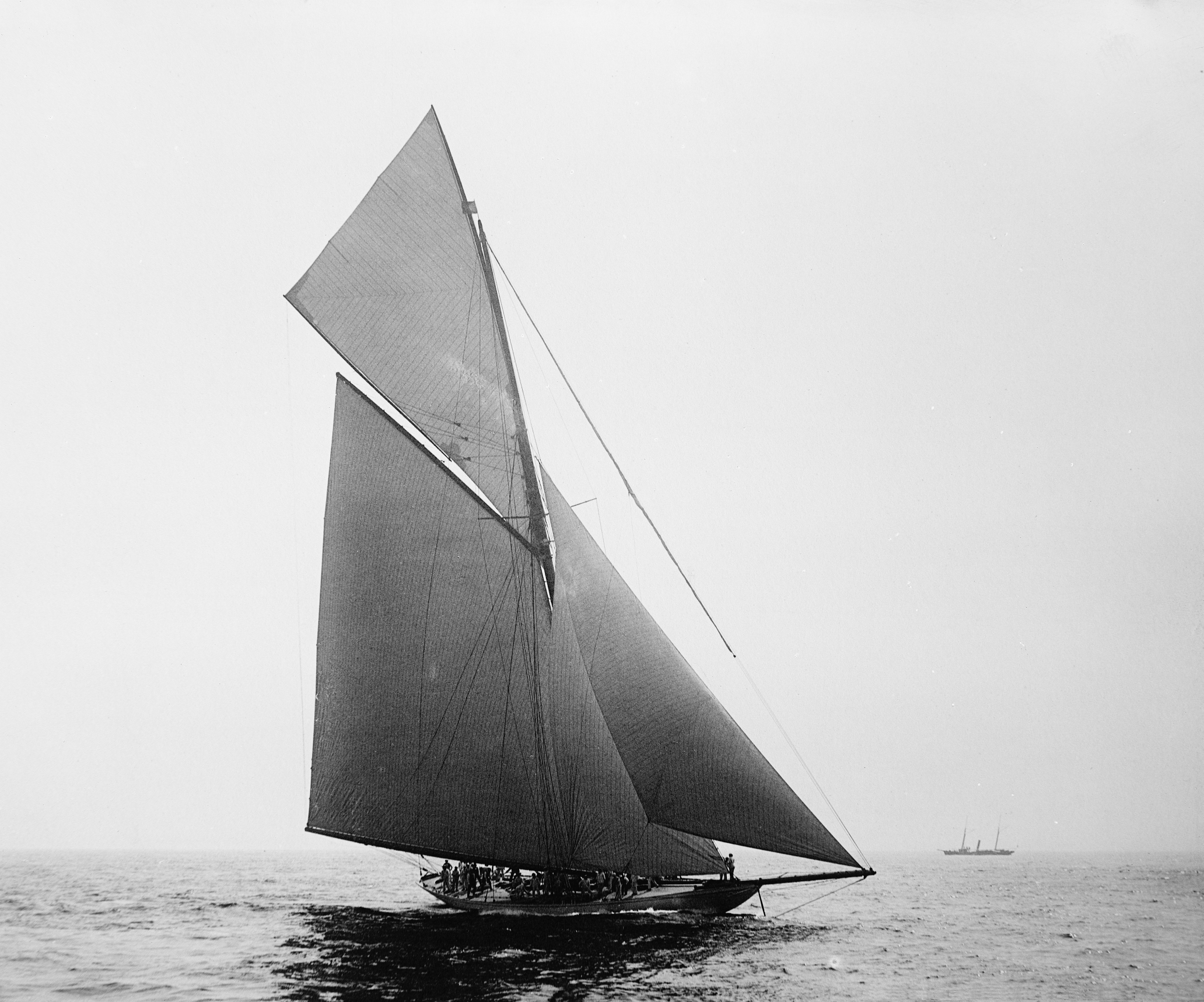
Yacht Valkyrie III as photographed by John S. Johnston in 1895.

John S. Johnston (c.1839 – December 17, 1899) was a late 19th-century maritime and landscape photographer. He is known for his photographs of racing yachts and New York City landmarks and cityscapes.

Very little is known about his life. He was evidently born in Ireland in the late 1830s, and was active in the New York City area in the late 1880s and 1890s. He died in 1899.

Johnston's photographs were published in Outing magazine, Forest and Stream (now Field and Stream), and other 1890s periodicals featuring yacht racing.

Collections of Johnston's work exist today at the Mystic Seaport Museum, the Museum of the City of New York, the National Museum of American History, the Hallmark Photographic Collection, the Metropolitan Museum of Art, the New York Public Library, the Seattle Art Museum, and many other museums and archives across the United States.

He reportedly worked in partnership with C. Miller at one time, and his office was located at various times at 508 W. 158th Street as well as 494 W. 166th St., and 783 Broadway in New York City.
