= Flying Fifteen World Championship =

Series of sailing championships

The Flying Fifteen World Championship is an annual international sailing regatta of Flying Fifteen keelboats, organized by the host club on behalf of the International Flying Fifteen Class Association and recognized by World Sailing, the sports IOC recognized governing body.

== Events ==
Before the class was recognised by World Sailing, International Open meetings were held in 1979 at the Royal Freshwater Bay Yacht Club in Australia and 1980 at Hayling Island Sailing Club in England.

Host cities of the Flying Fifteen World Championship
Host cities of the Flying Fifteen World Championship

Event		Host			Athlete			Boats			Ref.
Ed.	Year	Host club	Location	Country	No.	Nat.	Cont.			Mix.	Ref.
1	1982	Napier Sailing Club	Napier	New Zealand	112	4	3	52	0	4	
2	1984	Kinsale Yacht Club	Kinsale	Ireland	110	5	3	55			
3	1986	Royal Hong Kong Yacht Club	Hong Kong	Hong Kong	122	6	4	61			
4	1988	Royal Norfolk & Suffolk Yacht Club	Lowestoft	United Kingdom	104	7	4	52			
5	1990	Royal Queensland Yacht Squadron	Brisbane	Australia	120	6	4	59			
6	1992	National Yacht Club	Dún Laoghaire	Ireland	124	5	3	54	1	7	
7	1994	Timaru Yacht & Power Boat Club	Timaru	New Zealand	104	5	3	44	0	8	
8	1995	Royal Hong Kong Yacht Club	Hong Kong	Hong Kong	116	7	4	58			
9	1997	Cowes Corinthian Yacht Club	Cowes	United Kingdom	182	7	4	80	0	11	
10	1999	Esperance Bay Yacht Club	Esperance	Australia	144	6	4	62	0	10	
11	2001	Royal Natal Yacht Club	Durban	South Africa	102	6	3	48	0	3	
12	2003	National Yacht Club	Dún Laoghaire	Ireland	154	7	3	63	0	14	
13	2005	Royal Akarana Yacht Club	Auckland	New Zealand	140	7	4	62	0	8	
14	2007	Reial Club Nàutic Port de Pollença	Mallorca	Spain	144	8	4	62	0	10	
15	2009	Royal Yacht Club of Victoria	Melbourne	Australia	160	6	3	68	0	12	
16	2011	Hayling Island Sailing Club	Hayling Island	United Kingdom	120	8	5	55	0	5	
17	2013	Royal Hong Kong Yacht Club	Hong Kong	Hong Kong	104	7	3	43	0	9	
18	2015	Centre Nautique de Crozon-Morgat	Crozon-Morgat	France	138	8	3	54	0	15	
19	2017	Napier Sailing Club	Napier	New Zealand	114	5	4	44	1	12	
20	2019	National Yacht Club	Dún Laoghaire	Ireland	144	10	5	62	1	9	
	2021	Royal Freshwater Bay Yacht Club	Perth	Australia	Postponed COVID						
	2022	Royal Freshwater Bay Yacht Club	Perth	Australia	Postponed COVID						
21	2023	Royal Freshwater Bay Yacht Club	Perth	Australia	153	6	4	58	1	17	
22	2025	Weymouth and Portland National Sailing Academy	Portland	United Kingdom	162	9	4	64	1	16	

== Multiple World champions ==
Ranking	Sailor	Gold	Silver	Bronze
1	Chris Turner (GBR)	6	0	0
1	Graham Vials (GBR)	6	0	0
3	Steve Goacher (GBR)	4	2	2
4	Phil Evans (GBR)	3	2	2

== Medalists ==
Year	Gold	Silver	Bronze	Ref.
1979	Free 'N' Easy 2246; John Cassidy (AUS); Don Russell (AUS)	Australia; Graham Lillingston; B. Thornley	Great Britain; J. Royce; M. Nokes	
1980	(Segundo 1 Barry Finlayson (NZL); Ian Norrie (NZL)	Great Britain; Eddie Gilmore; Colin Coffey	Great Britain; Bernie Trenowth Jr; Peter Howard	
1982	Zero G 2386; Peter Gale (AUS); Mark Rimmington (AUS)	New Zealand; Roger Craddock; Stephen Battley	Great Britain; John McCann; William Bassett	
1984	Gripple Nipper 2682; Australia; Graham Lillingston; Mike McKenzie	Great Britain; Graham Bailey; Bill Masterman	Great Britain; Phil Morrison; Martin Gotrel	
1986	Instant Replay 2975; Glen Coulton (AUS); Grant Schultz (AUS)	Great Britain; Phil Morrison; Nigel Appleton	Australia; Peter Gale; Mark Rimmington	
1988	Deejay 3182; Great Britain; Nigel Buckley; Tim Hancock	Great Britain; Greg Wells; Steve Billingham	Australia; Craig Rainey; Simon Walsh	
1990	Willie Wonka 3234; Alan Bax (GBR); Alan Lockhart (GBR)	New Zealand; Roger Craddock; Steve Cunnold	Great Britain; Ian Cleaver; Greg Wells	
1992	Funny Face 3292; Great Britain; Ruper Mander; Gareth Edwards	Australia; Jamie Thompson; Michael Brown	Great Britain; Steve Goacher; Phil Evans	
1994	Whiffler 3371; New Zealand; Roger Craddock; Steve Cunnold	New Zealand; Andrew Ball; Stuart Happ	Great Britain; Rupert Mander; Chris Hewkin	
1995	GBR 3521; Steve Goacher (GBR); Phil Evans (GBR)	Great Britain; Ian Barker; Bill Masterman	New Zealand; Roger Craddock; Steve Cunnold	
1997	GBR 3521; Steve Goacher (GBR); Phil Evans (GBR)	Great Britain; Rupert Mander; Chris Hewkin	Great Britain; David McKee; Sally McKee	
1999	GBR 3621 - Two Lunches; Steve Goacher (GBR); Phil Evans (GBR)	GBR 3648 - Gecko; Mike Hart (GBR); Chris Gowers (GBR)	GBR 3611 - Scratch And Sniff; Alan Bax (GBR); Bill Masterman (GBR)	
2001	GBR 3591; Charles Apthorp (GBR); Andy Weatherspoon (GBR)	GBR 3721; Steve Goacher (GBR); Phil Evans (GBR)	GBR 3648; Mike Hart (GBR); Chris Gowers (GBR)	
2003	GBR 3630; Barry Parkin (GBR); Sue Parkin (GBR)	GBR 3703; Mike Hart (GBR); Richard Rigg (GBR)	AUS 3781; Rod Beurteaux (AUS); Chris O'Keefe (AUS)	
2005	AUS 3743 - Spot The Difference; Nick Jerwood (AUS); Janet Jerwood (AUS)	GBR 3591 - Fourwinds; Charles Apthorp (GBR); Alan Green (GBR)	NZL 3739 - Ffortune; Aaron Goodmanson (NZL); Alister Rowlands (NZL)	
2007	GBR 3817; Mike Hart (GBR); Tim Hall (GBR)	GBR 3721; Steve Goacher (GBR); Phil Evans (GBR)	NZL 3739; Aaron Goodmanson (NZL); Alister Rowlands (NZL)	
2009	AUS 3833; Grant Alderson (AUS); Dean McAullay (AUS)	GBR 3911; Barry Parkin (GBR); Tim Hall (GBR)	GBR 3821; Steve Goacher (GBR); Phil Evans (GBR)	
2011	GBR 3972; Graham Vials (GBR); Chris Turner (GBR)	GBR 3928; Mike McIntyre (GBR); Gemma McIntyre (GBR)	GBR 3902; Andy McKee (GBR); Richard Jones (GBR)	
2013	GBR 4004 Foof; Graham Vials (GBR); Chris Turner (GBR)	AUS 3986 Ineffable; Nick Jerwood (AUS); Janet Jerwood (AUS)	AUS 3933 El Toro; Grant ALDERSON (AUS); Dean McAullay (AUS)	
2015	GBR 4004; Graham Vials (GBR); Chris Turner (GBR)	GBR 3760; Jérémy Davy (GBR); Martin Huett (GBR)	GBR 4030; Greg Wells (GBR); Richard Rigg (GBR)	
2017	GBR 4021; Steve Goacher (GBR); Tim Harper (GBR)	AUS 3986 - Ineffable; Nick Jerwood (AUS); Janet Jerwood (AUS)	NZL 3840 - Ffrenetic; Murray Gilbert (NZL); Jonathan BURGESS (NZL)	
2019	GBR 4071 - Floaty McFloatFace; Graham Vials (GBR); Chris Turner (GBR)	GBR 4005 - Fiery Chariot; Andy McKee (GBR); Richard Jones (GBR)	GBR 4002 - Hyderated; Richard Lovering (GBR); Matt Alvarado (GBR)	
2023	GBR 4071 - Floaty McFloat Face; Graham Vials (GBR); Chris Turner (GBR)	4105 - Best Foot Forward; Nick Jerwood (AUS); Brad Sheridan (AUS)	3980 - Ffast Lane 3 Lachy Gilmour (AUS); Ryan Donaldson (AUS)	
2025	GBR 4005- Pond Skater; Graham Vials (GBR); Chris Turner (GBR)	GBR 4005- Andrew Mckee (GBR); Richard Jones (GBR)	GBR 4002; Ben McGrane (GBR); Russ Clark (GBR)	
