= Volvo Dún Laoghaire Regatta =

Irish sailing regatta

The Volvo Dún Laoghaire Regatta (originally launched as the Dun Laoghaire Regatta in 2005) is a biennial sailing regatta hosted by the Dun Laoghaire Motor Yacht Club, National Yacht Club, Royal Irish Yacht Club, and Royal St George Yacht Club in Dublin Bay, Ireland. With 2500 sailors and 400 boats competing in 28 classes, it is the largest sailing regatta in Ireland and the second largest in the British Isles. The inaugural event was held in 2005, and the next event is scheduled for 6–9 July 2017.
