= Blessington Sailing Club =

Irish yacht club

Coordinates: 53°7′43″N 06°31′20″W

- Nickname: BLSC
- Founded: 1960
- Location: Poulaphouca Reservoir
- Website: blessingtonsailingclub.com

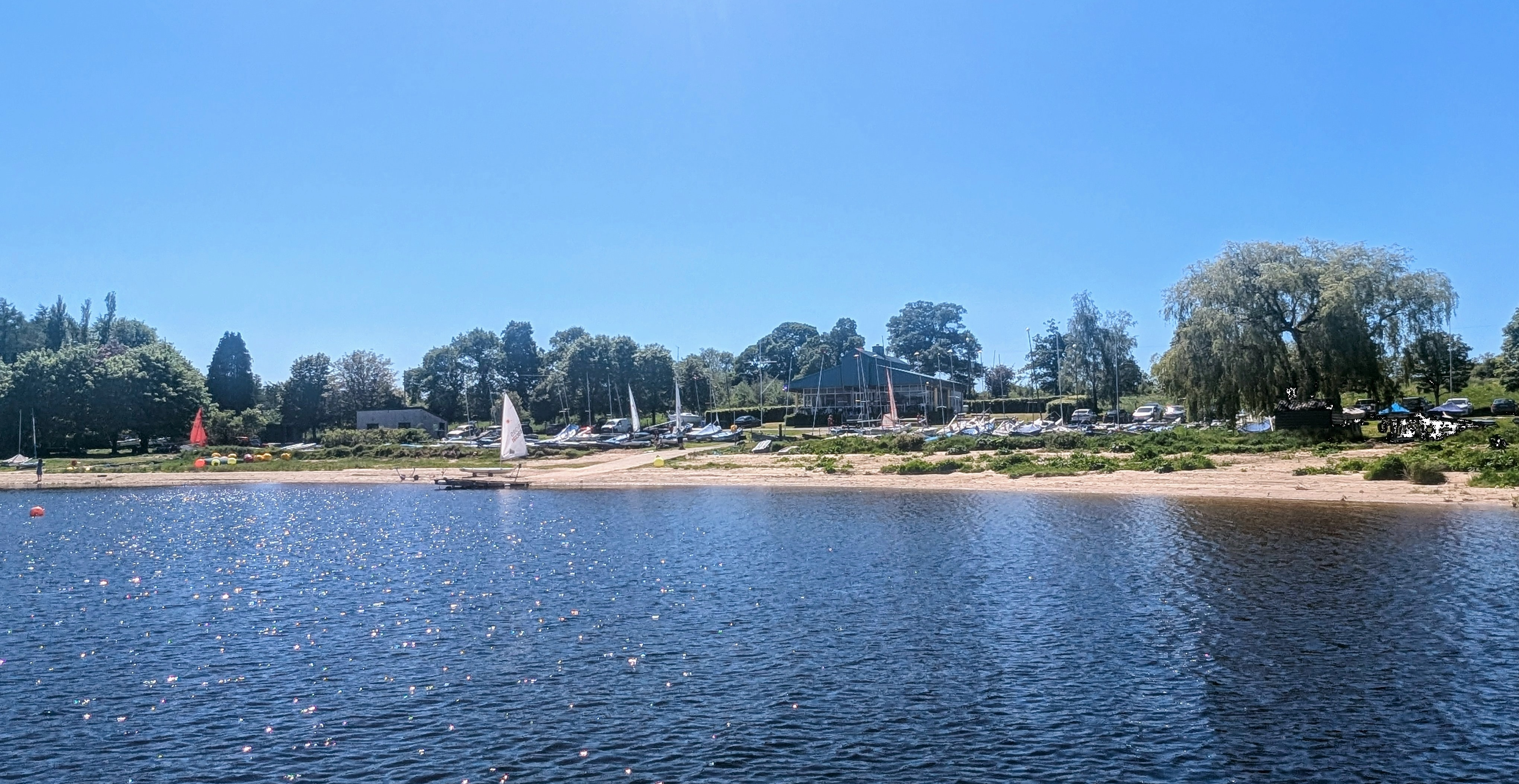
Blessington Sailing Club

Blessington Sailing Club is a yacht club located on the Baltyboys shore at Poulaphouca Reservoir, outside Blessington, County Wicklow in Ireland. It hosts several regattas every year, which sometimes include national championships for various dinghy classes. The club receives some financial support from the Irish government's Community Sports Facilities Fund.

== History ==
Blessington Sailing Club was founded on 8 May 1960 with the launch of an Enterprise dinghy. The club's first commodore, Captain P. Harboard, chose the Enterprise class as the club's first fleet because of its versatility.

The club expanded quickly and hosted a number of national and international regattas within a few years of its founding. The Irish Independent reported that a 1963 regatta was the first ever for the Fireball class dinghy. In the late 1960s and early 1970s, the club hosted a Military Cup regatta where a team from the Irish Defence Forces competed against a civilian team.

By 1970, the club was hosting larger regattas. The 1970 Open Meeting, held in July, attracted 83 boats from six classes, including a number of Fireballs.

The club began outreach programs in the 1980s where it worked with the Vocational Education Committee.

== Fleet ==
The club maintains a fleet of Laser Bahias for racing and training. There is also a cohort of RS400s and RS200s that actively race. In addition, the club also has GP14s and Wayfarers.

== Notable members ==
- Finn Lynch
- Cora McNaughton

== See also ==
- Royal Irish Yacht Club
- National Yacht Club
- Royal Cork Yacht Club
- Royal St. George Yacht Club
