= Yacht club =

Sports club specifically related to yachting

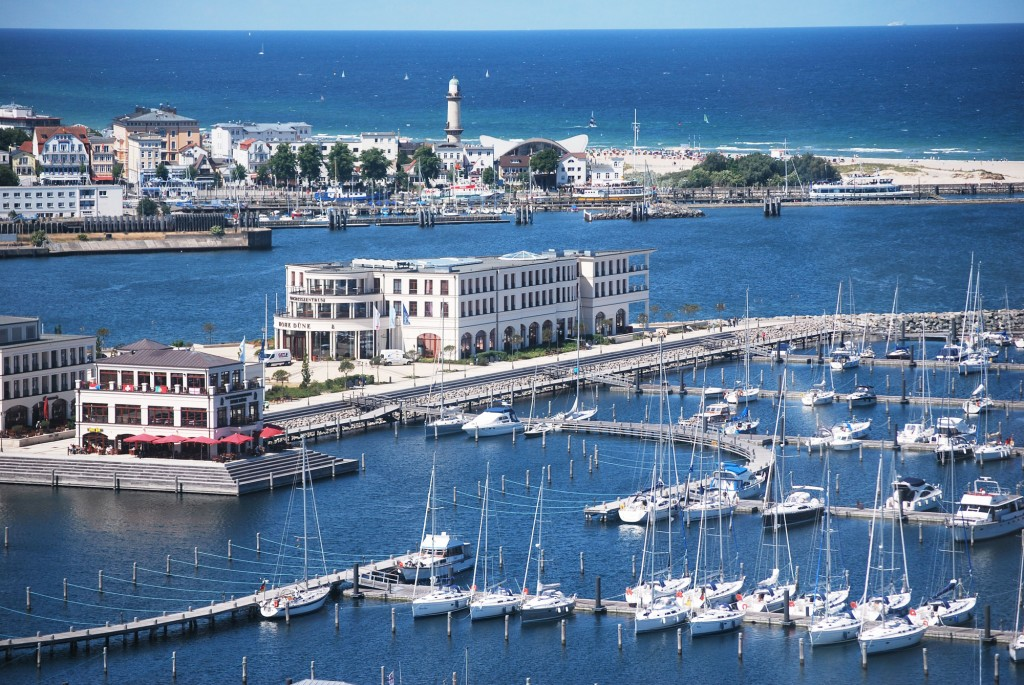
Aerial view of yacht club and marina Yacht Harbour Residence "Hohe Düne" in Rostock, Germany.

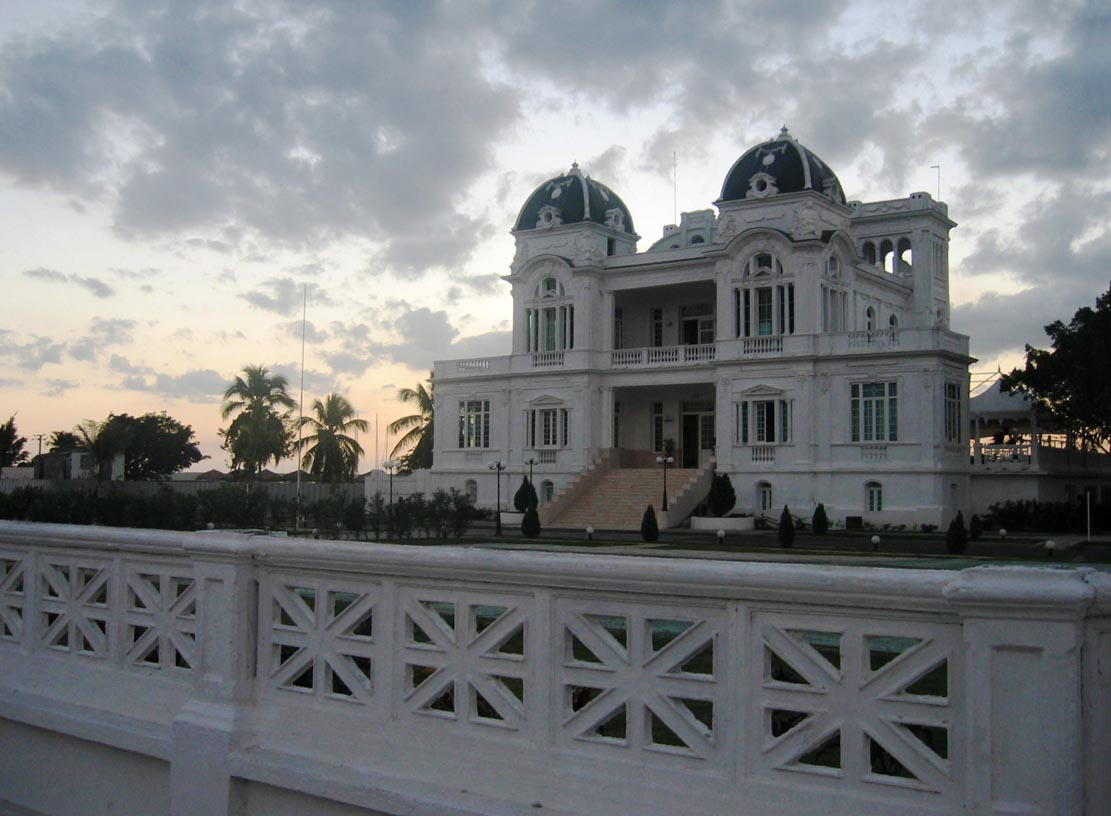
The clubhouse of the yacht club in Cienfuegos, Cuba

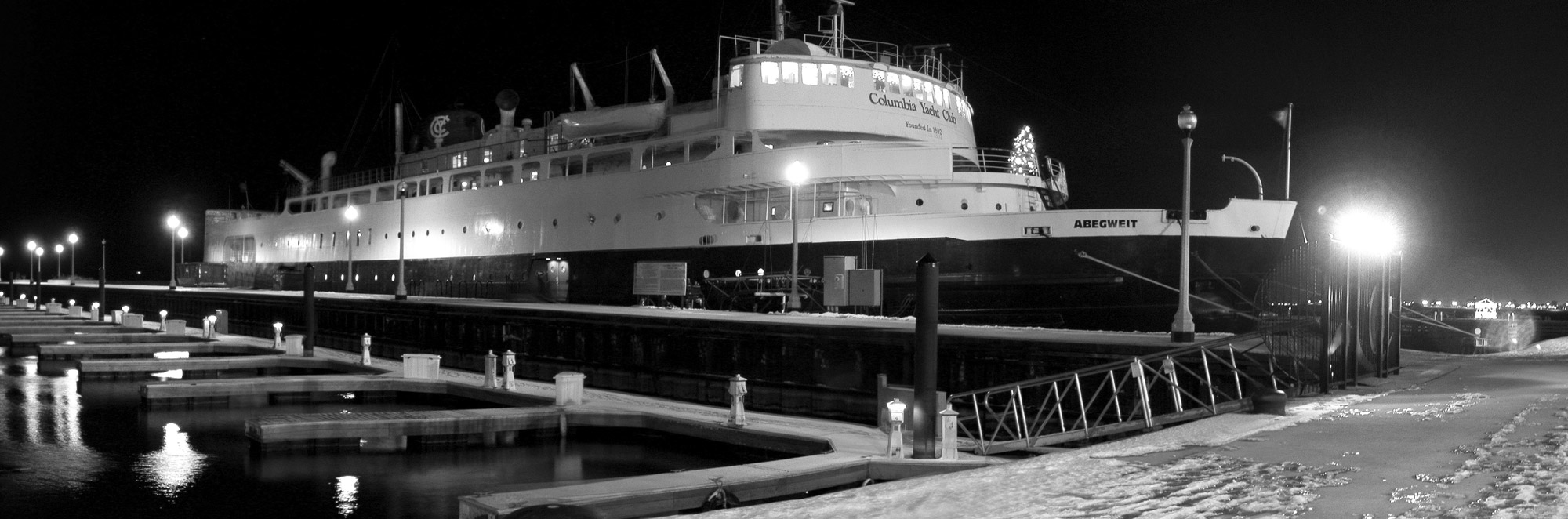
Columbia yacht club in Chicago, Illinois

Britannia Yacht Club in Ottawa, Ontario Clubhouse & Marquis tent

A yacht club is a boat club specifically related to yachting.

== Description ==
Yacht clubs are mostly located by the sea, although there some that have been established at a lake or riverside location. Yacht or sailing clubs typically have either a marina or a delimited section of the beach or shoreline with buoys marking the areas off-limits for swimmers as well as safe offshore anchorages. On shore they also include a perimeter reserved for the exclusive use of the members of the club as well as a clubhouse with attached bar, café or restaurant where members socialize in a pleasant and informal setting.

Although the terms Yacht Club and Sailing Club tend to be synonymous, some general differences regarding the recreational use of boats can be broadly outlined. Historically a Yacht Club tended to focus on a membership composed of yacht owners, including motorboats. This type of club often was extremely exclusive, attracting the aristocracy or the high class and leaving small boat owners out of the circle. On the other hand, a Sailing Club tended to focus on a membership composed exclusively of owners of sailboats, including smaller boats such as dinghies. These became very popular towards the end of the 19th century when small boats began to be produced on an industrial scale.

Yacht clubs are often known by their initials (e.g. New York Yacht Club abbreviated as NYYC and Kingston Yacht Club abbreviated as KYC). Many well known yacht clubs, including the Yacht Club de France, the Yacht Club Italiano and the Royal Yacht Squadron, have been established under royal patronage or have been granted the title at some point in their history.

Organized and run by the membership, yacht clubs became a place to promote the sport of sailboat racing and cruising, as well as provide a meeting place for the particular social community. The membership is a mixture of people with specific recreational affinities, and the members often include those who sail as crew for cruising or racing, as well as boat owners. It is up to the members to decide on the objectives of the club to satisfy the membership and to attract other like-minded individuals. For example, some clubs include owners of powerboats, while others specifically exclude them. In order to overcome difficulties concerning the affinities of their members, some clubs may have sections devoted to sailing and a powerboats respectively.

Members Clubs often have paid staff for catering, bar duty, boat yard duty, accounts, office etc. Control and organization of the club is done for the membership via members elected by the membership into roles such as Sailing Secretary, Commodore, Cruising Captain, Racing Captain etc. Smaller clubs typically have a condition of membership which requires active participation of the membership in activities such as maintenance of club facilities and equipment.

Unlike the classical clubs where the membership is the focus, certain 'clubs' are run on a commercial basis. They may be owned by individuals or a company to provide a service and generate a profit. Often they are associated with a particular marina or port. Objectives other than the profit are usually broadly similar to members clubs, but the social side may be more dominant.

== Traditions ==
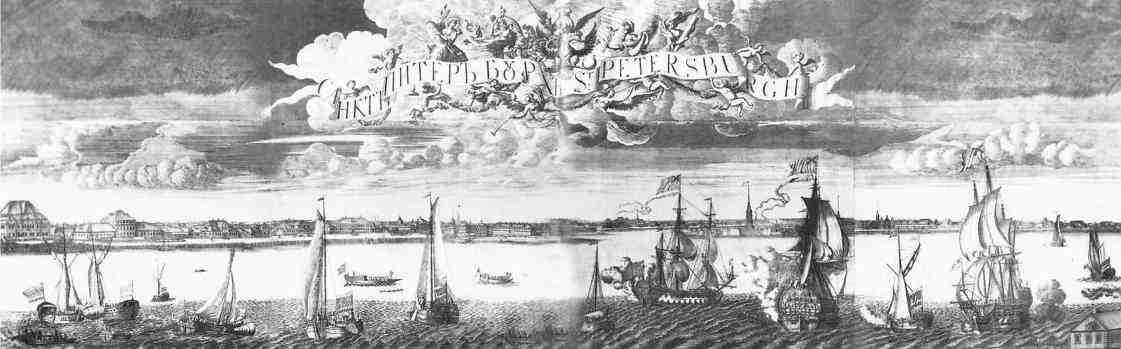
A view of St. Petersburg by Alexey Zubov, 1716, shows yachts and war ships on the Neva River.

There is a long historical tradition behind yacht clubs. According to the date of establishment, the Neva Yacht Club, founded in 1718 in Russia, is the oldest yacht club. However, since this Russian Yacht Club was established by a decree of Tsar Peter the Great, it does not fully qualify as a proper club in the modern sense, understood as a voluntary association of members who organize and run the club. Therefore, the Royal Cork Yacht Club founded in Ireland in 1720 is also widely acknowledged as the oldest yacht club in the world, despite having gone through periods of dormancy and undergone name changes in its long history, much in the same manner as the Neva Yacht Club. It was only in 1846 that the first yacht club in Russia to adopt British-style Members Club regulations was established. Using this Western understanding of what a club or society is, the Royal Swedish Yacht Club, KSSS, founded 1830, becomes the oldest European yacht club outside the British Isles, and the fifth oldest in the world.

A number of the world's most renowned Yacht Clubs are located in the United Kingdom, Australia, Germany, Canada, and the United States. The first yacht club in North America was the Royal Nova Scotia Yacht Squadron, located on the Northwest Arm in Halifax, Nova Scotia, Canada established in July 1837. Some yacht clubs are affiliated with an international body, the International Council of Yacht Clubs, which exists to improve the quality of the services yacht clubs provide to their members as well as to promote environmental awareness and responsibility towards the environment.

The Kieler Yacht-Club in Northern Germany organizes the yearly Kiel Week, the second-biggest sailing event in the world, which is celebrated since 1882. Kiel Week was an attempt to imitate the much older and larger Cowes Week, long-admired by Wilhelm II.

=== Racing and sailing activities ===
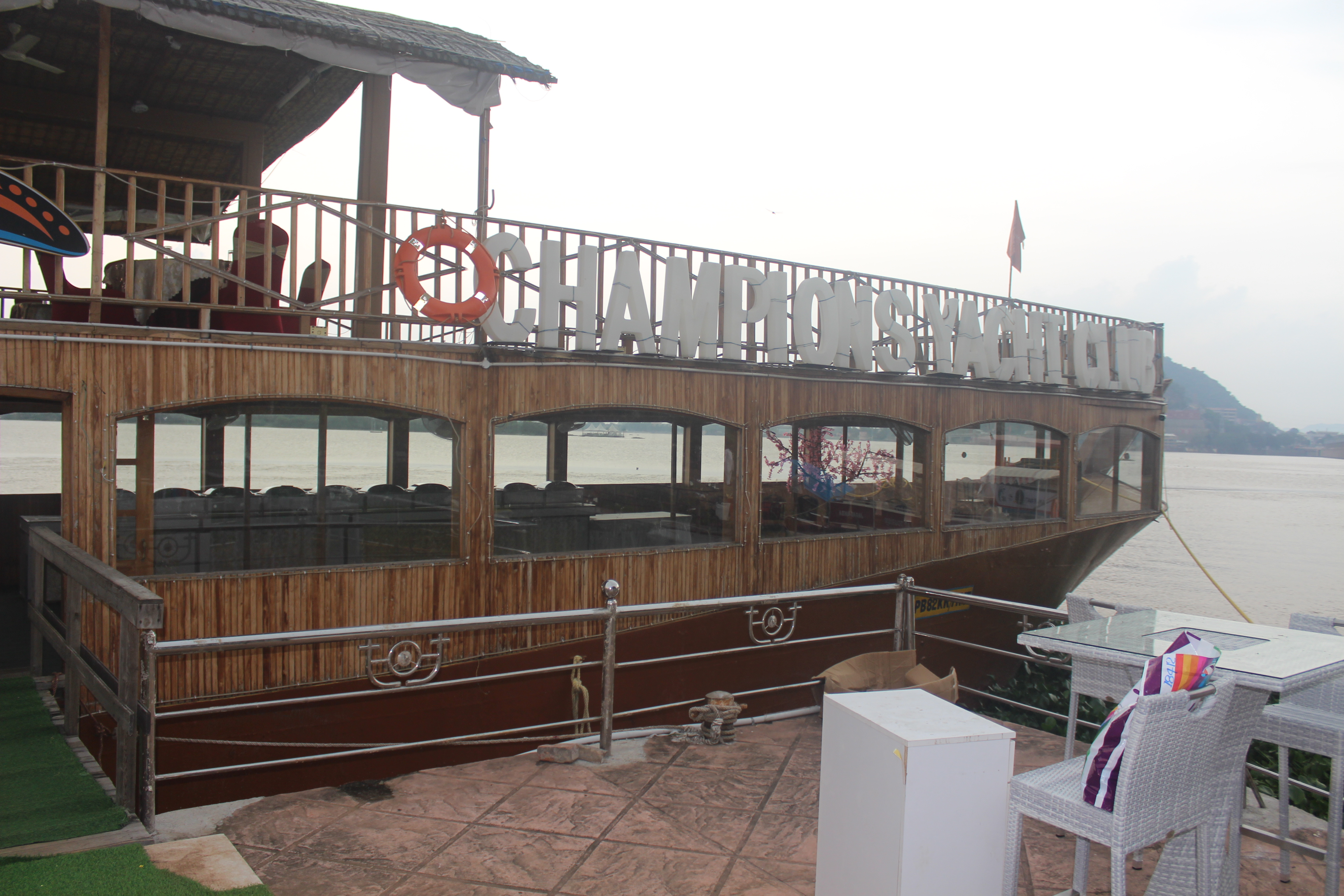
Champions Yacht Club in Vijayawada, India

Most clubs, regardless of the size of their craft, have a well defined racing program. Clubs may host regattas ranging from informal local events to national championships. Often clubs have a regular weekday evening racing schedule or a weekend racing schedule organized by the membership. Many yacht clubs field teams to compete against other clubs in team racing. There are also some specific boat models and lengths which have their own club. These boat ownership clubs often hold single design races for their members. With the growth of sailing at secondary schools and universities, many yacht clubs host Interscholastic Sailing Association or Intercollegiate Sailing Association regattas. Additionally, a number of yacht clubs enter into agreements with schools to provide dock space and practice facilities for the school teams year-round.

Clubs with active adult sailing programs most often feature junior sailing programs as well. Most often these programs enroll children from ages 8 to 16. Children most often learn to sail in the optimist dinghy and then progress to a larger single handed dinghy, such as the starling or the laser dinghy, or two handed, such as the 420 dinghy. These junior sailing programs often also teach children rowing, kayaking, general seamanship and navigation. Children are also taught how to race competitively from an early age and most clubs host junior sailing regattas each season.

=== Yacht club burgee ===
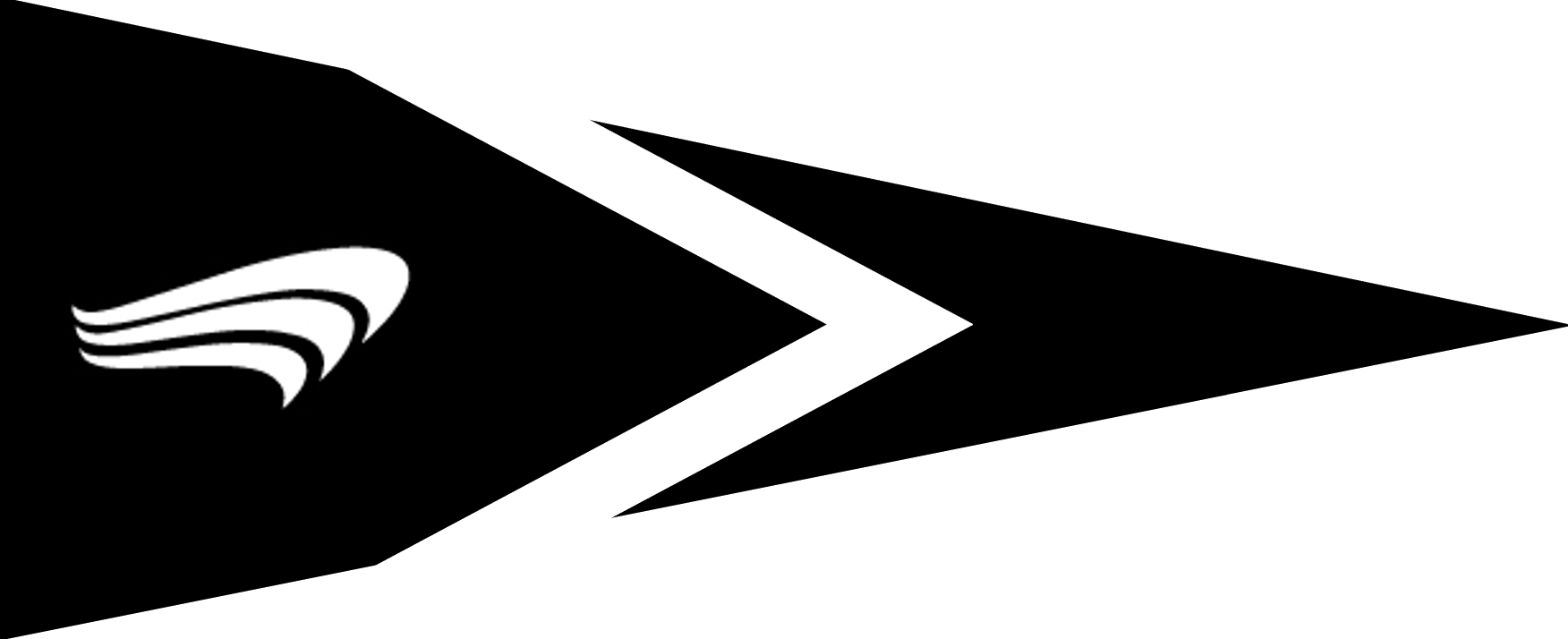
Adelaide University Sailing Club, Adelaide, South Australia

Members belonging to a yacht club or sailing organization may fly their club's unique flag (usually triangular), called a burgee, both while under way and at anchor (however, not while racing). Traditionally, the burgee was flown from the main masthead; however, it may also be flown from a small pole on the bow pulpit, or on the starboard rigging beneath the lowest starboard spreader on a flag halyard. Some traditional clubs have also been granted the right to fly a special yacht ensign at the stern.

At traditional clubs the burgee and the ensign is hoisted at 08:00 each morning and lowered each evening at sunset. This ceremony is called colors. Traditionally, the first time a member of one club visits another, there is an exchange of burgees. Exchanged burgees are often displayed on the premises of clubs, such as at their clubhouse or bar.

=== Organization ===
Yacht clubs are organized like any other club or organisation with committees, chairman, directors, etc. Due to the connection with the sea and hence the navy, the various posts use naval terminology. For example, the chairman/CEO is the Commodore. Usually, under the Commodore there are also the Vice Commodore (in charge of land-based activities) and the Rear Commodore (in charge of water-based activities); for clubs in the United States they might in turn be assisted by the Port Captain and the Fleet Captain respectively. In a few clubs in the United Kingdom the Admiral, which is one rank above the Commodore, is the senior officer. Each of these ranks has specific responsibilities to ensure the smooth sailing of the club.

=== Clubhouse or shore station ===
Members of yacht clubs typically gather at a clubhouse or shore station which may also have docks. The oldest yacht club in the world without a clubhouse is Sheldrake Yacht Club (Mamaroneck, New York).

== Use of the term "yacht club" ==
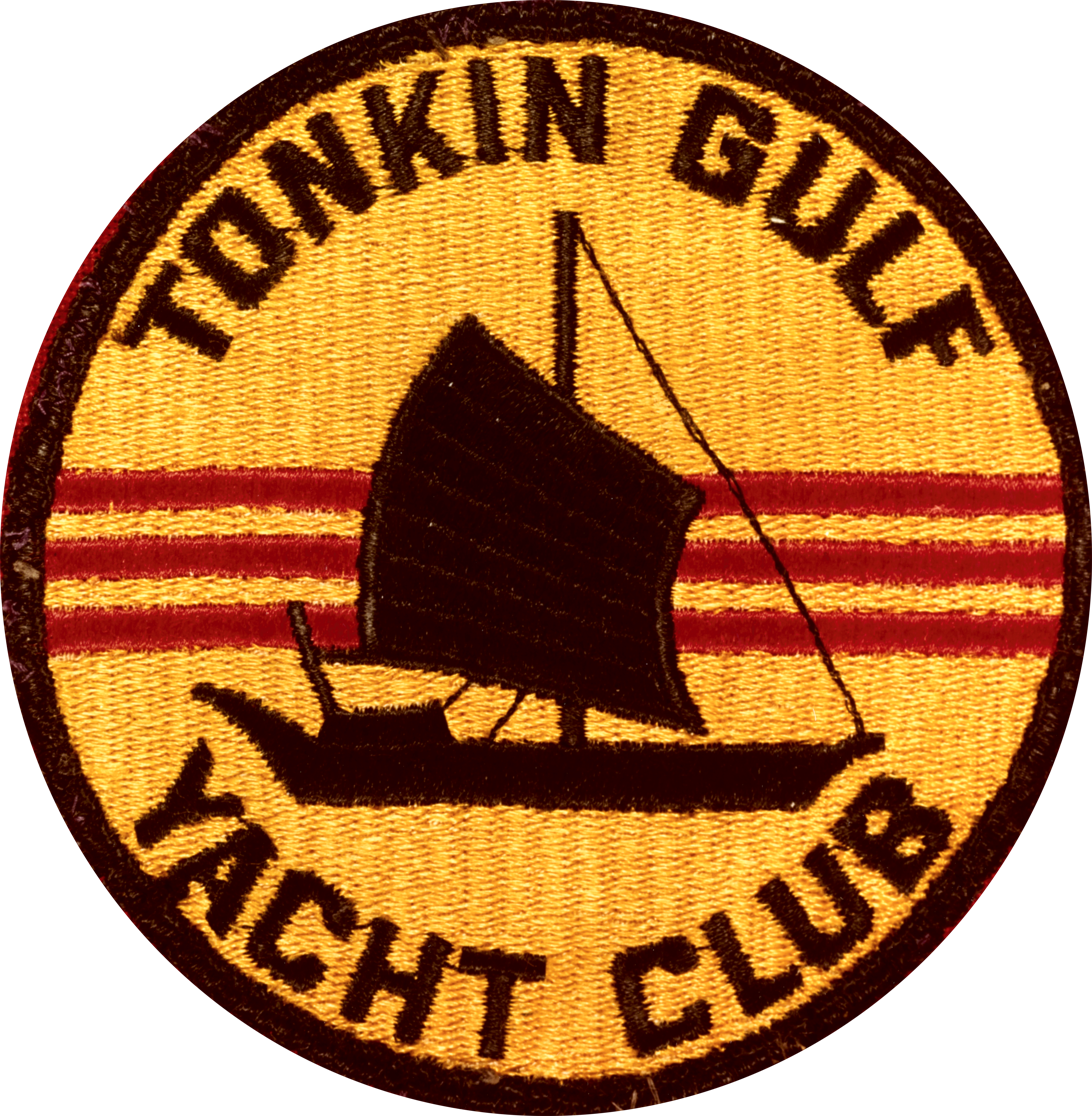
Military humor: Badge of the Tonkin Gulf Yacht Club -aka US 7th Fleet-

The traditions and prestige normally associated with yacht clubs have to some extent been subverted or appropriated unofficially by groups and businesses calling themselves "yacht clubs". For example, the "Gowanus Yacht Club" is a beer garden restaurant in Brooklyn, NY, the Van Buren Yacht Club is a bar and hotel in Maine, the "Crystal Bay Yacht Club" is a beach resort in Ko Samui, Thailand and "The Eagle Rock Yacht Club" is a non-profit dodgeball league in Glassell Park, Los Angeles. These so-called "yacht clubs" don't necessarily involve sailing on private yachts of members as their main purpose or activity, but often outwardly maintain a nautical or water-oriented theme.

Tonkin Gulf Yacht Club was the unofficial name for the United States Seventh Fleet during the Vietnam War. In this case the term "yacht club" was appropriated with humorous intentions. The Seventh Fleet's nickname became very popular among its members at the time.

== Oldest clubs ==
=== Oldest European clubs ===
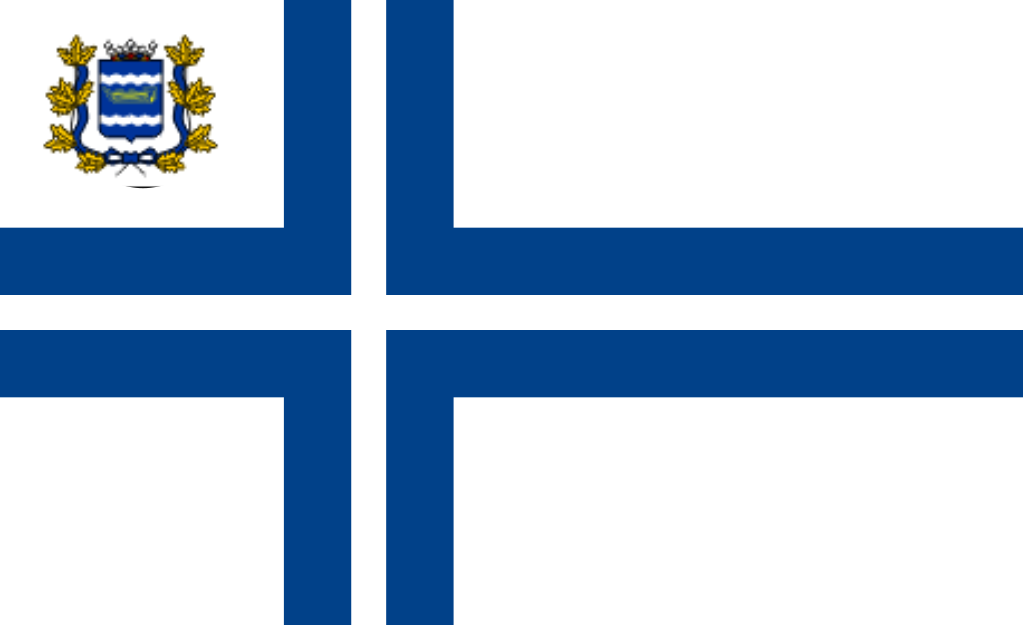
Ensign of NJK. Finnish yachts are allowed to fly their club's ensign in place of the national civil ensign, from which it is derived.

The oldest yacht clubs are:

- 1718 Neva Yacht Club in St. Petersburg, Russia.
- 1720 Royal Cork Yacht Club in Cork, Ireland
- 1770 Lough Ree Yacht Club in Ballyglass, Ireland
- 1772 Starcross Yacht Club on the Exe estuary in England
- 1775 Cumberland Fleet also known as the Royal Thames Yacht Club, in England
- 1815 The Yacht Club in London, England, renamed the Royal Yacht Squadron in 1833
- 1823 Thames Yacht Club in England
- 1827 Port of Plymouth Royal Clarence Regatta Club in Plymouth, England, becoming the Royal Western Yacht Club in 1833
- 1827 Royal Western Yacht Club of Ireland dissolved later in the century
- 1830 Royal Swedish Yacht Club in Stockholm, Sweden
- 1831 Royal Irish Yacht Club in Dun Laoghaire, Dublin, Ireland
- 1835 Lough Derg Yacht Club in County Tipperary, Ireland
- 1837 Royal Southampton Yacht Club (renamed Royal Southern Yacht Club in 1844)
- 1838 Royal London Yacht Club (founded as the Arundel Yacht Club) in London, England (later moved to Cowes)
- 1838 Royal St. George Yacht Club (founded as the Kingstown Boat Club) in Dun Laoghaire, Ireland
- 1838 Deben Yacht Club in Woodbridge, United Kingdom
- 1844 Royal Mersey Yacht Club in Rock Ferry, United Kingdom
- 1845 Royal Harwich Yacht Club in England
- 1847 Royal Welsh Yacht Club in Wales
- 1847 Koninklijke Nederlandsche Zeil en Roei Vereeniging, Netherlands
- 1855 Segelclub Rhe in Hamburg, Germany
- 1856 Lisbon Naval Association in Lisbon, Portugal
- 1857 Kingstown Model Yacht Club in Kingstown, Ireland, renamed the Royal Alfred Yacht Club in 1870
- 1858 Società delle Regate in Belgirate, Italy
- 1860 Royal Windermere Yacht Club in England
- 1863 Royal Torbay Yacht Club in Devon, England
- 1865 Airisto Segelsällskap in Turku, Finland
- 1866 Royal Danish Yacht Club in Copenhagen, Denmark
- 1867 Yacht Club de France in Paris, France
- 1867 Berliner Yacht Club in Berlin, Germany
- 1867 Balatonfüredi Yacht Club in Balatonfüred, Hungary
- 1870 Thames Sailing Club in England
- 1871 National Yacht Club (founded as Kingstown Royal Harbour Boat Club) in Dun Laoghaire, Dublin, Ireland
- 1875 Black Sea Yacht Club in Odesa, Ukraine
- 1875 Bristol Channel Yacht Club in Wales

=== Oldest North American clubs ===
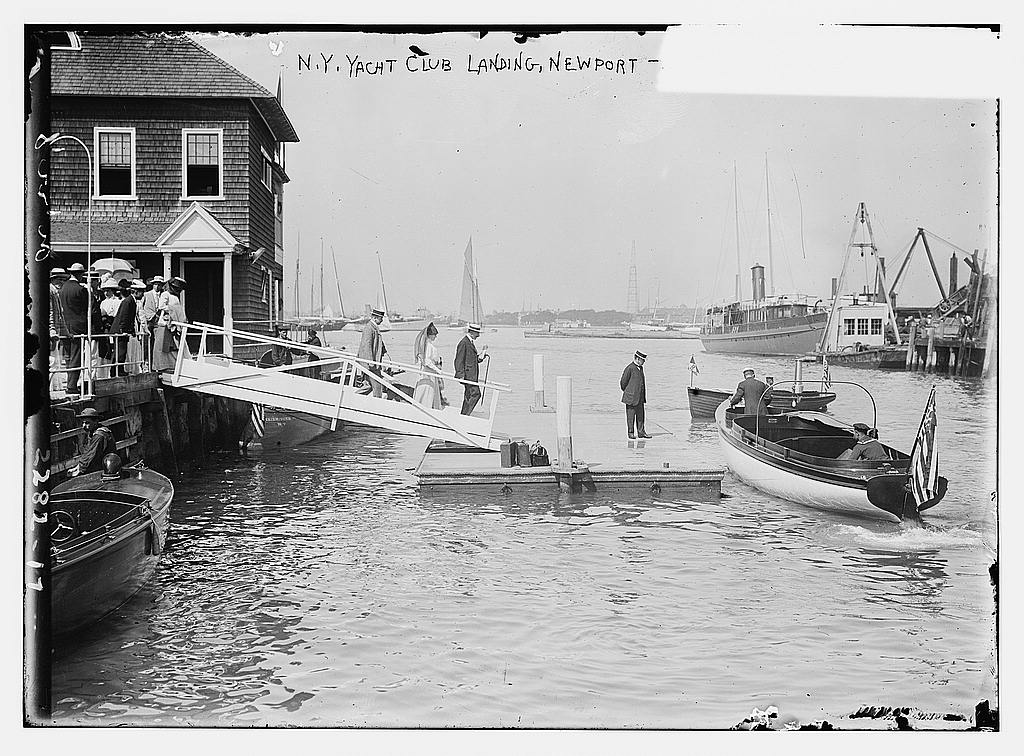
New York Yacht Club Landing in Newport c. 1910s

The oldest yacht clubs are:

- 1837 Royal Nova Scotia Yacht Squadron in Halifax, Nova Scotia
- 1839 Detroit Boat Club in Detroit, Michigan.
- 1844 New York Yacht Club in Newport, Rhode Island
- 1847 Mobile Yacht Club in Mobile, Alabama
- 1849 Biloxi Yacht Club in Biloxi, Mississippi
- 1849 Southern Yacht Club in Louisiana
- 1850 Springfield Yacht & Canoe Club in Springfield, Massachusetts
- 1852 Royal Canadian Yacht Club in Toronto, Ontario
- 1853 Carolina Yacht Club in Wrightsville Beach, North Carolina
- 1857 Maryland Club in Baltimore, Maryland
- 1860 Buffalo Yacht Club in Buffalo, New York
- 1861 Quebec Yacht Club in Quebec, Quebec
- 1864 Neenah Nodaway Yacht Club in Neenah, Wisconsin
- 1865 Raritan Yacht Club in Perth Amboy, New Jersey
- 1865 Riverton Yacht Club in Riverton, New Jersey
- 1865 Toledo Yacht Club in Toledo, Ohio
- 1867 Longueuil Boating Club in Longueuil, Quebec
- 1869 New Hamburg Yacht Club (founded as New Hamburg Ice Yacht Club) in New Hamburg, New York
- 1869 San Francisco Yacht Club, first club on the West Coast of the US
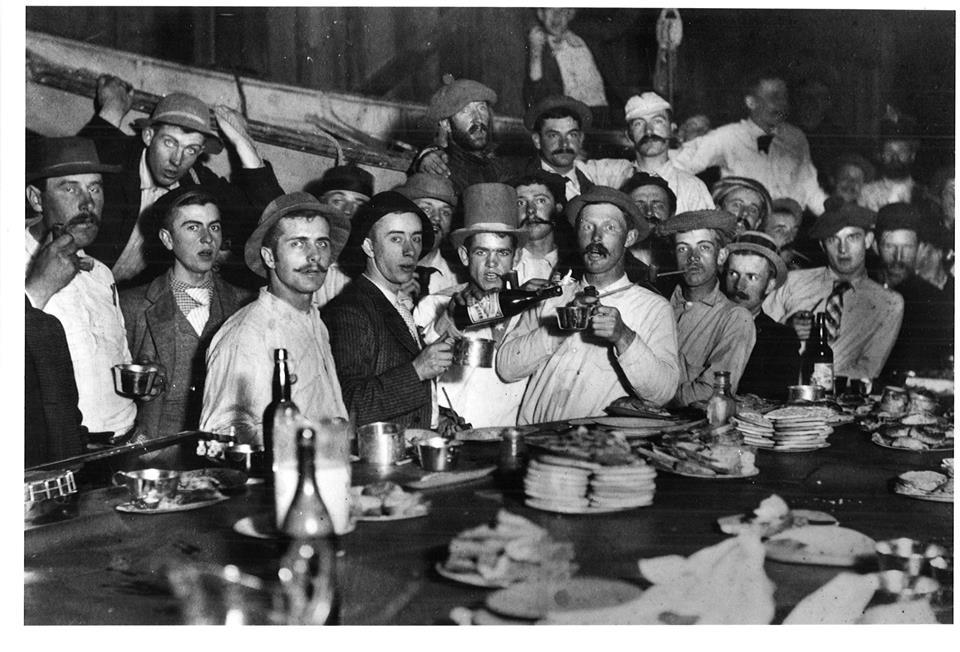
  Corinthian Yacht Club members celebrate the end of the 1889 season
- 1870 Eastern Yacht Club, in Marblehead, Massachusetts
- 1871 Milwaukee Yacht Club, in Milwaukee, Wisconsin
- 1871 Seawanhaka Corinthian Yacht Club, in Centre Island, New York
- 1872 Beverly Yacht Club, in Marion, Massachusetts
- 1874 Lake Geneva Yacht Club, in Fontana WI
- 1875 Savin Hill Yacht Club in Dorchester, Massachusetts
- 1875 Rhode Island Yacht Club, in Cranston, Rhode Island
- 1876 Florida Yacht Club, in Jacksonville, Florida
- 1877 Bristol Yacht Club, in Bristol, Rhode Island
- 1877 Rochester Yacht Club, Rochester, New York
- 1877 New Bedford Yacht Club, in New Bedford, Massachusetts
- 1878 The Cleveland Yachting Club, in Rocky River, Ohio
- 1879 Monmouth Boat Club, in Red Bank, New Jersey
- 1880 Larchmont Yacht Club, in Larchmont, New York
- 1882 Minnetonka Yacht Club, in Deephaven, Minnesota
- 1883 The Harlem Yacht Club, on City Island, Bronx, New York
- 1883 American Yacht Club, in Rye, New York
- 1886 Shelter Island Yacht Club, in Shelter Island, New York
- 1886 Put-in-Bay Yacht Club, in Put-in-Bay, Ohio
- 1887 Lake Champlain Yacht Club, Shelburne, Vermont
- 1888 Bay Head Yacht Club, Bay Head, New Jersey
- 1888 Carolina Yacht Club, Charleston, South Carolina
- 1890 Tacoma Yacht Club, in Tacoma, Washington
- 1891 Canandaigua Yacht Club, in Canandaigua, New York
- 1891 Manhasset Bay Yacht Club, in Port Washington, New York
- 1892 Seattle Yacht Club, in Seattle, Washington
- 1894 Huguenot Yacht Club, in New Rochelle, New York
- 1896 South Bay Yacht Club, in Alviso, California - SF Bay Area
- 1901 Los Angeles Yacht Club, in San Pedro, California
- 1904 Cobbosseecontee Yacht Club on Cobbosseecontee Lake, Kennebec County, Maine
- 1905 Lake Hopatcong Yacht Club, in Mount Arlington, New Jersey
- 1907 Sheldrake Yacht Club, in Mamaroneck, New York
- 1928 Ida Lewis Yacht Club, in Newport, Rhode Island

=== Oldest clubs rest of the world ===
- 1826 Republic of Singapore Yacht Club, Singapore
- 1844 Royal Bermuda Yacht Club, Bermuda
- 1849 Royal Hong Kong Yacht Club, Hong Kong, China
- 1853 Royal Yacht Club of Victoria, Melbourne, Australia
- 1858 Royal Natal Yacht Club, South Africa – oldest yacht club in Africa
- 1862 Royal Sydney Yacht Squadron, Australia
- 1865 Royal Perth Yacht Club, Australia
- 1867 Royal Prince Alfred Yacht Club, Sydney, Australia
- 1871 Royal New Zealand Yacht Squadron, New Zealand
- 1883 Yacht Club Argentino, Argentina
- 1883 Clube Naval de Luanda, Angola
- 1885 Royal Queensland Yacht Squadron, Brisbane, Australia
- 1891 Sydney Flying Squadron, Australia
- 1896 Royal Freshwater Bay Yacht Club, Perth, Australia
- 1907 Albay Yacht Club, Philippines

== See also ==
- List of yacht clubs
- Yachting
