= Graham Vials =

British sailor

Personal information
- Nationality: United Kingdom
- Born: 1982 or 1983 (age 42–43) Darlington, United Kingdom

Sport
- Sport: Sailing
Medal record
Sailing
Representing United Kingdom
Youth Sailing World Championships
Silver medal – second place	1997 Fukuoka	Boy's 420
Flying Fifteen World Championship
Gold medal – first place	2011 Hayling Island
Gold medal – first place	2013 Hong Kong
Gold medal – first place	2015 Crozon-Morgat
Gold medal – first place	2019 Dún Laoghaire
Gold medal – first place	2023 Perth
Gold medal – first place	2025 Weymouth
Flying Fifteen British National Championship
Gold medal – first place	2014 Parkstone
Gold medal – first place	2019 Parkstone
Gold medal – first place	2021 Rhu
Gold medal – first place	2022 Hayling Island

Graham Vials (born 1980) is a British sailor who sails at Derwent Reservoir Sailing Club and has won the Flying Fifteen World Championship a record six times alongside his crew Chris Turner. The duo won their first in 2011 at Hayling Island Sailing Club and won their sixth at the 2025 World Championship at Weymouth and Portland National Sailing Academy. Vials has also won the British National Championships 4 times.

== Early life ==
Vials grew up in Darlington in County Durham.

== Career ==
=== Early career and 470 campaign ===
Vials begun his sailing career in an Optimist, a small, single-handed dinghy designed for sailors under the age of fifteen. He then moved into a 420, which saw him come second at the 1997 ISAF Youth Sailing World Championships in the Boy's 420. He then moved into a 470 in 2001. At his first European Championships in the 470 he placed 12th sailing with Dan Newman. He missed out on qualifying for both the 2000 and 2004 Summer Olympics, going to Athens as a reserve in 2004.

=== Post 470 ===
He sailed a Moth for much of the late 2000s, placing 7th at the 2008 Worlds.

=== Flying Fifteen ===
His first Flying Fifteen World Championship came in 2011, where he won the event without competing in the final race. Over the next fourteen years he would win a total of six world championships becoming the most successful Flying Fifteen helm of all time.
