= International Council of Yacht Clubs =

International Council of Yacht Clubs (ICOYC)
- Formation: 2005
- Legal status: Active
- Purpose: Advocate and public voice, educator and network for Recreational boating, and competitive sailors, coaches, volunteers and events; improve the quality of the services yacht clubs provide to their members, as well as promoting environmental awareness and responsibility towards the environment.
- Official language: English

The International Council of Yacht Clubs (ICOYC) is an international organization that operates at the level of Commodores of yacht clubs through a Commodores’ Forum.

Its vision is to improve the quality of the services yacht clubs provide to their members, as well as promoting environmental awareness and responsibility towards the environment.

Among its practical objectives, the main thrust is to identify areas of interest and areas of concern among member clubs and to share information and experience on these areas. The ICOYC also would like to promote fellowship and informal contact among member clubs by means of sailing events as well as social activities.

== Membership ==
The membership of the ICOYC is composed of prestigious yacht clubs in key yachting locations around the world, from Africa to Asia and the Pacific. Its main members are: Royal Natal Yacht Club, Annapolis Yacht Club, Chicago Yacht Club, Eastern Yacht Club, Long Beach Yacht Club, California, Newport Harbor Yacht Club, Royal Canadian Yacht Club, Royal Vancouver Yacht Club, San Diego Yacht Club, San Francisco Yacht Club, Seattle Yacht Club, Southern Yacht Club, St. Francis Yacht Club, Republic of Singapore Yacht Club, Royal Hong Kong Yacht Club, Royal Varuna Yacht Club, Royal Freshwater Bay Yacht Club, Royal New Zealand Yacht Squadron, Royal Perth Yacht Club, Royal Queensland Yacht Squadron, Royal Sydney Yacht Squadron, Sandringham Yacht Club, Bruxelles Royal Yacht Club, Clube Naval de Cascais, Gstaad Yacht Club, Royal Danish Yacht Club, Royal Norwegian Yacht Club, Royal Swedish Yacht Club, Norddeutscher Regatta Verein, Nyländska Jaktklubben, Royal Cork Yacht Club, Royal Malta Yacht Club, Société Nautique de Marseille, Verein Seglerhaus am Wannsee, Yacht Club Italiano and Royal Southern Yacht Club.

== History ==
Its origins can be traced to Canada, where there was a discussion at the Royal Vancouver Yacht Club (RVYC) in 2003 about the need of an international Yacht Club organization. Practical steps were taken in 2005 when the RVYC hosted the first Commodores’ Forum, attended by representatives of yacht clubs around the world.

The International Council of Yacht Clubs was finally established in 2006 in Hong Kong, when the Royal Hong Kong Yacht Club hosted the second Commodores’ Forum. This event was attended by 28 yacht clubs from five continents.

== See also ==
- Royal Yachting Association
- Watersports
- Yachting
- List of International Council of Yacht Clubs members
