= Andrew Ball =

Andrew Ball may refer to:

- Andrew Ball (Royal Navy officer) (died 1653), English navy captain
- Andrew Ball (sailor), New Zealand sailor
- Andrew Ball (Townsville pioneer) (died 1894), Queensland, Australia
- Andrew Ball (curler), 2010 Ontario Men's Curling Championship
- Andrew Ball (comics), writer of Marvel CyberComics
- Andrew Ball (pianist) (1950–2022) British pianist
