= 1997 ISAF Youth Sailing World Championships =

Event title
- Edition: 27th

Event details
- Venue: Fukuoka, Japan
- Dates: 24 July - 4 August 1997

The 1997 ISAF Youth Sailing World Championships took place in Fukuoka, Japan from July 24 to August 4 1997. It was the 27th edition of the ISAF Youth Sailing World Championships.

== Competition format ==
=== Events and equipment ===
Event	Equipment
Men's dinghy (single hander)	Laser
Men's dinghy (double hander)	420
Men's windsurfer	Minstral
Women's dinghy (single hander)	Laser Radial
Women's dinghy (double hander)	420
Women's windsurfer	Minstral

== Summary ==
=== Medal table ===
* Host nation (Japan)

Rank	Nation	Gold	Silver	Bronze	Total
1	France	2	2	0	4
2	Poland	1	0	1	2
3	Brazil	1	0	0	1
3	New Zealand	1	0	0	1
3	Sweden	1	0	0	1
6	Israel	0	1	1	2
7	Canada	0	1	0	1
7	Great Britain	0	1	0	1
7	Netherlands	0	1	0	1
10	Spain	0	0	2	2
11	Italy	0	0	1	1
11	Switzerland	0	0	1	1
Totals (12 entries)		6	6	6	18

=== Event medalists ===
==== Men's events ====
Event	First	Second	Third
Laser	Daniel Wallberg; Sweden	Bernard Luttmer; Canada	Francisco Sanchez Ferrer; Spain
420	Nicolas Charbonnier; Clement Faure; France	Graham Vials; Joe Glanfield; Great Britain	Josef Yogev; Shachaf Amir; Israel
Minstral	Ricardo Santos; Brazil	Julien Bontemps; France	Curro Manchón; Spain

==== Women's events ====
Event	First	Second	Third
Laser Radial	Sarah Macky; New Zealand	Clementine Destailleur; France	Katarzyna Deberny; Poland
420	Marion Barbarin; Elise Garreau; France	Johanna Innemee; Lobke Berkhout; Netherlands	Paola Richelli; Geemma Fiorentono; Italy
Minstral	Miroslawa Rymko; Poland	Anat Kolondy; Israel	Anja Kaser; Switzerland
