= Royal Irish Yacht Club =

Sporting organisation in Dún Laoghaire, Ireland

Coordinates: 53°17′40″N 06°07′57″W

- Burgee

- Ensign
- Nickname: RIYC
- Founded: 1831
- Location: Dún Laoghaire Harbour, County Dublin
- Website: http://www.riyc.ie

The Royal Irish Yacht Club is a yacht club located in Dún Laoghaire Harbour, County Dún Laoghaire–Rathdown, Republic of Ireland. The club was founded in 1831, with the Marquess of Anglesey, who commanded the cavalry at the Battle of Waterloo being its first Commodore. John Skipton Mulvany designed the clubhouse, which still retains a number of original architectural features since being opened in 1851.

== History ==
The Royal Irish Yacht Club was founded in 1831 in Kingstown (later renamed Dún Laoghaire), Ireland. In that same year, the club was granted an ensign by the Admiralty of a White Ensign with the Coat of Arms of the Kingdom of Ireland beneath the Union Jack in canton. In the club's constitution, it was unique amongst yacht clubs in that it required yacht owners to provide the club's commodore with information about the coast and any deep sea fisheries they encountered on all of their voyages. In 1846, the club was granted permission to use the Royal prefix by Queen Victoria. The club built a new clubhouse in 1851. Despite the Republic of Ireland breaking away from the United Kingdom, the Royal Irish Yacht Club elected to retain its Royal title.

In 1848, a yachting trophy called "Her Majesty's Plate" was established by Queen Victoria to be contested at Kingstown where the Royal Irish Yacht Club is based. The Lord Lieutenant of Ireland at the time, George Villiers, 4th Earl of Clarendon suggested it should be contested by the Royal Irish Yacht Club and the Royal St. George Yacht Club in an annual regatta, a suggestion that was approved by both clubs with the Royal St. George hosting the first competitive regatta.

== Ensign ==
Original ensign of the RIYC

The club's original British White Ensign was granted by royal warrant in 1831. Though the Royal Irish Yacht Club later changed the ensign to remove the St George's Cross and replace the Union Jack with the flag of the Republic of Ireland in canton, the original ensign may still be used by British members of the Royal Irish Yacht Club.

== Notable former members ==
- First Duke of Wellington (elected 1833)
- Daniel O'Connell (elected 1846)
- Admiral Sir Charles Napier (elected 1848)
- Sir Thomas Lipton (elected 1906)
- Conor O'Brien (elected 1923)

== See also ==
- National Yacht Club
- Royal Cork Yacht Club
- Royal St. George Yacht Club
- Blessington Sailing Club
