= Kinsale Yacht Club =

Yacht club

Coordinates: 51°42′05″N 08°31′09″W

- Burgee

- Ensign
- Short name: KYC
- Founded: 1953
- Location: Kinsale, County Cork, Ireland
- Website: https://www.kyc.ie/

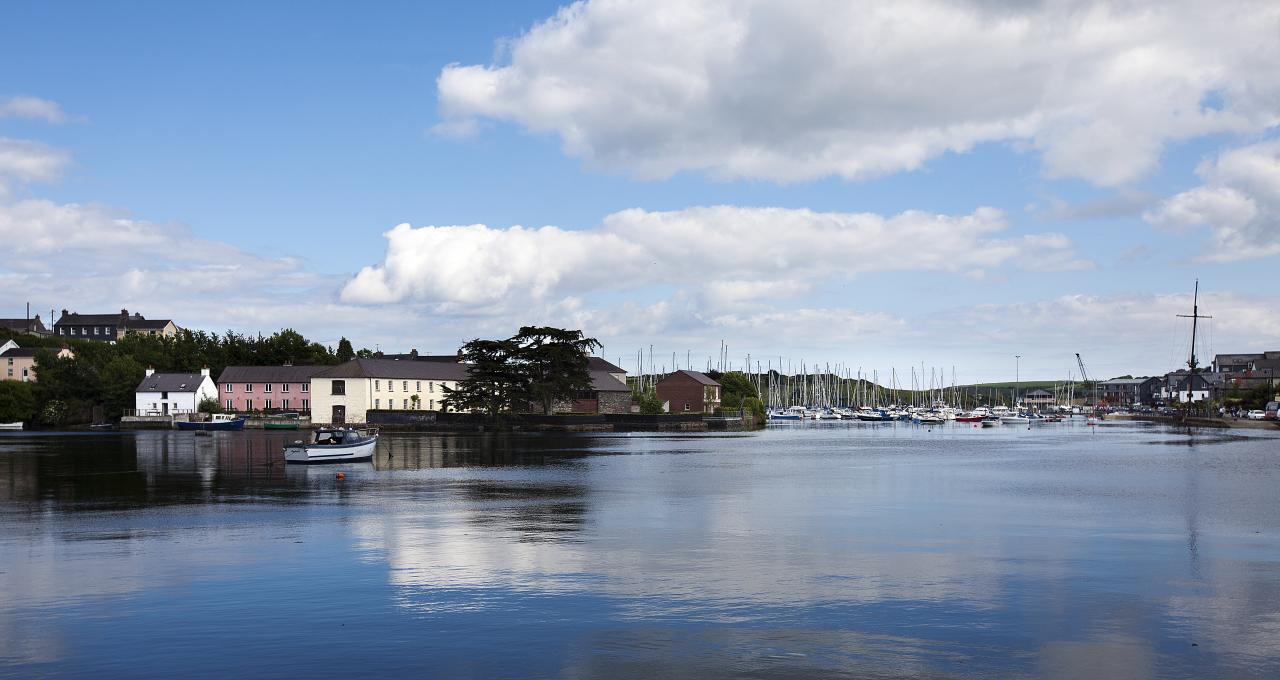
Kinsale

The Kinsale Yacht Club was founded in 1953. It is located in Kinsale in County Cork, Ireland. It is 30 km by road from Cork, Ireland's second city.

== Development ==
The club was initially located in Scilly in a pair of cottages. The club races started off the pier and rarely left the harbour. In the 1960s, a new premises at the end of the pier road was purchased and developed over time into the building seen today.

By the time the club had moved to its current location, the fleet included Albacores, Mirrors, Flying Fifteens, Dragons, Fireballs and Enterprises. The club began to develop junior sailing instruction.

In the 1990s, the junior fleet extended to Optimists, Lasers and 420s. The senior fleet still includes; Dragons and Squibs. There are also three Cruiser Classes and a white sail fleet.

Notable sailors from the club include John Twomey, 11-time Paralympian including 3 medals won in athletic disciplines. Paul McCarthy is another Paralympian from the club. Ron Holland, international yacht designer was also a member at the club.

== Marina ==
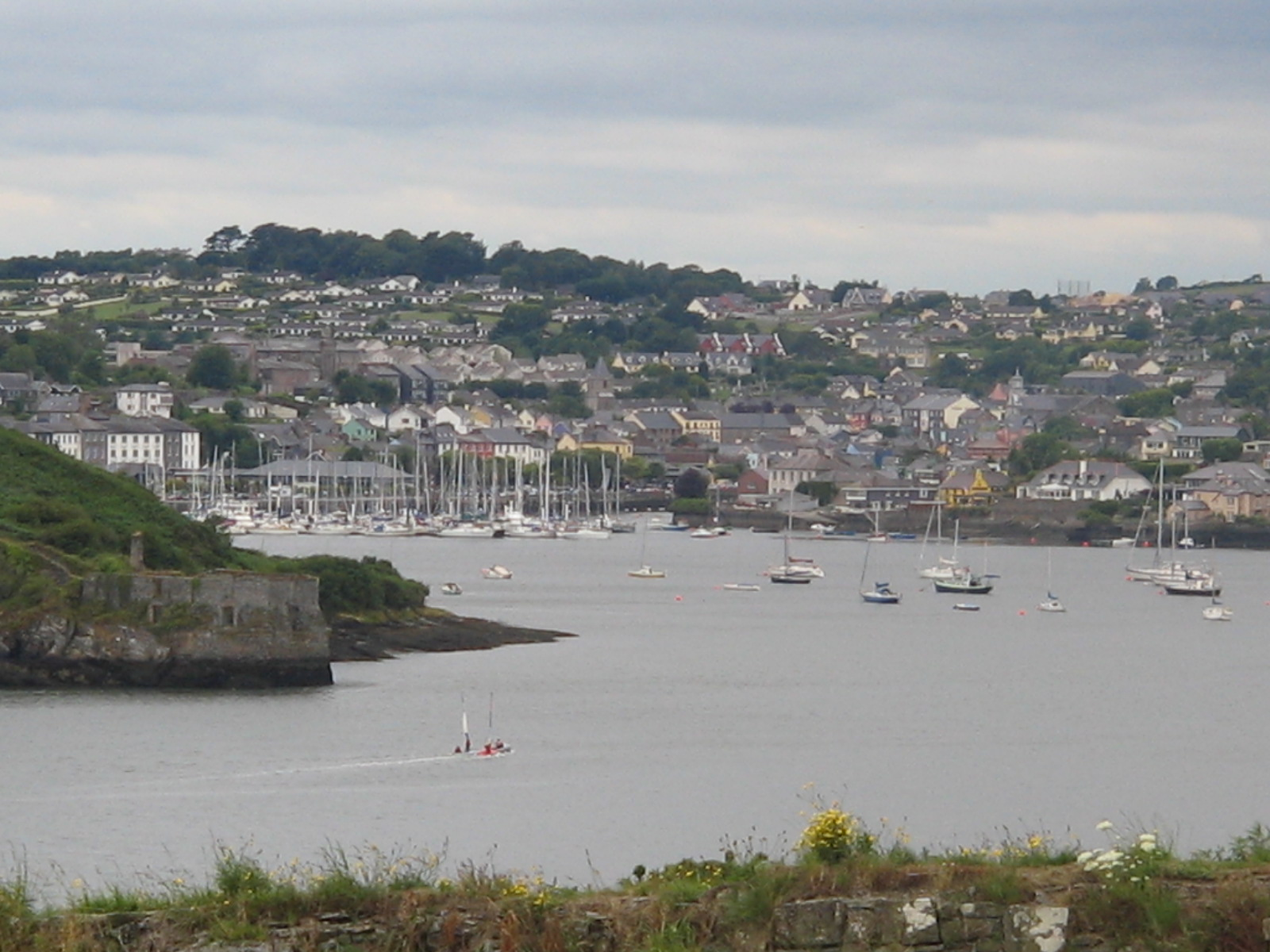
Kinsale-marina

The yacht club's marina is a 200 berth marina which provides "secure and safe berthing within the virtually landlocked harbour" on the estuary of the River Bandon. The marina can cater for "superyachts" of various sizes up to 65 meters in length and is 8 Meters deep at LWS.

The marina holds a Fáilte Ireland Quality Assured Standard, 5-Gold Anchor award and An Taisce Blue Flag.

== Kinsale Yacht Club Championships ==
The club started hosting Regional and National Championships from the 1970s. The club now hosts many regional, national, and international sailing events.

- 1977 World Fireball Championships
- 1977 Dragon Gold Cup
- 1984 Flying Fifteen World Championship
- 1998 Mirror European Championships
- 2008 Flying Fifteen European Championships
- 2012 Dragon Gold Cup
- 2012 Optimist National Championships
- 2013 IFDS Disabled Sailing World Championships
- 2015 Sovereign's Cup (incl. 4 national championships)
- 2017 1/2 Ton Classic Cup
- The Solitaire du Figaro stopped in Kinsale (Kinsale Yacht Club) as host town (stage stopover) on 19 occasions: 1974-1975-1976-1978-1979-1980-1983-1984-1985-1986-1988-1990-1991-1992-1993-1994-1995-1997 and 2010
- 2021 Dragon National Championships
- 2022 Squib (UK) Nationals
- 2024 Planned; Dragon Gold Cup

== Kinsale Regatta ==
Kinsale regatta festival takes place every year over the August Bank holiday weekend. It includes both traditional sailing competitions as well as a variety of water sports. These all take place in and around Kinsale harbour. There are also land activities from sports to the emigrants return.

== See also ==
- List of marinas
