= 2001 Flying Fifteen World Championship =

19th 29er World Championship

Event title
- Name: 2001 Flying Fifteen World Championship
- Edition: 11th
- Host: Royal Natal Yacht Club, Durban, South Africa

Event details
- Venue: Royal Natal Yacht Club
- Dates: 5 - 6 May 2001

Competitors
- Competitors: 102
- Competing nations: 6

Results
- (gold) Gold: Charles Apthorp; Andy Weatherspoon
- (silver) Silver: Steve Goacher; Phil Evans
- (bronze) Bronze: Mike Hart; Chris Gowers

The 2001 Flying Fifteen World Championship took place at Royal Natal Yacht Club in Durban, South Africa. The event saw both a regular and classic fleets with the latter being for an older design on the boat. It was the 11th Flying Fifteen World Championship as well as the first, and to date only, one to take place in Africa.

== Results ==
Classic results shown in brackets and sailors in italics.

| Rank | Nation | Crew | Fleet | Race | | | | | | | Net Points |
| Rank | Nation | Crew | Fleet | 1 | 2 | 3 | 4 | 5 | 6 | 7 | Net Points |
|---|---|---|---|---|---|---|---|---|---|---|---|
| 1st place, gold medalist(s) | United Kingdom | Charles Apthorp Andy Weatherspoon | Open | RDG | (18) | 5.7 | 5.7 | 5.7 | 10 | 3 | 30.1 |
| 2nd place, silver medalist(s) | United Kingdom | Steve Goacher Phil Evans | Open | (OCS) | 15 | 3 | 0 | 0 | 0 | 18 | 36 |
| 3rd place, bronze medalist(s) | United Kingdom | Mike Hart Chris Gowers | Open | (OCS) | 5.7 | 0 | 11.7 | 8 | 3 | 8 | 36.4 |
| 4 | Australia | Grant Alderson Dean McAullay | Open | (14) | 0 | 11.7 | 10 | 11.7 | 8 | 11.7 | 53.1 |
| 5 | Australia | Ronald Packer Peter Mudford | Open | 18 | (46) | 10 | 15 | 14 | 5.7 | 0 | 62.7 |
| 6 | United Kingdom | Alan Bax Bill Masterman | Open | 11.7 | 17 | 16 | 8 | 10 | (18) | 16 | 78.7 |
| 7 | Australia | Peter Gale Chris Mason | Open | (OCS) | 29 | 8 | 3 | 17 | 14 | 14 | 85 |
| 8 | United Kingdom | Barry Parkin Sue Parkin | Open | 0 | 10 | 24 | (27) | 20 | 17 | 17 | 88 |
| 9 | New Zealand | Aaron Goodmanson Allister Rowlands | Open | 20 | 11.7 | 19 | 21 | (22) | 11.7 | 5.7 | 89.1 |
| 10 | South Africa | Patrick Harris Joe Boy | Open | 3 | 21 | 21 | 22 | 3 | 22 | (27) | 92 |
| 11 | Ireland | Darren Martin Simon Murray | Open | 15 | 24 | 13 | (29) | 15 | 26 | 10 | 103 |
| 12 | United Kingdom | Geoff Bayliss Tom Bayliss | Open | 5.7 | 8 | 20 | 23 | 30 | 25 | (34) | 111.7 |
| 13 | Ireland | John Lavery David O'Brien | Open | 24 | 30 | 17 | (33) | 18 | 13 | 13 | 115 |
| 14 | United Kingdom | Brett Dingwall Ben Dingwall | Open | 10 | 31 | 14 | 25 | 25 | (27) | 19 | 120 |
| 15 | United Kingdom | Howard Green Ian Preston | Open | (41) | 25 | 15 | 13 | 13 | 33 | 25 | 124 |
| 16 | New Zealand | Peter Dallimore Richard Watkins | Open | 22 | 3 | 36 | 19 | (DNF) | 23 | 22 | 125 |
| 17 | Australia | Greg Leaversuch Peter Barblett | Open | 19 | 22 | 18 | 24 | (34) | 24 | 24 | 131 |
| 18 | United Kingdom | Neville Herbert Tim Hammick | Open | (OCS) 39 | 39 | 35 | 17 | 16 | 15 | 15 | 137 |
| 19 | United Kingdom | Chris Ducker Richard Rigg | Open | 21 | 23 | 23 | (35) | 26 | 29 | 21 | 143 |
| 20 | United Kingdom | Roger Palmer Barbara Palmer | Open | 16 | 20 | 22 | 18 | 32 | 35 | (DNF) | 143 |
| 21 | Australia | Craig Rainey Ian Rainey | Open | 17 | 16 | (34) | 31 | 28 | 30 | 23 | 145 |
| 22 | Australia | Nils Blumann Thomas Brown | Open | 24 | -49 | 25 | 37 | 23 | 19 | 20 | 148 |
| 23 | Ireland | Justin Burke Alan Greene | Open | 23 | -33 | 27 | 26 | 29 | 21 | 29 | 155 |
| 24 | New Zealand | Rob Coutts Nick Davenport | Open | (OCS) | 14 | 29 | 20 | 19 | 16 | DNF | 156 |
| 25 | Australia | Ashley Smith Jamie Thomson | Open | 28 | 13 | (43) | 34 | 31 | 28 | 26 | 160 |
| 26 | United Kingdom | Colin Nutt Christopher Hough | Open | 26 | (38) | 31 | 30 | 21 | 32 | 30 | 170 |
| 27 | Ireland | Bryan Willis John McPeake | Open | 25 | 28 | 38 | 14 | 35 | (39) | 32 | 172 |
| 28 | United Kingdom | Robert Hogben Glyn Morgan | Open | (OCS) | 36 | 30 | 28 | 37 | 20 | 28 | 179 |
| 29 | United Kingdom | Nicholas Heath Graham Wadely | Open | 27 | 35 | 28 | (40) | 27 | 38 | 31 | 186 |
| 30 | Hong Kong | Howard Williams Christian Donagh | Open | 13 | 19 | 41 | (OCS) | 41 | 40 | 38 | 192 |
| 31 | United Kingdom | Ian Cleaver Simon Russell | Open | 33 | 44 | 33 | 16 | 33 | (DNF) | 33 | 192 |
| 32 | New Zealand | Richard Ingham Mark Puddick | Open | 29 | 34 | 32 | 38 | 24 | 37 | (DNF) | 194 |
| 33 | United Kingdom | David Nicholls Peter Wareham | Open | 31 | 26 | 40 | (43) | 40 | 31 | 35 | 203 |
| 34 | United Kingdom | Paul Brown Oliver Dingwall | Open | (OCS) | 27 | 39 | 36 | 36 | 34 | 41 | 213 |
| 35 | Australia | John Wallace Stewart Wallace | Open | 35 | (42) | 26 | 39 | 38 | 36 | 39 | 213 |
| 36 | Ireland | Ken Dumpleton Ben Mulligan | Open | 34 | 40 | (DNS) | 32 | 39 | 42 | 36 | 223 |
| 37 | Hong Kong | Samuel Chan Benjamin Ford | Open | 32 | 32 | 42 | (47) | 42 | 41 | 37 | 226 |
| 38 ( (gold) ) | South Africa | Peter Morgenrood Jeremy Kriek | Classic | 40 | (56) | 37 | 41 | 44 | 43 | 43 | 248 |
| 39 ( (silver) ) | South Africa | Derick Warne Darryn Hinett | Classic | 39 | 47 | 45 | 45 | 43 | (DSQ) | 40 | 259 |
| 40 | Hong Kong | David Chow Mark Lyons | Open | 37 | 39 | 44 | 42 | (DNF) | DNC | 42 | 262 |
| 41 ( (bronze) ) | South Africa | Neil Tocknel Russel Thornton | Classic | 36 | 41 | (DNF) | 46 | 46 | 47 | DNF | 274 |
| 42 (4) | South Africa | Hemraj Gokal Dennis Lapham | Classic | 44 | 45 | 47 | (53) | 49 | 45 | 47 | 277 |
| 43 | Hong Kong | James Dale Dennis Lapham | Open | 38 | (52) | 48 | 51 | 52 | 46 | 48 | 283 |
| 44 | Hong Kong | David Thewliss Joyce Thewliss | Open | 45 | 43 | 46 | (DNC) | 50 | DNF | 46 | 288 |
| 45 | Hong Kong | Wai Chuen Chen Joyce Thewliss | Open | 43 | 50 | 49 | 54 | 51 | (DNF) | 49 | 296 |
| 46 (5) | United Kingdom | Scott Train Graham Lamond | Classic | 46 | 51 | (DNF) | 50 | 48 | DSQ | 44 | 297 |
| 46 (6) | Australia | John Caig Graham Lamond | Classic | 42 | 53 | (DNF) | 52 | 47 | DNF | 45 | 297 |
| 48 (7) | South Africa | Terry Flynn Graham Lamond | Classic | (DNF) | 55 | DNF | 48 | 45 | 44 | DNC | 308 |
| 49 | United Kingdom | James Coates Graham Lamond | Open | (DSQ) | 48 | DNC | 44 | DNC | DNC | DNC | 324 |
| 50 (8) | South Africa | Derek Wilkes Graham Lamond | Classic | (DNF) | 54 | DNF | 49 | DNC | DNC | DNC | 335 |
| 51 (9) | Swaziland | Percy Elston Graham Lamond | Classic | 47 | (DNF) | DNF | DNC | DNF | DNC | DNC | 337 |
