= 2025 Flying Fifteen World Championship =

22nd Flying Fifteen World Championship

Event title
- Name: 2025 Flying Fifteen World Championship
- Edition: 22nd
- Sponsor: Ovington Boats; PRO-SET Epoxy
- Host: Weymouth and Portland National Sailing Academy, Weymouth and the Isle of Portland, Great Britain

Event details
- Venue: Weymouth and Portland National Sailing Academy
- Dates: 16 - 21 August 2025

Competitors
- Competitors: 162
- Competing nations: 9

Results
- (gold) Gold: Graham Vials; Chris Turner
- (silver) Silver: Andrew Mckee; Richard Jones
- (bronze) Bronze: Ben McGrane; Russ Clark

The 2025 Flying Fifteen World Championship took place at Weymouth and Portland National Sailing Academy on the Isle of Portland, Great Britain, and took place between August 10 and 21 2025. The event saw 162 competitors from 9 nations competing and was the 22nd Flying Fifteen World Championship.

Graham Vials and Chris Turner won their sixth world championship.

== Results ==
Rank	Nation	Crew	Race										Net Points
Rank	Nation	Crew	1	2	3	4	5	6	7	8	9	10	Net Points
1	United Kingdom	Graham Vials Chris Turner	1	1	(5)	1	2	(6)	1	1	1	19	8
2	United Kingdom	Andrew Mckee Richard Jones	3	5	2	2	(18)	1	(7)	2	6	46	21
3	United Kingdom	Ben McGrane Russ Clark	6	2	1	3	3	(13)	6	(9)	7	50	28
4	United Kingdom	Jeremy Davy Martin Huett	2	6	3	(9)	4	2	5	8	(16)	55	30
5	United Kingdom	Hamish Mackay Andrew Lawson	7	(9)	4	4	7	9	3	(20)	2	65	36
6	Australia	Nick Jerwood Greg Tonnison	(BFD)	13	7	5	(27)	3	2	4	4	148	38
7	United Kingdom	Russell Peters Zeb Elliott	8	17	12	11	1	(34)	(23)	10	5	121	64
8	United Kingdom	Richard Whitworth Ben Scroogle	10	7	(23)	(19)	6	11	4	18	9	107	65
9	United Kingdom	Ian Pinnell Ian Cadwallader	4	3	13	6	(21)	14	(17)	14	13	105	67
10	United Kingdom	Andrew Jameson Matt Alvarado	9	RDGa1-8 [20.3]	11	17	9	8	(32)	(56)	8	170.3	82.3
11	United Kingdom	Andrew Tunnicliffe Richard Rigg	15	10	19	8	(35)	15	(20)	16	3	141	86
12	United Kingdom	Greg Wells David Tulloch	13	4	22	15	15	5	(31)	(24)	14	143	88
13	United Kingdom	Ben Cooper Richard Bundock	17	11	16	12	13	(21)	18	17	(19)	144	104
14	United Kingdom	Chris Waples Simon Weatherill	26	12	14	7	(44)	7	(DNS)	5	37	235	108
15	Spain	James Waugh Oskar Tullberg	21	20	10	14	10	(24)	14	22	(25)	160	111
16	United Kingdom	David Mckee Mal Hartland	(42)	24	33	18	8	4	13	(34)	15	191	115
17	United Kingdom	Charles Apthorp Charlie Apthorp	5	8	17	13	12	10	(BFD)	52	(55)	255	117
18	United Kingdom	Mike Hart Simon Childs	19	16	6	10	26	12	28	(38)	(44)	199	117
19	Australia	Lewis Davies John Radnell	34	27	9	16	(TLE [74])	31	(43)	3	18	255	138
20	Ireland	Peter Kennedy Stephen Kane	30	18	8	(32)	(66)	25	9	31	20	239	141
21	Ireland	Dermot Flaherty Brendan Mcdonagh	32	19	25	24	14	(38)	(44)	27	10	233	151
22	Ireland	Sally Garrett Neil Easton	24	31	(35)	22	16	17	10	(60)	34	249	154
23	United Kingdom	Keith Byers Jim Hunt	18	(RET)	18	23	23	36	16	21	(53)	291	155
24	Australia	Michael Dunbar Paul Dunbar	11	14	20	20	41	18	35	(44)	(58)	261	159
25	United Kingdom	Dave Lucas Harry Lucas	12	21	30	34	24	(47)	(40)	28	12	248	161
26	South Africa	Campbell Alexander Ralph Thomas	14	15	(47)	21	43	20	11	(46)	39	256	163
27	Ireland	Trevor Darcy Alan Mcclernon	23	22	21	(36)	(51)	22	15	35	26	251	164
28	Ireland	Niall O'Brien Ronan O'Briain	29	29	15	35	29	23	8	(41)	(50)	259	168
29	United Kingdom	Pete Allam Jo Allam	(46)	35	36	(45)	5	19	22	37	23	268	177
30	Hong Kong	Lijia Xu Cameron Tweedle	27	(DNC)	32	28	(47)	16	38	12	24	307	177
31	United Kingdom	Alastair Stevenson David Culpan	16	(DNC)	31	30	19	27	24	(48)	36	314	183
32	United Kingdom	James Yearsley John Costard	(39)	28	24	25	25	(35)	27	33	21	257	183
33	Australia	Greg Leaversuch Peter Barblett	20	(53)	46	29	17	32	21	23	(49)	290	188
34	Ireland	Philip Lawton Neil O'Hagan	41	25	27	39	(49)	33	26	7	(69)	316	198
35	United Kingdom	Mark Nicholson Steve Culpitt	(BFD)	33	26	31	22	44	36	11	(66)	352	203
36	Australia	Dale Collings Edward Brewis	36	26	41	33	11	(56)	25	(58)	41	327	213
37	Hong Kong	Leigh Riddell Gina Chen	(47)	(45)	45	41	20	43	19	39	11	310	218
38	United Kingdom	William Chard Josh Preater	(52)	32	29	26	36	29	(54)	30	42	330	224
39	United Kingdom	Justin Waples Jackie Mckellar	22	30	37	47	42	48	12	(RET)	(63)	384	238
40	United Kingdom	Neville Herbert Mark Fowler	33	(44)	39	40	32	42	(52)	25	29	336	240
41	Spain	Josh Banks Ollie Jenkins	31	41	28	27	30	37	(DSQ )	(RET)	47	407	241
42	United Kingdom	Brett Dingwall Ben Dingwall	43	(52)	(57)	51	37	49	34	6	30	359	250
43	United Kingdom	Simon Kneller Ashley Painter	45	37	40	37	31	50	(59)	13	(72)	384	253
44	United Kingdom	John Hanson Helen Selden	37	36	38	50	50	30	(55)	29	(57)	382	270
45	Australia	Peter Groom Phil Epps	35	47	(55)	46	(57)	54	47	19	28	388	276
46	Ireland	Andrew Mccleery Colin Dougan	(BFD)	34	43	43	38	(53)	45	26	51	416	280
47	Australia	Philippa Packer Dean Mcaullay	44	(51)	50	49	34	40	29	(54)	40	391	286
48	United Kingdom	Paul Busby Neil Barford	(BFD)	43	34	44	(62)	52	37	47	32	434	289
49	United Kingdom	Rob Goddard Jack Muldoon	25	39	48	55	55	46	(69)	(69)	27	433	295
50	United Kingdom	Adrian Tattersall John Mathie	38	23	52	(65)	53	57	41	(DSQ )	33	445	297
51	United Kingdom	Jeremy Arnold Richard Hope	28	46	(56)	(54)	54	28	48	42	54	410	300
52	United Kingdom	Simon Patterson Simon Thompson	(DNS)	40	51	42	45	(75)	42	15	74	467	309
53	United Kingdom	Geof Gibbons Nick Gibbons	54	38	(RET)	(DNC)	58	41	46	64	17	484	318
54	New Zealand	Sarah Reynolds Peter Macartney	49	49	53	58	33	45	33	(62)	(65)	447	320
55	United Kingdom	Mervyn Wright Ralph Singleton	(RET)	(DNC)	59	38	56	39	63	32	35	488	322
56	United Kingdom	Lily Grimshaw Rob Darby	48	48	44	48	40	(62)	(62)	36	60	448	324
57	United Kingdom	Anthony Woods Keith Jamieson	53	50	61	(62)	(69)	26	30	57	52	460	329
58	Ireland	Alan Green Caroline Hanniffy	55	42	(RET)	(56)	39	55	39	49	56	474	335
59	United Kingdom	Julian Clarke Nick Hampson	60	59	42	53	61	(63)	53	(72)	38	501	366
60	Hong Kong	Carlyon Knight-Evans Howard Williams	58	57	(66)	60	46	(68)	58	66	22	501	367
61	United Kingdom	Gary Stuart John Wayling	40	(DNS)	68	52	64	(69)	51	51	43	521	369
62	United Kingdom	Andrew Currell Andrew Clark	62	(65)	63	(64)	48	60	49	63	48	522	393
63	Australia	Gary Richardson Ian Rainey	51	63	70	(DNS)	59	70	(BFD)	53	31	563	397
64	United Kingdom	David Chandler David Clarke	(RET)	(DNC)	49	RET	28	66	57	40	DNC	572	406
65	United Kingdom	Charles Mckee Simon Montague	50	60	64	59	65	65	(67)	43	(71)	544	406
66	Australia	Mark Millman Nigel Moffat	57	55	54	(66)	63	(74)	60	61	61	551	411
67	United Kingdom	Matthew Thompson Raymond Flanagan	61	54	62	57	(TLE [74])	(71)	65	70	45	559	414
68	Ireland	Niall Meagher Hugh Meagher	64	56	60	63	52	61	64	(65)	(70)	555	420
69	Ireland	Emma Pierce Ian Smyth	59	61	(DNC)	(DNC)	68	72	61	55	46	588	422
70	New Zealand	Jenny Price Alana Pooley	66	58	65	61	(70)	58	56	(68)	62	564	426
71	United Kingdom	John Thornley Megan Thornley	(67)	66	67	(68)	67	51	66	45	67	564	429
72	United Kingdom	Andrew Millband Tony Hastings	63	68	(DNC)	(DNC)	60	64	50	50	77	598	432
73	United Kingdom	John Tuckwell Graham Tuckwell	56	62	(DNC)	(DNC)	ZFP	67	73	59	59	625	459
74	France	Michel Pelegrin D'Almeida Erwan Gouriou	65	(DNC)	58	67	TLE [74]	59	70	75	(78)	629	468
75	United Kingdom	Bob Johnston Alan Freeman	69	67	69	69	71	(79)	72	(76)	68	640	485
76	Hong Kong	Sam Chan Nick Atkinson	68	64	71	70	72	(77)	74	67	(75)	638	486
77	United Kingdom	Jordan Aspin Jason Benn	70	69	(DNC)	(DNC)	TLE [74]	76	71	73	64	663	497
78	New Zealand	David Mcintyre Jillian Oakes	71	(RET)	(RET)	DNS	TLE [74]	78	75	71	73	691	525
79	United Kingdom	Michael Scholes Tim Cobb	(RET)	70	(DNC)	DNC	TLE [74]	80	76	77	79	705	539
80	United Kingdom	Graham Latham Sara Briscoe	(DNC)	(DNC)	DNC	DNC	TLE [74]	DNC	68	74	76	707	541
81	Hong Kong	Tim Roberts Edith Fernandez	(DNC)	(DNC)	DNC	DNC	TLE [74]	73	DNC	DNS	DNC	728	562
82	United Kingdom	James Fawcett Dave Bosnia	(DNC)	(DNC)	DNC	DNC	DNC	DNC	DNC	DNC	DNC	747	581
