= Anja Käser =

Swiss windsurfer

Personal information
- Born: Anja Schocher-Käser; November 4, 1979 (age 46) Davos, Switzerland
- Height: 172 cm (5 ft 8 in)
- Weight: 60 kg (132 lb)

Sport
- Sport: Windsurfing

Anja Schocher-Käser (born 4 November 1979) is a Swiss former windsurfer who competed in the 2000 Summer Olympics in Sydney #12 and in the 2004 Summer Olympics in Athens #14 .

== Life and career ==
Anja Käser was born on November 4, 1979, in Davos, Switzerland. She competed in the 2000 Summer Olympics in Sydney and got 12th place. Then, she competed in the 2004 Summer Olympics in Athens and got 14th place.
