= Andrew Ball (sailor) =

New Zealand sailor

Andrew Ball is a New Zealand sailor. He won a silver medal at the 1994 World Championships in sailing (keelboat classes).
