= National Yacht Club =

Irish yacht club

- Burgee

- Ensign
- Short name: NYC
- Founded: 1871
- Location: Dún Laoghaire, County Dublin
- Website: http://www.nyc.ie

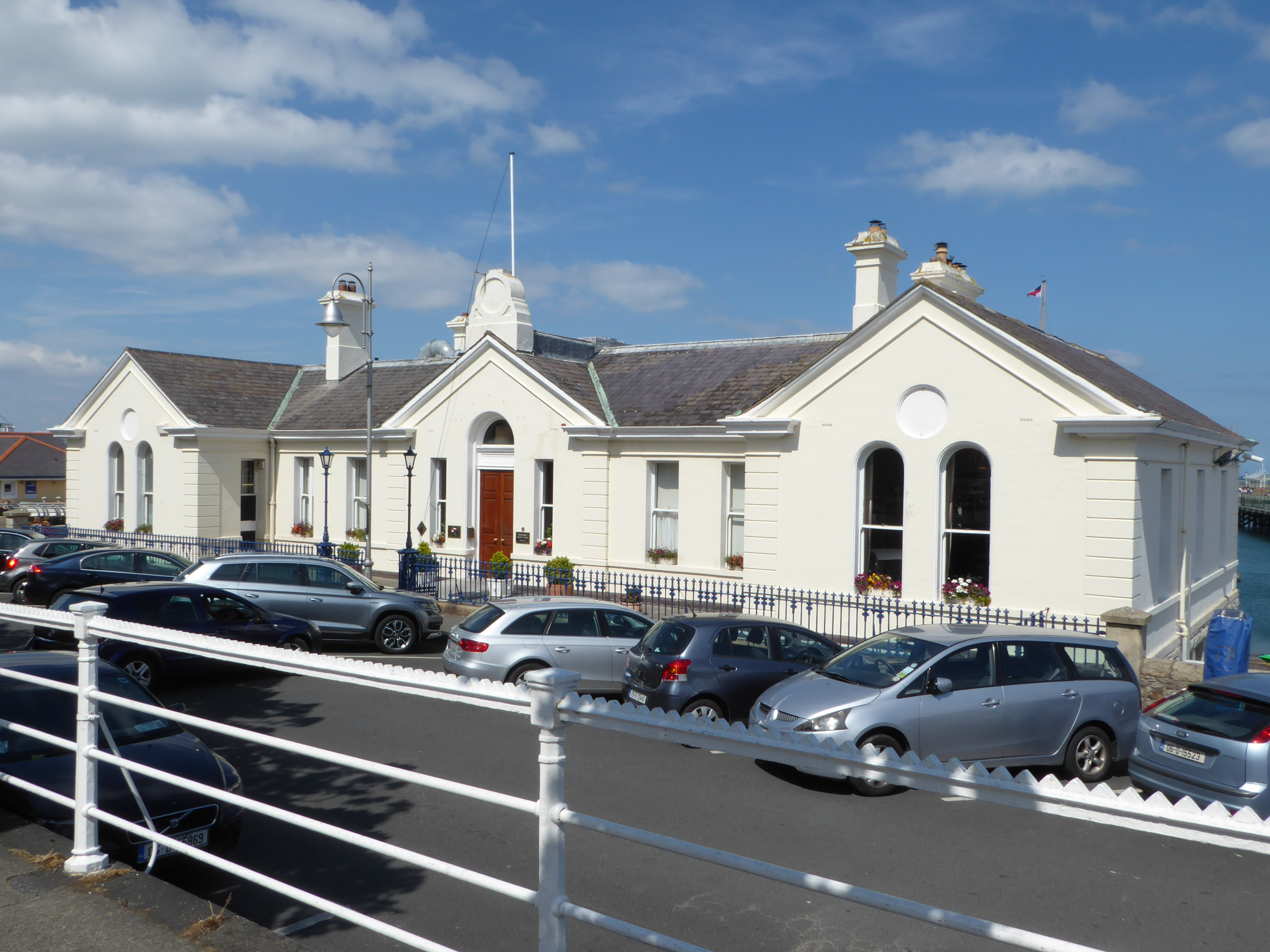
National Yacht Club in 2018

The National Yacht Club is a yacht club located in Dún Laoghaire, County Dublin, Ireland.

The club was founded in 1871 as the Kingstown Royal Harbour Boat Club

An active club prior to 1870 operated on the site. It is likely that it was a commercial venture loosely described as a club rather than a club as known today.

== 1871 Kingstown Royal Harbour Boat Club ==
The present clubhouse, designed by William Sterling, was erected in 1870 at a cost of £4,000. At that time it was known as the Kingstown Royal Harbour Boat Club.

== 1872 Kingston Harbour Boat Club ==
In 1872 the name was changed to the Kingston Harbour Boat Club, as the use of the word Royal in a title requires a royal warrant and that was registered with Lloyd's in 1872.

== 1881 Kingstown Harbour Yacht Club ==
Ownership passed to a Captain Peacocke and others who formed a proprietary club called the Kingstown Harbour Yacht Club, again registered at Lloyds. In 1887 the clubhouse was bought by a Mr Charles Barrington. and between 1887 and 1901 the club was very active and operated for a while as the Absolute Club although this change of name was never registered.

== 1901 Edward Yacht Club ==
The name changed yet again to the Edward Yacht Club, following its purchase by three trustees.

== 1931 National Yacht Club ==
Former ensign of the NYC, used before 1945.

In 1930 at a time when the Edward Yacht Club was relatively inactive, a committee including the Earl of Granard approached the trustees with a proposition to form the National Yacht Club. The Earl of Granard had been Commodore of the North Shannon Yacht Club. An agreement was reached, the National Yacht Club was registered at Lloyds, and the Earl of Granard became the first Commodore.

It obtained a warrant from the Irish Herald of Arms and is the only yacht club in Ireland with a warrant to use the State Harp on its Ensign.

It continues to provide yachting facilities today.

Other yacht clubs in Dún Laoghaire are the Royal Irish Yacht Club founded in 1831, the Royal St. George Yacht Club founded in 1838 and the Dunlaoghaire Motor Yacht Club founded in 1965.

== See also ==
- Boating
- Sailing
- Dinghy sailing
- Yacht racing
- Dinghy racing
- Cruising (maritime)
