= Royal Natal Yacht Club =

South African yacht club

Coordinates: 29°23′41″S 30°58′33″E

- Burgee
- Founded: 1858
- Location: Durban, South Africa
- Website: https://rnyc.org.za/

The Royal Natal Yacht Club is located in Durban, South Africa, and was established in 1858. It is the oldest yacht club in Africa and in the southern hemisphere.

== See also ==
- List of yacht clubs
