= Royal Queensland Yacht Squadron =

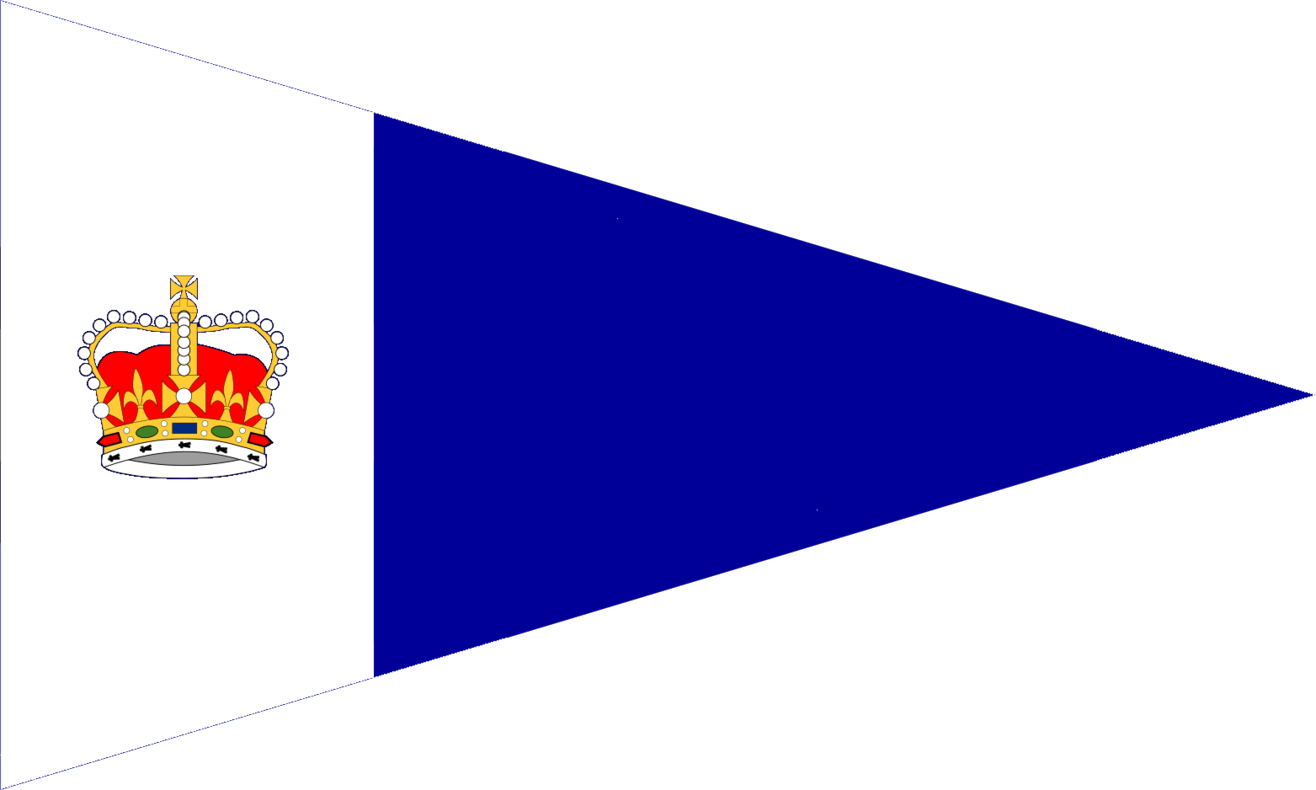
- Burgee

- Ensign
- Short name: RQYS
- Founded: 1885
- Location: Manly, Queensland, Australia
- Website: www.rqys.com.au

The Royal Queensland Yacht Squadron is a Squadron (not a club which is reflected in its support for all things sailing) in Brisbane, Queensland, Australia. It was founded in 1885 and started using its Royal title in 1961, following a grant of a Royal charter in 1902.

== History ==
The Queensland Yacht Squadron was founded in 1885, received royal charter in 1902, and added Royal to its title in 1961. Its members have competed at the Olympic Games since 1956. In 1970 the club made the news for preventing its female sailors from attending a function hosted by the club and attended by Prince Philip, Duke of Edinburgh. In 2006, the club's registration with Yachting Queensland was controversially suspended for a short period after the club failed to forward the required $110,000 of members' affiliation fees to the state governing body for sailing, leading to the Squadron's members losing their public liability insurance and resulted in them being banned from competing in competitive sailing events. The oversight was quickly rectified. They run and oversee the Brisbane Regatta.

In 2020, during the COVID-19 pandemic in Australia, the Royal Queensland Yacht Squadron was accused of misappropriating COVID relief funds. It was alleged that the Squadron used government COVID grants to pay off club debt rather than cover their marina tenant's fees. The Squadron denied the allegations. They announced they would begin expulsion proceedings against the accuser, whom subsequently resigned.

== See also ==
- List of International Council of Yacht Clubs members
