= Flying Fifteen =

Sailboat class

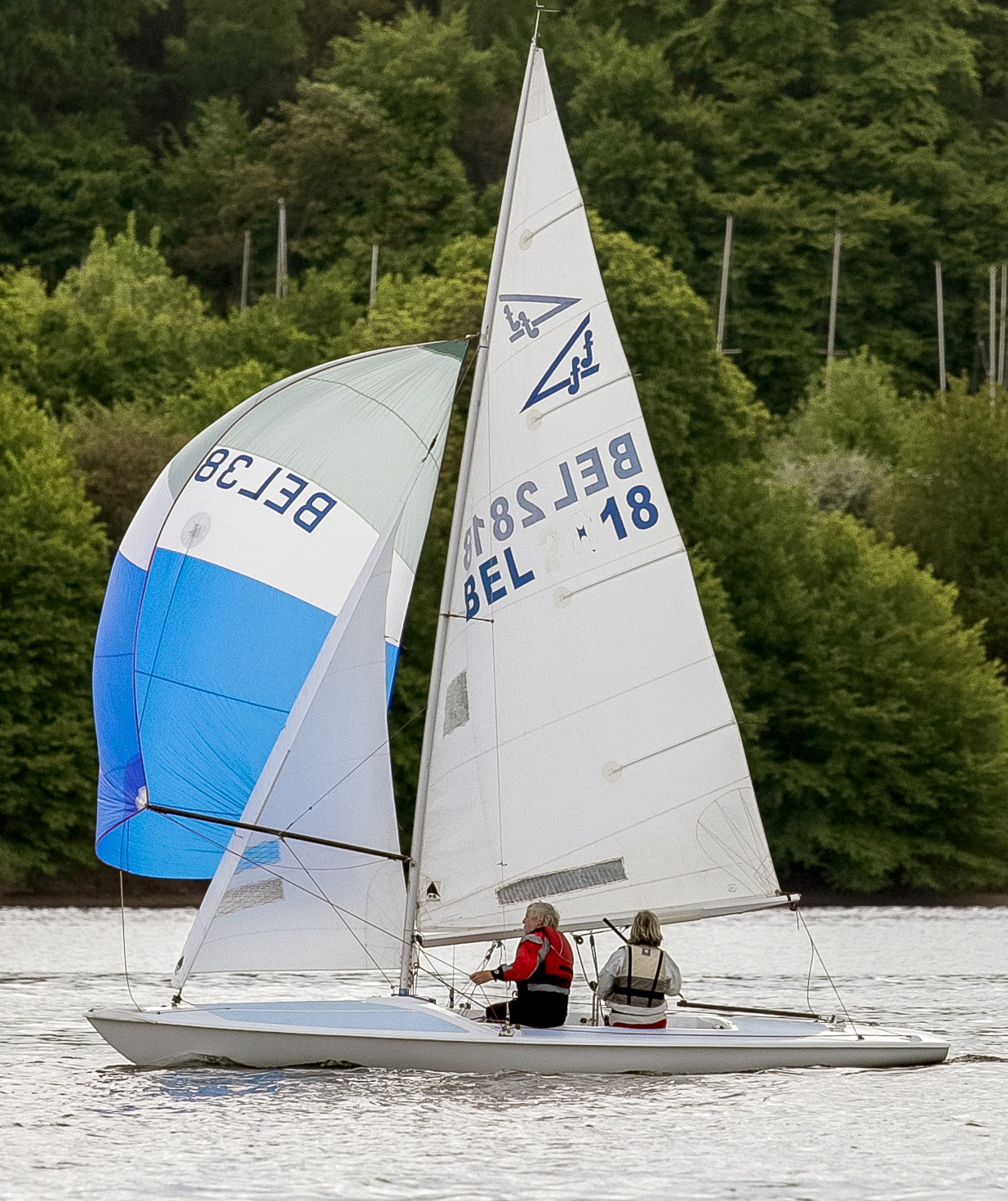

Development
- Designer: Uffa Fox
- Location: United Kingdom
- Year: 1948
- No. built: 4,000
- Builders: Fairey Marine; Halmatic Ltd. Ovington Boats; Rob Legg Yachts; Windrush Yachts; Stebbings & Sons; Copland Boats; Chippendale Boats
- Role: One-design racer
- Name: Flying Fifteen

Boat
- Crew: two
- Displacement: 725 lb (329 kg)
- Draft: 2.50 ft (0.76 m)

Hull
- Type: monohull
- Construction: wood or fibreglass
- LOA: 20.00 ft (6.10 m)
- LWL: 15.00 ft (4.57 m)
- Beam: 5.00 ft (1.52 m)

Hull appendages
- Keel: swept fin keel
- Ballast: 372 lb (169 kg) minimum
- Rudder: internally-mounted spade-type rudder

Rig
- Rig type: Bermuda rig
- I foretriangle height: 15.00 ft (4.57 m)
- J foretriangle base: 5.50 ft (1.68 m)
- P mainsail luff: 20.50 ft (6.25 m)
- E mainsail foot: 9.80 ft (2.99 m)

Sails
- Sailplan: fractional rigged sloop
- Mainsail area: 100.45 sq ft (9.332 m^{2})
- Jib/genoa area: 41.25 sq ft (3.832 m^{2})
- Spinnaker area: 150 sq ft (14 m^{2})
- Total sail area: 141.70 sq ft (13.164 m^{2})

Racing
- D-PN: 91.0

The Flying Fifteen is a British sailboat that was designed by Uffa Fox as a one design racer and first built in 1948.

The design has been a World Sailing international class since March 1981.

== Production ==
In the past the design was built in the United Kingdom by Fairey Marine, Halmatic Ltd., Rob Legg Yachts, Stebbings & Sons, Copland Boats and Chippendale Boats. It remains in production in the UK by Ovington Boats and in Australia by Windrush Yachts. A total of 4,000 boats have been built.

== Design ==
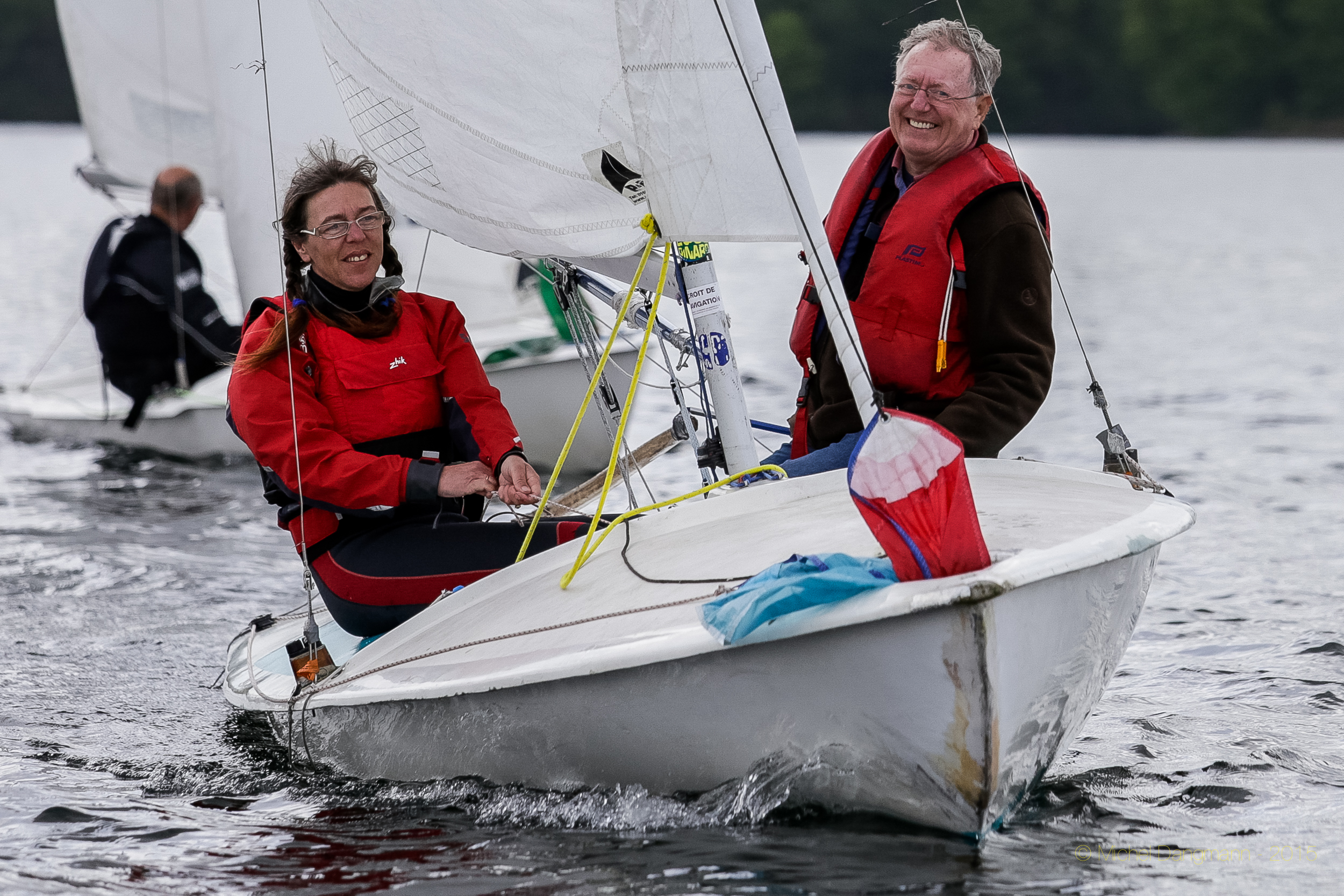
Flying Fifteen

The Flying Fifteen is a racing keelboat, originally built from wood and more recently of fibreglass. It has a fractional sloop rig, a spooned and highly raked stem, a plumb, raised counter transom, an internally mounted spade-type rudder controlled by a tiller with an extension and a swept fixed fin keel. It displaces 725 lb (329 kg) and carries class imposed minimum of 372 lb (169 kg) of ballast.

The boat has a draft of 2.50 ft (0.76 m) with the standard keel.

The boat was accepted as in international class in 1981. The design has changed over time, with modifications to the rig and the hull construction. The hull tolerances were originally set at +/- 1.00 in (25 mm) of the plans. In 1984 the class club reduced the hull tolerances to +/- 0.60 in (15 mm) and introduced the first measurement templates. In 1993 there was a further reduction in tolerances to +/- 0.28 in (7 mm) was introduced, along with additional adjustments to the median plan lines equal to the current design. Older boats built to the previous tolerances are known as "classics" within the class, are grandfathered and still permitted to be raced.

For sailing the design is equipped with a self-bailing cockpit, a Cunningham, boom vang, downhaul, outhaul, a 150 sq ft (14 m^{2}) spinnaker and air bag flotation for safety. The class rules require positive buoyancy and hiking strapss, while prohibiting the use of instruments and mast adjustments on the water. Roller furling for the jib is permitted.

The design has a Portsmouth Yardstick racing average handicap of 91.0 and is raced by a crew of two sailors.

== Operational history ==
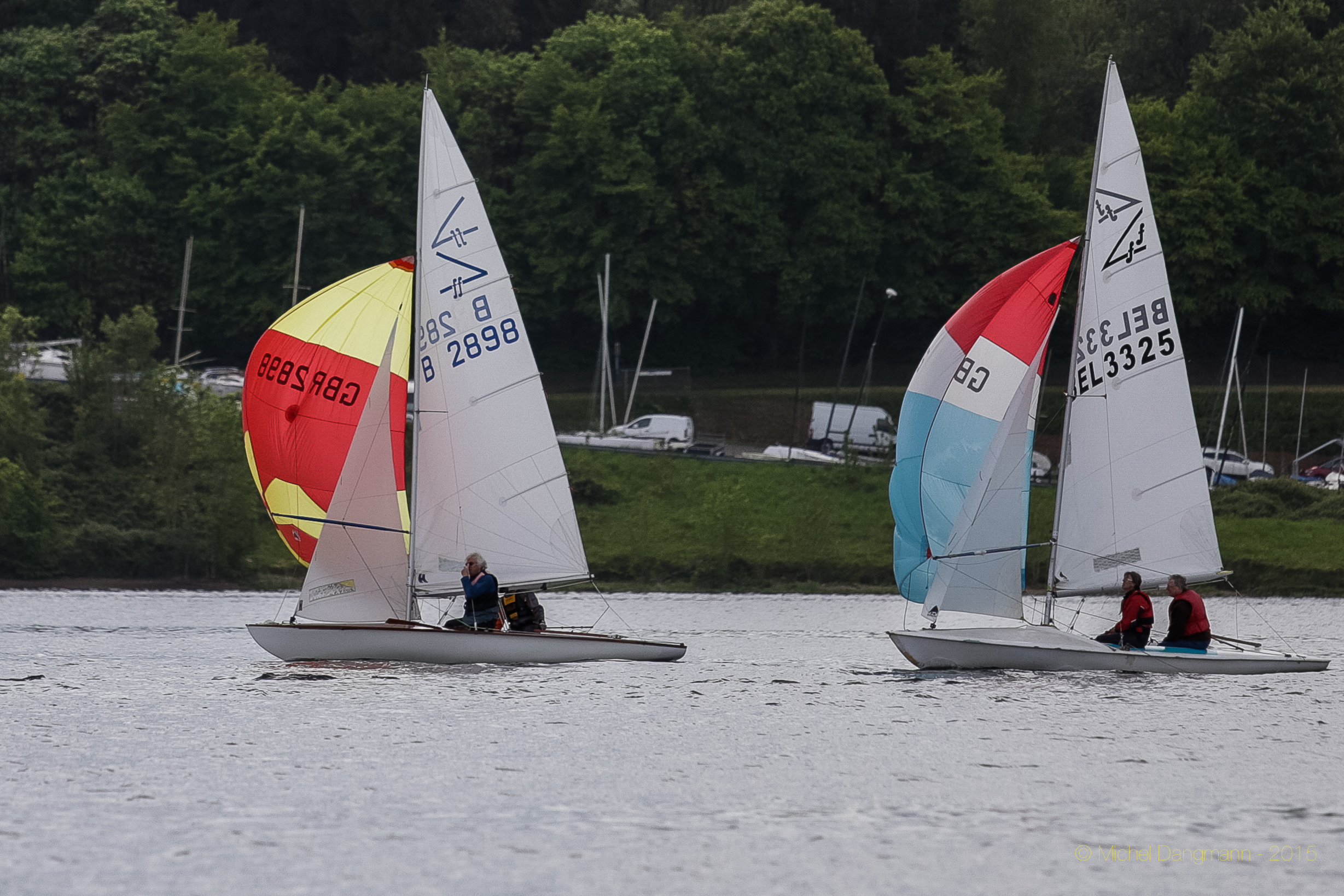
Flying Fifteens racing downwind

The design is supported by a class club that controls the design and organizes racing events, the Flying Fifteen International, with a club in Australia as well, Flying Fifteen International – Australia.

There are racing fleets in Australia, Hong Kong, Ireland, New Zealand, South Africa as well as in Britain and the United States east and west coasts.

In a 1994 review Richard Sherwood wrote, "the Flying Fifteen is an ultra-light-displacement keel boat that has been clocked at 16 knots."

== See also ==
- List of sailing boat types
