= Royal St. George Yacht Club =

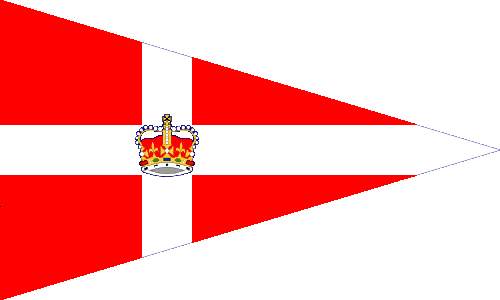
- Burgee

- Ensign
- Nickname: RSGYC
- Founded: 1838
- Location: Dún Laoghaire Harbour, County Dublin
- Website: http://rsgyc.ie

The Royal St. George Yacht Club is a yacht club housed in a Victorian clubhouse, located in Dún Laoghaire, Ireland. Each season the Club hosts a number of national and international sailing events.

It is home to the Dublin University Boat Club of Trinity College, Dublin.

== History ==
After the collapse of the Royal Irish Yacht Club (Clarendon Buildings, Great Brunswick Street, Dublin,) The 'Royal St. George Yacht Club' was founded by members of the Pembroke Rowing Club in 1838. Initially it was known as 'Kingstown Boat Club.' By 1845 royal patronage had been obtained and the club became 'Royal Kingstown Yacht Club.' This patronage permitted members to fly a red ensign with white cross and crown in the centre. In 1847 the club was permitted to change its name to 'Royal St. George Yacht Club.' In 2013 the club celebrated its 175th birthday with a series of historical talks and sailing events.

== Buildings ==
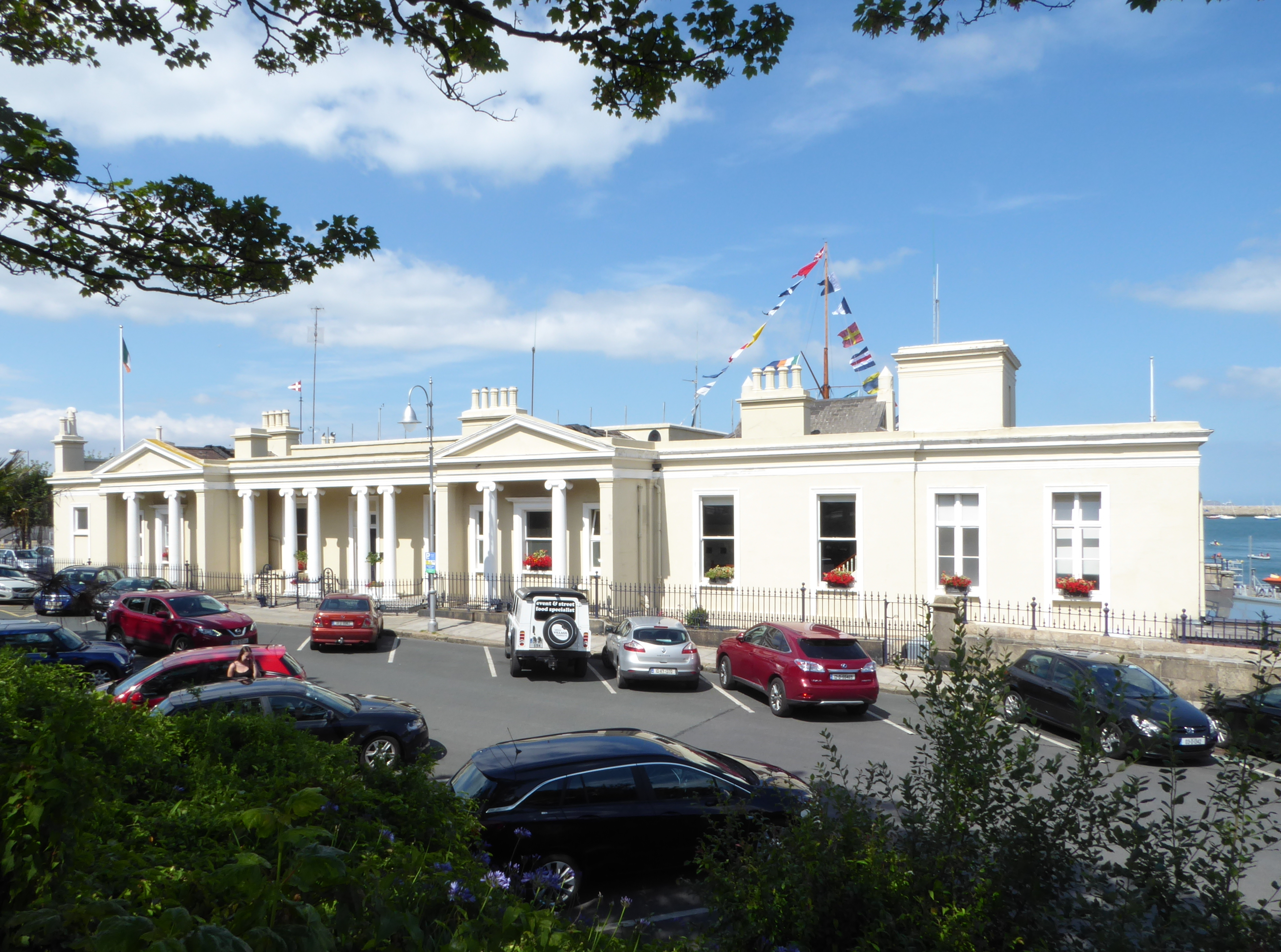
The yacht club in 2018

The committee was not in a position to build a clubhouse until 1841. The clubhouse was designed in 1842 and completed in 1843 adjoining the 'Watering Pier'. It consisted of a single storey building (from the street side) designed by architect John Skipton Mulvany, with a plastered Ionic portico forming a breakfront with two windows on each side. Accommodation at street level consisted of an entrance hall, ballroom, committee room, staircase to the boathouse below and lavatories. A terrace overlooked the harbour. The painted exterior was coloured to look like stone.

In 1843 the Club employed architect George Papworth to extend the clubhouse on the west side. A Mr. Masterson was the builder of the extension, which cost £1,500. Papworth's proposal was unique. He built a new portico exactly matching the one which already existed, and formed a colonnade of paired columns linking the two porticos. The entrance was moved west from the portico to this new colonnade. The extension contained a reading room with a bow front facing the harbour. At this time all of the small paned windows were replaced with plate glass.

In 1866 architect Mr. E.T. Owen was appointed to provide an extension to be used as a smoking room on the east side of the building, at a cost of £1,316.

In 1919 a fire destroyed all but four rooms of the clubhouse. Mr. Bradbury oversaw the rebuilding works and Pemberton & Sons undertook the building works, which cost £2,550. In the 2000s architect Michael Collins provided a copper faced extension on the east side of the clubhouse. It does not extend up to street level and maintains a view of the harbour to those walking past.

== Fleet ==
Currently in 2024 the most popular boats raced in the club include:

- IRC keelboat classes
- One-Design keelboat classes: Dragon (keelboat), Shipman 28s, Ruffians, SB20s, Squibs, J/80
- Dinghy classes: Water Wag, Laser, Melges 15, ILCA, Aero etc.
- Junior Classes: 420, Optimist, Laser

The club has a large group of non-racing cruising yacht types. The club also owns a small fleet of 1720s and J80s. Heritage wooden boats sailed in the club include Glens and Water Wag. The Water Wags are the oldest One-Design dinghy class in the world, having been founded in 1887, but the boats raced in the George are the revised design of 1900.
