= List of Australian organisations with royal patronage =

List of Australian organisations with royal patronage

== Organisations ==
- 1st/15th Royal New South Wales Lancers
- Australasian Institute of Mining and Metallurgy (incorporated by Royal Charter)
- Australian Academy of the Humanities (incorporated by Royal Charter)
- Australian Academy of Science (incorporated by Royal Charter)
- Australian Institute of Building (incorporated by Royal Charter)
- Australian Medical Association
- Australian Racing Museum
- Australian Red Cross Society (incorporated by Royal Charter)
- Chartered Institute of Logistics and Transport in Australia (incorporated by Royal Charter)
- Institute of Chartered Accountants in Australia (incorporated by Royal Charter)
- Institution of Engineers Australia (incorporated by Royal Charter)
- Prince Alfred College
- The University of Sydney
- Royal Adelaide Golf Club
- Royal Adelaide Hospital
- Royal Aero Club of New South Wales
- Royal Aero Club of Western Australia
- Royal Agricultural and Horticultural Society of South Australia (which presents the Royal Adelaide Show and the Royal Adelaide Wine Show)
- Royal Agricultural Society of New South Wales (which presents the Sydney Royal Easter Show)
- Royal Agricultural Society of Queensland (which presents the Royal Toowoomba Show)
- Royal Agricultural Society of Tasmania (which presents the Royal Hobart Show)
- Royal Agricultural Society of the Northern Territory (which presents the Royal Darwin Show and the Alice Springs Royal Show)
- Royal Agricultural Society of Victoria (which presents the Royal Melbourne Show and the Royal Melbourne Wine Show)
- Royal Agricultural Society of Western Australia (which presents the Perth Royal Show)
- Royal Alexandra Hospital for Children (also known as Children's Hospital Westmead)
- Royal Anniversary Regatta Association of NSW (also known as Australia Day Regatta)
- Royal Anthropological Society of Australasia
- Royal Art Society of New South Wales
- Royal Association of Justices of South Australia
- Royal Association of Justices of Western Australia
- Royal Australasian College of Medical Administrators
- Royal Australasian College of Physicians
- Royal Australasian College of Surgeons
- Royal Australasian College of Dental Surgeons
- Royal Australasian Ornithologists Union
- Royal Australian Air Force
- Royal Australian and New Zealand College of Psychiatrists
- Royal Australian and New Zealand College of Obstetricians and Gynaecologists
- Royal Australian and New Zealand College of Ophthalmologists
- Royal Australian and New Zealand College of Radiologists
- Royal Australian Armoured Corps
- Royal Australian Army Chaplains' Department
- Royal Australian Army Dental Corps
- Royal Australian Army Education Corps
- Royal Australian Army Medical Corps
- Royal Australian Army Nursing Corps
- Royal Australian Army Ordnance Corps
- Royal Australian Army Pay Corps
- Royal Australian Chemical Institute (incorporated by Royal Charter and has permission to use prefix Royal)
- Royal Australian College of General Practitioners
- Royal Australian Corps of Military Police
- Royal Australian Corps of Signals
- Royal Australian Corps of Transport
- Royal Australian Electrical and Mechanical Engineers
- Royal Australian Engineers
- Royal Australian Historical Society
- Royal Australian Infantry Corps
- Royal Australian Institute of Architects
- Royal Australian Navy
- Royal Australian Mint
- Royal Australian Regiment
- Royal Automobile Association of South Australia
- Royal Automobile Club of Australia
- Royal Automobile Club of Queensland
- Royal Automobile Club of Tasmania
- Royal Automobile Club of Victoria
- Royal Automobile Club of Western Australia
- Royal Botanic Gardens, Melbourne and Royal Botanic Gardens, Cranbourne
- Royal Botanic Gardens, Sydney
- Royal Brighton Yacht Club
- Royal Brisbane and Women's Hospital
- Royal Brisbane Institute of Technology
- Royal Caledonian Society of Melbourne
- Royal Caledonian Society of South Australia
- Royal Canberra Golf Club
- Royal Children's Hospital, Herston
- Royal Children's Hospital, Melbourne
- Royal College of Pathologists of Australasia
- Royal College of Nursing Australia
- Royal Darwin Hospital
- Royal Dental Hospital of Melbourne
- Royal District Nursing Service of South Australia
- Royal Far West Children's Health Scheme (Also known as Royal Far West and Royal Far West Children's Health Scheme and Services for the Aged)
- Royal Federation of Aero Clubs of Australia
- Royal Flying Doctor Service
- Royal Freemason's Benevolent Institution of New South Wales
- Royal Freemason's Homes, Victoria
- Royal Fremantle Golf Club
- Royal Freshwater Bay Yacht Club
- Royal Geelong Agricultural & Pastoral Society (which presents the Royal Geelong Show)
- Royal Geelong Yacht Club
- Royal Geographical Society of Australasia
- Royal Geographical Society of Queensland
- Royal Geographical Society of South Australia
- Royal Guide Dogs for the Blind Association of Australia
- Royal Historical Society of Queensland
- Royal Historical Society of Victoria
- Royal Hobart Golf Club
- Royal Hobart Hospital
- Royal Hobart Yacht Club
- Royal Horticultural Society of New South Wales
- Royal Horticultural Society of Queensland
- Royal Horticultural Society of Victoria
- Royal Hospital for Women (Sydney)
- Royal Humane Society of Australasia
- Royal Humane Society of New South Wales
- Royal Institute for Deaf and Blind Children
- Royal Life Saving Society Australia
- Royal Melbourne District Nursing Service
- Royal Melbourne Golf Club
- Royal Melbourne Hospital
- Royal Melbourne Institute of Technology
- Royal Melbourne Philharmonic Society
- Royal Melbourne Tennis Club
- Royal Melbourne Yacht Club
- Royal Melbourne Zoological Gardens
- Royal Military College, Duntroon
- Royal Motor Yacht Club of New South Wales
- The Royal National Agricultural and Industrial Association of Queensland (which presents the Royal Queensland Show)
- Royal National Agricultural & Pastoral Society of Tasmania (which presents the Royal Launceston Show)
- Royal National Capital Agricultural Society (which presents the Royal Canberra Show)
- Royal National Park, Sydney
- Royal Newcastle Aero Club
- Royal Newcastle Hospital
- Royal Norfolk Island Agricultural and Historical Society
- Royal North Australia Show Society
- Royal North Shore Hospital (Sydney)
- Royal New South Wales Bowling Association
- Royal New South Wales Canine Council Ltd (also known as Dogs NSW)
- Royal New South Wales Regiment
- Royal Over-Seas League
- Royal Perth Golf Club
- Royal Perth Hospital
- Royal Perth Yacht Club
- Royal Philatelic Society of Victoria
- Royal Port Pirie Yacht Club
- Royal Prince Alfred Hospital
- Royal Prince Alfred Yacht Club
- Royal Prince Edward Yacht Club
- Royal Queensland Aero Club
- Royal Queensland Art Society
- Royal Queensland Bowls Association
- Royal Queensland Bush Children's Health Scheme (also known as Bush Children's)
- Royal Queensland Golf Club
- Royal Queensland Regiment
- Royal Queensland Yacht Squadron
- Royal Randwick Racecourse
- Royal Regiment of Australian Artillery
- Royal Rehabilitation Centre Sydney
- Royal Society for the Prevention of Cruelty to Animals, Australia
- Royal Society for the Blind
- Royal Society for the Welfare of Mothers and Babies (also known as Tresillian Family Care Centres)
- Royal Society of New South Wales
- Royal Society of Queensland
- Royal Society of South Australia
- Royal Society of St George
- Royal Society of Tasmania
- Royal Society of Victoria
- Royal Society of Western Australia
- Royal South Australia Regiment
- Royal South Australian Bowling Association
- Royal South Australian Deaf Society
- Royal South Australian Society of Arts
- Royal South Australian Yacht Squadron
- Royal South Street Society
- Royal South Yarra Lawn Tennis Club
- Royal Sydney Golf Club
- Royal Sydney Philatelic Club
- Royal Sydney Yacht Squadron
- Royal Talbot Rehabilitation Centre
- Royal Tasmanian Botanical Gardens
- Royal Tasmania Regiment
- Royal United Services Institute of Australia
- Royal United Services Institute of New South Wales
- Royal United Services Institute of Queensland
- Royal United Services Institute of South Australia
- Royal United Services Institute of Tasmania
- Royal United Services Institute of Victoria
- Royal United Services Institute of Western Australia
- Royal Victoria Regiment
- Royal Victorian Aero Club
- Royal Victorian Association of Honorary Justices
- Royal Victorian Bowls Association
- Royal Victorian Eye & Ear Hospital
- Royal Victorian Motor Yacht Club
- Royal Volunteer Coastal Patrol
- Royal Western Australia Regiment
- Royal Western Australian Bowling Association
- Royal Western Australian Historical Society
- Royal Women's Hospital, Melbourne
- Royal Yacht Club of Tasmania
- Royal Yacht Club of Victoria
- Royal Zoological Society of South Australia
- Royal Zoological Society of New South Wales
- Scout Association of Australia (incorporated by Royal Charter)
- The Royal Commonwealth Society
- Royal King's Park Tennis Club

Variety the Children's Charity Australia

== See also ==
- List of Canadian organizations with royal patronage
- List of Irish organizations with royal patronage
- List of New Zealand organizations with royal patronage
- List of UK organisations with Royal patronage
- Organisations with former royal patronage in Hong Kong
- Royal Charter
