= Women's bowls in Australia =

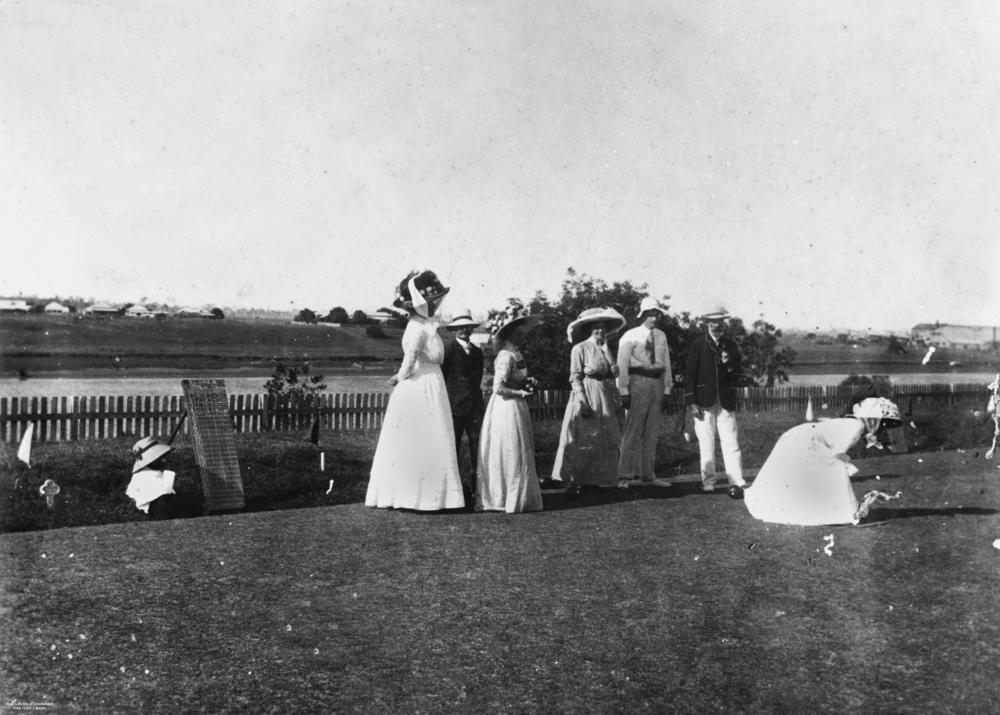
- Lawn bowls, Maryborough, ca. 1907
- Country: Australia
- National team: Australia

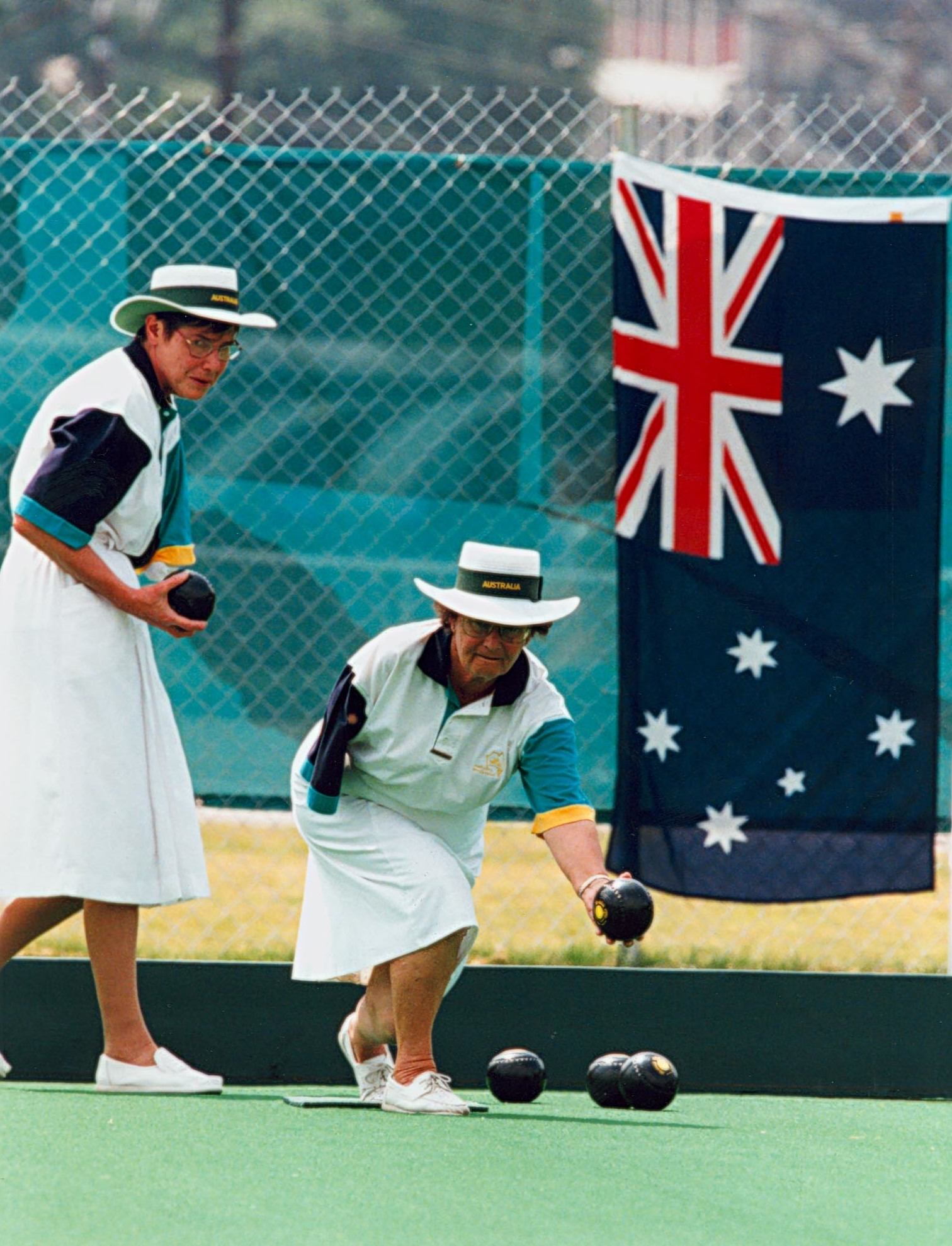
Pauline Chaill and Australian bowler Clark at the 1996 Atlanta Paralympic Games

The first women's bowls match played in Australia took place in Stawell, Victoria, in October 1881. The first women's only bowls club was not created for another seventeen years, when the Rainsford Bowls Club was created on 16 December 1898 at the home of J. Rainsford Needham, who lived in Glenferrie, Victoria. The first women's bowls association was created in September 1907. The association was called the Victorian Ladies' Bowling Association, and was created by six Melbourne-based clubs. It was the first women's bowling association created the world.

In 1902, a women's bowling club was created in Ashfield, New South Wales, by daughters, wives, and sisters of a men's club in the region.

Lawn bowls was a popular women's sport in Australia during the 1900s. It was viewed as fashionable for women to play. The game was acceptable for women to play because men did not perceive the game as strenuous for women to play. Uniforms of the time were similar to other sports of the era: Large hats, long multilayered skirts, tight belts, and long sleeved blouses. One place the sport was being played was in Maryborough, Queensland by 1907.

In 1922, the New South Wales Ladies' Bowling Association was created. That same year, the Kenningston Gardens Bowling and Tennis Club was created in South Australia. This was the first women's bowls club formed in the state. In 1926, a women's only bowls club was created in Loton Park, Western Australia. This was the first women's only bowls club created in the state.

In 1922, the Riverview Ladies' Bowling Club was created. It was the first women's only bowling club to be formed in Queensland.

In 1934, the Victorian Women's Centennial Sports Carnival was held. The event was organised by the Victorian Women's Amateur Sports Council and held at the Melbourne Cricket Grounds. The purpose was to increase women's interest in sport by providing them opportunities to play. Sports that were included on the programme included cricket, field hockey, women's basketball, bowls, rowing, swimming, athletics, rifle shooting, baseball, golf, tennis and badminton. There were over 1,000 bowlers involved over the course a week. Cricket featured a match versus a visiting English side. Women's basketball featured a Victorian side playing against a representative all Australian side. There was a day for watersports such as swimming and rowing. A tennis tournament was held. A field hockey tournament featuring Australian, Kiwi and Fijian teams was played.

Australian women's sports had an advantage over many other women's sport organisations around the world in the period after World War II. Women's sport organisations had largely remained intact and were holding competitions during the war period. This structure survived in the post war period. Women's sport were not hurt because of food rationing, petrol rationing, population disbursement, and other issues facing post-war Europe.

In 1949, the first national women's bowls championship took place in the country. It was held in Sydney and took place two years after the creation of a national women's bowls association, the Australian Women's Bowling Council. This first championship was won by Mrs. R. Cranley, who represented the Coorparoo Club in Queensland.

At the 1982 Commonwealth Games held in Brisbane, Australia, new women's sports were included on the programming including archery and lawn bowls.

Up until 2000, lawn bowls was gender segregated across Australia. In 2001 the Victorian Civil and Administrative Tribunal required the Royal Victorian Bowling Association to amend its rules so that all genders could be affiliated members. Exemptions have been introduced to provide pathways to gendered national competitions, such as the Australian National Bowls Championships. Subsequently changes were introduced in other States and Territories. In 2012, Bowls Victoria worked with the Victorian Equal Opportunity and Human Rights Commission to publish a guide to equal opportunity in lawn bowls. In 2018, Bowls Australia issued a position statement on open bowls. In 2020-2021, Bowls Australia took steps towards readdressing the gender balance in bowls and released a Women in Bowls Strategy.

== Bibliography ==
- Howell, Max; Howell, Reet; Brown, David W. (1989). The Sporting Image, A pictorial history of Queenslanders at play. Brisbane: University of Queensland Press. ISBN 0-7022-2206-2.
- Pollard, Jack (1968). AMPOL book of Australian Sporting Records. Sydney: The Pollard Publishing Co. OCLC 71140.
- Stell, Marion K. (1991). Half the Race, A history of Australian women in sport. North Ryde, Australia: HarperCollins. ISBN 0-207-16971-3.
