= Waldie =

Waldie is a surname, and may refer to:

- D. J. Waldie (born 1948), American essayist
- Jerome R. Waldie (1925–2009), American politician
- John Waldie (1833–1907), Canadian politician
- Marc Waldie (born 1955), American volleyball player

== See also ==
- Waldie-Griffith baronets
