= Royal Geological Society of Ireland =

The Royal Geological Society of Ireland traces its origin to the founding in 1831 in Dublin of the Geological Society of Dublin. Its initial membership included academics, aristocrats, professionals and clerics.

The society developed under the direction of individuals such as geologists Reverend Professor Samuel Haughton, Colonel Joseph Ellison Portlock who was taking part in the Ordnance Survey of Ireland, and the geologist and surveyor Richard Griffith, who published the first geological map of Ireland in 1837. Many fundamental concepts in geology were discussed for the first time. The geologist Robert Mallet had life membership and was President of the society from 1846 to 1848.

Other individuals associated with the society were Patrick Ganly and Joseph Beete Jukes. Ganly worked for a number of years with Richard Griffith as a geological surveyor on the Valuation of Ireland and discovered cross-bedding which showed the way up of strata. Jukes lectured in Dublin as professor of geology for many years, first at the Museum of Irish Industry, and afterwards at the Dublin Royal College of Science for Ireland. During this period he wrote an article On the Mode of Formation of some of the River-valleys in the South of Ireland (Quarterly Journ. Geol. Soc. 1862). The Dublin clergyman Maxwell Henry Close read a paper before the society in 1866, on the General Glaciation of Ireland, a masterly description of the effects of glaciation, and of the evidence in favor of the action of land-ice. He became president of the society in 1878.

The society gained royal patronage and a change in title in 1864.

The Society did not admit women members. Throughout the latter decades of the century, for several reasons, membership slowly declined and the society was wound up in 1894. Through its publications, Journal of the Geological Society of Dublin (1833-1863) and Journal of the Royal Geological Society of Ireland (1864-1888), the society published over 600 articles, mostly on the geology of Ireland.

== See also ==
- List of Irish organizations with royal patronage
