= Sandbelt Bowls Region =

- Sport: Bowls
- Jurisdiction: Victoria
- Affiliation: Bowls Victoria
- President: John Panter
- Vice president(s): Daphne Camilleri

Official website
- www.sandbeltbowlsregion.org.au
- (Australia)

Sandbelt Bowls Region, affiliated with Bowls Victoria is home to 40 lawn bowls clubs in the South and South Eastern Region of Melbourne, Victoria.

== Structure ==
Sandbelt Bowls Region is governed by a Board of Directors, including a president, deputy president, secretary, Bowls Victoria region representatives and 2 ordinary directors.

In addition to the board, a number of sub-committees provide support to the board:

- Championship
- Laws & Umpiring
- Selection
- Pennant
- Coaching
- Greens

The organisation coverage across the Sandbelt Region includes the following bowls clubs:

- Albert Park
- Armadale
- Beaumaris
- Bentleigh
- Black Rock
- Brighton
- Brighton Beach
- Burden Park
- Caulfield Park Alma
- Chadstone
- Chelsea
- Cheltenham
- Clayton
- Coatesville
- Cranbourne
- Dandenong Club
- Dandenong RSL Recreation
- Edithvale
- Elsternwick Club
- Elsternwick Park
- Glen-Eira McKinnon
- Hampton
- Hampton RSL
- Highett
- Keysborough
- Malvern
- Melbourne
- Mentone
- Moorabbin
- Mordialloc
- Murrumbeena
- Murrumbeena Park
- Noble Park
- Oakleigh
- Parkdale
- Sandringham
- South Oakleigh (SOC)
- South Oakleigh
- StKilda
- Toorak
- Willow Lodge

Former clubs:

- Dandenong City (folded 2016)
- Alma Sports (folded 2015, members transferred to Caulfield Park)
