= Royal Australasian College =

Royal Australasian may refer to:

- Royal Australasian College of Dental Surgeons
- Royal Australasian College of Medical Administrators
- Royal Australasian College of Physicians
- Royal Australasian College of Surgeons
