= List of Canadian organizations with royal patronage =

The practice of members of the Canadian Royal Family giving their patronage to Canadian organizations stems from that which started in the United Kingdom in pre-industrial times, when all development of the sciences and arts were under the direct control of the monarch and exercised by the foundation of colleges that today form the basis of modern universities. Today, royal patronage is a ceremonial function wherein the royal person will either volunteer their time for service or make charitable donations, in order to help bring recognition to the group's achievements and to the contributions of different sectors of public life.

Any organization may apply for royal patronage, via the Office of the Governor General; however, to receive the honour, an organization must prove to be long lasting and have aims and objectives that will earn the approval of the person from whom patronage is requested. Also, patronage is typically granted to athletic, artistic, cultural, or charitable organizations; rarely to corporate or for-profit companies. Some charities and volunteer organizations have been founded as gifts to, or in honour of, some of Canada's monarchs or members of the Royal Family, such as the Victorian Order of Nurses (a gift to Queen Victoria for her Diamond Jubilee in 1897), the Canadian Cancer Fund (set up in honour of King George V's Silver Jubilee in 1935), and the Queen Elizabeth II Fund to Aid in Research on the Diseases of Children.

== King Charles III ==
King Charles III is the patron of the following organizations:

- Canadian Warplane Heritage Museum
- Royal Hamilton Yacht Club
- Canadian Businesses for Social Responsibility
- Regina Symphony Orchestra
- Willowbank School of Restoration Arts
- The Royal Conservatory of Music

== Prince Andrew, Duke of York ==
Prince Andrew was the patron of the following organizations, until returning these patronages to the Queen in 2022:

- Canadian Canoe Museum (2006–2019)
- Canadian International Air Show
- Lakefield College School (as Trustee)
- Maple Bay Yacht Club ( -2019)
- Royal Victoria Yacht Club ( -2019)
- Royal United Services Institute of Alberta
- Friends of Lakefield College School ( -2019)
- Robert Trent Jones Scholarship Foundation

== Prince Edward, Duke of Edinburgh ==
Prince Edward is the patron of the following organizations:

- Globe Theatre (Regina, Saskatchewan)
- The Duke of Edinburgh's Award, Young Canadians Challenge Charter for Business (as Honorary Chairman)

== Sophie, Duchess of Edinburgh ==
The Duchess of Edinburgh is the patron of the following organizations:

- New Haven Trust
- Toronto General Hospital
- Spruce Meadows, One of the top show jumping venue in the World (as Royal Patronage)

== Anne, Princess Royal ==
Princess Anne is the patron of the following organizations:

- Canadian Therapeutic Riding Association
- Princess Margaret Cancer Centre
- Emerging Leaders' Dialogue Canada (as President)
- Royal Canadian Yacht Club

== Princess Alexandra, The Honourable Lady Ogilvy ==
Princess Alexandra is the patron of the following organizations:

=== Civilian ===
- Friends of the Osborne and Lillian H. Smith Collections

=== Military ===
- Royal Canadian Military Institute (as Colonel-in-Chief)

== Viceroys ==
The viceroys are the patrons of the following organizations:

=== New Brunswick ===
- Royal New Brunswick Rifle Association
- Royal United Services Institute of New Brunswick (Honorary)

=== Ontario ===
==== Civilian ====
- Royal Canadian Institute
- Royal Ontario Museum
- Royal Botanical Gardens

==== Military ====
- Royal Canadian Military Institute

== Former patronages ==
=== Queen Elizabeth II ===
Before her death in 2022, Queen Elizabeth II was the patron of the following organizations:

==== Civilian ====
- Canadian Cancer Society
- Canadian Medical Association
- Canadian National Exhibition Association
- Canadian Nurses Association
- Canadian Red Cross Society
- Commonwealth Parliamentary Association
- Federated Women's Institutes of Canada
- Imperial Order Daughters of the Empire
- Queen's Plate
- Royal Agricultural Winter Fair of Toronto
- Royal Alberta Museum
- Royal Architectural Institute of Canada
- Royal British Columbia Museum
- Royal Canadian Humane Association
- Royal Canadian Legion
- Royal College of Physicians and Surgeons of Canada
- Royal Manitoba Theatre Centre
- Royal Manitoba Winter Fair
- Royal Nova Scotia International Tattoo
- Royal Saskatchewan Museum
- Royal Winnipeg Ballet
- Save the Children Canada
- St. John Ambulance
- St. John's-Ravenscourt School
- Toronto French School

==== Military ====
- Royal Canadian Air Force Benevolent Fund
- Royal Canadian Naval Benevolent Fund
- Navy League of Canada
- Royal Canadian Naval Association
- Royal Canadian Air Force Association

=== Prince Philip, Duke of Edinburgh ===
==== Civilian ====
Organization	Position
Canadian Club of Toronto	Patron
Massey College, Toronto	Senior Fellow
Royal Nova Scotia Yacht Squadron	Patron
Upper Canada College	Visitor
Royal Canadian Yacht Club	Patron
Royal Society of Canada	Honorary Fellow
Canadian Medical Association	Honorary Member
Royal St. Lawrence Yacht Club of Montreal	Patron
Royal Vancouver Yacht Club	Patron
Royal Montreal Curling Club	Honorary Life Member
Canadian Power & Sail Squadrons	Patron
Canadian Aeronautics and Space Institute	Patron
Dawson City Museum and Historical Society	Patron
Canadian Curling Association	Patron
Outward Bound Trust, Canada	Patron
Vancouver Rowing Club	Patron
Upper Canada College Campaign	Patron
British Railway Modellers of North America	Honorary Member
Canadian Power Squadrons	Patron
College of Family Physicians of Canada	Honorary Member
Engineering Institute of Canada	Honorary Member
Fondation de la Faune du Québec	Honorary Life Member
Loyal Canadian Prince Club	Honorary Member
Porcupine Rod and Gun Club	Life Member
South Saskatchewan Wildlife Association	Honorary Life Member
Toronto Club	Honorary Life Member
Toronto Press Club	Honorary Member
University Club of Montreal	Honorary Member
Vancouver Racquets Club	Honorary Member
World Affairs Canada	Patron
Canadian Cutting Horse Association	Patron
Canadian Water Ski Association – now named Water Ski & Wakeboard Canada	Honorary Patron
Brant Wildlife Festival	Patron

==== Military ====
Organization	Position
Naval Officers' Association of Canada	Patron
HMCS Discovery Wardroom	Life Member
Royal Canadian Naval Sailing Association	Honorary Commodore
Royal Canadian Regiment Association	Patron
Seaforth Highlanders of Canada Officers' Mess	Life Member

=== Queen Alexandra ===
Queen Alexandra is the patron of the following organization:

- Queen Alexandra Foundation for Children

== See also ==
- List of Australian organisations with royal patronage
- List of New Zealand organizations with royal patronage
- List of Irish organizations with royal patronage
- List of UK organisations with royal patronage
- List of Canadian organizations with royal prefix
- Colonel-in-Chief: Canadian Forces
- Monarchy of Canada
