= Maxwell Henry Close =

Irish clergyman and geologist (1822–1903)

- Born: 1822; Dublin, Ireland
- Died: 12 September 1903 (aged 80–81); Dublin
- Education: Trinity College, Dublin
- Known for: Publications on Glaciation of Ireland
- Awards: MA (Trinity College, Dublin), membership RIA
- Scientific career
- Fields: Geology, astronomy, physics, Irish language

Maxwell Henry Close (1822 – 12 September 1903) was an Irish Church of Ireland clergyman and geologist who also contributed to the preservation of the Irish language.

== Life ==
He was born in Dublin, Ireland, the son of Henry Samuel Close, a well-known lawyer whose family came from Drumbanagher in County Armagh. He was educated at Weymouth and at Trinity College, Dublin, where he graduated in 1846; and two years later he entered holy orders.

For a year he was curate of All Saints, Northampton; from 1849 to 1857 he was rector of Shangton in Leicestershire; and then for four years he was curate of Waitham-on-the-Wolds.

On the death of his father in 1861 he returned to Dublin, and while giving his services to various churches in the city, devoted himself almost wholly to literary and scientific pursuits, and especially to the glacial geology of Ireland, on which subject he became an acknowledged authority. His paper, read before the Royal Geological Society of Ireland in 1866, on the General Glaciation of Ireland is a masterly description of the effects of glaciation, and of the evidence in favor of the action of land-ice. Later on he discussed the origin of the elevated shell-bearing gravels near Dublin and expressed the view that they were accumulated by floating ice when the land had undergone submergence.

In 1872 George H Kinahan and Maxwell Close published jointly an important paper entitled The Glaciation of Iar-Connaught and its Neighbourhood in the Counties of Galway and Mayo. It was a private publication, accompanied by a large map showing the pattern of striae over Connemara and south County Mayo.

He was for a time treasurer of the Royal Irish Academy, an active member of the Royal Dublin Society, and president in 1878 of the Royal Geological Society of Ireland. Astronomy and physics, as well as the ancient language and antiquities of Ireland, attracted his attention. He was a founder member of the Gaelic Union, which he helped to finance, and the Society for the Preservation of the Irish Language. Through the last decades of the 19th century he was Treasurer to both these societies. He was also a very early member of Conradh na Gaeilge, the Gaelic League, which he supported financially. In his will he left £1,000 for the publication of a dictionary of Irish based largely on the old manuscripts. The first volume was published in 1913 and the final volume in 1973.

Close died in Dublin on 12 of September 1903.
