= List of organisations based in the Republic of Ireland with royal patronage =

Royal charters and royal patronage were historically granted to organisations in Ireland by the Monarch of Ireland when all of Ireland was part of the Kingdom of Ireland and, later, the United Kingdom of Great Britain and Ireland. Since the independence of most of Ireland from the United Kingdom as the Irish Free State in December 1922, and the official abolition of the monarchy by the Constitution of Ireland in 1937 and the Republic of Ireland Act 1948, no new royal charters have been granted in the Republic of Ireland (Northern Ireland remains within the United Kingdom).

Despite the end of the monarchy in the Republic of Ireland, several organisations based in the Republic of Ireland have retained the "royal" element in their names. The continued use of this naming style in the Republic of Ireland is sometimes questioned by commentators as being outdated and a reminder of a colonial past. However, many of these organisations, such as the Royal Irish Academy, consider themselves to be All Ireland organisations, covering both Northern Ireland, which remains part of a monarchy, as well as the Republic of Ireland.

See also List of organisations with a British royal charter, which includes organisations throughout the world.

== Bodies with "royal" in their names ==
- Royal British Legion – Republic of Ireland branch
- Royal Academy of Medicine in Ireland
- Royal Anthropological Institute of Great Britain and Ireland
- Royal Asiatic Society of Great Britain and Ireland
- Royal Alfred Yacht Club
- Royal and Prior School, Raphoe
- Royal College of Physicians of Ireland
- Royal College of General Practitioners – (Republic of Ireland Faculty)
- Royal College of Surgeons in Ireland (RCSI)
- Royal Commonwealth Society Ireland Branch (RCS Ireland)
- Royal Cork Yacht Club
- Royal Curragh Golf Club
- Royal Dublin Golf Club
- Royal Dublin Society (RDS)
- Royal Hibernian Academy (RHA)
- Royal Hospital Donnybrook
- Royal Horticultural Society of Ireland
- Royal Institution of Chartered Surveyors
- Royal Institute of the Architects of Ireland (RIAI)
- Royal Irish Academy of Music
- Royal Irish Academy (RIA)
- Royal Irish Automobile Club (RIAC)
- Royal Irish Yacht Club
- Royal National Lifeboat Institution (Ireland Region)
- Royal St. George Yacht Club
- Royal School Cavan
- Royal Society of Antiquaries of Ireland (RSAI)
- Royal Town Planning Institute – (RTPI Ireland)
- Royal Western Yacht Club of Ireland
- Royal Victoria Eye and Ear Hospital

== Other bodies with royal charters ==
- King's Inns, established by royal charter in 1541
- Trinity College Dublin, sole college of the University of Dublin, with a founding charter of 1592
- University College Cork (formerly Queen's College Cork) – granted a royal charter in 1845
- University of Galway (formerly Queen's College Galway) – granted a royal charter in 1849
- Law Society of Ireland – granted a royal charter in 1852 under the name "The Incorporated Society of Attorneys and Solicitors of Ireland"
- Institution of Engineers of Ireland – granted a royal charter in 1877
- The High School, Dublin, Erasmus Smith Trust, granted a royal charter in 1669

== Former bodies ==
- Royal Bank of Ireland – merged with AIB in 1970
- Royal City of Dublin Hospital
- Royal College of Science for Ireland – absorbed into University College Dublin in 1926.
- Royal Cork Institution
- Royal Geological Society of Ireland
- Royal Hospital Kilmainham
- Royal Hibernian Marine School – merged with other schools to form Mount Temple Comprehensive School.
- Royal Hibernian Military School
- Royal Irish Art Union
- Royal Irish Athletics Club - established on 28 June 1872, it was later renamed the Irish Champion Athletic Club (ICAC).
- Royal Irish Institution
- Royal Military Infirmary
- Royal Munster Yacht Club – merged with Royal Cork Yacht Club in 1966.
- Royal Veterinary College of Ireland – merged into University College Dublin in 1977.
- Royal Zoological Society of Ireland – renamed as the Zoological Society of Ireland in 1993.

== See also ==
- List of organisations in the United Kingdom with a royal charter
- List of Australian organisations with royal patronage
- List of Canadian organizations with royal patronage
- List of New Zealand organisations with royal patronage
