= Melbourne Bowling Club =

- Nickname: Demons, Dees
- Founded: 1864; 162 years ago
- Colors
- President: Rick Lawler
- Secretary: Sean Ingram
- Website: melbournebowlingclub.com

The Melbourne Bowling Club, nicknamed the Demons, and affiliated with Bowls Victoria (BV), is the oldest lawn bowling club in Australia. Founded in 1864, the club has been based at Union Street, Windsor, Victoria, Australia on a continuous basis since formation.

Melbourne's uniform consists of a shirt displaying a Red and white devil, on a blue background, and blue pants/shorts with "Melbourne" prominently displayed along their length.

Historically the club has had many successes going back to 1892, and since the formation of the Premier League in 1997 Melbourne has won eight premierships having played in 17 grand finals in 21 years.

The club also currently fields a team in Divisions 2, 4 and 8 in the Bowls Victoria Saturday Metropolitan Pennant competitions.

== History ==
=== Early years ===
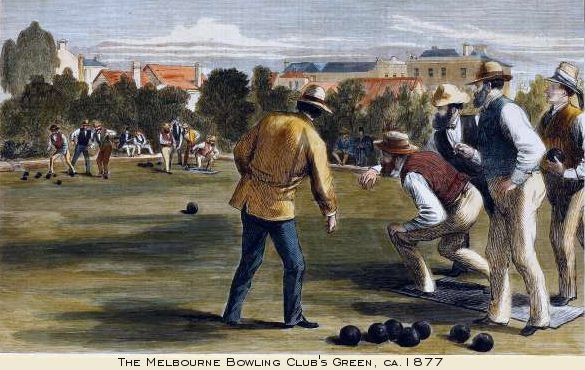
Bowls game at the MBC, 1877

On 11 March 1864 The Melbourne Bowling Club was founded by John Campbell, obtaining a lease of land at “Chapel” Street (facing Union Street), as recorded as the first entry in the records of the club in the handwriting of John Campbell. The club has continuously occupied this same parcel of land ever since. This record makes Melbourne Bowling Club the oldest bowling club in Australia. By October that year, the bowls greens were in full operation, as was a temporary structure for entertaining, as well as facilities for quoits and croquet.

In 1865 a breakaway group formed the Prahran Bowling club, and this remained so until the 1980s, when Prahran’s greens were closed and the members rejoined Melbourne.

In 1867, the painter S. T. Gill visited the Melbourne Bowling Club and painted two water-colours of a bowls match in progress, one of the summer green and one of the winter green. The paintings were purchased by members, and were presented to the club as a gift in 1892.

In 1887, the original Georgian style double story brick clubhouse was opened, which still stands today. The original building had upper and lower verandas with ornate iron-lace work, which were removed during renovations over the intervening years. Gas lighting was added in later years.

In addition to bowls, the club catered for a wide variety of activities during this period, including skittles and tennis. Remnants of the skittles alley were rediscovered in the foundations during renovations in the 1900s.

During this time also saw the formation of the Victorian Bowling Association (1880), and the number of inter-club competitions grew, with the first premiership “pennant” trophy being awarded to Melbourne in 1892

In 1899, Melbourne Bowling Club player, Major B.J. Wardill, in England to watch the Australian Cricket team under the captaincy of Joe Darling, met with him and English bowler Mr S.E. Yelland. As a result of the meeting, Major Wardill arranged for the Victorian and NSW Association Presidents, also travelling to England, to meet with Mr Yelland, resulting in the formation of the Imperial Bowling Association, becoming the International Bowling Board, now World Bowls Ltd, the governing body for bowls worldwide.

=== 1900–1950s ===
The early 1900s was a successful period for Melbourne Bowling club on the field when it won many championships as a team, as well as numerous members winning state and Australian titles. In the 1920s the club saw a number of extensions built, including a long single storey building added to the side in 1923, and which is still in use today. The club was very fortunate to have a number of patrons, who supported the club in many ways, including R.G. Watson, who left a legacy to the club in the form of the R.G. Watson Trust, and R.G. Watson Trophy tournament, which still runs today to honour his name and contribution.

=== 1950s–1990s ===
The 1950s also saw a great deal of on-field success, and the club extended its Windsor site by acquiring surrounding properties with the view to future extensions.

The club throughout the 1900s was a hub of social activity as well, with large member gatherings for social as well as bowls based functions. In particular the Thursday member night formal dinners were high sought after events to attend. These events were regularly reported in The Argus, The Malvern Standard and Malvern Times, excerpts of which can be found on the club website today(ref).

=== 1990s–present ===
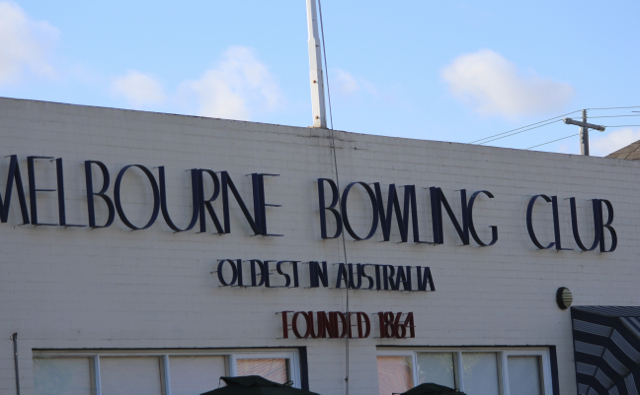
Melbourne BC facade, 2013

Neighbouring houses were incorporated into the clubhouse to provide a gaming room, which has now been converted into a meeting room “The Demons Den”. In 1997, Bowls Victoria (formerly the Royal Victorian Bowls Association) formed the Premier League pennant competition, to represent the highest level of competition in metropolitan Melbourne. Melbourne Bowling Club has been represented in Premier league every year since inception, and to date has appeared in the final x times, winning x times, also capturing 3 State Pennant titles as well. The current player group include a number of region, state and Australian representatives, and the honour boards are testament to success at region, state, national and international levels. In 2014, the club celebrates its 150th anniversary.

== Club symbols and identity ==
=== Uniform ===
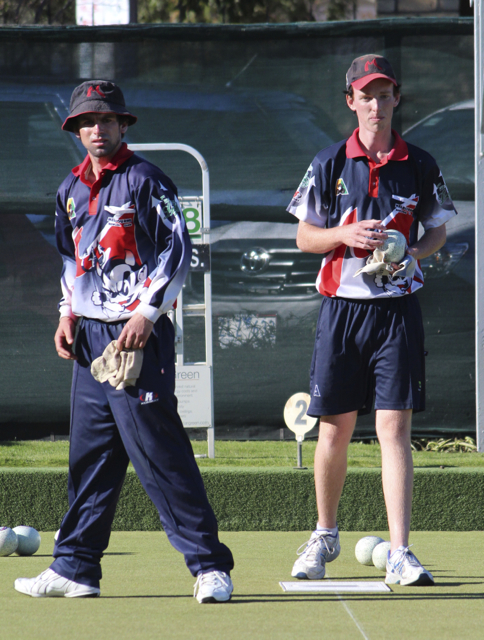
Melbourne Bowling Club and Australian representative players Russell Green Jnr and Dylan Fisher

One of the early adopters of coloured uniforms, Melbourne distinctive Blue, Red, and White Uniform features a stylised “M” on the front of the shirt, together with a cartoon style Devil.

=== Song ===
The club song is sung to the tune of “You're a Grand Old Flag”, George Cohen, 1906

It’s a grand old flag
It’s a high flying flag
It’s the emblem for me and for you
It’s the emblem of the team we love
The team of the Red and the Blue
Ev’ry heart beats true
For the Red and the Blue
And we sing this song to you (What do we sing!)
Should old acquaintance be forgot
Keep your eye on the Red and the Blue

=== Committees ===
==== Club Committee ====
President:	Rick Lawler
Secretary:	Sean Ingram
Treasurer:	Ewen Wilson
Members:	Ben Fearn, Jacinta Murray, Janine Rischin & Jimmy Whitehead

==== Match Committee ====
Chairman:	Sean Ingram
Selectors:	Gordon Lowing, Janine Rischin, Kevin Lehane, Paul Titcombe

=== Membership ===
==== Size ====
Club membership in 2021 is approximately 250, and the club fields teams in 4 competitions in the Bowls Victoria Saturday Pennant Competition, 1 team in the Bowls Victoria Midweek Pennant Competition as well as a team in the Southern District Electric Light Bowls Association.

==== Demographics ====
The club attracts a broad range of members across the metropolitan region. Largely due to the ongoing success of the Premier League side, close to 60% of the membership comes from outside the local Stonnington Council area.

== Club Honours ==
=== Premierships ===
- Victorian Bowling Association/RVBA
  - 1892, 1896 (Prahran), 1899 (Prahran), 1925, 1927, 1929,1957,1959,1960,
- Bowls Victoria Premier League
  - Premiers 2000, 2003, 2004, 2008, 2012, 2017, 2021, 2022
  - Runners Up 1997, 1998, 2001, 2002, 2006, 2007, 2010, 2013, 2016, 2018
- Champions of State Pennant
  - 1997, 2003, 2012, 2017, 2021
- Other Division Pennants
  - A Reserve 1969, 1972
  - B/B1 Pennant 1935, 1939, 1951, 1969, 1970, 1971
  - B5 Pennant 1956
  - Division 2 Pennant 2015
  - Division 4 Pennant 1990, 2000
  - Division 9 Pennant 2000

== Individual honours ==
=== Australian representatives ===
- 1998–99 – P.D. Arthur (O60s)
- 2004–05 – R. Green Jnr
- 2005–06 – B. Lester
- 2006–07 – B. McCallum (U25s)
- 2011–12 – D. Fisher
- 2015–16 – Curtis Hanley (U18s)

=== Commonwealth Games ===
- 2004 – Bronze Medal - B Lester (Pairs)

=== World Championships ===
- 1976 – South Africa R. Middleton Singles Silver Medal, Pairs Bronze Medal

=== Victorian Representatives ===
- Dennis Arthur
- Ben Fearn (U18)
- Russell Green Jnr
- Grant Hopwood
- Brett Leighton
- John McCarron
- Craig McCarron
- Tayla Morison (U18)
- Scott Mortimer
- Arnold O'Brien
- Brian Richards
- Todd Simmons
- Michael Vesikko
- Curtis Hanley
- Bryce Young
- Shane Fordham
- Matt Ellul

=== Australian Titles ===
- Australian Singles
  - 1898 - G. W. Sims
  - 1902 – G. W. Sims
  - 1903 – E. M. Pascoe
  - 1994 – G. Bridge
- Australian Champion of Champion Singles
  - 2012 – D. Fisher
- Australian Pairs
  - 2013 – R. Green (Jnr) and D. Fisher

=== Victorian Titles ===
- State Singles
  - 1882 – E. J. Lewis
  - 1893 – C. Wood
  - 1897 – G. W. Sims
  - 1930 – W. Trumble
  - 1975 – R. Middleton (Prahran)
  - 2001 - G. Cridge
  - 2006 - B. Lester
  - 2008 - R. Green Jnr
- Champion of Champions Singles
  - 1901 – S. Fry (Prahran)
  - 1903 – A. Wartman
  - 1908 – J. Doig (Prahran)
  - 1909 – E.M. Pascoe
  - 1911 – E.M. Pascoe
  - 1915 – E.M. Pascoe
  - 1916 – E.M. Pascoe
  - 1917 – E.M. Pascoe
  - 1918 – E.M. Pascoe
  - 1921 – E.M. Pascoe
  - 1927 – W. Trumble
  - 1968 – R. Middleton (Prahran)
  - 2001 – G. Maskell
  - 2007 – R. Green Jnr
  - 2012 - D. Fisher
- State Pairs
  - 1922 – J. E. White, T. M. Vains
  - 1928 – C. Johnson, W. C. Dempster
  - 1995 – B.J. Richards, B. Hoey
  - 1996 – E. B. Close (Mixed)
  - 1999 – E.B. Close, G.J. Hopwood
- State Fours
  - 1953 – D. McClymont, A. Fehring, B. Tully, L. Phillips
  - 1966 – M. Connellan, H, R, Ashworth, G. Davies, L. Lehman
  - 1974 – B.K. Samuel, M.J. Donnellan, G. Davies, G. De C. Bosisto
  - 2008 – S Jeffery, P Williamson, J McCarron, R. Green Jnr
- State U35 Singles
  - 2003 – R. Green Jnr
- State U18/19 Singles
  - 1999 – R. Green Jnr
- State U18/19 Triples
  - 1999 – R. Green Jnr
  - 2003 – J. McCarron

==== Life Members ====
- J Blyth*
- R J Cowie*
- D McDougall*
- G Lewis*
- S Elliott*
- W Small*
- S B Hunt*
- E J Lewis*
- T F Morkham*
- G Thompson*
- H A A Embling*
- G W Sims*
- C Andrews*
- H J Westbrook*
- W Thomson*
- F C Jeffery*
- J L Doeg*
- A J Conquest*
- H J Petrie*
- H A Lay*
- L R McIlroy*
- A H Orchard*
- W E Trumble*
- W H McPherson*
- W H Stock*
- F Bacash*
- W M Ward*
- R G Watson*
- A E Wallis*
- H R Ashworth*
- E K O'Donnell*
- J W Morris*
- N W Woody*
- H D Chandler*
- A D Kearton JP*
- G J Hewett*
- E Folks*
- C R Morrell*
- R F Cross*
- C W Sinclair*
- J G (Ted) Took*
- Colin W. Gorman
- Peter Curwen-Walker
- Barry McGregor

(*Deceased)

== In popular culture ==
=== Crackerjack ===
- Melbourne Bowling Club was the major location site for the Australian movie Crackerjack, one of Australia’s highest grossing feature films.

== See also ==
- World Bowls Events
- Bowls Australia
- Bowls Victoria
