= Bowls Victoria =

- Sport: Bowls
- Jurisdiction: Victoria
- Founded: 1880
- Affiliation: Bowls Australia
- Location: Camberwell, Victoria
- President: Pat Schram
- CEO: Tony Sherwill
- Director: Liam Fleming Mark Casey Andrew Holmes Katie O'Halloran Kaz Rothwell

Official website
- www.bowlsvic.org.au
- (Australia)

Bowls Victoria, established in 1880, is the governing body for the sport of bowls in the State of Victoria. In addition to its specific responsibility for governing the sport and the development of the game at all levels, it also has a social objective to enhance existing bowling communities and to position bowls clubs and the sport in the wider community.

Bowls Victoria has a responsibility to govern the game as directed by World Bowls and Bowls Australia, to run events at state level and also to run Pennant competition in the Metro region. We have representative teams at senior, under-25, under-18, over-60 and bowlers arm levels. They also have a responsibility to promote the sport in the community at large and in minorities. Clubs can lean on Bowls Victoria for support in a range of areas.

There are over 520 bowls clubs across Victoria, with 50,000 plus members affiliated with Bowls Victoria.

== History ==
Whilst the game of bowls was well established in Victoria from the 1860s, there was no governing association for the sport until 1880. As early as July 4, 1867, the six clubs in existence at the time, including the oldest Melbourne Bowling Club, met and agreed to a set of rules for the game to be used in inter club matches. Whilst the clubs had regular competition, it was not until 1880, when a Victorian side visited New South Wales, that the Victorian Bowling Association was founded on 23 July 1880.

The sport in Victoria continued to be governed by its own set of laws, which differed to those applied in other parts of the country, particularly New South Wales, and Western Australia. It was not until after the formation of the Australian Bowling Council on September 22, 1911, that uniform rules across the states began to be consolidated into a single set of rules.

In 1947, the association was granted "Royal" status, and became known as the Royal Victorian Bowling Association (RVBA).

In 2001, the Victorian Civil and Administrative Tribunal required the Royal Victorian Bowling Association to amend its rules so that all genders could be affiliated members. The Tribunal found that lawn bowls is a gender neutral sport, in that differences in strength, stamina or physique do not provide a competitive advantage. The Association was granted exemptions to run single-sex competitions so that competitors could compete in single-sex national competitions. In 2012, Bowls Victoria worked with the Victorian Equal Opportunity and Human Rights Commission to publish a guide to equal opportunity in lawn bowls.

Following the unification of the RVBA with the Victorian Ladies Bowling Association (VLBA) (see Women's bowls in Australia) in December 2009, the organisation was renamed to become Bowls Victoria.

== Structure ==
Bowls Victoria is governed by a Board of Directors, including a president, deputy president, finance director and 5 ordinary directors.

The organisation coverage across metropolitan and regional Victoria is structured on a regional and divisional basis:

- Bendigo Campaspe Bowls Region
  - Bendigo District Bowls Division
  - Campaspe Valley Bowls Division
- Central Goulburn Murray Bowls Region
  - Murray Bowls Division
  - Central Bowls Division
  - Goulburn Valley Bowls Division
- Central Victoria Bowls Region
  - BallaratDistrict Bowls Division
  - Central Highlands Bowls Division
  - Goldfields Bowls Division
- Eastern Ranges Bowls Region
- Geelong Bowls Region
- Gippsland Bowls Region
  - East Gippsland Bowls Division
  - North Gippsland Bowls Division
- Metro West Bowls Region
- Murray Malley Bowls Region
  - Murray Valley Bowls Division
  - Northern District Bowls Division
  - Bowls Sunraysia Division
  - Tyrrell Bowls Division
- Northern Gateway Bowls Region
- Ovens & Murray Bowls Region
- Peninsula Casey Bowls Region
  - Flinders Bowls Division
  - Peninsula Bowls Division
- Sandbelt Bowls Region
- Strzelecki Bowls Region
  - West Gippsland Bowls Division
  - South Gippsland Bowls Division
- West Coast Bowls Region
  - Corangamite Bowls Division
  - Far Western Bowls Division
  - Western District Bowls Division
- Wimmera Bowls Region
  - Grampians Bowls Division
  - North Central Bowls Division
  - North Wimmera Bowls Division
  - Wimmera Bowls Division
- Yarra Bowls Region

== See also ==
- Bowls Australia
