= Neva Yacht Club =

Russian sailing club

Coordinates: 59°56′30″N 30°20′00″E

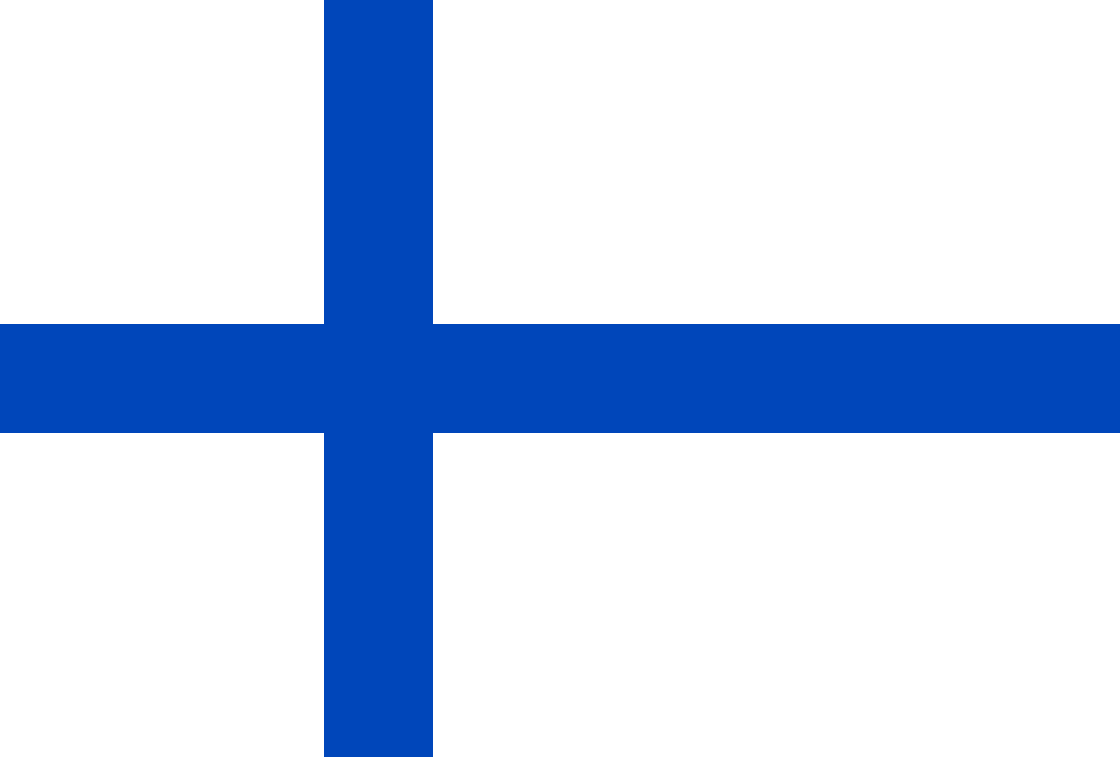
- Neva Yacht Club burgee
- Abbreviation: NYC
- Nickname: Club Neva
- Formation: 1718
- Legal status: Active
- Purpose: Advocate and public voice, educator and network for recreational boating, and competitive sailors, coaches, volunteers and events
- Location: Saint Petersburg, close to the Neva River
- Official language: English, Russian

The Neva Yacht Club (Yacht-club Neva or simply Club Neva) is a sailing club located in Saint Petersburg, Russia, close to the Neva River. It was founded in 1718 and was re-established as a club in 1958. It claims to be the first and oldest yacht club in Russia and even in the world, though this is challenged by the Royal Cork Yacht Club in Ireland.

== History ==
Nevsky Flot (lit. "Fleet of the Neva"), the first yacht club in Russia, was founded by Tsar Peter the Great on April 12, 1718 (the idea had probably been devised as early as 1716, when the First Neva Shipyard started building civilian vessels). The tsar, an enthusiast of naval activities, provided 141 small ships to entertain members of the aristocracy. The flag of the club, a version of the Russian Navy Ensign, was designed and given to the club by the tsar himself. The club ceased activities after the death of the tsar, who had been personally sponsoring the club.

Its date of establishment makes the Neva Yacht Club perhaps the oldest yacht club in the world, and often it is counted as such. However, since this Russian yacht club was established by a decree of the emperor, it does not qualify as a proper club, understood as a voluntary association of members. Therefore, the Royal Cork Yacht Club, founded two years later in 1720, is also widely acknowledged as the oldest yacht club in the world, despite having gone through periods of dormancy and undergone name changes, in much the same manner as the Neva Yacht Club.

It was only in 1846 that the first yacht club in Russia to adopt British-style club regulations was established. The Imperial St. Petersburg Yacht Club had at its origins 19 members and five sailing yachts. Only members of the nobility were admitted.

In 1892, after the initiative of certain high officers of the Russian Imperial Navy, the Neva Yacht Club was revived in memory of Peter the Great's Nevsky Flot. It began regularly organising various sailing competitions meant mainly for large cruising yachts. The Imperial Neva Yacht Club was disbanded after the Russian Revolution.

The current Neva Yacht Club was re-established in 1958. The club only services members of the "Public Association of Amateurs of Aquatic Recreation". It accepts only ship owners as members.

The club is located at address 94, Martynova Quay.

In 2009, the club's repair shop was seriously damaged by a fire.

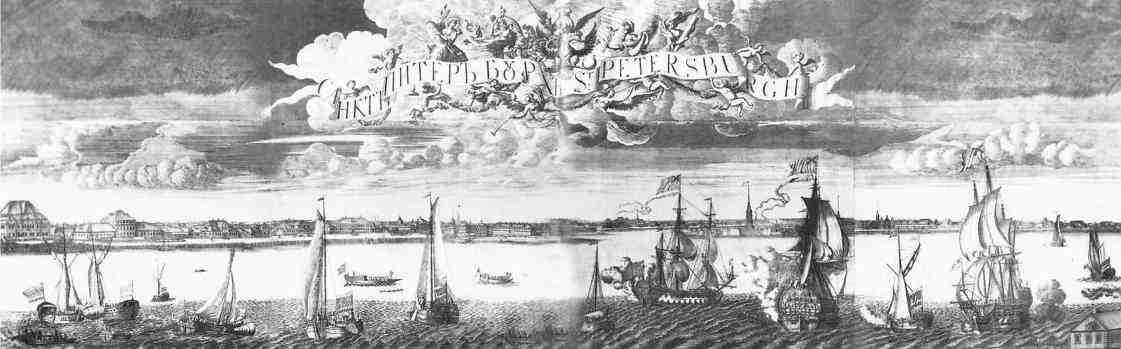
A view of St. Petersburg by Alexey Zubov, 1716, showing yachts and war ships on the Neva River

== See also ==
- Zarya (polar ship)
- Lake Pleshcheyevo

== Bibliography in Russian ==
- Пантелеев Ю. А. Парус - моя жизнь: Из воспоминаний. Л., 1984;
- Ильин В. В России главное - начать!: Воен.-мор. яхт-клуб: (Крат. ист. очерк) // Мор. клуб. 1996. No. 1. С. 68-71;
- Филозопов В. Жемчужина на ладони Невской губы // Капитан-клуб. 1998. No. 3;
- Спорт в Санкт-Петербурге. СПб., 2002. С. 39.
