= Patrick Ganly =

Irish geologist (1809–1899)

- Born: 15 October 1809; Dublin, Ireland
- Died: 29 October 1899 (90 years); Donnybrook, County Dublin
- Resting place: Glasnevin Cemetery, Dublin, Ireland; 53°22′21″N 6°16′36″W
- Citizenship: Ireland
- Partner: Eliza Ganly (d.5 January 1894)
- Scientific career
- Fields: Geology, Surveying, Cartography, valuation

Patrick Ganly (1809–1899) was an Irish geologist, surveyor, civil engineer, cartographer and valuator during Griffith's Survey. He was the first person to discover and describe the usage of cross-bedding in geological stratification to show the 'way up' of rock layers, a discovery overlooked until its independent rediscovery over 70 years later.

== Life and career ==
Ganly was born in the Rotunda Hospital, Dublin, on 15 October 1809 to Ann and Patrick Ganly. His father was a bricklayer. In 1827 he joined Richard Griffith's boundary survey of Ireland, which had begun two years earlier as a precursor to the first Ordnance Survey of Ireland. He was to work a number of years with Griffith as his boss. Between 1830 and 1832 he worked directly for the Ordnance Survey. In 1841 he began study through Trinity College, Dublin, gaining a BA in 1849.

Griffith became Commissioner of Valuation and Ganly worked under him in his role as a valuator. From 1846 to 1849 during the Great Famine years, Ganly was engaged in famine relief under the auspices of the Board of Works, of which Griffith had become chairman. He returned to valuation work in 1853, by which time he had married Mary Elizabeth (Eliza) [maiden name unknown]. He was made redundant from valuation work in 1860. It has been suggested that he may have worked in the US in the early 1850s and worked as a civil engineer in Ireland after 1860.

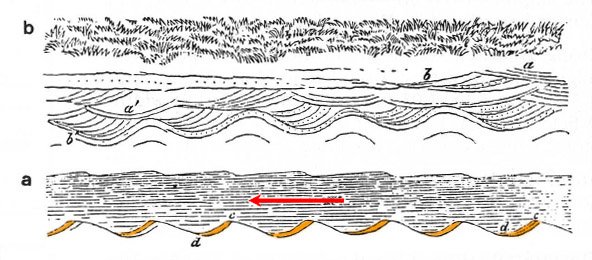
Ganly's sketch of cross-stratification at Carndonagh, County Donegal, Ireland. The bottom shows the direction of river flow (enhanced in red) with the deposited sediment (enhanced in orange) on one side the ripples (c to d). The top shows a cross-section through the riverbed sediment.

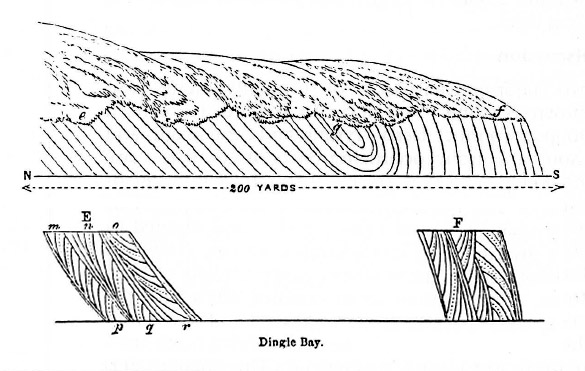
Ganly's sketch of rocks on the shoreline at Coosnagloor, near Mount Eagle on the Dingle peninsula, County Kerry, Ireland. The top part of the sketch shows a tightly folded syncline: north to south the rocks get younger, then the bedding is inverted past the syncline trough. The bottom part details the cross-stratification which helped to indicate the original 'way up' of the rock.

== Contributions to geology and cartography ==
In the early 1830s, Ganly had sketched how the ripples of sediment left by a Donegal river north of Carndonagh had resulted in an undulating cross-sectional pattern. In 1838, at Coosnagloor on the Dingle Peninsula, he made further sketches, noticing cross-bedding in sedimentary rocks along the shore, and as he moved southwards the rocks appeared to be getting younger. At the very southern end, however, the bedding appeared inverted (see illustrations). He correctly interpreted this as synclinal folding. He had discovered a way of showing which way up the stratification had originally occurred.

In May 1856, a paper was read on his behalf to the Geological Society of Dublin of Dublin about fossils in Donegal limestone. On 11 June that year, he read his first paper as a new member of the same Society in which he detailed his discovery of 18 years before concerning the orientation of cross-bedding in rocks. It was not well-received, but his paper was published in the Society journal the following year. The presentation preceding this, by F.J. Foot, was lauded as a significant discovery concerning igneous rocks in Killarney, though Ganly himself had already identified them 20 years earlier as he'd surveyed all 32 counties with precision, including correcting errors such as southern slates wrongly being included in the Lower Palaeozoic instead of Carboniferous period. He read his final paper to the Society in 1861, after it was postponed for two months: "On the past intensity of Sunlight, as indicated by Geological Phenomena".

The true depth of Ganly's contribution to geology, the mapping of Ireland, and – through his valuation work – Irish genealogy, was largely unknown until the twentieth Century. In the 1940s, volumes of communications from Ganly to Griffith were found. Hundreds of letters sent over more than a decade detailed Ganly's fieldwork from at least 1837. After the production of the four-miles-to-one-inch maps, Griffith was lauded for their excellence, receiving the Wollaston Medal and a Baronetcy for this and other work, but the significant increase in precision over his own previous maps, due to Ganly's expertise in the field, was not credited by Griffith. Similarly, Griffith's geological papers relied very significantly on Ganly's on-the-spot interpretations but the latter was not cited.

Eliza Ganly died on 5 January 1894 and was buried at Prospect Cemetery; Patrick Ganly died of heart failure on 29 October 1899 at 52 Main Street, Donnybrook, Dublin, recorded as a civil engineer aged 90 on his death certificate. Ganly was buried in Glasnevin cemetery in the grave of Elizabeth Leary.

== Legacy ==
Though not recognised by established geologists in his lifetime, Ganly's methodology, which is now standard practice, was rediscovered in the 1910s in the USA. Researchers in the mid and late twentieth centuries lifted his memory somewhat to its proper status in the history of geology and cartography – if only in the geological world: he has been described as "Ireland's greatest, but least well-known, geologist".

== See also ==
- Richard Griffith
