= List of New Zealand organisations with royal patronage =

This is a list of New Zealand organisations with royal patronage.

- Cancer Society of New Zealand
- Corps of Royal New Zealand Engineers
- Corps of Royal New Zealand Military Police
- New Zealand Conservation Trust
- New Zealand Medical Association
- New Zealand Riding for the Disabled Association
- New Zealand Thoroughbred Breeders' Association
- Royal Aeronautical Society (New Zealand Division)
- Royal Agricultural Society of New Zealand
- Royal Akarana Yacht Club
- Royal Arcadian Yacht Club
- Royal Astronomical Society of New Zealand
- Royal Auckland Golf Club
- Royal Australasian College of Physicians
- Royal Australasian College of Surgeons
- Royal Australian and New Zealand College of Ophthalmologists
- Royal Australian and New Zealand College of Obstetricians and Gynaecologists
- Royal Australian and New Zealand College of Psychiatrists
- Royal Australian and New Zealand College of Radiologists
- Royal Christchurch Musical Society
- Royal College of Pathologists of Australasia
- Royal Dunedin Male Choir
- Royal East Auckland Curry Club
- Royal Federation of New Zealand Justices' Associations
- Royal Forest and Bird Protection Society of New Zealand
- Royal Humane Society of New Zealand
- Royal New Zealand Aero Club
- Royal New Zealand Air Force
- Royal New Zealand Air Force Museum
- Royal New Zealand Armoured Corps
- Royal New Zealand Army Dental Corps
- Royal New Zealand Army Logistic Regiment
- Royal New Zealand Army Medical Corps
- Royal New Zealand Army Nursing Corps
- Royal New Zealand Army Ordnance Corps
- Royal New Zealand Ballet
- Royal New Zealand Coastguard Federation
- Royal New Zealand College of General Practitioners
- Royal New Zealand Corps of Signals
- Royal New Zealand Corps of Transport
- Royal New Zealand College of Obstetricians and Gynaecologists
- Royal New Zealand Electrical and Mechanical Engineers
- Royal New Zealand Fencible Corps
- Royal New Zealand Foundation of the Blind
- Royal New Zealand Infantry Regiment
- Royal New Zealand Institute of Horticulture
- Royal New Zealand Naval Volunteer Reserve
- Royal New Zealand Navy
- Royal New Zealand Pipe Bands' Association
- Royal New Zealand Plunket Society
- Royal New Zealand Police College
- Royal New Zealand Returned and Services' Association
- Royal New Zealand Show
- Royal New Zealand Society for the Prevention of Cruelty to Animals
- Royal New Zealand Yacht Squadron
- Royal New Zealand Well Digger's Association
- Royal New Zealand Women's Army Corps
- Royal Numismatic Society of New Zealand
- Royal Philatelic Society of New Zealand
- Royal Port Nicholson Yacht Club
- Royal Regiment of New Zealand Artillery
- Royal School of Church Music New Zealand
- Royal Scottish Country Dance Society New Zealand Branch
- Royal Society of New Zealand
- Royal Wanganui Opera House
- Royal Wellington Golf Club

== Royal Family members with honorary military appointments ==
Name	Appointments
Honorary Military Appointments in the New Zealand Defence Force
King Charles III, The King	Admiral of the Fleet of the Royal New Zealand Navy (2015-); Field Marshal in the New Zealand Army (2015-); Marshal of the Royal New Zealand Air Force (2015-); Captain-General of the Royal New Zealand Artillery (2023-)
The Princess Anne, The Princess Royal	Colonel-in-Chief, Royal New Zealand Nursing Corps; Colonel-in-Chief, Royal New Zealand Corps of Signals (since 1977) (Note: In 2006, the Princess Royal's visit to New Zealand included visits to the Corps of Signals.)
Prince Richard, The Duke of Gloucester	Colonel-in-Chief, Royal New Zealand Army Medical Corps
Birgitte, The Duchess of Gloucester	Colonel Commandant of the Royal New Zealand Army Education Corps (since 1985).
Former Honorary Military Appointments
King Charles III, The King (former The Prince Charles, The Prince of Wales)	Air Commodore-in-Chief of the Royal New Zealand Air Force (1977–2015)
Queen Elizabeth II	Captain-General of the Royal Regiment of New Zealand Artillery; Captain-General of the Royal New Zealand Armoured Corps; Colonel-in-Chief, Corps of Royal New Zealand Engineers; Air Commodore-in-Chief, New Zealand Territorial Air Force; Colonel-in-Chief, Royal New Zealand Infantry Regiment; Colonel-in-Chief, The Auckland Regiment (Countess of Ranfurly's Own) (until 1964); Colonel-in-Chief, The Wellington Regiment (until 1964) (Note: Until the re-organisation of the infantry arm of the New Zealand army in 1964.); Colonel-in-Chief, Royal New Zealand Army Ordnance Corps (until 1996; disbanded)
The Prince Andrew, The Duke of York	Colonel-in-Chief, Royal New Zealand Army Logistic Regiment (until January 2022) ("The Duke of York's own"; since 1996 formation) (Note: In 1998, the Duke of York presented the Prince Andrew Banner to the RNZALR in a ceremony in Palmerston North. He last visited the Regiment between 28 September and 2 October 2005)
The Prince Philip, The Duke of Edinburgh	Field Marshal in the New Zealand Army; Admiral of the Fleet of the Royal New Zealand Navy; Marshal of the Royal New Zealand Air Force; Colonel-in-Chief, Corps of Royal New Zealand Electrical and Mechanical Engineers; Colonel-in-Chief, New Zealand Infantry Corps (formerly); Colonel-in-Chief, The Hawke's Bay Regiment (formerly); Colonel-in-Chief, The Otago and Southland Regiment (formerly)
Princess Alexandra of Kent	Colonel-in-Chief, Wellington West Coast and Taranaki Regiment (until 1964)
Prince George, The Duke of Kent	Colonel-in-Chief, Corps of New Zealand Engineers (until 1942)
King Edward VIII	Honorary Colonel, Queen Alexandra's (Wellington West Coast) Mounted Rifles; Honorary Colonel, Regiment of New Zealand Artillery; Honorary Colonel, The Auckland Regiment (Countess of Ranfurly's Own) (all appointments relinquished upon his abdication in 1936)
King George VI	Colonel-in-Chief, Royal New Zealand Armoured Corps; Colonel-in-Chief, Royal New Zealand Artillery; Colonel-in-Chief, The Auckland Regiment
Queen Elizabeth, The Queen Mother	Colonel-in-Chief, New Zealand Scottish Regiment (from 1939); Colonel-in-Chief, Royal New Zealand Army Medical Corps (from 1947)
The Princess Margaret, Countess of Snowdon	Colonel-in-Chief, Royal New Zealand Infantry Corps (until 1964); Colonel-in-Chief, The Northland Regiment (until 1964)
The Prince Arthur, The Duke of Connaught and Strathearn	Colonel-in-Chief, The New Zealand Rifle Brigade (Earl of Liverpool's Own)
The Prince Henry, The Duke of Gloucester	Colonel-in-Chief, Royal New Zealand Army Service Corps
Princess Alice, The Duchess of Gloucester	Colonel-in-Chief, Royal New Zealand Corps of Transport; Colonel-in-Chief, Royal New Zealand Army Service Corps

== See also ==
- List of Australian organisations with royal patronage
- List of Canadian organizations with royal patronage
- List of UK organisations with royal patronage
- List of Irish organizations with royal patronage
- Monarchy in New Zealand
