= Royal Cork Yacht Club =

Ireland's first and oldest yacht club

Coordinates: 51.8042°N 8.3048°W

- Burgee

- Ensign
- Short name: RCYC
- Founded: 1720
- Location: Crosshaven, County Cork, Ireland
- Website: royalcork.com

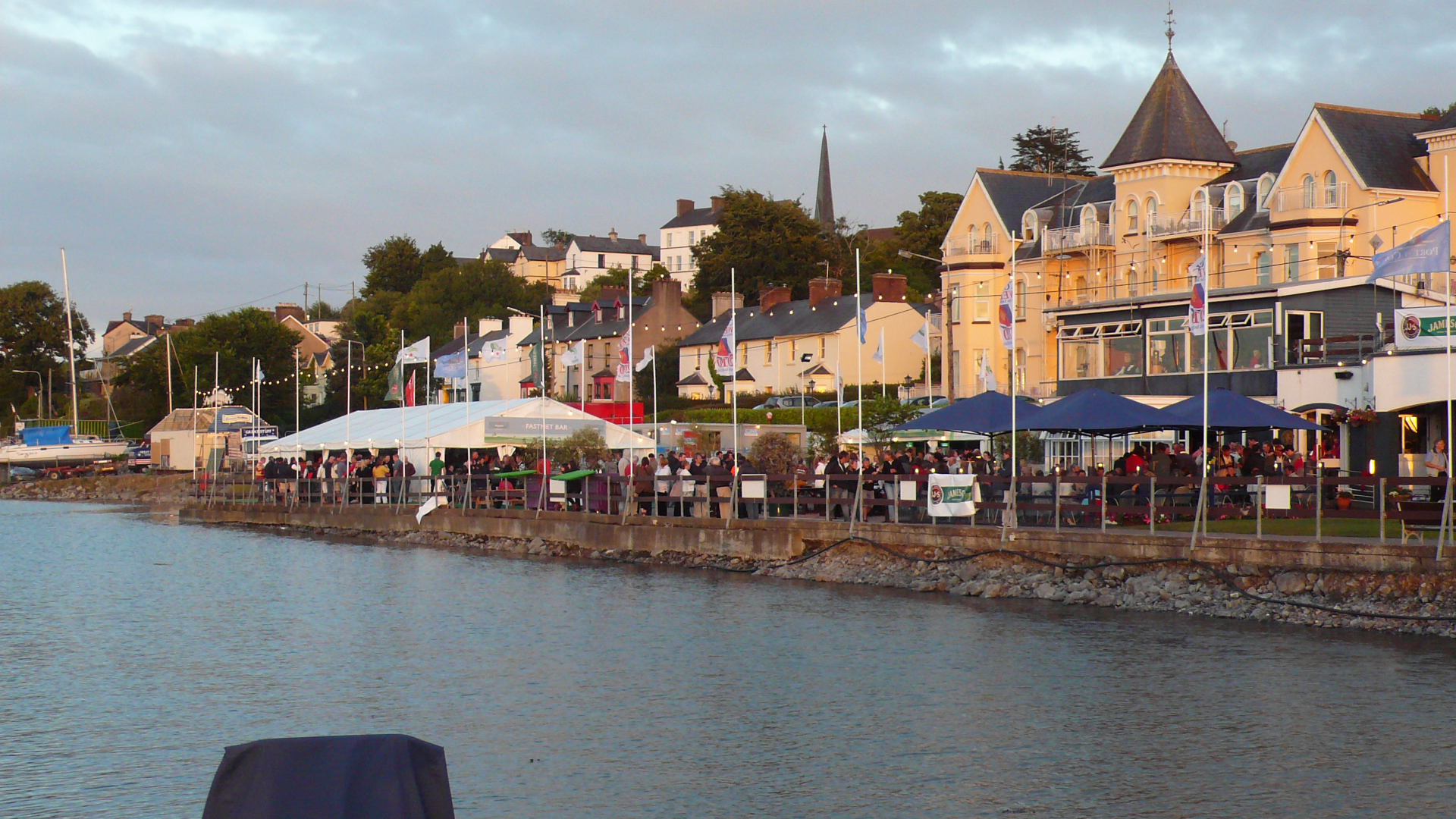
Royal Cork Yacht Club, seen from Owenabue River.

Former ensign of the RCYC, used from 1801 to 1948.

The Royal Cork Yacht Club is a yacht club located in Crosshaven, County Cork, Ireland. Founded in 1720, it is a claimant to the title of the world's oldest yacht club, although this is challenged by the Neva Yacht Club in Russia.

== Formation ==
The predecessor of the present-day Royal Cork Yacht Club was the "Water Club of the Harbour of Cork". It was established in 1720 by William O'Brien, 4th Earl of Inchiquin, a great-grandson of the 1st Earl of Inchiquin, who was a courtier of King Charles II. As a result, the Royal Cork Yacht Club is widely held to be the oldest yacht club in the world.

== Names and locations ==
On returning to England from exile, King Charles II developed an interest in sailing on the Thames, and his courtiers (including the 1st Earl of Inchiquin) subsequently followed his example. Upon the Earl's return to Cork, recreational sailing commenced. Some years later, the 1st Earl of Inchiquin's great-grandson, 26-year-old William O'Brien, and five of his friends formalised their activities and in so doing established The Water Club of the Harbour of Cork in 1720. This body became inactive in 1765 and was re-established in 1802.

By 1806, it was known as the Cork Harbour Water Club. During the 1820s, it changed its name to the Cork Harbour Yacht Club. Later in that decade, it dropped the word "Harbour" and became the Cork Yacht Club. In 1831, the club received the privilege of using the "Royal" prefix from King William IV and became the Royal Cork Yacht Club. In 1966, it merged with the Royal Munster Yacht Club, and the combined entity was known as "The Royal Cork Yacht Club, incorporating the Royal Munster Yacht Club".

The club was originally located on Haulbowline Island in Cork Harbour. During the early nineteenth century, it transferred to Cove, subsequently named Queenstown, now Cobh. It is currently located in Crosshaven, near Cork City.

By the mid 19th century, membership was keenly sought after due to the club's popularity, and club records show that many candidates were disappointed at not getting membership. One who was admitted was Prince Ferdinand Maximilian of Austria, later to be Emperor of Mexico. Prince Ferdinand was the founder of the Imperial Austrian Navy and a brother of Emperor Franz Joseph. The Prince of Wales (later King Edward VII) attended several RCYC regattas, sailing his famous yacht Britannia.

Burgee of the Royal Munster Yacht Club.

In 1872, the Munster Model Yacht Club was founded as a Corinthian Yacht Club to provide for amateur racing rather than racing for wagers on yachts of wealthy owners with paid hands. It eventually received a royal charter and became known as the Royal Munster Yacht Club. It settled in the clubhouse of the Cork Harbour Motor Yacht Club at Crosshaven during the 1930s. The Royal Munster Yacht Club merged with the Royal Cork Yacht Club in 1966.

== Regattas ==
Cork Week is hosted by the Royal Cork Yacht Club and is held every two years, usually in late June or early July.
It was initially Ireland's largest sailing regatta, but has been superseded in popularity, in recent years, by the Dun Laoghaire biennial regatta, as determined by large entries in multiple classes and competitors

== See also ==
- List of organisations based in the Republic of Ireland with royal patronage
- List of Marinas
