= Sir Richard Griffith, 1st Baronet =

Irish geologist and mining engineer

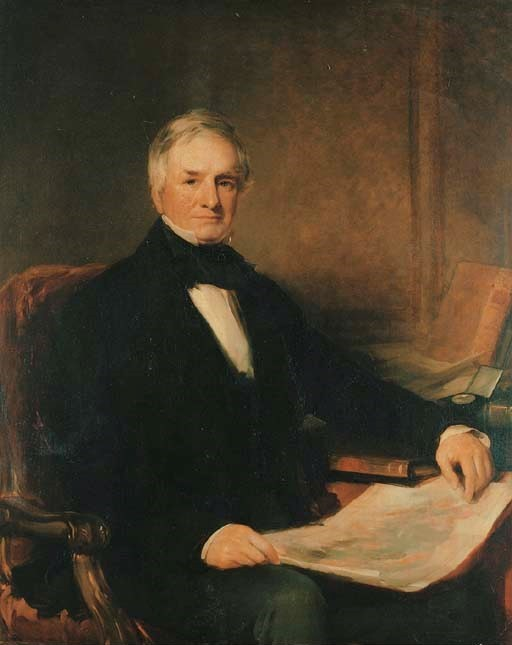
- Portrait of Sir Richard Griffith, 1st Baronet painted by Stephen Catterson Smith
- Born: 20 September 1784; Hume Street, Dublin, Ireland
- Died: 22 September 1878 (aged 94); Dublin, Ireland
- Awards: Wollaston medal (1854)
- Scientific career
- Fields: geology

Sir Richard John Griffith Bt. FRS FRSE FGS LLD (20 September 1784 – 22 September 1878), was an Irish geologist, mining engineer and chairman of the Board of Works of Ireland, who completed the first complete geological map of Ireland and was the author of the valuation of Ireland; subsequently known as Griffith's Valuation.

== Biography ==
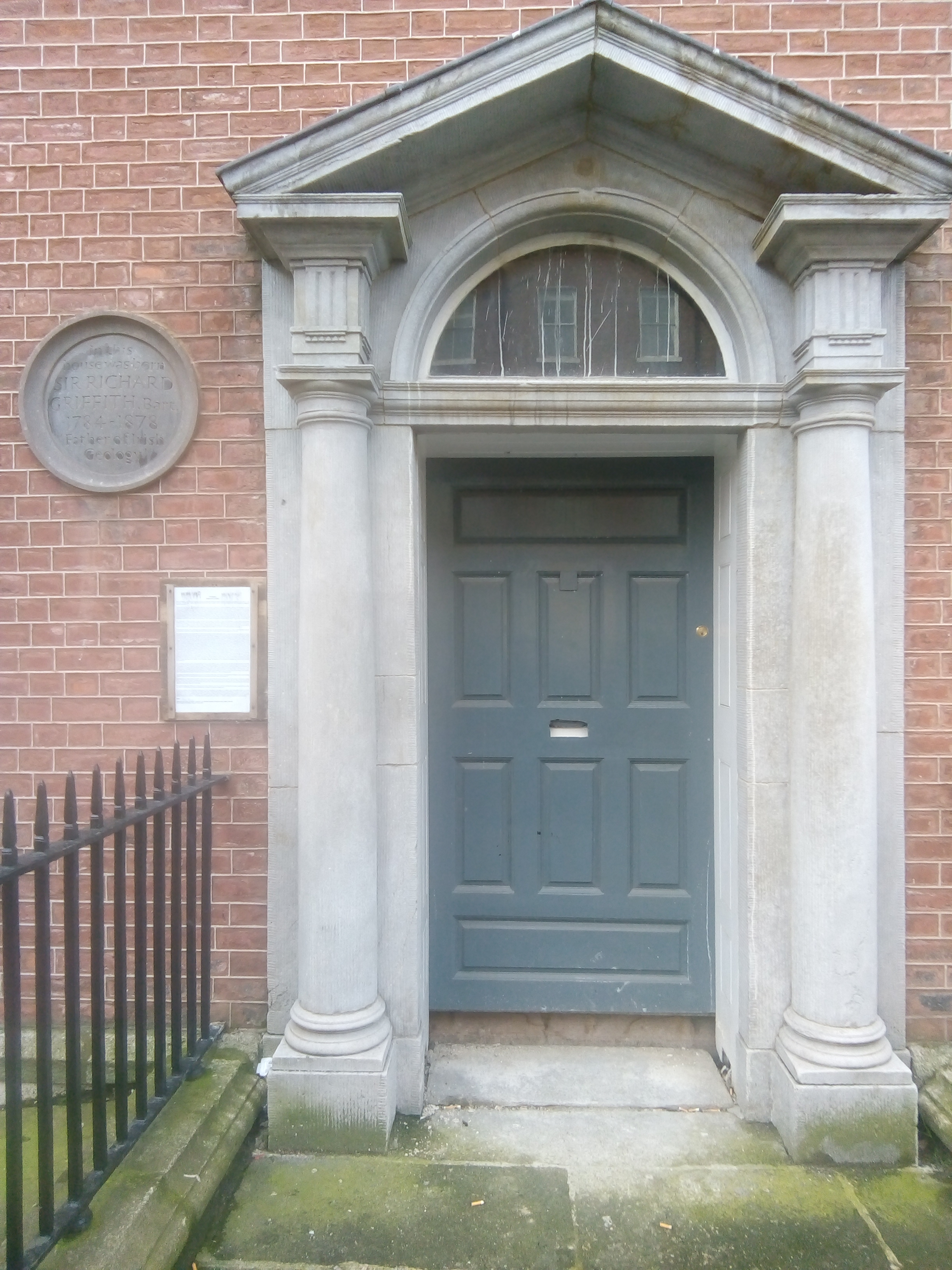
Plaque at Sir Richard's birthplace, calling him the "Father of Irish Geology."

Griffith was born in Hume Street, Dublin, Ireland on 20 September 1784, the son of Richard Griffith, MP of Millicent House, and Charity Yorke Bramston, daughter of John Bramston of Oundle. His paternal grandmother was the acclaimed actress, essayist and novelist, Elizabeth Griffith.

He went to school in Portarlington and later, while attending school in Rathangan, his school was attacked by the rebels during the rebellion of 1798. He also studied in Edinburgh.

In 1799 he obtained a commission in the Royal Irish Artillery, but a year later, when the corps was incorporated with that of Great Britain, he retired, and devoted his attention to civil engineering and mining. He studied chemistry, mineralogy and mining for two years in London under William Nicholson, and afterwards examined the mining districts in various parts of England, Wales and Scotland.

While in Cornwall he discovered ores of nickel and cobalt in material that had been rejected as worthless. He completed his studies under Robert Jameson and others at Edinburgh, was elected a Fellow of the Royal Society of Edinburgh in 1807, a member of the newly established Geological Society of London in 1808, and the same year, he returned to Ireland.

In 1809, he was appointed by the commissioners to inquire into the nature and extent of the bogs in Ireland, and the means of improving them. In 1812 he was elected Professor of Geology and Mining Engineer to the Royal Dublin Society. Shortly afterwards he expressed his intention of preparing a geological map of Ireland. During subsequent years he made many surveys and issued many reports on mineral districts in Ireland, and these formed the foundation of his first geological map of the country (1815). He also succeeded Dr. Richard Kirwan as government inspector of mines in Ireland. In 1822 Griffith became an engineer of public works in counties Cork, Kerry and Limerick, and was occupied until 1830 in repairing old roads and laying out many miles of new roads in some of the most inaccessible parts of the country.

Meanwhile, in 1825, he was appointed by the government to carry out a boundary survey of Ireland. He was to mark the boundaries of every county, barony, civil parish and townland in preparation for the first Ordnance Survey. He was also called upon to assist in the preparation of a parliamentary Bill to provide for the general valuation of Ireland. This Act was passed in 1826, and he was appointed Commissioner of Valuation in 1827, but did not start work until 1830 when the new 6" maps became available from the Ordnance Survey and which he was required to use as provided for by statute. He continued to work on this until 1868. On Griffith's valuation the various local and public assessments were made.

His extensive investigations furnished him with ample material for improving his geological map, and the second edition was published in 1835. The third edition on a larger scale (1 in. to 4 m.) was issued under the Board of Ordnance in 1839, and it was further revised in 1855. For this work and his other services to science, he was awarded the Wollaston medal by the Geological Society in 1854. In 1850 he was made chairman of the Irish Board of Works, and in 1858 he was created a baronet.

Griffith's geological maps included work by a number of his staff from the Valuation Survey. After research in the 20th century, it is now known that to a large extent the improvements of detail in the maps for which Griffith was praised and the geological research for Griffith's papers were due to Patrick Ganly, whose pioneering work went entirely uncredited by Griffith. Ganly also collected many of the fossils in the Griffith collection that were gifted to the Royal Dublin Society that are now in the National Museum of Ireland - Natural History, also in the Sedgwick Museum and Geological Museum of Trinity College Dublin. These were used as the basis for important publications by Irish palaeontologist Frederick McCoy who used them to establish over 500 new species of fossils.

He died at his residence, 2 Fitzwilliam Place in Dublin, on 22 September 1878 in his 95th year. At the time of his death, he was the oldest surviving fellow of the Geological Society of London and was the last survivor of the long-since disbanded Royal Irish Regiment of Artillery. He was buried alongside his wife, Maria Jane (née Waldie m. 21 Sep 1812) in Mount Jerome Cemetery, Harold's Cross, Dublin; on his grave is the epitaph: Not slothful in business, fervent in spirit, Serving the Lord.

== Family ==
In 1812 he married Maria Jane Waldie of Hendersyde Park in Kelso. They had one son, Sir George Richard Waldie-Griffith, 2nd Baronet.

== Arms ==
Coat of arms of Sir Richard Griffith, 1st Baronet
Notes Confirmed 9 February 1858 by Sir John Bernard Burke, Ulster King of Arms. These are the arms he used prior to being bestowed with a baronetcy. Crest On an antique crown Or a griffin segreant Gule charged on the shoulder with a trefoil Gold. Escutcheon Azure on a fess between three fusils voided Or a trefoil slipped Vert. Motto Jovis Omnia Plena

Coat of arms of Sir Richard Griffith of Munster Grillagh and Pencraig
Crest on a ducal coronet a griffin segreant Or, charged on the shoulder with a trefoil Vert Escutcheon Quarterly, 1st and 4th: Azure, on a fesse between three lozenges Argent, a trefoil slipped Vert (Griffith) ; 2nd and 3rd: Gules, a chevron Ermine, between three English men's heads in profile bearded Proper (Penrhyn). Motto Jovis omnia plena (All things are fulle of Jupiter's power)

== Publications ==
- Outline of the Geology of Ireland (1838)
- Notice respecting the Fossils of the Mountain Limestone of Ireland, as compared with those of Great Britain, and also with the Devonian System (1842)
- A Synopsis of the Characters of the Carboniferous Limestone Fossils of Ireland (1844) (with F McCoy)
- A Synopsis of the Silurian Fossils of Ireland (1846) (with F McCoy)

See memoirs in Quart. Journ. Geol. Soc. xxxv. 39; and Geol. Mag., 1878, p. 524, with bibliography.

Baronetage of the United Kingdom
New creation	Baronet (of Munster Grillagh and Pencraig); 1858–1878	Succeeded by George Waldie-Griffith
