= Bowls Queensland =

Australian governing body for lawn bowls

- Sport: Bowls
- Jurisdiction: Queensland
- Founded: 2005
- Affiliation: Bowls Australia
- President: Brian Marshall
- Vice president: Wendy Wilson

Official website
- www.bowlsqld.org
- (Australia)

Bowls Queensland (BQ) is the governing body for lawn bowls in Queensland, Australia.

== History ==
BQ in its current form has only existed since 2005. Previous to that, bowls in Queensland was governed by two separate organisations, the Royal Queensland Bowls Association (RQBA), established in 1903 and the Queensland Ladies Bowls Association (QLBA).

Queen Elizabeth II conferred the title "Royal" upon the Queensland Bowling Association in 1959, after which it became known as the Royal Queensland Bowls Association (RQBA). Bowls Queensland was formally established in 2004, with Gordon Baker serving as its first Chairman from 2004 to 2005, followed by Brian Stewart from 2006 to 2008. The organisation unified the previously separate men's and women's governing bodies, with the QLBA having its own list of Past Presidents dating back to 1930.

Currently, more than 26,000 Queenslanders are members of a BQ affiliated club.

== Structure ==
Bowls Queensland is governed by a Board of Directors, including a President, Vice President, Finance Director and 4 ordinary directors.

A number of supporting committees assist the board, currently including:

- Coaching
- Umpires
- Match
- Selection
- Junior

=== Strategic Plan ===
The current Bowls Queensland Strategic Plan is focused on these initiatives:

1. Increase funding
2. Stabilise and then grow membership using Annual Report figures
3. Lack of corporate governance and strategic planning programs for clubs and district
4. Regular training and education of Board, Committees and staff members
5. Succession planning for Board and Committees in BQ
6. Assist clubs to implement programs for local demographics
7. Implement new data base
8. Communication to bowlers
9. Ownership of Coorparoo

== Clubs ==
There are over 600 bowls clubs in Queensland, with more than 40,000 members all up. Each club is part of one of 20 district associations, which are divided into men's and women's equivalents.

Club Districts:

South East Queensland: Brisbane, Cunningham, Gateway, Gold Coast/Tweed Heads, Moreton Bay, Sunshine Coast

South West/Darling Downs: Condamine, Downs, Maranoa/Warrego, Southern Downs

Wide Bay-Burnett: Bundaberg, Burnett, Fraser Coast

Central Queensland: Central QLD, Leichardt, Port Curtis

Mackay, Isaac and Whitsunday: Mackay

North Queensland: North QLD, North West QLD

Far North Queensland: Tropical Far Nth

== Organisation ==
BQ is run by a board of directors. The board's chair, deputy chair and Director of Finance are elected annually by BQ's member districts. The four other directors are elected on a two-year rotational term, that sees two of the directors standing for election each year.

A number of committees assist the board, including:

- Men's
- Ladies
- Coaching
- Umpires
- Match
- Selection
- Sports Connect

== Events ==
=== Champion of Champions ===
The state Champion of Champions is an annual event run by BQ. Club champions in singles, pairs and fours compete against other champions in their district. Whoever wins the district competition, moves on to the state champion of champions. This year's champion of champions will be held at Bribie Island Bowls Club from 22 to 27 October 2011.

Previous winners include Mark Casey, Nathan Rice, Lynsey Armitage as well as a host of other Australian representatives.

Year	Singles	Club	Pairs	Club	Fours	Club
2001	Mark Spiller	The Summit	Peter Craven, Kris Lehfeldt	Kingscliff	Nathan Rice, Sean Roach, Mark Casey, Kelvin Kerkow	South Tweed
2002	Brian Baldwin	Musgrave Hill	Nathan Rice, Robert Thompson	South Tweed	Neil Frost, Damien Power, Brett Young, Elwyn Jeffs	Ferny Grove
2003	Colin Kelly	Far North Queensland	Brett Wilkie, Nathan Rice	Gold Coast	Ken Murray, Larry Pershouse, Royce Parker, Peter Pershouse	Bundaberg/Port Curtis
2004	Alex Murtagh	Brisbane North	Frank Vell, Steve Halmai	Gold Coast-Tweed	Ray Kurtz, Alan Howzrd, Paul Bailey, Ray Mackay	Mackay
2005	Darren Mullens	Hamilton	Ken Woodward, Alan Cullen	Algester	Tim Prendergast, John Abercrombie, Leon Thomas, Daryl Abercrombie	Townsville Suburban
2006	Chris Ryan	Greenslopes	Wayne Lyons, Roger Connolly	Ferny Grove	Rob Berlyn, Gerard Kerr, Pat Campbell, Garry Ryan	Stafford
2007	John Walker	Pialba	Dean McWhinney, Graeme Shillington	Tamborine Mountain	Devon Slater, John Fern, Ray O'Brien, Robert Dobinson	Ferny Grove
2008	Chris Gee	Mackay Northern Beaches	Noel Ryan, Greg Stanton	Dalby	Shaun Kelly, Waly Schmidt, Todd McIntosh, Joe Wood	Hamilton
2009	Sean Baker	Broadbeach	Peter Ward, Bill Mitilinios	Moorooka	Jason Andrewartha, Kevin Bell, Tim Smith, Darren McCracken	Tantitha
2010	Brett Wilkie	Club Helensvale	Jeff Twist, Ben Twist	Greenslopes	Jeff Watkins, Brett Clifford, Gary Thomas, Geoff Lanham	Broadbeach

==== Women's ====
Year	Singles	Club	Pairs	Club	Fours	Club
2004	Sue Brady	Mareeba Memorial	Theresa Pin, Sue Brady	Mareeba Memorial		
2005	Sue Brady	Mareeba Memorial	Gail Pratt, Clare Hall	Wynnum Manly	Jan Rohde, Brenda Carr, Sandra Landon, Fay Stapleton	Burleigh Heads
2006	Dalma McKelvie	Mackay Suburban	Alana Sharp, Evette Petherick	Springwood	Alison Ebsworth, patricia Marriees, Betty Bradley, Robyn Mullings	Tweed Heads
2007	Robyn Fisher	Cooloola Coast	Faye Clarke, Marilyn Peddell	Beachmere	Karen Locke, Marie Frahm, Venus Smith, Margaret Ragh	Warwick East
2008	Marilyn Peddell	Beachmere	Kerrie Wilson, Sue Bond	Ferny Grove	Marilyn Larsen, Mareen Phelan, Rose King, Judy Tognazzini	Pine Rivers
2009	Marilyn Peddell	Bribie Island	Robyn Tyson, Tracy Foster	Manly	Lyn Cuthbertson, Christine hawkins, Pamela Dearlove, Ann-Maree Hardey	Tweed Heads
2010	Lynsey Armitage	Club Helensvale	Dell Lehmann, Sonja Smits	Springwood	Patricia Reely, Teresa Armitage, Desiree Lambert, Lynsey Armitage	Club Helensvale

=== Junior Bowlers ===
Junior bowlers from across the state converge once a year for a week to compete in the Junior State Championships. The Junior State Championships divisions include U18 Boys Singles, U18 Girls Singles, Under 15 Boys Singles, Under 15 Girls Singles, Under 18 Open Pairs, Under 15 Open Pairs, Open Triples and Open Fours. The location of the competition is subject to change every year.

Locations Of Junior State Championships
Year	Location	Host Clubs
2021	Toowoomba	North Toowoomba Bowls Club Toowoomba Bowls Club
2020	Toowoomba	North Toowoomba Bowls Club Toowoomba Bowls Club
2019	Caloundra	The Waves Club
2018	Bundaberg	Burnett Bowls Club Inc.
2017	Caloundra	The Waves Club

=== Disabled Bowls ===
There are four divisions of disabled bowls in Queensland - blind, deaf, physical disabilities and intellectual disabilities. Bowls Queensland took over the organisation of the state disabled bowls championships in 2011. In this first year, BQ combined the previously separate competitions of Queensland Blind Bowlers Association, Deaf Bowlers, Lifestream (intellectual disabilities) and Sporting Wheelies (physical disabilities).

The winners of each section qualify for the disabled draw of the Australian bowls open.

== State Squads ==
The current state squads are listed below

=== Men ===
Name	Club
Jamie Anderson	Capalaba
Sean Baker	Broadbeach
Michael Breen	Pine Rivers Memorial
Mark Casey	Club Helensvale
Anthony Fantini	Club Helensvale
Lee Fitzhenry	Coolum Beach
Jason Grundon	North Toowoomba
Kelvin Kerkow	South Tweed
Anthony Kiepe	Club Helensvale
Mark Monro	Coolum Beach
Darren Mullens	Club Helensvale
Alex Murtagh	Pine Rivers Memorial
Nathan Rice	Club Helensvale
Mark Thatcher	Club Helensvale
Robert Wild	Pine Rivers Memorial
Brett Wilkie	Club Helensvale

=== Women ===
Name	Club
Lynsey Armitage	Club Helensvale
Jane Bush	Pacific Paradise
Faye Clarke	Pine Rivers
Gail Crompton	Burnett
Lyn Cuthbertson	Tweed Heads
Tracy Foster	Manly
Mary Geary	Caloundra
Maree Gibbs	Millmerran
Yvonne Lovelock	Musgrave Hill
Sue McKenzie	Tweed Heads
Christina Pavlov	Broadbeach
Marilyn Peddell	Coolum Beach
Ester Regan	Mackay Suburban
Maria Rigby	Manly
Gail Waitai	Broadbeach
Kerrie Wilson	Ferny Grove

=== Under 25's ===
==== Men ====
Name	Club
Des Cann	Jindalee
Jason Carpenter	Wynnum Manly Leagues
Scott Dejongh	Broadbeach
Scott McLachlan	Dean McWhinney
Dean McWhinney	Burleigh Heads
Jamie Nordlof	Wynnum Manly Leagues
Judd Percy	Salisbury
Paul Petersen	Broadbeach
Jamie Smith	Salisbury
Samuel White	Musgrave Hill

==== Women ====
Name	Club
Amanda Bessell	Wynnum Manly Leagues
Kristy DeWaard	Urangan
Shahn Griffiths	Pine Rivers
Amanda Haevecker	Club Helensvale
Charlie Harkness	Broadbeach
Lauren Ingham	McKenzie Park
Elizabeth McKillop	Pine Rivers
Pamela Rowe	Pine Rivers
Emma Watts	Beenleigh
Samantha Wilson	Pacific Paradise

=== Under 18's ===
==== Boys ====
Name	Club
Nathan Carpenter	Wynnum Manly Leagues
Kyle Franks	Burnett
Nick Gosley	Beenleigh
Sean Ingham	McKenzie Park
Braiden Leese	South Tweed
Joel Leese	South Tweed
Jacob Nelson	Cleveland
Ashley Schmidt	Urangan
Brendan Wilson	Tweed Heads
Rohan Wilson	Club Helensvale

==== Girls ====
Name	Club
Angela Earle	Wynnum Manly Leagues
Natasha Jones	Bribie Island
Rikki-Lee Kemp	Burnett
Bolivia Millerick	Burnett
Cassandra Millerick	Burnett
Jamie O'Brien	Maroochy Swan
Jessica Parolin	Aspley
Madison Styles	Marlin Coast
April Wilson	Club Helensvale
Lauren Wilson	Tweed Heads

== Australian Representatives ==
Queensland has supplied 26 men and 23 women to the Australian team since 1950. Lynsey Armitage, a current representative, was also named the first ever Australian bowls captain.

Here is a full list of Queenslanders who have played bowls for Australia, in order of selection

=== Men ===
- Robert Lewis (1950)
- Albert Palm (1950)
- Ronald Marshall (1958)
- Allan Rafton (1958)
- Keith Dwyer (1964)
- Edward Holden (1970)
- Alan Schulte (1970)
- Stan Coomber (1972)
- Keith Poole OAM (1974–85)
- Errol Stewart (1974)
- Clive White (1974)
- Bruno Panazzo (1978)
- Robbie Dobbins (1982)
- Robert Parrella (1982–94)
- Kevin Henricks (1986)
- Trevor Morris (1987–93)
- Steven Anderson (1990–2003)
- Kelvin Kerkow OAM (1995- )
- Bill Cornehls (2001–08)
- Mark Casey (2003-)
- Nathan Rice (2004- )
- Anthony Kiepe (2007- )
- Robbie Thompson (2008–09)
- Brett Wilkie (2009- )
- Sean Baker (2011 - )

=== Women ===
- Eileen Lowe (1967)
- Jean Turnbull (1969)
- Delcie McCollom (1981)
- Patricia Smith (1982–85)
- Menice Murray (1983)
- Phyllis Kelly (1985)
- Greeta Fahey (1986–89)
- Edda Bunutto (1987–92)
- Di Cunnington (1989)
- Maureen Hobbs (1990)
- Audrey Rutherford (1990–95)
- Maisie Flynn (1991)
- Dorothy Lergesner (1994)
- Judith Nash (1994–95)
- Marilyn Peddell (1996–2001)
- Jenny Harragon (1998–2004)
- Lynsey Armitage (2003- )
- Helen Bosisto (2003)
- Maria Rigby (2003–2006)
- Kelsey Cottrell (2005- )
- Ceri Ann Davies (2006–07)
- Noi Tucker (2006–07)
- Julie Keegan (2007- )
- Rebecca Quail (2011- )

== Hall of Famers ==
The first inductees into the Australian bowls Hall of Fame were announced in 2011.Five Queenslanders were inducted on this inaugural announcement.

- Robert Parrella OAM
- Keith Poole MBC
- Ian Schuback OAM
- Lynsey Armitage
- Kelvin Kerkow OAM

== Publication ==
BQ produces Queensland Bowler, a monthly publication free of charge to all Queensland bowls clubs. This magazine is also available on their website as a readable pdf.

== See also ==
- Bowls Australia
