= Canadian Cutting Horse Association =

Canadian non-profit organization

The Canadian Cutting Horse Association is a non-profit organization dedicated to promoting the equestrian sport of cutting in Canada. Founded in 1954, it regulates a sport that began in the mid-1880s and became popular in Canada in the 1940s and 1950s. The CCHA maintains a Hall of Fame to honour members who have made outstanding contributions to the sport. The CCHA's patron is Prince Philip, Duke of Edinburgh. Cutting is a sport based on ranchwork that began in the early 19th century, cutting cattle out of herds. Horses and riders are judged on how well they work to remove a single steer from a herd and keep it from returning. The CCHA promotes a type of horse called the Canadian cutting horse; this type is made up of many breeds with a common stock horse background.

== History ==
Cutting started (and still exists) as an activity on ranches in the early 19th century, used when individual cows needed to be removed from a herd. This was done by horses trained specifically for this purpose. Informal contests to judge the best cutting horses began in the mid-1880s, and the sport gained popularity through the early 20th century. The sport of cutting first became popular in Canada during the 1940s and 1950s. The Canadian Cutting Horse Association was formed in 1954, and the sport continue to garner increasing amounts of interest after this point. By 1961, $16,000 in prizes were offered at fifty-five contests across the nation. A similar organization in the United States in the National Cutting Horse Association.

In 1987, the CCHA opened its Hall of Fame with an initial induction ceremony honoring seven people. Since then, the Hall of Fame has grown to 19 members as of 2011. Inductees are honored for their long-time contributions to both the sport of cutting in Canada and the Association. Since 2008, the CCHA has hosted a Canadian National Championship in cutting, attended by the top Canadian riders in the sport.

== Competition ==
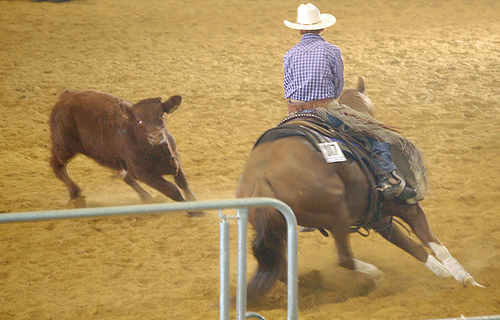
A horse working a cow after it was separated from the herd

The sport of cutting involves the working of cattle in a manner similar to that seen on ranches. However, some changes have been made from true ranch-style cutting to increase the entertainment value of the sport on a competitive level. During the event, each horse and rider pair takes one steer at a time from a herd in the arena. After cutting the animal from the herd, they move it to the other end of the arena and keep it from returning to the herd. The horse is trained to focus on the steer and respond to its every movement. If the cow gives up on returning to the herd, the rider can signal the horse to return to the herd and select another cow. Each horse and rider pair have two and a half minutes to demonstrate their skill at the sport, and during this time two or three cows are generally cut and worked, although the number may be as many or as few as the rider wishes.

After each session, the horse and rider are scored by judges based on the judgement and reactions of the horse and rider and the challenge presented by the steers selected. Points are deducted for letting a cow return to the herd or quitting a cow before it obviously loses interest in returning to the herd. As the horse is supposed to be making the judgements of which movements to use to keep the steer at the specified end of the arena, points are also lost if the rider obviously cues the horse or makes movements or noise toward the steer. More points are lost for separating more than one steer from the herd or pawing or biting at the cattle.

== Canadian cutting horse ==
The CCHA promotes a type of horse called the Canadian cutting horse, which includes all horses used for the sport of cutting in Canada. Most of these horses are members of the American Quarter Horse breed, although Thoroughbreds, Appaloosas and Paints are also used.
