= Royal Australasian College of Medical Administrators =

- Abbreviation: RACMA
- Formation: 1967
- Type: Specialist Medical College
- Legal status: Company Limited by Guarantee
- Headquarters: Melbourne
- Location: Australia, New Zealand
- Region served: Australia and New Zealand
- Members: Over 1,200
- Official language: English
- President: Professor Erwin Loh
- Website: https://racma.edu.au/

The Royal Australasian College of Medical Administrators (RACMA) is an accredited specialist medical college comprising medical practitioners with specialist training in management and leadership of health services and systems. Fellows of the college combine clinical knowledge, skill, and judgement and apply this at an organisation wide level. This may include administering or managing a hospital or other health service, or developing health operational policy, or planning or purchasing health services. The college is responsible for the training of medical professionals as specialist health leaders in Australia and New Zealand and has responsibility for assessing candidates and awarding the qualification of Fellowship of the college (FRACMA) to medical practitioners.

== About ==
The Royal Australasian College of Medical Administrators was founded in 1967 in response to the emergence of medical leadership as a specialty in its own right. There are currently more than 800 Fellows of the college made up of medical specialists from diverse positions in public hospital networks, government, and private organisations.

The college reports that its roles are:

- To set educational standards;
- Accredit educational programs;
- Organise a continuing education program for Fellows and Associate Fellows;
- Conduct examinations;
- Nurture, guide and encourage Candidates, Associate Fellows and Fellows; and
- Assist clinicians and public health personnel who are increasingly being required to manage their clinical departments and public health programs and in addition to providing a clinical service.

RACMA is a member, and current chair of the Steering Committee, of the World Federation of Medical Managers.

== History ==
The college formed as the Australian College of Medical Administrators (ACMA) on 21 March 1967 with 279 founding fellows. On 6 August 1979, royal assent was granted for use of the prefix 'Royal' to the Australian College of Medical Administrators. In 1998, the college formed links with New Zealand and the college was renamed to the current Royal Australasian College of Medical Administrators.

The college was formally recognised by the National Specialist Qualification Advisory Committee in 1980 as the appropriate examining body for the specialty of medical administration, rendering Fellowship a nationally recognised specialist medical qualification.

== Governance ==
The Royal Australasian College of Medical Administrators is a Company Limited by Guarantee governed under a constitution adopted in 2010. The College National office is located in Melbourne.

== Membership of the College ==
Candidates complete a three-year Fellowship to be admitted as a Fellow of the RACMA (FRACMA). Candidates undertake a master's degree in Health Management or Public Health. RACMA allows graduates of other medical specialty colleges to undertake a one-year Associate Fellowship to be admitted as an Associated Fellow of the RACMA (AFRACMA).

Trainees undertaking the Fellowship of the Australasian College for Emergency Medicine may undertake an elective rotation in a RACMA training post.

== Publications and Conference ==
The RACMA publishes:

- The Quarterly: The journal of The Royal Australasian College of Medical Administrators.
- A Strategic Plan details the RACMA's vision, purposes, values and ethical principles, and strategic and operational priorities for 2009–2011.
- Annual reports

The RACMA hosts an annual conference each year, inviting submissions on a chosen area of medical leadership and management.

== See also ==
- List of Specialist Medical Colleges
- List of Australian organisations with royal patronage
- World Federation of Medical Managers
