= Waldie-Griffith baronets =

Extinct baronetcy in the Baronetage of the United Kingdom

The Griffith, later Waldie-Griffith Baronetcy, of Munster Grillagh in the County of Londonderry and of Pencraig in the County of Anglesey, was a title in the Baronetage of the United Kingdom. It was created on 20 April 1858 for the Irish geologist and mining engineer Richard Griffith. The second Baronet assumed the additional surname of Waldie, which was that of his maternal grandfather. The title became extinct on the death of the third Baronet in 1933.

== Griffith, later Waldie-Griffith baronets, of Munster Grillagh and Pencraig (1858) ==
- Sir Richard John Griffith, 1st Baronet (1784–1878)
- Sir George Richard Waldie-Griffith, 2nd Baronet (1820–1889)
- Sir Richard John Waldie-Griffith, 3rd Baronet (1850–1933)

Coat of arms of Waldie-Griffith of Munster Grillagh and Pencraig
Notes No royal licence can be found, so these are standard quarterings, although 2 and 3 ought to be inverted per the laws of arms. Similarly, without a Royal Licence, they would not have a right to the Waldie crest. Crest 1st, on a ducal coronet a griffin segreant Or, charged on the shoulder with a trefoil Vert (Griffith) ; 2nd, a dove with an olive branch in its beak, all Proper, (Waldie). Escutcheon Quarterly, 1st and 4th: Azure, on a fesse between three lozenges Argent, a trefoil slipped Vert (Griffith) ; 2nd: Or, on a bend sinister Azure, a pelican vulning itself Proper between three leopards' faces Proper, two in chief and one in base (Waldie); 3rd: Gules, a chevron Ermine, between three English men's heads in profile bearded Proper (Penrhyn). Motto Jovis omnia plena (All things are fulle of Jupiter's power); Fidelis (faithful)
