= Bowls Australia =

Australian governing body for sport of bowls

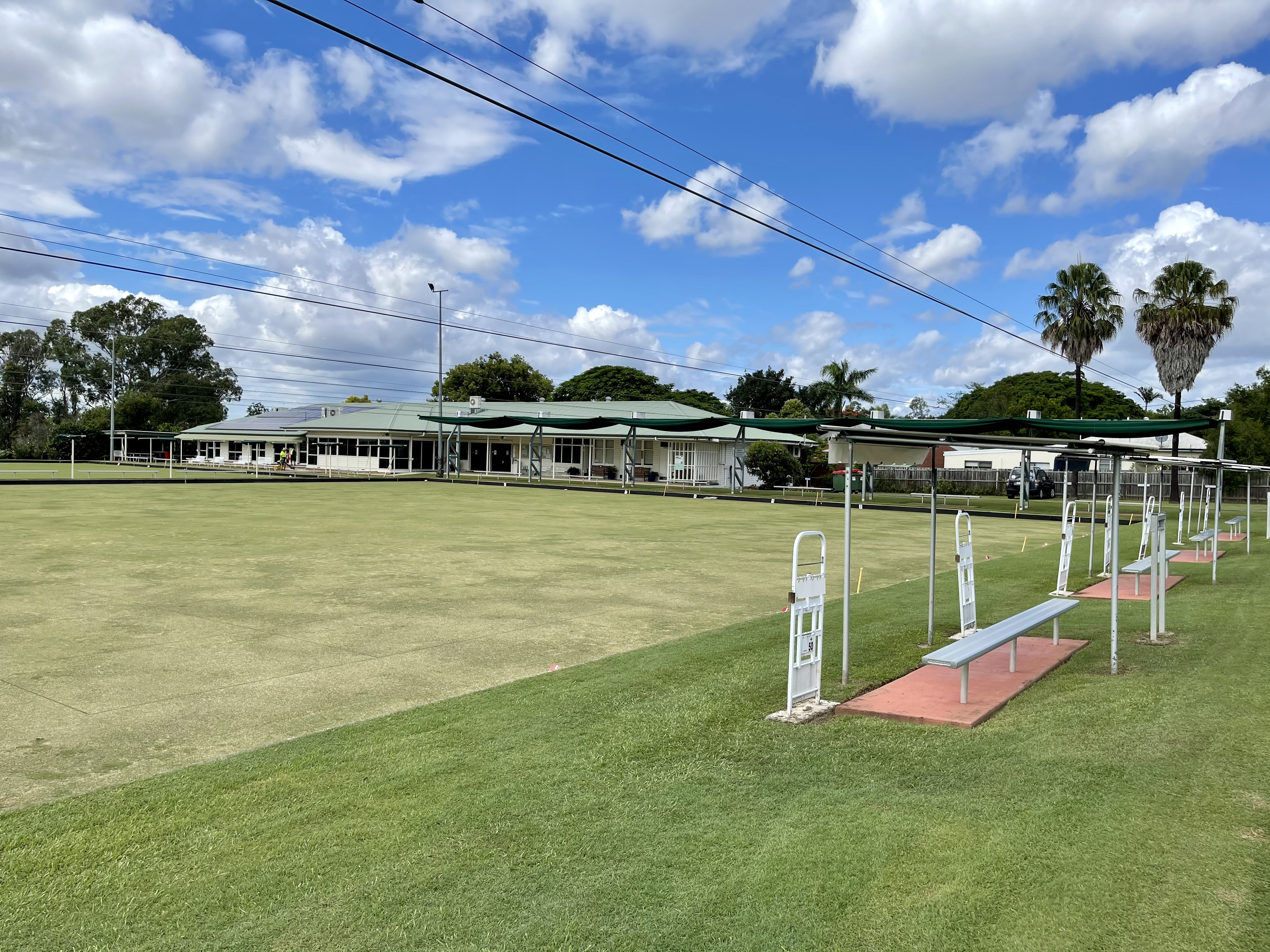
- Corinda Bowls Club in Corinda, Queensland

- Sport: Bowls
- Jurisdiction: Australia
- Founded: 1911
- Affiliation: World Bowls
- President: Bob Boorman
- CEO: Neil Dalrymple

Official website
- www.bowls.com.au
- (Australia)

Bowls Australia is the governing body for the sport of bowls in Australia. Bowls Australia is responsible for the leadership, development and management of lawn bowls in Australia. It is a not-for-profit organisation governed by a voluntary board that provides the strategic direction for the sport and the strategies that are implemented by the staff at the national office.

Bowls Australia's members are the six state and two territory bowls associations representing Australian Capital Territory, New South Wales, Northern Territory, Queensland, South Australia, Tasmania, Victoria and Western Australia.

There are over 2,000 clubs and 240,000 registered participants affiliated with member states and territories. In addition, there are many social bowlers participating in competitions across Australia.

Bowls Australia is affiliated with World Bowls and the Australian Commonwealth Games Association. It is a core sport in the Commonwealth Games, which are held every four years.

The Australian National Bowls Championships celebrated its centenary in 2013.

== History ==
In 1844, English immigrant Frederick Lipscombe constructed a bowling green behind his Beach Tavern in Sandy Bay, Hobart. The first recorded match was held on 1 January 1845 between Lipscombe and T. Burgess. Greens were then laid at Parramatta, Sydney and Melbourne, the latter seeing the first club formed in 1865, by an expatriate Scot John Campbell. Ten clubs met in 1867 to agree rules based on the Scottish Bowling Association. The NSW BA was founded on 22 May 1880, followed by Victoria just two months later and others followed (WA 1898), SA (1902) and Queensland (1903). The Imperial Bowling Association was formed in 1899 but a failed attempt to create a National Association took place in 1900.

On 22 September 1911, the Australian Bowling Council, was formed at conference of state delegates in Melbourne. The first Australian Championships under the new body were held in 1912, and the first Australian representative side played in New Zealand in 1914.

In 1928, the Australian Bowls Council became affiliated with the International Bowling Board, now known as World Bowls Inc.

The first World Bowls Championship was played at Kyeemagh Bowls Club in New South Wales in 1966.

== Structure ==
The national body has eight state member associations:

- Bowls Australian Capital Territory
- Bowls Queensland
- Bowls NSW
- Bowls Northern Territory
- Bowls Western Australia
- Bowls Victoria
- Bowls South Australia
- Bowls Tasmania

The main competitions Bowls Australia organises are the annual Australian Open (AO), Bowls Premier League (BPL) and BPL Cup. They also stage a number of other important national competitions, as well as hosting international events in Australia, including the World Bowls Championships.
