= Victorian Equal Opportunity and Human Rights Commission =

Statutory authority for the protection of human rights in Victoria

Agency overview
- Jurisdiction: Government of Victoria
- Headquarters: Level 3, 204 Lygon Street, Carlton, Victoria, Australia
- Website: www.humanrightscommission.vic.gov.au

The Victorian Equal Opportunity and Human Rights Commission is a statutory authority in the Australian state of Victoria.

== History ==
It replaced the Equal Opportunity Board, set up by Victorian Premier Dick Hamer in 1975.

It was reported by the media in April 2025, that Victorian state funding and budget cuts within the commission would potentially "create a system backlog of cases for years".

== Human Rights Oration ==
The organisation hosts an annual Human Rights Oration during Human Rights Week in December each year. Past speakers include:

- Julia Gillard AC (Dec 2020)
- Virginia Trioli (Dec 2019)
- Ben Law (Dec 2018)
- Megan Davis (June 2018)
- Graeme Innes AO (2016)
- Anita Heiss (2015)
- Gillian Triggs (2014)
- Geoffrey Robertson QC (2013)
- Ron Merkel QC (2012)
- Bernard Salt (2011)
- David Marr (2010)
- Muriel Bamblett (2009)
- Dan Adams (2008)
- Anne Summers AO (2007)
- Julian Burnside QC (2006)
- Andrew Demetriou (2005)
- Rhonda Galbally AO (2004)
- Lowitja O'Donoghue (2003)
- Eric Vadarlis (2002)
- Xanana Gusmão (2001)
