= Britton Chance Jr. =

American naval architect (1940–2012)

- Born: June 12, 1940; Philadelphia, Pennsylvania, US
- Died: October 12, 2012 (aged 72); Branford, Connecticut, US
- Other name: Britt Chance
- Education: University of Rochester; Episcopal Academy
- Occupation: Architect
- Awards: Barnegat Bay Sailing Hall of Fame
- Practice: Chance & Company
- Design: Chanceggar; Intrepid; Stars & Stripes 87; Stars & Stripes (US 1); Ondine IV

Britton Chance Jr. (June 12, 1940 – October 12, 2012) was an American naval architect who developed core elements of three yachts that won the America's Cup and won the World Championship six times. The New York Times said he "was known for having a mathematician's precision and a renegade's willingness to experiment". Professional Boatbuilder called him "one of the brightest minds in yacht design".

== Early life ==
Born in Philadelphia, Pennsylvania, Chance was the son of Jane Earle and Britton Chance, a biophysicist at the University of Pennsylvania who won a gold medal in sailing at the 1952 Summer Olympics. Raised in Mantoloking, New Jersey, he frequently sailed in Barnegat Bay and developed an early interest making boats that could go faster. Chance said, "I started racing and sailing at Manotoloking on my own by the time I was eight. My first boat was a Barnegat Bay Sneakbox—then I had a duckbox, Moth, and another sneakbox, penguins, and finally Class E scows."

In 1955, he started sailing in International 5.5 Meter competitions. In 1956, he came in second place in the East Coast Championship Penguin Regatta, junior division. In July 1957, he competed at the Barnegat Bay Yacht Race Association's Championship Regatta, winning the Atkinson Cup for his first-place finish with Complex II in the E Sloop class; he also came in first place in the Penguin class with Small Chance. Also in 1957, he won the South River Yacht Club Regatta.

Chance attended the Episcopal Academy near Philadelphia, Pennsylvania. When he was fifteen, he took the Westlawn Institute of Marine Technology's home-study course in ship design. He then attended the University of Rochester where he studied physics for three years. He also attended Columbia University where he studied mathematics. However, he never earned a degree.

== Sailing ==
Chance competed in both the America's Cup trials and the Olympic trials. In 1960, he participated in the 5.5-meter class Olympic trials with the ship Complex III and teammates Ed O'Malley and Runnie Colie, who was the captain. They "narrowly missed Olympic nomination".

In 1962, he was a crewman on the Easterner, a contender for America's Cup from the New York Yacht Club. That same year, he was part of the syndicate backing the Columbia as a contender in America's Cup trials.

In the summer of 1962, he was a crewman on the Columbia, preparing for the Olympic trials. In September 1962, he won first place twice in the Olympic trials for the 5.5-meter class. However, he did not make the team. In 1964, he came in second place overall in the 5.5 Meter Class Olympic trials while sailing a ship that he designed. He selected as an alternate helmsman for the 1964 Summer Olympics for the Dragon Class and 5.5 Meter Class.

In 1965, he was the captain of the Composition that won a race at the 5.5 Meter Class World Championship help in the Bay of Naples. In 1966, he also won a race the 5.5 Meter Class World Championship in Denmark, sailing the Chance.

In 1970, his father told Sports Illustrated, "He was a good skipper, but basically, he always wanted to know why the boat was going fast or slow and what he could do to make her go faster. He's been that way from the beginning."

== Career ==
During the summers while in college, Chance worked at towing tank or the ship model basin at the Stevens Institute of Technology in Hoboken, New Jersey. In the fall of 1960, he left college to apprentice as a draftsman with the boat designer C. Raymond Hunt and Fenwick Williams in Tilton, New Hampshire. In the spring of 1961, he apprenticed with Ted Hood, a boatbuilder, designer, and yachtsman located in Marblehead, Massachusetts. Hood had him working as a rigger, and also learning about sails and sail making. While with Hood, Chance supervised the towing tank tests on the Nefertiti, a 12-meter yacht created for the 1962 America's Cup. The test were conducted at the Stevens Institute. Chance is credited as both designer and assistant for the Nefetiti's America's Cup trials.

=== Chance & Company ===
However, he was mostly self-taught in naval architecture. In 1962, he opened Chance & Company in Oyster Bay, Long Island, above a Goodyear Tire Store, later moved to the third floor of his renovated whaling captain's house. His naval architectural firm designed craft in a wide range of sizes, from racing shells to America's Cup competitors. He also designed rowing skulls and 5.5-meter class sailboats that raced in the Olympics. Most of his yachts were built at the shipyard in Mamaronek, New York.

In 1962, he received his first commissioned design for a 5.5-meter sailboat. Next, he designed a 40-foot trimaran that had a hydraulically activated roller-furling/reefing gear, a rotating mast, and hulls made of epoxy resins, using unidirectional materials that were very advanced for that time. In 1964, the New York Yacht Club selected Chance to receive funds, organization, and testing through a new program "to ease the burden especially of young and promising designers".

By the late 1970s, he was also president of Chance Marine of Wilmette, Illinois. In 1979, he relocated Chance & Company to Essex, Connecticut.

=== IYRU's 3MKB trials ===
In 1965, Chance brought his new boat, Conqueror, to the IYRU's 3-Man-Keelboat (3MKB) trials in Kiel, Germany. Chance and Olympian George O'Day sailed the Conqueror, winning three of eleven races. The other eight races were won by the Shillalah, designed by Skip Etchells. Except for the Conqueror and the Shillalah, Etchells said, "None of the other boats factored in the racing." However, the IYRU Committee did not select a winner and called for additional trials, scheduled for Travemünde, Germany.

In August 1967, Chance took the Conqueror to Travemünde. There, he won three races, with the Shillalah II winning ten. This time, the Soling was selected as the new standard for the 3MKB. Etchells "thought it was hardly coincidental that neither his boat nor Britton Chance's had been mentioned, even though they had won all of the races for two years running."

=== Olympics ===
He designed State-6 and Charade, which placed first and third, respectively, at the first race of the 5.5 Meter Class Olympic trials in 1964. Canada used one of his 5.5-meter class designs for the 1964 Summer Olympics. In 1968, twelve of the seventeen entries in the 5.5 Meter Class US Olympic Trials were his designs. The United States used one of his designs for the 1968 Summer Olympics. His innovative 5.5-meter designs won gold and silver medals in the 1968 Olympics.

=== 1970 America's Cup ===
In 1969, Chance designed an America's Cup sailboat for yachtsman Ted Turner of Atlanta. However, that yacht was not built because its construction cost of $1 million was more than Turner's syndicate could afford.

In January 1970, French industrialist Baron Marcel Bich hired Chance to develop a twelve-meter "trial horse" for a French team from Yacht Club d'Hyères, which was preparing to challenge the Intrepid, the 1967 America's Cup winner. With access to Bich's fortune from Bic pens, Chance noted, "Economic limitations were imposed only by the cost-effectiveness studies that we made." Chance's design was built by Hermann Eggerin in Neuchâtel, Switzerland, starting in June 1970. Yet, he still called upon former associates in the United States—Ted Hood and Lowell North made the sails, Bob Derecktor in Mamaroneck made the mast, and Barient of California fabricated special winches. His engineering and use of new metals reduced weight. Another of his innovations for the French was to make the test yacht smaller so that it could be operated by a crew of ten, instead of the usual eleven. He also placed the helmsman more forward. When it was completed in August 1970, Bich chose the name Chancegger as a combination of the surnames of designer and maker. Louis Noverraz, a European racing skipper said, "Chancegger is fast—very fast—and very sensitive on the helm." However, the Chancegger could only be used to test innovations; the rules of America's Cup say, "The competing yacht and its components must originate in the country making the challenge."

Although he was criticized by some for working for a foreign team, Chance had not yet designed a 12-meter ship and wanted "to use the experience to help him build an even better boat for the United States. He said, "My own attitude is that if the French had won America's Cup, the New York Yacht Club could only have blamed itself for not ordering a new boat from me." In fact, Chance was hired by Bill Flicker, a member of the New York Yacht Club, as the lead designer to improve the Intrepid for the America's Cup trials. Before beginning his work on Intrepid, Chance formally ended his association with Bich's project.

Chance spent four months in Hoboken, New Jersey; he tank-tested 75 model hulls until he found "the winning design for Intrepid". He applied three materials that had not previously been used in commercial ship design—beryllium, boron, and carbon epoxy composites. Chance cut the weight of vital fitting by 65% by substituting beryllium on the top of the mast, boron graphite for the boom, and magnesium for the winches. He also added a small computer that gave true speed and a tape device that plots the yacht's course. Along with changes to the keel and stern, Chance increased the speed of Intrepid by 18%. He said, "Designing Chanceggar provided experience without which we couldn't have improved Intrepid as much as we have."

In June 1970, Time magazine noted, "Intrepid should probably be rechristened Son of Intrepid. Designer Britton Chance Jr., 29, has altered the 1967 cup winner so much that it is virtually a new boat." A rival designer said Chance "performed a hysterectomy on her keel". To everyone's surprise, except maybe Chance, the redesigned Intrepid beat the Valiant, the "early favorite", in America's Cup trials in August 1970. The Valiant was designed by Olin J. Stephens II, "the man who practically invented the 12-meter sloop", and had designed three America's Cup winners. The Intrepid also won the 1970 America's Cup.

Chance said, "Sure it was a triumph. I took an older boat and improved her." Sports Illustrated noted, "[Intrepid] has undergone major surgery below the waterline under the knife of a young pretender, Britton Chance Jr. Stephens ... would have to be inhuman if that knife has not pricked his pride." Stephens said, "I was disappointed to see Intrepid modified. She'd been successful and was a yardstick of our progress in 12-meter design. With her lines changed, we lost our benchmark."

=== 1974 and 1977 America's Cup ===
On April 22, 1971, Chance presented a paper, "Yacht Design: The State of the Art", to the American Philosophical Society. He spoke of the America's Cup and the "progress concerning ...the boundary layer, separation, and wave resistant theories in order to be able to predict analytically and to minimize, resistance without heel and sideforce". He noted, "This problem is most complex, however, and remains one of the most challenging problems in hydrodynamics and applied mathematics."

By 1974, he designed the swift ocean racers Equation and Ondine. That provided experience for Mariner, a new contender for the 1974 America's Cup with Ted Turner at the helm. Turner was an able captain, having been named US Yachtsman of the year two times. Chance "gave Mariner a radical shape behind the keel, a configuration of abrupt, startling angles." To perfect his design, he tested five-foot models in the tanks at Stevens Institute of Technology in Hoboken, New Jersey, for $1,200 a day, until he "had achieved a phenomenal hull". The Mariner's syndicate gave the ship to the United States Merchant Marine Academy, avoiding earlier financial problems by making contributions tax-deductible.

However, after the preliminary trials, Time magazine called Mariner an "iffy proposition" against Olin Stephens' Courageous and Intrepid; the latter essentially restored her to her 1967 lines by Stephens. Chance reluctantly agreed, pulling Mariner from the water to rebuild her hull. One reporter noted that Mariner syndicate members grumbled, while Chance sulked over this setback. The reporter wrote, "Naval architecture is not an exact science, alas. A whiz on the drawing board or in the testing tank may turn out to be a dog afloat."

Chance said he designed the fire-engine red Mariner because "I want a clear shot at Olin—the crunch, the confrontation." Chance's rivalry with Stephens was further agitated when the latter's older yacht Valiant was acquired by the Mariner syndicate. Chance again altered a Stephens design; this time as a trial horse. However, the Valiant returned to Newport for the trials as "a semi-serious contender" because of Chance's alterations.

Because of last-minute alterations, Mariner went into the final trials with virtually no testing. She unsuccessfully competed for a spot in the America's Cup. Stephen's Courageous won both the trial and the 1974 America's Cup.

For the America's Cup trials in 1977, Chance would again redesign the Intrepid. However, Ted Turner returned, winning both the trials and the 1977 America's Cup as the captain of the Courageous.

=== 1987 America's Cup ===
In the mid-1980s, American yachtsman Dennis Conner asked Chance to be part of his design team for the Sail America Foundation of San Diego Yacht Club. Chance used the Cray X-MP/48 supercomputer to create his design. He also consulted with scientists at Boeing, Grumman, and NASA to achieve the best results. Along with Bruce Nelson and David Pedrick, Chance brought three new designs to the team—the third, Stars & Stripes 87, won the 1987 America's Cup for the United States. Chance noted that pressure to win back the title for the United States was high; approximately 30 yachts were designed for the 1987 America's Cup with a combined cost of $100 million. He said, "This race to win the Cup was largely a contest of designers and technologies". President Ronald Reagan said, "The skill and determination of the Stars & Stripes team captured the imagination of the American people. They demonstrated the traits that have long characterized this country at its best—optimism, dedication, teamwork, and an eagerness to master the most advanced technology and put it to good use."

=== 1988 America's Cup ===
However, this victory was short-lived; a few months later, a New Zealand team issued a challenge with their 90-foot yacht KZ 1. Chance was again called upon to aid in the design of the defender. Headed by Chance, the American design team of Chance, Dave Hubbard, Duncan MacLane, John Marshall, Gino Morrelli, Bruce Nelson and Bernard Nivelt did not have enough time to create a monohull to match the challenger; instead they designed a catamaran, dubbed Stars & Stripes (US 1). Dennis Conner sailed this catamaran and retained the title in 1988 America's Cup.

=== Other boats ===
Some of his most successful boats were Boo, Ondine IV, Resolute Salmon, and Uhuru. Chance also designed production boats such as the PT-30-1 Plas Trend 30-1 (1968), PT-30-2 Plas Trend 30-2 (1970), Chance 30/30 Allied (1971), the Chance 37 Wauquiez (1971), the Chance 32/28 Paceship (1972), the Chance 32 (1972), the PT-32 Plas Trend 32 (1973), the Chance 24 (1973), the Chance 29/25 Paceship (1973), Joemarin 29 (1974), Offshore 1 Change (1976), the Golden Wave 48 (1981), Tartan Pride 270 (1985), and the Essex 14 (1986).

The Essex 14 was a 14-foot sailing dinghy made of fiberglass. The New York Times noted, "Her radical, wide, wing-shaped hull, her precise controls and her ability to change from a sloop rig with jib, mainsail, and spinnaker, to a cat-boat rig with mainsail alone, has brought her attention out of proportion to her size." The concept behind the $5,000 Essex 14 was to balance price with comfort and speed. Chance said, "What we were aiming for was a boat that would be a good trainer."

In 1984, he designed a new racing sloop for the new IOR One Ton category. He created the new boat from his previous designs for Vineta and Alethea I, and Alethea II. Chance said, "The combination of leading dimensions, rig, and stability chosen cannot be attained without state-of-the-art Kevlar/carbon epoxy composite or Unidirectional S-glass sandwich layups, so the design concept has only recently become possible."

=== Competition results ===
In addition to winning the Olympics in 1968 and America's Cup in 1970, 1987, and 1988, his sailboats won the 5.5 Meter World Championship in 1967, 1969, 1971, 1984, 1985, and 1987; as well as the 5.5 Meter Gold Cup 1969 through 1971 and in 1984. His one-tonners won the 1971 New York Yacht Club Astor Cup, the 1973 New York Yacht Club Una Cup, and the 1976 One Ton Cup.

His sailboats also won the Admiral's Cup, Cape to Rio Race, the Keil Regatta, the Marseilles Regatta, Newport Bermuda Race, St. Pete to Fort Lauderdale Race, Semaine de Geneve, Southern Ocean Racing Circuit, Sydney to Hobart Yacht Race, and Transpac (aka the Transpacific Yacht Race). His boats held course records at Fort Lauderdale Yacht Club, Key West Yacht Club, and Vineyard Haven Yacht Club.

=== Academics ===
Chance also taught naval architecture and engineering Trinity College, Wesleyan University, and at Yale University. In addition, he taught Computer-Aided Naval Architecture at the Center for Creative Imaging.

== Publications ==
Chance presented papers to the AIAA, the American Philosophical Society, and the Society of Naval Architects. A selection of his published works follows:

- "Yacht Design: The State of the Art". Proceedings of the American Philosophical Society. 115, no. 4 (December 30, 1971): 477–479
- "The Design and Performance of Twelve Meter Yachts". Proceedings of the American Philosophical Society 131, no. 4 (1987): 378–96.
- Chance, Britton Jr. "Narrow Equals Fast". Yachting. 178, no. 1, July 1995 P: 60.

== Honors ==
- Six days before his death, on October 6, 2012, Chance was inducted into the Barnegat Bay Sailing Hall of Fame by the Barnegat Bay Yacht Racing Association.
- The Mystic Seaport Museum in Mystic, Connecticut, maintains his papers in its collection.

== Legacy ==
Chance was "one of the biggest innovators" of racing crafts during the 1970s and 1980s. He created a retractable keel that reduced the drag on a boat. He also experimented with polymers, "improving the laminar flow along the bottom of the boat". He applied lifting-surface theories and slender body theories with "remarkable correlation with tank results". He worked with the Harken brothers and others to design the ultra-light hull of the Amoco Procyon in 1991. This futuristic boat modernized sailboats and revitalized a slumping industry. With the Intrepid, he applied materials new to the industry, reducing weight for those elements by as much as fifty percent.

In 1968, Chance began using computers to predict velocity and simulate hull performance. He reduced the time to produce a boat by as much as a month by working on a Tandy 2000 computer with yacht design software. He collaborated with Apple to develop CAD Naval Design software (MacSurf, now MAXSURF). This software could define the hull surface mathematically, which saved hours on calculations.

Chance also placed computers on board; he said their role was "supplementing the magnificent abilities of the sailors". Onboard computers displayed "time to start and lay lines, accurate to seconds; plots of wind data, allowing tacking in phase with the oscillatory winds ...; target speed numbers, approximate to conditions, at which the boat should be sailed; and semi-automated enemy range and bearing so that relative speed could be constantly gauged."

He also played a leading role in creating the International America's Cup Class (IACC) and its rules.

Chance said, "Art continues to have a place in design—for technology leaves many questions unanswered, or only partially answered. The designer must take available technology, his experience, his knowledge―his art―and integrate the conflicting requirements of ... design into a reality capable of sailing and winning in varied and unstable conditions. Art as personal expression is equally important ...for a small team can utilize state-of-the-art technology, compete at world levels, and make an artistic statement. The pleasure and pride of creation are involved in this, as are friendships forged with the technologists, builders, sailmakers, and sailors. These are the driving forces of a successful effort".

== Personal ==
On September 28, 1974, Chance married Dena Lynn Reichel in Huntington, Long Island. The couple met during the Newport to Bermuda race in the spring of 1974 when Dena was a cook on the Equation, a yacht designed by Chance. This was his second marriage, as his first marriage ended in divorce. They spent their honeymoon participating in the Middle Sea Race which followed Ulysses' route in the Mediterranean. This married also ended in divorce.

A resident of Lyme, Connecticut, Chance died from a stroke at the age of 72 in Branford, Connecticut, in 2012. He had one daughter, Tamsin.
