= 1970 in sports =

1970 in sports describes the year's events in world sport.

== Alpine skiing ==
- Alpine Skiing World Cup
  - Men's overall season champion – Karl Schranz, Austria
  - Women's overall season champion – Michèle Jacot, France

== American football ==
- 11 January – Super Bowl IV: the Kansas City Chiefs (AFL) won 23–7 over the Minnesota Vikings (NFL)
  - Location: Tulane Stadium
  - Attendance: 80,562
  - MVP: Len Dawson, QB (Kansas City)
- Cotton Bowl (1969 season):
  - The Texas Longhorns won 21–17 over the Notre Dame Fighting Irish to win the college football national championship
- 16 June – death of Brian Piccolo, Chicago Bears player
- 15 August – Patricia Palinkas becomes the first woman to play in a professional football game for the Orlando Panthers in the Atlantic Coast Football League.
- 3 September – death of Vince Lombardi, Green Bay Packers coach; subsequently, his name is given to the Super Bowl trophy and the Rotary Lombardi Award
- 2 October – The Wichita State University football team plane crash claims approximately half the football team when one of two planes crashes on the way to a game at Utah State University.
- 14 November – A plane carrying most of the Marshall University team crashes just short of landing near Huntington, West Virginia, killing all 75 aboard, including 37 players.

== Artistic gymnastics ==
- World Artistic Gymnastics Championships
  - Men's all-around champion: Eizo Kenmotsu, Japan
  - Women's all-around champion: Ludmilla Tourischeva, USSR
  - Men's team competition champion: Japan
  - Women's team competition champion: USSR

== Athletics ==
- 26 December – death from cancer of Lillian Board (22), British middle-distance runner
- July – 1970 Commonwealth Games held at Edinburgh
- December – 1970 Asian Games held at Bangkok

== Baseball ==
- 16 January – Gold Glove outfielder Curt Flood files a civil lawsuit challenging baseball's reserve clause, a suit that will have historic implications. Flood refused to report to the Phillies after he was traded by the Cardinals, contending the baseball rule violates federal antitrust laws.
- 17 January – The Sporting News names Willie Mays as Player of the Decade for the 1960s.
- 20 January – Lou Boudreau is elected to the Hall of Fame, receiving 232 of a possible 300 votes from the BBWAA.
- 7 April – The Milwaukee Brewers play their first ever game as the Brewers at Milwaukee County Stadium, after the team had relocated from Seattle.
- 12 June – Dock Ellis of the Pittsburgh Pirates throws a no-hitter against the San Diego Padres. It is later revealed that he did so while under the influence of LSD.
- Robert W. Peterson's book Only the Ball was White is published. The book brings pressure on Major League Baseball to recognize the African-American players from Negro league baseball by honoring its stars in the Baseball Hall of Fame.
- World Series – The American League's Baltimore Orioles win their second World Title by defeating the National League's Cincinnati Reds, 4 games to 1.

== Basketball ==
- NCAA Men's Division I Basketball Championship –
  - UCLA wins 80–69 over Jacksonville
- National Basketball Association –
  - New York Knicks won 4 games to 3 over the Los Angeles Lakers in the 1970 NBA Finals
- 1970 ABA Finals –
  - Indiana Pacers defeat Los Angeles Stars 4 games to 2
- FIBA World Championship –
  - Yugoslavia World Champion

== Boxing ==
- 15 February – Carlos Cruz, Featherweight Boxing Champion died in a plane crash
- 16 February – Joe Frazier wins the undisputed World Heavyweight title with the knock out of Jimmy Ellis in five rounds.
- 30 December – death of Sonny Liston (38), former heavyweight champion

== Canadian football ==
- Grey Cup – Montreal Alouettes win 23–10 over the Calgary Stampeders
- Vanier Cup – Manitoba Bisons win 38–11 over the Ottawa Gee-Gees

== Cricket ==
- 6 January – Australia commences a controversial tour of South Africa.
- 4 March – South Africa completes a 4–0 series whitewash over Australia at Port Elizabeth. This was to be South Africa's last Test match for 22 years.
- 22 May – The British Government forces England to cancel the planned tour of England by South Africa.
- A "Rest of the World" team captained by Garry Sobers plays five unofficial Test matches against England winning the series 4–1.
- In their centenary year Kent wins the English County Championship for the first time since 1913.
- The International Cricket Conference votes to suspend South Africa from international cricket indefinitely because of its government's apartheid policy.

== Cycling ==
- Giro d'Italia won by Eddy Merckx of Belgium
- Tour de France – Eddy Merckx of Belgium
- UCI Road World Championships – Men's road race – Jean-Pierre Monseré of Belgium

== Field hockey ==
- Men's European Nations Cup held in Brussels and won by West Germany

== Figure skating ==
- World Figure Skating Championships –
  - Men's champion: Tim Wood, United States
  - Ladies' champion: Gabrielle Seyfert, Germany
  - Pair skating champions: Irina Rodnina & Alexei Ulanov, Soviet Union
  - Ice dancing champions: Lyudmila Pakhomova & Alexandr Gorshkov, Soviet Union

== Golf ==
Men's professional

- Masters Tournament – Billy Casper
- U.S. Open – Tony Jacklin
- British Open – Jack Nicklaus
- PGA Championship – Dave Stockton
- PGA Tour money leader – Lee Trevino – $157,037

Men's amateur

- British Amateur – Michael Bonallack
- U.S. Amateur – Lanny Wadkins

Women's professional

- LPGA Championship – Shirley Englehorn
- U.S. Women's Open – Donna Caponi
- Titleholders Championship – not played
- LPGA Tour money leader – Kathy Whitworth – $30,235

== Harness racing ==
- Fresh Yankee was named "Horse of the Year" by the United States Trotting Association and the United States Harness Writers Association.
- Most Happy Fella won the United States Pacing Triple Crown races –
  1. Cane Pace – Most Happy Fella
  2. Little Brown Jug – Most Happy Fella
  3. Messenger Stakes – Most Happy Fella
- United States Trotting Triple Crown races –
  1. Hambletonian – Timothy T.
  2. Yonkers Trot – Victory Star
  3. Kentucky Futurity – Timothy T.
- Australian Inter Dominion Harness Racing Championship –
  - Pacers: Bold David

== Horse racing ==
- Nijinsky wins all three English Triple Crown Races and the Irish Derby

Steeplechases

- Cheltenham Gold Cup – L'Escargot
- Grand National – Gay Trip

Flat races

- Australia – Melbourne Cup won by Baghdad Note
- Canada – Queen's Plate won by Almoner
- France – Prix de l'Arc de Triomphe won by Sassafras
- Ireland – Irish Derby Stakes won by Nijinsky
- English Triple Crown Races:
  1. 2,000 Guineas Stakes – Nijinsky
  2. The Derby – Nijinsky
  3. St. Leger Stakes – Nijinsky
- United States Triple Crown Races:
  1. Kentucky Derby – Dust Commander
  2. Preakness Stakes – Personality
  3. Belmont Stakes – High Echelon

== Ice hockey ==
- Art Ross Trophy – Bobby Orr becomes the first defenseman in the history of the National Hockey League to lead the league in scoring.
- Hart Memorial Trophy for the NHL's Most Valuable Player: Bobby Orr, Boston Bruins
- Stanley Cup – Boston Bruins win the Cup for the first time in 29 years, defeating the St. Louis Blues four games to none. Defenseman, Bobby Orr is awarded the Conn Smythe Trophy as the series MVP (most valuable player).
- World Hockey Championship
  - Men's champion: Soviet Union defeated Sweden
- NCAA Men's Ice Hockey Championship – Cornell University Big Red defeat Clarkson University Golden Knights 6–4 in Lake Placid, New York; only NCAA hockey team to complete season undefeated and untied (31–0)

== Lacrosse ==
- STX is founded by Richard B.C. Tucker Sr.
- The New Westminster Salmonbellies win the Mann Cup.
- The Whitby Transporters win the Castrol Cup.
- The Lakeshore Maple Leafs win the Minto Cup.

== Rugby league ==
- 1970 Great Britain Lions tour
- 15 March – the final match of the 1969–70 European Championship is played, with England crowned champions for finishing on top of the league
- 19 September – the 1970 NSWRFL season culminates with South Sydney's 23–12 Grand Final victory over Manly-Warringah
- 8 November – the 1970 World Cup is won by Australia, who defeated Great Britain 12–7 in the final

== Snooker ==
- World Snooker Championship – Ray Reardon beats John Pulman 37–33

== Speed skating ==
- First ISU Sprint Speed Skating Championships for Men and Ladies held in West Allis, U.S.A.

== Swimming ==
- 22 August – US swimmer Mark Spitz breaks his own, nearly three-year-old world record in the men's 200m butterfly (long course) with a time of 2:05.4. At the same meet and on the same day in Los Angeles, California he loses it to Gary Hall Sr., who swims 2:05.0.

== Tennis ==
- Grand Slam in tennis men's results:
  1. Australian Open – Arthur Ashe
  2. French Open – Jan Kodeš
  3. Wimbledon championships – John Newcombe
  4. US Open – Ken Rosewall
- Margaret Court wins the Grand Slam in women's tennis –
  1. Australian Open – Margaret Court
  2. French Open – Margaret Court
  3. Wimbledon championships – Margaret Court
  4. US Open – Margaret Court
- Davis Cup – United States wins 5–0 over Germany F.R. in world tennis.

== Volleyball ==
- 1970 FIVB Men's World Championship held in Sofia and won by East Germany

== Yacht racing ==
- The New York Yacht Club retains the America's Cup as Intrepid defeats Australian challenger Gretel II, of the Royal Sydney Yacht Squadron, 4 races to 1.

== Multi-sport events ==
- Sixth Asian Games held in Bangkok, Thailand
- 1970 British Commonwealth Games held in Edinburgh, Scotland
- Central American and Caribbean Games held in Panama City, Panama
- Sixth Summer Universiade held in Turin, Italy
- Sixth Winter Universiade held in Rovaniemi, Finland

== Awards ==
- Associated Press Male Athlete of the Year – George Blanda, National Football League
- Associated Press Female Athlete of the Year – Chi Cheng, Track and field
