= Gretel II =

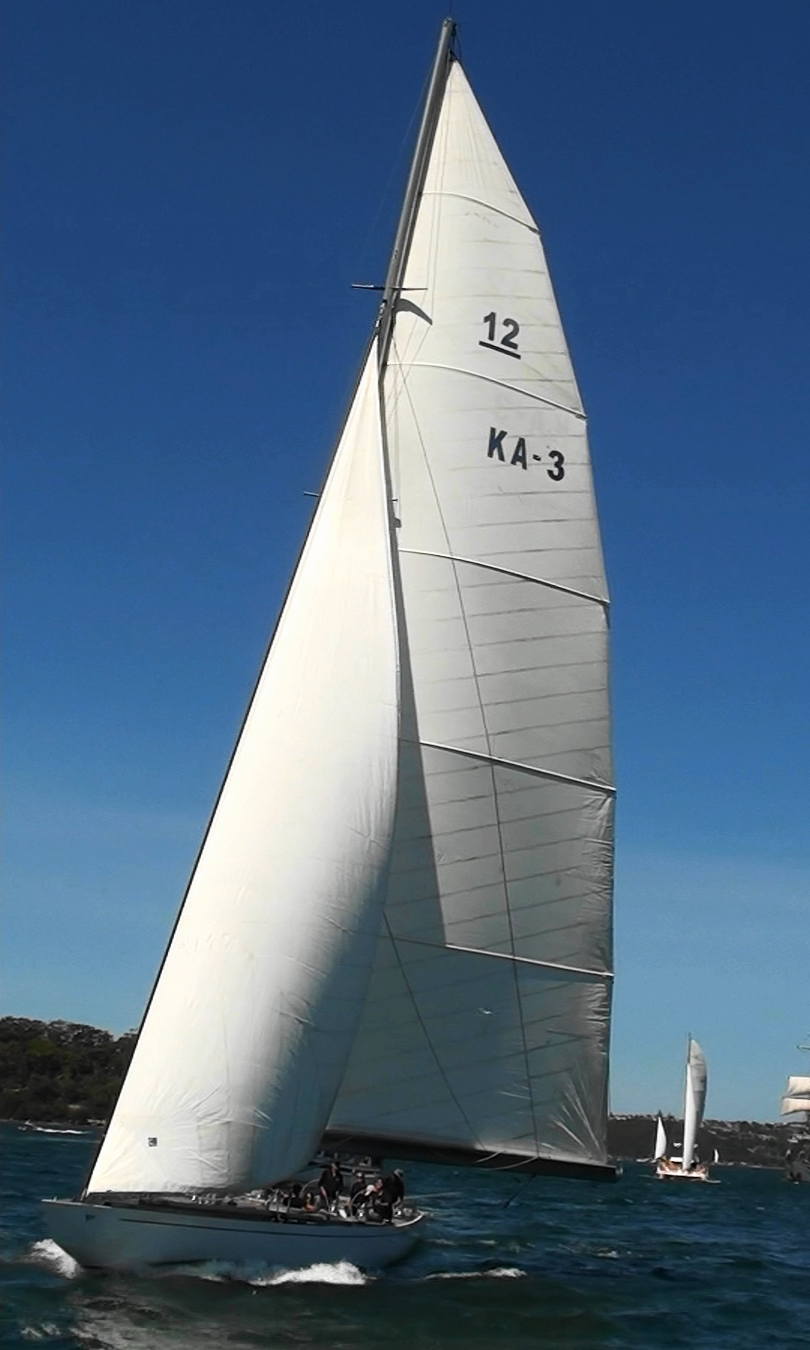
- Gretel II on Sydney Harbour in December 2015
- Yacht club: Royal Sydney Yacht Squadron
- Nation: Australia
- Class: 12 Metre
- Sail no: KA-3
- Designer(s): Alan Payne
- Builder: Bill Barnett
- Launched: 10 April 1970
- Owner(s): Frank Packer

Racing career
- Skippers: James Hardy; Gordon Ingate
- America's Cup: 1970; 1977

Specifications
- Displacement: 31.5 tonnes
- Length: 18.97 metres
- Beam: 3.72 metres
- Crew: John Anderson; John Bertrand; David Forbes

Gretel II is a 12 Metre yacht built for the 1970 America's Cup designed by Alan Payne and built by Bill Barnett for Frank Packer.

== 1970 America's Cup ==
Packer returned to Newport, Rhode Island to challenge for the 1970 America's Cup with his new 12 Metre yacht Gretel II representing the Royal Sydney Yacht Squadron. It was the last of the wooden-hulled America's Cup yachts. Gretel II was skippered by Jim Hardy with Martin Visser as tactician and starting helmsman and Bill Fesq as navigator. The crew included future Olympic Star class gold medallists John Anderson and David Forbes, and future America's Cup winning skipper John Bertrand as port trimmer.

After defeating Marcel Bich’s France in the challenger selection series 4–0, the Australian yacht took on the American defender Intrepid, skippered by Bill Ficker in a best-of-seven race series.

Intrepid won the first race when Gretel II's David Forbes was swept overboard but managed to hang onto the sail and scramble back on board. Then in a controversial second race, Gretel II crossed the finish line 1 minute 7 seconds ahead, but due to a collision at the start the Australian challenger was disqualified. Intrepid won the third race but Gretel II recorded a win in the fourth race by a margin of 1 minute 2 seconds. Intrepid then took out the fifth race to win the America's Cup 4–1.

Many observers, such as 1977 America's Cup winning skipper Ted Turner, believed that Gretel II was a faster boat than Intrepid but that the tactical cunning of Bill Ficker and Steve Van Dyke and the performance of the American crew were the deciding factors in the Americans' victory.

== 1977 America's Cup ==
Gretel II served as a trial horse for Alan Bond’s Southern Cross in the lead up to the 1974 America's Cup. In the 1977 America's Cup Gretel II, skippered by Gordon Ingate, was one of four yachts vying to challenge for the cup. Her wooden decking was replaced with aluminium for the new campaign. The yacht was eliminated by Swedish entrant Sverige during the challenger selection trials. The new Alan Bond yacht Australia won the right to challenge but lost to the Americans.

After a period with the Sydney Heritage Fleet, Gretel II was purchased by Michael Maxwell in 2005 and restored in New Zealand. As at 2020, it was berthed at the Royal Yacht Club of Tasmania.
