= 1967 in sports =

1967 in sports describes the year's events in world sport.

== Alpine skiing ==
- The first Alpine Skiing World Cup is organised for the three ski events: Downhill, Slalom and Giant Slalom:
  - Men's overall champion: Jean-Claude Killy, France
  - Women's overall champion: Nancy Greene, Canada

== American football ==
- January 15 − Super Bowl I: the Green Bay Packers (NFL) won 35−10 over the Kansas City Chiefs (AFL)
  - Location: Los Angeles Memorial Coliseum
  - Attendance: 61,946
  - MVP: Bart Starr, QB (Green Bay)
- December 31 – Green Bay Packers defeat Dallas Cowboys 21-17 for the 1967 NFL Championship in a now-legendary game at Lambeau Field known as the Ice Bowl to advance to Super Bowl II in Jan. 1968
- Oakland Raiders defeat the Houston Oilers 40-7 for the 1967 American Football League Championship to advance to Super Bowl II in Jan. 1968
- The New Orleans Saints are formed.

== Association football ==
=== European Cup ===
- Celtic win the European Cup Final 2–1 against Internazionale in Lisbon, earning the team the nickname of the Lisbon Lions. The team also won the Scottish League Championship and Scottish Cup and the Scottish league Cup Final, thus becoming the first team to complete a domestic and European quadruple.

=== England ===
- FA Cup final – Tottenham Hotspur 2-1 Chelsea

== Athletics ==
- August – Athletics at the 1967 Pan American Games held at Winnipeg

== Australian rules football ==
- Victorian Football League
  - Richmond wins the 71st VFL Premiership (Richmond 16.18 (114) d Geelong 15.15 (105))
  - Brownlow Medal awarded to Ross Smith (St Kilda)

== Bandy ==
- 1967 Bandy World Championship is held in Finland and won by Soviet Union.

== Baseball ==
- World Series – St. Louis Cardinals win 4 games to 3 over the Boston Red Sox. The series MVP is pitcher Bob Gibson of St. Louis.
- October – The Kansas City Athletics become the Oakland Athletics for the 1968 season.

== Basketball ==
- NCAA University Division basketball tournament –
  - UCLA wins 79–64 over Dayton. This would be the first of a record seven consecutive titles for the Bruins.
- NBA Finals –
  - Philadelphia 76ers won 4 games to 2 over the San Francisco Warriors.
- FIBA World Championship
  - Champions: USSR
- The American Basketball Association begins play as a rival league to the NBA.

== Boxing ==
- May 9 – Muhammad Ali was stripped of his World Heavyweight Champion titles and was banned from boxing by the various commissions for his refusal to be inducted into the United States Army.
- October 27 – death of Robert Carmody (29), American boxer, in the Vietnam War

== Canadian football ==
- Grey Cup – Hamilton Tiger-Cats won 24–1 over the Saskatchewan Roughriders
- Vanier Cup – Alberta Golden Bears win 10–9 over the McMaster Marauders

== Cycling ==
- July 13 — death of Tom Simpson during the stage 13 of Tour de France
- July 30 – death of Valentín Uriona (26), Spanish road racing cyclist, following a crash during a race
- Giro d'Italia won by Felice Gimondi of Italy
- Tour de France – Roger Pingeon of France
- UCI Road World Championships – Men's road race – Eddy Merckx of Belgium

== Field hockey ==
- Pan American Games (Men's Competition) in Winnipeg, Manitoba, Canada
  - Gold Medal: Argentina
  - Silver Medal: Trinidad & Tobago
  - Bronze Medal: United States
- March 11 – In an international women's field-hockey match at Wembley Stadium, England. England beat Ireland 7–1.

== Figure skating ==
- World Figure Skating Championships –
  - Men's champion: Emmerich Dänzer, Austria
  - Ladies' champion: Peggy Fleming, United States
  - Pair skating champions: Ludmila Belousova & Oleg Protopopov, Soviet Union
  - Ice dancing champions: Diane Towler & Bernard Ford, Great Britain

== Golf ==
Men's professional

- Masters Tournament – Gay Brewer
- U.S. Open – Jack Nicklaus
- British Open – Roberto DeVicenzo
- PGA Championship – Don January
- PGA Tour money leader – Jack Nicklaus – $188,998
- Ryder Cup – United States wins 23½ to 8½ over Britain in team golf.

Men's amateur

- British Amateur – Bob Dickson
- U.S. Amateur – Bob Dickson

Women's professional

- Women's Western Open – Kathy Whitworth
- LPGA Championship – Kathy Whitworth
- U.S. Women's Open – Catherine Lacoste
- Titleholders Championship – not played
- LPGA Tour money leader – Kathy Whitworth – $32,937

== Harness racing ==
- United States Pacing Triple Crown races –
  1. Cane Pace – Meadow Paige
  2. Little Brown Jug – Best Of All
  3. Messenger Stakes – Romulus Hanover
- United States Trotting Triple Crown races –
  1. Hambletonian – Speedy Streak
  2. Yonkers Trot – Speed Model
  3. Kentucky Futurity – Speed Model
- Australian Inter Dominion Harness Racing Championship –
  - Pacers: Binshaw

== Horse racing ==
Steeplechases

- Cheltenham Gold Cup – Woodland Venture
- Grand National – Foinavon

Flat races

- Australia – Melbourne Cup won by Red Handed
- Canada – Queen's Plate won by Jammed Lovely
- France – Prix de l'Arc de Triomphe won by Topyo
- Ireland – Irish Derby Stakes won by Ribocco
- English Triple Crown Races:
  1. 2,000 Guineas Stakes – Royal Palace
  2. The Derby – Royal Palace
  3. St. Leger Stakes – Ribocco
- United States Triple Crown Races:
  1. Kentucky Derby – Proud Clarion
  2. Preakness Stakes – Damascus
  3. Belmont Stakes – Damascus

== Ice hockey ==
- Art Ross Trophy as the NHL's leading scorer during the regular season: Stan Mikita, Chicago Black Hawks
- Hart Memorial Trophy – for the NHL's Most Valuable Player: Stan Mikita, Chicago Black Hawks
- Stanley Cup – Toronto Maple Leafs won 4 games to 2 over the Montreal Canadiens
- World Hockey Championship
  - Men's champion: Soviet Union defeated Sweden
- NCAA Men's Ice Hockey Championship – Cornell University Big Red defeat Boston University Terriers 4–1 in Syracuse, New York
- The NHL adds six new teams for the 1967–68 season.

== Lacrosse ==
- The inaugural World Lacrosse Championship is held in Toronto, Ontario. The United States win, and Australia is the runner-up.
- The Vancouver Carlings win the Mann Cup.
- The Elora Mohawks win the Castrol Cup.
- The Oshawa Green Gaels win the Minto Cup

== Radiosport ==
- Fifth Amateur Radio Direction Finding European Championship held in Cervena, Czechoslovakia.

== Rugby league ==
- 1967 New Zealand rugby league season
- 1967 NSWRFL season
- 1966–67 Northern Rugby Football League season / 1967–68 Northern Rugby Football League season
- 17 December – first Sunday play in professional rugby league.
- 1967–68 Kangaroo tour of Great Britain and France

== Rugby union ==
- 73rd Five Nations Championship series is won by France

== Snooker ==
- No World Snooker Championship challenge matches. John Pulman remains world champion

== Swimming ==
- July 26 – American swimmer Mark Spitz breaks Kevin Berry's nearly three-year-old world record in the men's 200m butterfly (long course) at the Pan American Games in Winnipeg, Manitoba, with a time of 2:06.4.
- August 30 – John Ferris captures the world record from fellow-American Mark Spitz in the men's 200m butterfly (long course) by swimming 2:06.0 at a meet in Tokyo, Japan.
- October 8 – Mark Spitz regains his world record in the men's 200m butterfly (long course) at a meet in West Berlin, West Germany, clocking 2:05.7.

== Tennis ==
Australia

- Australian Men's Singles Championship – Roy Emerson (Australia) defeats Arthur Ashe (USA) 6–4, 6–1, 6–4
- Australian Women's Singles Championship – Nancy Richey (USA) defeats Lesley Turner Bowrey (Australia) 6–1, 6–4

England

- Wimbledon Men's Singles Championship – John Newcombe (Australia) defeats Wilhelm Bungert (West Germany) 6–3, 6–1, 6–1
- Wimbledon Women's Singles Championship – Billie Jean King (USA) defeats Ann Haydon-Jones (Great Britain) 6–3, 6–4

France

- French Men's Singles Championship – Roy Emerson (Australia) defeats Tony Roche (Australia) 6–1, 6–4, 2–6, 6–2
- French Women's Singles Championship – Françoise Dürr (France) defeats Lesley Turner (Australia) 4–6, 6–3, 6–4

USA

- American Men's Singles Championship – John Newcombe (Australia) defeats Clark Graebner (USA) 6–4, 6–4, 8–6
- American Women's Singles Championship – Billie Jean King (USA) defeats Ann Haydon Jones (Great Britain) 11–9, 6–4

Davis Cup

- 1967 Davis Cup – Australia 4–1 Spain at Milton Courts (grass) Brisbane, Australia

== Volleyball ==
- 1967 Men's European Volleyball Championship won by the USSR
- 1967 Women's European Volleyball Championship won by the USSR
- Volleyball at the 1967 Pan American Games won by USA (both men's and women's tournaments)

== Water sports ==
- January 4 – death of Donald Campbell (45), British land and water speed record holder, who was trying to extend the record on Coniston Water, Cumbria

== Yacht racing ==
- The New York Yacht Club retains the America's Cup as Intrepid defeats Australian challenger Dame Pattie, of the Royal Sydney Yacht Squadron, 4 races to 1

== Multi-sport events ==
- Fifth Pan American Games held in Winnipeg, Canada
- Fifth Mediterranean Games held in Tunis, Tunisia
- Fifth Summer Universiade held in Tokyo, Japan

== Awards ==
- Associated Press Male Athlete of the Year – Carl Yastrzemski, Major League Baseball
- Associated Press Female Athlete of the Year – Billie Jean King, Tennis
