= Gordon Ingate =

Australian sailor (1926–2026)

Gordon Ingate OAM
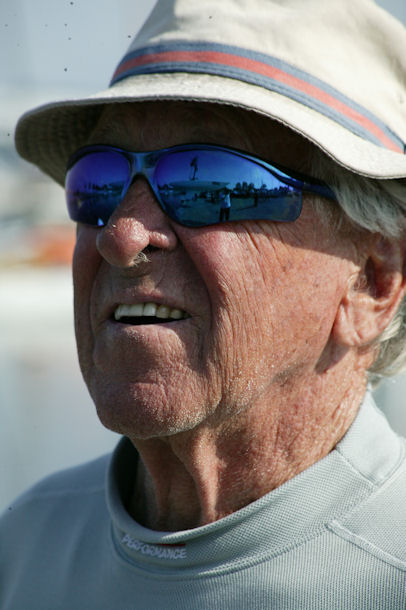
- Ingate in 2008

Personal information
- Born: Gordon Wilson Ingate; 29 March 1926 Sydney, New South Wales, Australia
- Died: 24 April 2026 (aged 100)

Sailing career
- Country: (Australia)
- Sport: Sailing
- Events: 1972 Summer Olympics, 1977 America's Cup, Sydney to Hobart Yacht Race

Gordon Wilson Ingate (29 March 1926 – 24 April 2026) was an Australian sailor who competed in the 1972 Summer Olympics, sailing in the Tempest class keelboat.

== Biography ==
Gordon Wilson Ingate was born in Sydney, New South Wales on 29 March 1926. He came second after U.S. America's Cup sailor Ted Turner, who was skippering a 12-metre converted American Eagle when competing in the 1972 Sydney to Hobart Yacht Race, skippering yacht Caprice of Huon.

He skippered 12-Metre Gretel II in the 1977 America's Cup but was eliminated by Sweden in the challengers' trials.

Ingate received the Australian Sports Medal in 2000 and the Medal of the Order of Australia (OAM) in the 2016 Birthday Honours, for service to sailing.

At the age of 91, Ingate won the Prince Philip Cup/Australian Dragon Class Championship at the Metung Yacht Club in Victoria, held between 7 and 13 January 2018, racing his yacht Whimsical with crew Amy Walsh and David Giles.

In 2020, he received a Lifetime Achievement Award from Australian Sailing.

Ingate was a longstanding member of the Royal Sydney Yacht Squadron and the New York Yacht Club. On 29 March 2026 he turned 100 years old.

Ingate died on 24 April 2026, at the age of 100.
