= 1974 America's Cup =

22nd America's Cup
Defender United States
- Defender club: New York Yacht Club
- Yacht: Courageous

Challenger Australia
- Challenger club: Royal Perth Yacht Club
- Yacht: Southern Cross

Competition
- Location: Newport, Rhode Island, United States
- Dates: 10–17 September 1974
- Rule: 12-metre
- Winner: New York Yacht Club
- Score: 4–0

The 1974 America's Cup was held in September 1974 at Newport, Rhode Island. The US defender, Courageous, skippered by Ted Hood, defeated the Australian challenger, Southern Cross, skippered by James Hardy, in a four-race sweep.

Courageous had beaten Intrepid (skippered by Gerry Driscoll and including William Earl Buchan and John Marshall), Heritage, Mariner and Valiant (skippered by George R. Hinman Sr.) to become the defender. Southern Cross had beaten France to become the challenger. Hood had replaced Robert Bavier as skipper of Courageous during the defender trials.

1977 Cup winner Ted Turner first sailed at the 1974 Cup, losing at the defender trials while skippering aboard Mariner. Dennis Conner started the trials as the tactician on Mariner, before being promoted to helm the boat, and then being added to the afterguard of Courageous. Olin Stephens and Halsey Chase Herreshoff also sailed in the afterguard of Courageous.
