= Intrepid (yacht) =

Racing yacht

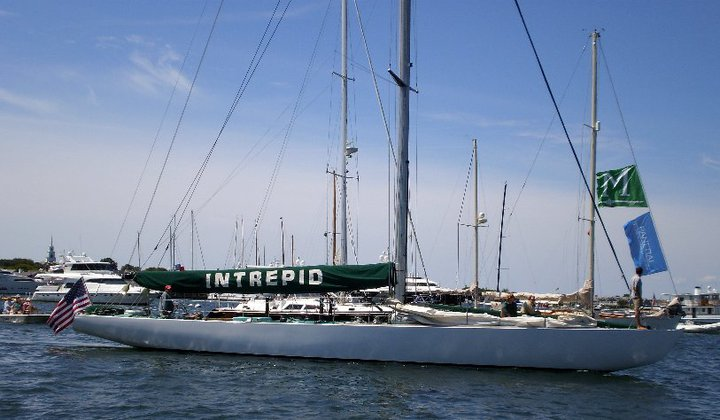
- Intrepid moored in Nantucket Harbor during Nantucket Race Week 2010
- Yacht club: New York Yacht Club
- Nation: United States
- Class: 12-metre
- Sail no: US–22
- Designer(s): Olin Stephens; Britton Chance, Jr. (re-design)
- Owner(s): W. J. Strawbridge syndicate

Racing career
- Skippers: Emil Mosbacher, Jr. (1967); Bill Ficker (1970); Gerry Driscoll (1974)
- Notable victories: 1967 America's Cup; 1970 America's Cup
- America's Cup: 1967; 1970

Intrepid is a 12-metre class racing yacht which won the America's Cup in 1967 and again in 1970.

== Design ==
Intrepid was designed by Olin Stephens, and was built of double-planked mahogany on white oak frames. She featured important innovations both above and below the waterline. The rudder was separated from the keel and a trim tab was added. This new general underbody type, with relatively minor refinements, was used on every subsequent Cup boat until the 12-metre Australia II's winged keel of 1983. Above decks, Intrepid featured a very low boom, made possible by locating the winches below decks. The low boom caused an "end-plate effect", which allows a smaller amount of air to circulate around the boom and making the lower part of mainsail more efficient. The success of Intrepid was also the cause of some completely new technical features such as separate keel and a rudder to become popular in many production yachts such as Swan 36.

== America's Cup ==
In 1967 Intrepid was skippered by Emil "Bus" Mosbacher, and defeated Australian challenger Dame Pattie. Redesigned in 1970 by Britton Chance, Jr. and skippered by Bill Ficker that year, she defeated another Australian challenger, Gretel II.

Intrepid remained competitive even against aluminum 12-metre yachts. Redesigned again, this time by her original designer Olin Stephens, Intrepid was back again for a third time in 1974, skippered by Gerry Driscoll. Intrepid came within one race of becoming the only three-time America's Cup defender in history, but lost the final race of the defender trials to Courageous, which would go on to win the Cup that year with Ted Hood at the helm. Ted Hood sold Courageous to Ted Turner who went on to win the 1977 America's Cup with her.

== Restoration ==
Intrepid underwent a two-year structural restoration, the bustle area was reframed, the bottom replanked for several feet up from the keel, and the deck and deck beams were replaced. Today Intrepid is available for charter out of Newport, Rhode Island along with fellow America's Cup winner Weatherly as well as 12mRs Heritage, and American Eagle.
