= John Gerald Driscoll III =

Personal information
- Full name: John Gerald Driscoll III
- Born: 1924
- Died: March 12, 2011 (aged 86–87)
Medal record
Gold medal – first place	1944 Lake Michigan	Star class

John Gerald "Gerry" Driscoll III (1924 – March 12, 2011) was an international yachting champion and businessman from San Diego, California. He competed in the defense portion of four America's Cup races (1964, 1967, 1970, and 1974), and was part of the organizational effort for two others. His innovative year-round training regimen for the 1974 race permanently changed the way teams prepare for the America's Cup. As a competitor, organizer, ambassador and businessman, he is credited with helping to put San Diego on the sailing map internationally, and as one of the first San Diegans to compete in the America's Cup races, he raised the profile of the America's Cup on the West Coast.

== Sailing career ==
=== America's Cup ===
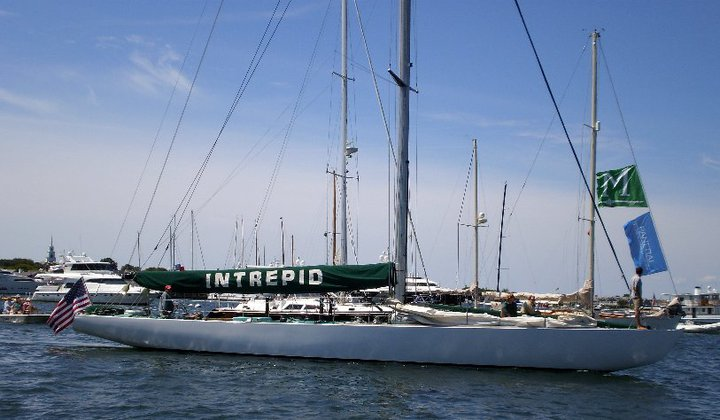
Intrepid in 2010.

In 1964, he skippered the trial horse Vim in the America's Cup defense qualifying races. In 1967 he was the project manager and skipper of Columbia, the first America's Cup entry from the West Coast. In 1970 he served as tactician on the defense candidate Valiant.

It was in 1974 that he "changed forever how the (America's Cup) event was sailed." At that time the standard America's Cup calendar was that the boats were built the winter before the event, and crew training began four or five months before the actual races. But Driscoll trained and drilled his crew throughout the winter in the calm waters off San Diego, while his rivals were all in dry dock. His boat Intrepid came close to winning the defender competition that year, but lost to Courageous in the final race due to a broken backstay. His year-round training program became the standard for future America's Cup efforts.

He was also the general manager for the challenger Eagle in the 1986–87 race, and helped San Diego Yacht Club organize the 1992 races.

=== Other sailing ===
- He won the international Star championship in 1944.
- He won the Lipton Cup three times, in 1959, 1960, and 1970.
- He won the match race Congressional Cup in two consecutive years, 1965 and 1966, during which time his record was 18 and 0.

He was inducted into the San Diego Hall of Champions in 1977.

He was named San Diego Yachtsman of the Year in 1966 and 1974.

== Business ==
He and his brother Harlan founded a boat yard in 1947. Driscoll Boat Works eventually became a major presence in the Southern California marine industry including a number of yacht construction, repair, and maintenance facilities in San Diego Bay and Mission Bay, as well as yacht brokerages and Driscoll's Wharf and Marina.

== Community ==
He led the modernization of the Juniors program at San Diego Yacht Club. He also founded the San Diego Yachting Cup, one of San Diego's top annual sailing events.

== Personal life ==
Driscoll was a seventh-generation Californian. One of his maternal ancestors was a soldier who accompanied Father Junípero Serra, founder of the system of California missions.

A longtime San Diego resident, he had seven children. He died in his La Jolla home on March 12, 2011.

== Achievements ==
As of 28 September 2015

Year	Competition	Venue	Position	Event
1944	Star World Championship	Lake Michigan, USA	1st	Star class
