= 1958 Star World Championship =

Event title
- Edition: 36th
- Host: San Diego Yacht Club

Event details
- Venue: San Diego, United States
- Dates: 18–23 August 1958
- Yachts: Star
- Titles: 1

Competitors
- Competitors: 48
- Competing nations: 6

Results
- (gold) Gold: (United States) Ficker & Yorston
- (silver) Silver: (United States) Rollins & Pickford
- (bronze) Bronze: (United States) Schoonmaker & Burnham

The 1958 Star World Championship was held in San Diego, United States, 18–23 August 1958. The hosting yacht club was San Diego Yacht Club. William P. Ficker, of Newport Harbor, and Mark Yorston won the championship.

== Results ==
Results of individual races
Pos	Boat name	Crew	Country	I	II	III	IV	V	Tot
Gold medal	Nhycusa	William P. Ficker; Mark Yorston	United States	1	2	1	3	10	108
Silver medal	Perseverance	Chick Rollins; William Pickford	United States	4	5	3	1	12	100
Bronze medal	Dingo	Ding Schoonmaker; Malin Burnham	United States	6	3	11	6	1	98
4	Glider	Richard Stearns; Gary Comer	United States	2	8	7	8	5	95
5	North Star III	Lowell North; James Hill	United States	WDR	4	2	2	3	89
6	Kurush V	Carlos de Cárdenas; Jorge de Cárdenas	Cuba	5	10	10	4	7	89
7	Star of the Sea	Joseph R. Duplin; Ross Sherbrooke	United States	3	1	4	22	9	86
8	Lindoya	Charles W. Lyon Jr. Frank Lyon	United States	15	9	8	7	2	84
9	Frolic	Bill Buchan Jr. Bill Buchan Sr.	United States	12	6	5	14	6	82
10	Flame	Stan Ogilvy; Francis Welch	United States	7	14	9	5	13	77
11	Rio Pimm	Walter von Hütschler; Jim Reynolds	Brazil	10	15	12	9	8	71
12	Vice	W. Bennett; Robert Halperin	United States	8	11	WDR	12	14	55
13	Shrew	William Parks; Bud Wenzel	United States	WDR	7	DSQ	10	4	54
14	Music II	P. Schoonmaker; Chris Sawyer	United States	11	19	14	15	15	51
15	Good Grief	Tom Blackaller; Al Nelson	United States	9	17	13	WDR	11	50
16	Creepy II	Foster Clarke; Roy Cole	Bahamas	14	16	6	16	DNF	48
17	Desiree	Cy Gillette; R . O. Mahan	United States	17	21	17	11	18	41
18	Warrior	Frank McCarthy; Frank Rollins	United States	DNF	13	DSQ	13	16	33
19	Wahoo	Barton S. Beek; Seymour Beek	United States	13	18	DNF	19	17	33
20	Waterwitch	Harry C. Uhler; Herbert Jordan	United States	16	22	15	21	19	32
21	Nausikaa	Carlos Braniff; Javier Belazquez	Mexico	18	20	16	20	21	30
22	Dangerous	Daniel Hubers; Paul Smart	United States	DSA	12	WDR	17	20	26
23	Espuma del Mar	Daniel Camejo; Peter Camejo	Venezuela	19	23	18	18	22	25
24	Whispering Wind	F. Bulloch Jr. J. M. Jordan	United States	DNF	DNS	DNS	DNS	DNS	0

Legend: DNF – Did not finish; DSA – Disabled; DSQ – Disqualified; WDR – Withdrew;
