= Southern Cross (yacht) =

- Yacht club: Royal Perth Yacht Club
- Nation: Australia
- Class: 12 Metre
- Sail no: KA-4
- Designer(s): Ben Lexcen

Racing career
- America's Cup: 1974

Southern Cross is a 12 Metre yacht. It was designed by Ben Lexcen and constructed in Terrey Hills by Halvorsen Morson and Gowland of Mona Vale the 1974 America's Cup. It was the first aluminium yacht to compete in the America's Cup.

== Career ==
=== America's Cup ===
Although unsuccessful in beating the Americans in the 1974 America's Cup, Southern Cross did beat the competing nations to win the right to challenge for the cup.

=== Today ===
Southern Cross provides chartered overnight sailing trips in the Whitsunday Islands. The conversion of Southern Cross to a charter yacht took two years and included construction of a toilet and shower, beds, kitchen/galley and dining area. The deck was modified to include two cockpits and a motor was fitted.
