= 1967 America's Cup =

20th America's Cup
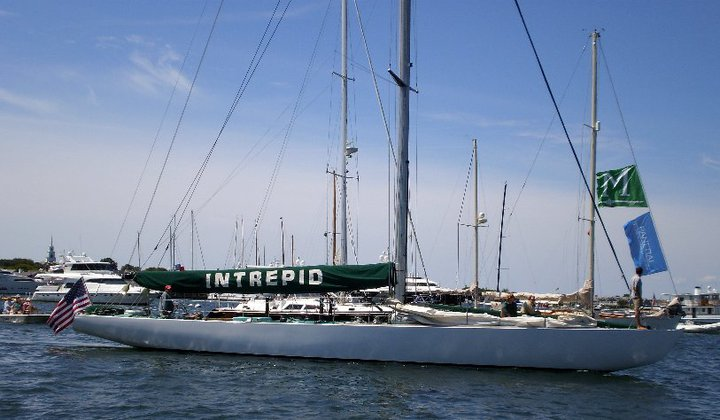
- Intrepid moored in Nantucket Harbor during Nantucket Race Week 2010

Defender United States
- Defender club: New York Yacht Club
- Yacht: Intrepid

Challenger Australia
- Challenger club: Royal Sydney Yacht Squadron
- Yacht: Dame Pattie

Competition
- Location: Newport, Rhode Island, United States
- Dates: September 1967
- Rule: 12-metre
- Winner: New York Yacht Club
- Score: 4–0

The 1967 America's Cup was held in September 1967 at Newport, Rhode Island. The US defender, Intrepid, skippered by Bus Mosbacher, defeated the Australian challenger, Dame Pattie, skippered by Jock Sturrock, four races to zero.

Intrepid had beaten Columbia and American Eagle to become the defender.
