= Dame Pattie =

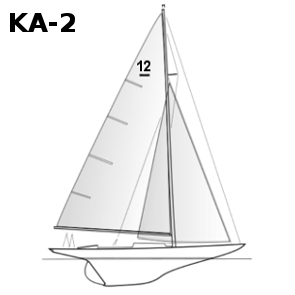
- Yacht club: Royal Sydney Yacht Squadron
- Nation: Australia
- Class: 12 Metre
- Sail no: KA-2
- Designer(s): Warwick Hood
- Builder: Bill Barnett
- Launched: August 1966
- Owner(s): Emil Christensen Syndicate; Mads Buhl (2008–)

Racing career
- Skippers: Jock Sturrock
- America's Cup: 1967

Dame Pattie is a 12 Metre yacht built for the 1967 America's Cup. She was designed by Warwick Hood and built by Bill Barnett in Sydney, Australia.

The 1967 challenge cost $2 million and was funded by an Australian syndicate headed by Emil Christensen, and represented the Royal Sydney Yacht Squadron.

The yacht was named after Dame Pattie Menzies.

== Construction ==
Built by Bill Barnett in Sydney, Dame Pattie was launched in August 1966. The yacht's main frames are laminated Queensland Maple, intermediate frames are steambent Danish Ash, to which edgegrain Douglas Fir planking is fastened with silicon bronze screws. Due to the restrictions on use of equipment and materials sourced from outside the defenders country, the Australian syndicate had to obtain permission from the New York Yacht Club to buy the edge grain fir from Stone Brothers Logging, Maple Bay, Vancouver Island, British Columbia.

Dame Pattie subsequently underwent a major refit which included a full reconstruction below decks to provide cabins, galley etc. required for cruising. She was for some years used for private charters out of Vancouver Island.

In 2008 Dame Pattie was purchased by the Danish architect Mads Buhl, who brought the Yacht to the French Riviera, where she is still sailing as well as being prepared for future participation in Regattas within the classic 12 Metre fleet.
