= Robert W. Peterson (writer) =

American writer (1925–2007)

Robert W. Peterson (December 19, 1925 – February 11, 2006) was an American newspaper writer who later became a freelance author of magazine articles and books, especially on the topics of sports and Scouting.

== Biography ==
Peterson was born in 1925 in Warren, Pennsylvania. He played baseball while attending Upsala College, and later was a writer and editor with the New York World-Telegram newspaper, which folded in 1966.

Peterson's 1970 chronicle of Negro league baseball entitled Only the Ball Was White was hailed by The New York Times as having "recaptured a lost era in baseball history and a rich facet of black life in America". The baseball commissioner at the time, Bowie Kuhn, later credited Peterson's book with having "focused greater attention on the accomplishments of Negro League players", leading to their admission to the Baseball Hall of Fame.

Peterson's book The Boy Scouts: An American Adventure was published in 1984 on the eve of the 75th anniversary of the Boy Scouts of America (BSA). In it, he discusses the history of Scouting's various programs, such as the founding of the Order of the Arrow by E. Urner Goodman, and the influence Ernest Thompson Seton's successful use of American Indian culture in his Woodcraft Indians program had on Scouting's early development, particularly the Order of the Arrow. Peterson also wrote numerous articles for Scouting magazine in the 1970s–1990s, such as a tribute to William Hillcourt in 1985, acclaiming the influential BSA leader as "the foremost influence on development of the Boy Scouting program". He subsequently wrote another article for Scouter magazine about Hillcourt in 2001. Among the articles Peterson penned for the BSA's Scouting magazine was an account of Scouting activities in the Japanese-American internment camps during World War II.

Peterson died of lung cancer on February 11, 2006, in Salisbury, Pennsylvania, survived by his wife Peggy and a son and daughter. At the time of his death, he was on a committee selecting Negro league players for the Hall of Fame.

== Bibliography ==
Petersons' published books include:

- Only the Ball Was White, 1970. ISBN 0-19-507637-0
- Rhodesian independence, 1971. ISBN 0-87196-184-9
- Agnew: the coining of a household word, 1972. ISBN 0-87196-225-X
- Space: from Gemini to the moon & beyond, 1972. ISBN 0-87196-157-1
- Crime & the American response, 1973. ISBN 0-87196-227-6
- South Africa & apartheid, 1975. ISBN 0-87196-186-5
- The Boy Scouts: An American Adventure, (American Heritage Press, 1985) ISBN 0-8281-1173-1
- Cages to Jump Shots: Pro Basketball's Early Years (Oxford University Press, 1990)
- Pigskin: The Early Years of Pro Football (Oxford University Press, 1996) ISBN 978-0195076073
