= 1970 America's Cup =

21st America's Cup
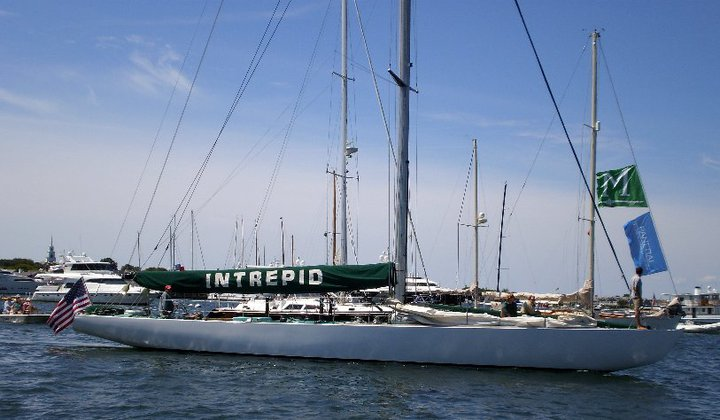
- Intrepid moored in Nantucket Harbor during Nantucket Race Week 2010

Defender United States
- Defender club: New York Yacht Club
- Yacht: Intrepid

Challenger Australia
- Challenger club: Royal Sydney Yacht Squadron
- Yacht: Gretel II

Competition
- Location: Newport, Rhode Island, United States
- Dates: September 1970
- Rule: 12-metre
- Winner: New York Yacht Club
- Score: 4–1

The 1970 America's Cup was held in September 1970 at Newport, Rhode Island. The US defender, Intrepid, skippered by Bill Ficker, defeated the Australian challenger, Gretel II, skippered by James Hardy, four races to one.

Intrepid had beaten Heritage and Valiant to become the defender. (1962 winner Weatherly also participated in the trials, providing a fourth boat so racing could proceed more uniformly.) Gretel II had beaten France to become the challenger.
