= James Hardy (sailor) =

Australian businessman and sports sailor (1932–2023)

Sir James Hardy AO OBE
- Born: James Gilbert Hardy; 20 November 1932; Seacliff, South Australia, Australia
- Died: 14 June 2023 (aged 90); Adelaide, South Australia, Australia
- Occupations: Winemaker, businessman, sailor

Sir James Gilbert Hardy AO OBE (20 November 1932 – 14 June 2023) was an Australian winemaker and businessman who was also noted for his yachting achievements.

== Early life and education ==
A great-grandson of the South Australian winemaker Thomas Hardy, James Hardy was born at Seacliff, South Australia on 20 November 1932.

His father, Tom Mayfield Hardy, who was appointed chairman and managing director of Thomas Hardy and Sons in 1924, was one of those killed near Mount Dandenong on 25 October 1938 in the crash of the plane "Kyeema". Tom Hardy was a noted sailor, associated with the yacht Nerida at the Royal South Australian Yacht Squadron.

Hardy was educated at Brighton Primary School, St Peter's College and the South Australian Institute of Technology. On leaving school, he spent two years share farming at Port Vincent, South Australia, then joined the family wine company Thomas Hardy and Sons in 1953, working as a shipping clerk. He then served as Sales Supervisor from 1957 to 1961, then as Regional Director for the Eastern States of Australia, when he and his family moved permanently to Sydney with a residence at Manly. He was appointed chairman in 1981 and non-executive director in 1992 when it merged to become BRL Hardy Wine Company.

== Yachting ==
A renowned world champion yachtsman, Hardy represented Australia at two Olympic Games (1964 in Tokyo and 1968 in Mexico City), skippered three America's Cup challenges (in 1970, 1974 and 1980), and competed in four Admiral's Cup Ocean Racing Championships.

== Public service ==
Hardy served 25 years on the executive committee of the Neurosurgical Research Foundation of South Australia. He was Chair of the Federal Government's Natural Heritage Trust Advisory Committee for 8 years. Hardy also served as Chairman of the Landcare Foundation.

== Personal life and death ==
When National Service commenced in 1951, Hardy was in the first intake at the Woodside Army Camp.

Hardy married Anne Christine Jackson on 29 December 1956. They had two sons, David Ponder Hardy and Richard James Hardy.

In 1989, Hardy was interviewed by Caroline Jones on her Radio National program, The Search for Meaning.

Hardy died on 14 June 2023, at the age of 90. He was survived by his second wife, Joan (née McInnes), his sons and sister.

== Freemasonry ==
Hardy was an active Freemason and was initiated into the Lodge City of Sydney No. 952 in 1962. He then served as Worshipful Master of his mother lodge in 1971. In 1976, he was appointed Deputy Grand Master of the United Grand Lodge of New South Wales and the Australian Capital Territory, an office he served for two years.

Lodge Sir James Hardy No. 1046, on the register of the United Grand Lodge of New South Wales and the Australian Capital Territory is named after Hardy in his honour. The lodge was consecrated on 21 May 2011 and Hardy still maintained active membership in the lodge.

== Honours ==
In the 1975 Birthday Honours, in recognition of his contribution to sailing and the community, he was appointed an Officer of the Order of the British Empire (OBE) for services to sport and the community.

In the 1981 Birthday Honours he was invested as a Knight Bachelor by Queen Elizabeth II, for services to yachting.

In 1994, Hardy was inducted into the America's Cup Hall of Fame.

In 2000, he was awarded the Australian Sports Medal.

Hardy was Chairman of Sydney's Australia Day Regatta, serving from 2004 until 2011, and was a patron of numerous organizations and charities.

Hardy also has a street named after him in the South Australian suburb of Woodcroft.

He was posthumously appointed an Officer of the Order of Australia (AO) in the 2024 King's Birthday Honours.
