= Courageous (yacht) =

12-metre class yacht

- Yacht club: New York Yacht Club
- Nation: United States
- Class: 12-metre
- Sail no: US–26
- Designer(s): Olin J. Stephens & David Pedrick
- Builder: Minneford's Yacht Yards; City Island, New York, USA
- Launched: June 1974
- Owner(s): Courageous Syndicate (1974); King's Point Fund, Inc. (1977)

Racing career
- Skippers: Ted Hood (1974); Ted Turner (1977)
- Notable victories: 1974 America's Cup; 1977 America's Cup
- America's Cup: 1974; 1977

Specifications
- Displacement: 25.450 metric tons
- Length: 20.10 m (65.9 ft) (LOA); 13.60 m (44.6 ft) (LWL)
- Beam: 3.73 m (12.2 ft)
- Draft: 2.73 m (9.0 ft)
- Crew: Crew of 11

Courageous is a 12-metre class racing yacht. It was the third boat to win the America's Cup twice, in 1974 and 1977, after Columbia in 1899 and 1901, and Intrepid in 1967 and 1970. All three yachts were fielded by the New York Yacht Club. The Olin J. Stephens-designed sloop was the first all aluminum-hulled 12-metre class yacht.

== History ==
Courageous successfully defended the America's Cup in 1974 for the US with Ted Hood at the helm. After the 1974 cup, Hood built a new boat, Independence, which he thought was faster than Courageous, and sold Courageous to Ted Turner. Turner won the 1977 America's Cup defender trials in Courageous, beating Hood in the process, and then went on to successfully defend the America's Cup against Australia later that year.

When preparing Courageous for the 1977 America's Cup, it was re-measured for compliance with the 12-metre class rule. It was discovered that Courageous was lighter than the weight declared in its original racing certificate for the 1974 America's Cup. Less weight typically means a faster performance in lighter winds and a slower performance in stronger winds. If Courageous had been found to be under weight before the competition in 1974, then the designers would have had to make adjustments to sail area, the waterline length, or other attributes to make the design comply with the 12-metre rule. If Courageous was found to be underweight during the event, it would have been disqualified. It is unknown what effect this oversight had on the result of the 1974 event.

=== Today ===
Both Courageous and Intrepid are still sailing and racing today in Newport, Rhode Island. Intrepid is available for charter and Courageous is privately owned.

== See also ==
- List of winners at America's Cup
