= William P. Ficker =

William P. "Bill" Ficker was an American sailor in the Star class. He won the 1958 Star World Championship together with Mark Yorston and finished third in the 1959 edition. Subsequently, Ficker was the skipper of the successful 1970 America's Cup defender Intrepid.

Ficker was inducted into the National Sailing Hall of Fame in 2016.
