= 1977 America's Cup =

23rd America's Cup
Defender United States
- Defender club: New York Yacht Club
- Yacht: Courageous

Challenger Australia
- Challenger club: Sun City Yacht Club
- Yacht: Australia

Competition
- Location: Newport, Rhode Island, United States
- Dates: 13–18 September 1977
- Rule: 12-metre
- Winner: New York Yacht Club
- Score: 4–0

The 1977 America's Cup was held in September 1977 at Newport, Rhode Island. The US defender, Courageous, skippered by Ted Turner, defeated the Australian challenger, Australia, skippered by Noel Robins, in a four-race sweep. Courageous' greatest winning margin out of all four races was 2 minutes and 23 seconds. It was the second unsuccessful challenge by Alan Bond.

Courageous had beaten Lowell North's Enterprise and Ted Hood's Independence to become the defender. Australia had beaten France, Gretel II and Sverige to become the challenger.

This was Ted Turner's second try at a Cup, losing out at the defender trials at the 1974 Cup. His crew included tactician Gary Jobson. Enterprise had included Malin Burnham, Halsey Herreshoff and John Marshall.

== Results ==
Team	13 September 1977	16 September 1977	17 September 1977	18 September 1977	Pts
(United States) Courageous	W	W	W	W	4
Australia	+1:48	+1:03	+2:33	+2:25	0
