= Ted Turner =

American media mogul (1938–2026)

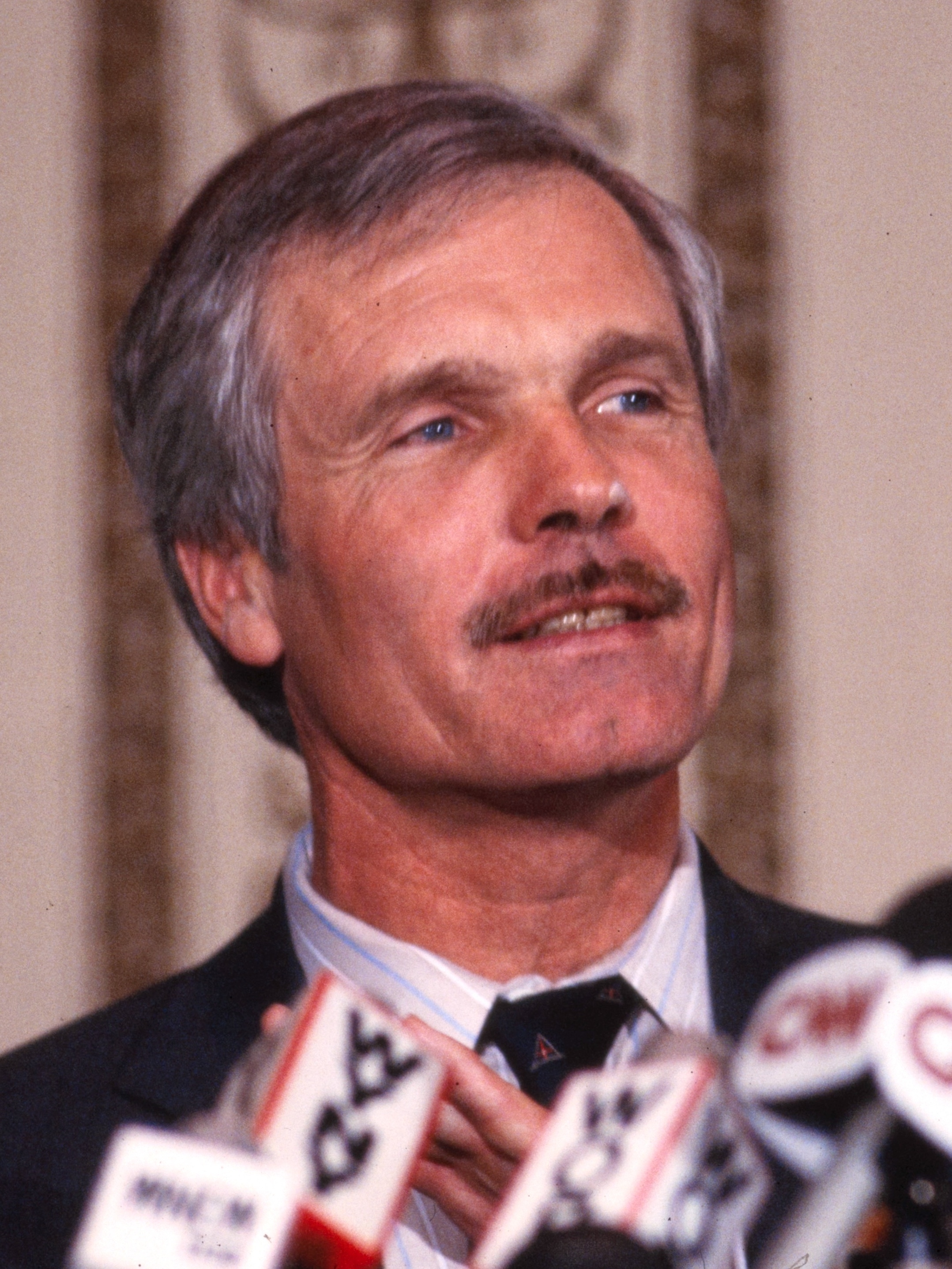
- Turner in 1985
- Born: Robert Edward Turner III; November 19, 1938; Cincinnati, Ohio, U.S.
- Died: May 6, 2026 (aged 87); Lamont, Florida, U.S.
- Education: Brown University (expelled)
- Occupations: Businessman; television producer; media proprietor; philanthropist
- Years active: 1960–2018
- Known for: Turner Broadcasting System
- Spouses: Julia Nye (m. 1960; div. 1964) Jane Smith (m. 1965; div. 1988) Jane Fonda (m. 1991; div. 2001)
- Children: 5
- Website: tedturner.com

Robert Edward Turner III (November 19, 1938 – May 6, 2026) was an American businessman, television producer, media proprietor, environmentalist and philanthropist. He founded CNN, the first 24-hour cable news channel, and WTBS, which pioneered the superstation concept in cable television. Turner also founded the television networks TNT, TBS, The Cartoon Network, Inc., and Turner Classic Movies, and acquired professional wrestling company Jim Crockett Promotions, which became the basis of the promotion World Championship Wrestling (WCW).

Turner began his media empire in March 1963 when he took over his father's billboard business—Turner Outdoor Advertising, then worth $1 million—after his father's suicide at the age of 53. His purchase of an Atlanta UHF station in 1970 began the Turner Broadcasting System. In 1980, he founded CNN, one of the most prominent news networks in the world. Turner owned the Atlanta Braves baseball team, which won the 1995 World Series. He turned the team into a nationally popular franchise, and he launched the charitable Goodwill Games. Turner was also a passionate proponent of professional wrestling as a television product, having aired wrestling on TBS dating back to 1971, and credited wrestling with helping TBS gain a national footprint with the coming of cable television. In 1988, Turner purchased Jim Crockett Promotions, which he then rebranded as WCW, a promotion that would supersede the World Wrestling Federation (WWF, now WWE) in popularity during the mid-1990s, an era now called the Monday Night War.

As a philanthropist, he gave $1 billion to create the United Nations Foundation, a public charity to broaden U.S. support for the United Nations; Turner served as co-chairman of its board of directors. In 2001, he co-founded the Nuclear Threat Initiative (NTI) with U.S. senator Sam Nunn (D‑GA), a nonprofit, nonpartisan organization dedicated to reducing "nuclear, biological, and emerging technology threats imperiling humanity."

In 2020, Forbes awarded Turner a perfect philanthropy score of 5, the highest possible rating, placing him among an exclusive group of just ten Forbes 400 members, alongside Warren Buffett, George Soros, Eli Broad, and others who have each given away at least 20% of their fortune.

Turner was also known for his controversial statements, which earned him the nicknames "The Mouth of the South" and "Captain Outrageous". He was the largest private landowner in the United States until John C. Malone surpassed him in 2011. He used much of his land for ranches to re-popularize bison meat for his Ted's Montana Grill chain, having amassed the largest privately owned bison herd in the world. Turner devoted much of his assets to environmental causes and also created the environmental-themed animated series Captain Planet and the Planeteers.

== Early life ==
Robert Edward Turner III was born on November 19, 1938, in Cincinnati, Ohio, the son of Florence (née Rooney) and Robert Edward Turner II, a billboard magnate. When he was nine, his family moved to Savannah, Georgia, where he was raised as an Episcopalian. He attended The McCallie School, a private boys' preparatory school in Chattanooga, Tennessee.

Turner attended Brown University and was vice-president of the Brown Debating Union and captain of the sailing team. He became a member of Kappa Sigma. Turner initially majored in classics. His father wrote that this choice made him "appalled, even horrified", and that he "almost puked". Turner later changed his major to economics, but before receiving a degree, he was expelled for having a female student in his dormitory room. He was awarded an honorary B.A. from Brown University in November 1989 when he returned to campus to give the keynote address for the National Association of College Broadcasters' second annual conference.

Turner joined the United States Coast Guard Reserve to fulfill his national service obligation before he would have been drafted. Honored by the United States Navy Memorial with its Lone Sailor Award in 2013, Turner told The Washington Post, "I liked boats", and ended up getting "deployed to some pretty sweet places — Charleston and Fort Lauderdale."

== Business career ==
=== WTBS ===
After leaving Brown University, Turner returned to the South in late 1960 to become general manager of the Macon, Georgia, branch of his father's business. Following his father's suicide in March 1963, Turner, at age 24, became president and chief executive of Turner Advertising Company; he turned the firm into a global enterprise. He joined the Young Republicans, saying he "felt at ease among these budding conservatives and was merely following in [his father]'s far-right footsteps", according to It Ain't as Easy as It Looks.

During the Vietnam War era, Turner's business prospered; it had "virtual monopolies in Savannah, Macon, Columbus, and Charleston" and was the "largest outdoor advertising company in the Southeast", according to It Ain't as Easy as It Looks. The book observed that Turner found that his father had sheltered a substantial amount of taxable income over the years by personally lending it back to the company and that the billboard business could be highly profitable tax-depreciable revenue stream that threw off enormous amounts of cash with almost no capital investment".

In the late 1960s, Turner purchased several Southern radio stations. In 1969, he sold his radio stations to buy a struggling television station in Atlanta, UHF channel 17 WJRJ-TV. At the time, UHF stations did well only in markets without VHF stations, like Fresno, California, or in markets with only one station on VHF. Independent UHF stations were not ratings winners or profitable even in larger markets, but Turner concluded that this would change as people wanted more than several choices. He changed the call sign to WTCG, representing Turner Communications Group, and promoted the company as "Watch This Channel Grow".

Initially, the station ran old movies from prior decades, along with theatrical cartoons, classic sitcoms and drama programs. As better syndicated products fell off the VHF stations, Turner would acquire them for his station at a very low price. WTCG ran mostly second- and even third-hand programming of the time, including fare such as Gilligan's Island, I Love Lucy, Star Trek, Hazel, and Bugs Bunny. Other low-cost content included humorist Bill Tush reading the news at 3 a.m., prompting Turner to jokingly comment that, "we have a 100% share at this time". Tush once delivered the news with his "co-anchor" Rex, a German Shepherd. The dog, which belonged to an associate, was shown next to Tush on set, wearing a shirt and tie while eating a peanut butter sandwich. Rex appeared only on one episode, but a myth grew where many people thought the dog was a nightly guest.

In 1972, WTCG acquired the rights to telecast Atlanta Braves and Atlanta Hawks games. In addition to the Atlanta station, Turner purchased the former WCTU in Charlotte, North Carolina, which became WRET-TV after his initials. The station initially flailed to the point that, in 1972, Turner appeared on the station to appeal for contributions from viewers; by 1975, the station had become profitable and one of the most-watched independent stations in the country. In 1976, each of the contributors to the station four years prior received checks returning their money—with interest. WRET became Charlotte's NBC affiliate in 1978.

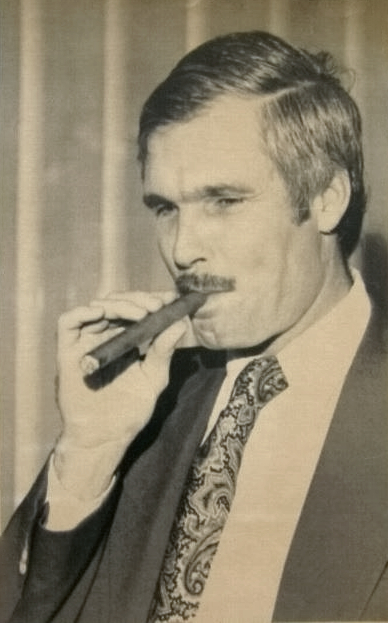
Turner c. 1976

In 1976, the Federal Communications Commission (FCC) allowed WTCG to use a satellite to transmit content to local cable television providers around the nation. On December 17, 1976, the rechristened WTCG-TV Super-Station began to broadcast old movies, situation comedy reruns, cartoons, and sports nationwide to cable-television subscribers. As cable systems developed, many carried his station to free their schedules, which increased his viewership and advertising. The number of subscribers eventually reached 2 million, and Turner's net worth rose to $100 million. He bought a 5,000-acre (2,000 ha) plantation in Jacksonboro, South Carolina, for $2 million.

In 1976, Turner purchased the Atlanta Braves, and in 1977, the Atlanta Hawks, partially to provide programming for WTCG. Using the rechristened WTBS superstation's status to broadcast Braves games into nearly every home in North America, Turner turned the Braves into a household name even before their sequential success in the 1990s and early 2000s. At one point, he suggested to pitcher Andy Messersmith, who wore number 17, that he change his surname to "Channel" to promote the television station.

In 1978, Turner struck a deal with a student-operated radio station at MIT, Technology Broadcasting System (now WMBR), to obtain the rights to the WTBS call sign for $50,000. Such a move allowed Turner to strengthen the branding of his "Super-Station" using the initials TBS. Turner Communications Group was renamed Turner Broadcasting System and WTCG was renamed WTBS.

In 1986, Turner founded the Goodwill Games, intending to ease tensions between capitalist and communist countries. Broadcasting the events of these games also provided his superstation the ability to provide Olympic-style sports programming. Turner Field, first used for the 1996 Summer Olympics as Centennial Olympic Stadium and then converted into a baseball-only facility for the Braves, was named after him.

=== CNN ===
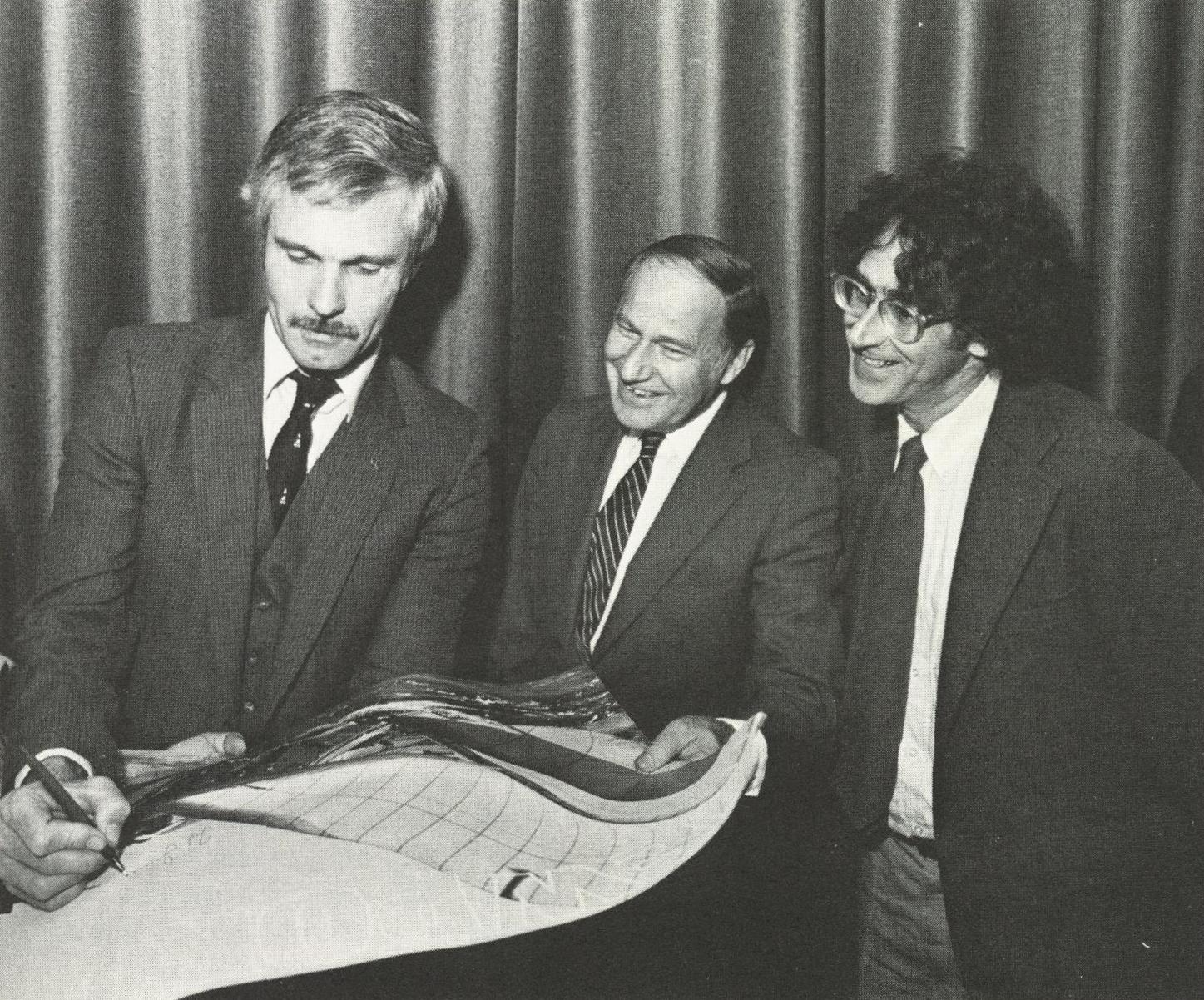
Turner in 1981

In 1978, Turner contacted media executive Reese Schonfeld about his plans to launch a 24-hour news channel (Schonfeld had previously approached Turner with the proposition in 1977 but was rebuffed). Schonfeld responded that it could be done with a staff of 300 if they used an all-electronic newsroom and satellites for all transmissions. It would require an initial investment of $15 million–$20 million and several million dollars per month to operate.

In 1979, Turner sold WRET-TV in Charlotte for $20 million, then a record price for a UHF television station, to fund the transaction and established its headquarters in lower-cost, non-union Atlanta. Schonfeld was appointed first president and chief executive of the then-named Cable News Network (CNN). CNN hired Jim Kitchell, former general manager of news at NBC, as vice president of production and operations; Sam Zelman as vice president of news and executive producer; Bill MacPhail as head of sports, Ted Kavanau as director of personnel, and Burt Reinhardt as vice president of the network. In 1982, Schonfeld was succeeded as CEO by Turner after a dispute over Schonfeld's firing of Sandi Freeman; and was succeeded as president by CNN's executive vice president, Burt Reinhardt.

==== Turner Doomsday Video ====
Turner famously stated before CNN debuted, "We won't be signing off until the world ends. We'll be on, and we will cover the end of the world, live, and that will be our last event ... We'll play the National Anthem only one time, on the 1st of June [the network's debut on June 1, 1980], and when the end of the world comes, we'll play 'Nearer, My God, to Thee' before we sign off." Reportedly, Turner planned to make good on that promise. To this end, he commissioned a video recording of a military marching band playing the hymn. Turner sometimes played the tape for reporters, noting the reason he made it. In 2015, the video was found in CNN's database and leaked. The video was tagged in the database as "[Hold for release] till end of world confirmed".

=== Other ventures ===
In 1981, Turner Broadcasting System acquired Brut Productions from Fabergé Cosmetics. After a failed attempt to acquire CBS, Turner instead purchased the film studio MGM/UA Entertainment Co. from Kirk Kerkorian in 1986 for $1.5 billion. Following the acquisition, Turner had amassed enormous debt and sold parts of the acquisition; Kerkorian bought back MGM/UA Entertainment. The MGM/UA Studio lot in Culver City was sold to Lorimar/Telepictures. Turner kept MGM's pre-May 1986 and pre-merger film and television library. Turner Entertainment Co. was established in August 1986 to oversee film and television properties owned by Turner in a deal with Kerkorian.

Having acquired MGM's back library of 2,200 films that were made before 1986, Turner syndicated them to television stations across the country. When broadcasting some older films originally filmed in black-and-white, he aired colorized versions of them. Opposition to Turner's colorization arose among cinephiles, film critics, actors, and directors. Film critic Roger Ebert wrote that broadcasting a colorized Casablanca "will be one of the saddest days in the history of the movies. It is sad because it demonstrates that there is no movie that Turner will spare, no classic, however great, that is safe from the vulgarity of his computerized graffiti gangs." Due in part to Turner's colorization, the Library of Congress established the National Film Registry intending to preserve American films in their original formats.

In 1988, Turner purchased Jim Crockett Promotions. He renamed it World Championship Wrestling (WCW), which became the main competitor to Vince McMahon's World Wrestling Federation (WWF). This rivalry became known as the Monday Night War, and would last throughout the 1990s. In 2001, under AOL Time Warner, WCW was sold to the WWF. Also in 1988, Turner introduced Turner Network Television (TNT) with Gone with the Wind. TNT, initially showing older movies and television shows, added original programs and newer reruns. Turner would later create Turner Classic Movies (TCM) in 1994, airing Turner's library of pre-1986 MGM films, Warner Bros. films made before 1948, and all RKO films, as well as license to 1,000 other films.

External videos
- Ted Turner: Captain Planet – a 2019 documentary hosted by Dr. Sanjay Gupta, highlighting the personal life, career, and environmental work of Ted Turner (CNN Philippines, full episode)

In 1989, Turner created the Turner Tomorrow Fellowship for fiction offering positive solutions to global problems. The winner, from 2,500 entries worldwide, was Daniel Quinn's Ishmael. In 1990, he created the Turner Foundation, which focuses on philanthropic grants concerning issues pertaining to the environment and overpopulation. In the same year, he created Captain Planet, an environmental superhero. Turner produced the television series Captain Planet and the Planeteers and its later sequel series with Captain Planet as the featured character.

Turner's companies purchased Hanna-Barbera Productions from Great American Broadcasting in 1991. Together with other Turner animation holdings, including the pre-May 1986 MGM library and pre-1949 Warner Bros. properties including early Looney Tunes and Merrie Melodies, the Hanna-Barbera library formed the core of Cartoon Network, which launched October 1, 1992.

In 1993, Turner and Russian journalist Eduard Sagalajev founded the Moscow Independent Broadcasting Corporation (MIBC). This corporation operated the sixth frequency in Russian television and founded the Russian channel TV-6. Turner pulled out in 1994, at the insistence of local executives. He considered re-entering the market in 2001, during a challenging period of independent NTV.

Also in 1993, Turner considered acquiring Paramount Pictures, but withdrew following a meeting with then-QVC head Barry Diller. Turner owned the Atlanta Thrashers, an ice hockey team that joined the National Hockey League in 1999. The team was sold in 2004, and they moved in 2011 to become the second incarnation of the Winnipeg Jets.

=== Time Warner merger ===
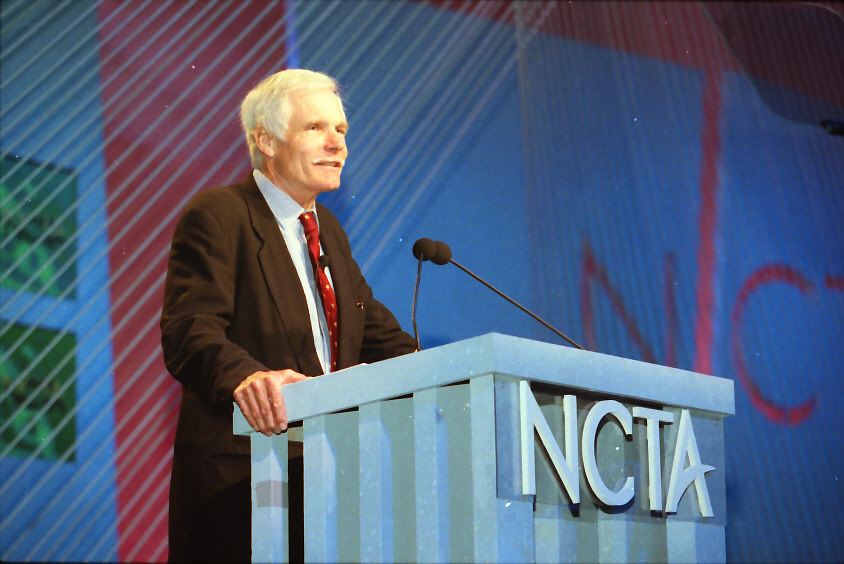
Turner speaking at an industry event in 2000

Turner Broadcasting System merged with Time Warner on October 10, 1996, with Turner as vice chairman and head of Time Warner and Turner's cable networks division. Turner was dropped as head of cable networks by CEO Gerald Levin but remained as Vice Chairman of Time Warner. He would be succeeded in March 2001 as head of Turner Broadcasting by Jamie Kellner, who was also greatly responsible for cancelling WCW's television contracts on networks which Turner previously ran. He resigned as AOL Time Warner vice chairman in 2003 and then from the Time Warner board of directors in 2006.

On January 11, 2001, Time Warner was purchased by America Online (AOL) to become AOL Time Warner, a merger which Turner initially supported. However, the burst of the dot-com bubble hurt the growth and profitability of the AOL division, which in turn dragged down AOL Time Warner's performance and stock price. At a board meeting in fall 2001, Turner's outburst against AOL Time Warner CEO Gerald Levin eventually led to Levin's announced resignation effective in early 2002, being replaced by Richard Parsons. In contrast to Levin, who as CEO isolated Turner from important company matters, Parsons invited Turner back to provide strategic advice, although Turner never received an operational role that he sought. Time Warner dropped "AOL" from its name in October 2003. In December 2009, AOL was spun off from the Time Warner conglomerate as a separate company.

Turner was Time Warner's biggest individual shareholder. It is estimated he lost as much as $7 billion when the stock collapsed in the wake of the merger. When asked about buying back his former assets, he replied that he "can't afford them now". In June 2014, Rupert Murdoch's 21st Century Fox made a bid for Time Warner valuing it at $80 billion. The Time Warner board rejected the offer, and it was formally withdrawn on August 5, 2014.

=== Rivalry with Rupert Murdoch ===
Turner had a long-running feud with fellow cable magnate Rupert Murdoch, which lasted for years. This originated in 1983 when a Murdoch-sponsored yacht collided with the yacht skippered by Turner, Condor, during the Sydney to Hobart Yacht Race, causing it to run aground 6.2 miles (10.0 km) from the finish line. At the post-race dinner, a drunken Turner verbally assaulted Murdoch, afterward challenging him to a televised fistfight in Las Vegas.

Murdoch's Fox News, established in 1996, became a rival to Turner's CNN, a channel that Murdoch regarded with disdain for its "liberal slant" in news coverage. In the midst of a merger between Turner's company and Time Warner, Turner said the combined company would "squash Rupert Murdoch like a bug." Soon after, Time Warner refused to carry Fox News on their New York City cable network.

In 2003, Turner challenged Murdoch to another physical fight, and later on accused Murdoch of being a "warmonger" for his support and backing of President George W. Bush's invasion of Iraq. However, in an interview with Variety in 2019, Turner said he and Murdoch had since made amends.

=== Atlanta Braves ===
Ted Turner

Atlanta Braves – No. 27
- Manager

MLB debut
- May 11, 1977, for the Atlanta Braves

Last MLB appearance
- May 11, 1977, for the Atlanta Braves

MLB statistics
- Games: 1
- Win–loss record: 0–1
- Winning %: .000
- Managerial record at Baseball Reference

Teams
- Atlanta Braves (1977)

Turner was suspended for one year by Commissioner of Baseball Bowie Kuhn on January 3, 1977, for his actions while pursuing the signing of free agent outfielder Gary Matthews from the San Francisco Giants. Matthews signed a five-year, $1.875 million contract with the Braves on November 18, 1976. Kuhn's actions stemmed from remarks made by Turner to then–Giants owner Bob Lurie during the 1976 World Series. In addition, the Braves were also stripped of their first-round selections in the June 1978 draft of high school and college players. Turner, then successfully appealed the suspension and Kuhn relented and reinstated the draft selections, one of which would turn out to be Bob Horner from Arizona State University.

On May 11, 1977, with the team mired in a 16-game losing streak, Turner sent manager Dave Bristol on a 10-day "scouting trip," and Turner himself took over as interim manager – the first owner/manager in the majors since Connie Mack. He ran the team for one game (a loss to the Pittsburgh Pirates) before National League president Chub Feeney ordered him to stop running the team. Feeney cited major league rules that bar managers and players from owning stock in their clubs. Turner appealed to Commissioner of Baseball Bowie Kuhn, and showed up to manage the Braves when they returned home. However, Kuhn turned down the appeal, citing Turner's "lack of familiarity with game operations."

In the mid-1980s, Turner began leaving day-to-day operations to the baseball operations staff, and the team—still under Turner's ownership—won the 1995 World Series. In 1996, Turner admitted, "For the 10 years I ran [the team], it was a disaster. ... As I relinquished control of the Braves and gave somebody else the responsibility, it did well." The Atlanta Braves were sold by Time Warner (which had assumed control after the merger with Turner Broadcasting System) to Liberty Media in 2007.

=== Turner Enterprises ===
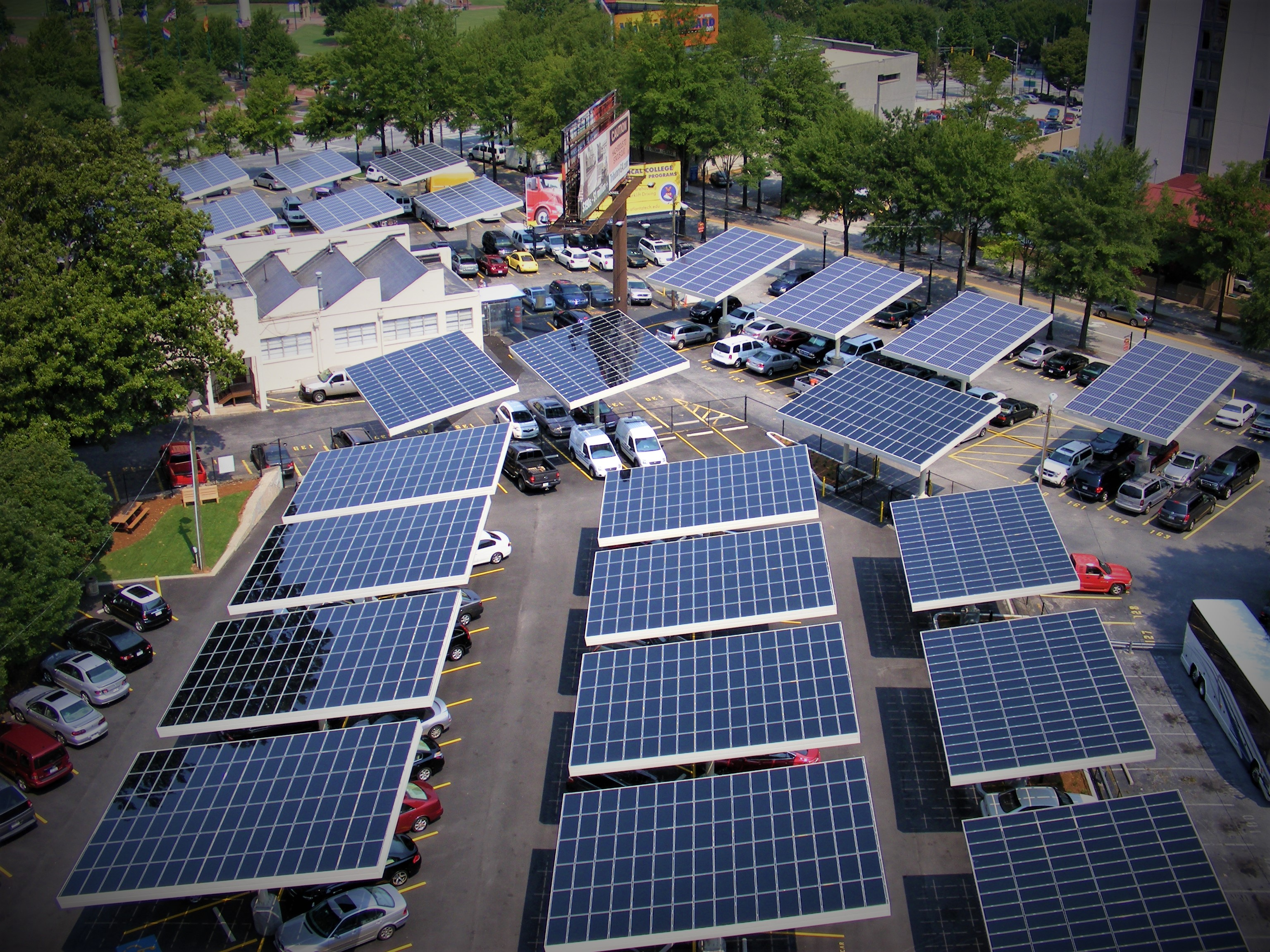
Turner Building Solar Array

Turner Enterprises, Inc. (TEI) is a private U.S. company that was founded in 1976 and manages the business interests, land holdings, and investments of Ted Turner and now his estate, including the oversight of Turner's 24 properties across the United States and Argentina. At two million acres of personal and ranch land, Turner was the second-largest landowner in North America. He owned 19 ranches – 16 in the western U.S. and three in Argentina. In January 2016, the Osage Nation bought Turner's 43,000-acre (17,000 ha) Bluestem Ranch in Osage County, Oklahoma. Turner had purchased the property in 2001 primarily to raise bison.

Through Turner Enterprises, he owned ranches in Colorado, Kansas, Montana, Nebraska, New Mexico, Oklahoma, and South Dakota. Totaling 1,910,585 acres (7,731.86 km^{2}), his land-holdings across the United States made Turner one of the largest individual landowners in North America (by acreage). According to the Flatwater Free Press, a Nebraska non-profit newspaper, Turner was the largest owner of Nebraska farmland.

TEI ranches are primarily used for bison ranching. His bison herd, approximately 51,000 animals on 15 ranches, is the largest private herd in the world. The company's mission statement is "To manage Turner lands in an economically sustainable and ecologically sensitive manner while promoting the conservation of native species." Other important wildlife species on the property include whitetail Deer, wild turkey and bobwhite quail. In addition to bison ranching, TEI ranches are also used for commercial fishing and hunting, as well as limited sustainable timber harvesting, as well as eco-tourism on the New Mexico ranches. His biggest ranch is Vermejo Reserve in New Mexico. At 920 square miles (2,400 km^{2}), it is the largest privately owned, contiguous tract of land in the United States. Turner purchased the 363.000-acre Armendaris Ranch, an old Spanish land grant, in 1994. It is used for eco-tourism and raising bison, and it is located in the Chihuahuan Desert east of Elephant Butte Reservoir and adjoining White Sands Missile Range.

TEI works closely with Turner's philanthropic and charitable interests, including the founding and ongoing operations of the United Nations Foundation, Nuclear Threat Initiative, Turner Foundation, Captain Planet Foundation, and the Turner Endangered Species Fund. Turner Enterprises is headquartered in the Turner Building (formerly the Bona Allen Office Building) in Atlanta, Georgia, also home to the Ted's Montana Grill restaurant chain, Ted Turner Reserves, and Turner Renewable Energy. In 2011, Ted Turner and TEI completed construction of a 25-panel solar array in the company's parking lot, which provides solar power to the Turner Building and its businesses. Chaired by Turner, TEI's executive leadership also includes CEO and President S. Taylor Glover. The "Turner Institute of Ecoagriculture" was created by Turner in July 2021 as a 501(c)(3) nonprofit agricultural research organization for charitable, educational and scientific purposes. After Turner's death it will ensure that "his lands will continue to be protected, limiting future development and parcellation."

=== Ted Turner Pictures ===
Ted Turner Pictures is an American film production company that was based in Atlanta, Georgia. It was formed in 2001 as a unit of Turner Enterprises, with financial backing provided by Warner Bros., and its intent was to produce feature films and documentaries, and spawned Ted Turner Productions and Ted Turner Documentaries.

Ted Turner Pictures was led by CEO Robert Wussler, and plans to produce projects for three of Turner's major interests: the United Nations Foundation, the Turner Foundation, and the Nuclear Threat Institute and contains a clause that its theatrical movie ideas will be pitched first to Warner Bros. The only film to came out of the new company was Gods and Generals, as the company shuttered in 2003.

The only other project to came out of the Ted Turner Documentaries was the PBS four-part miniseries Avoiding Armageddon, which was produced in association with WETA-TV and aired in 2003.

== Political views ==
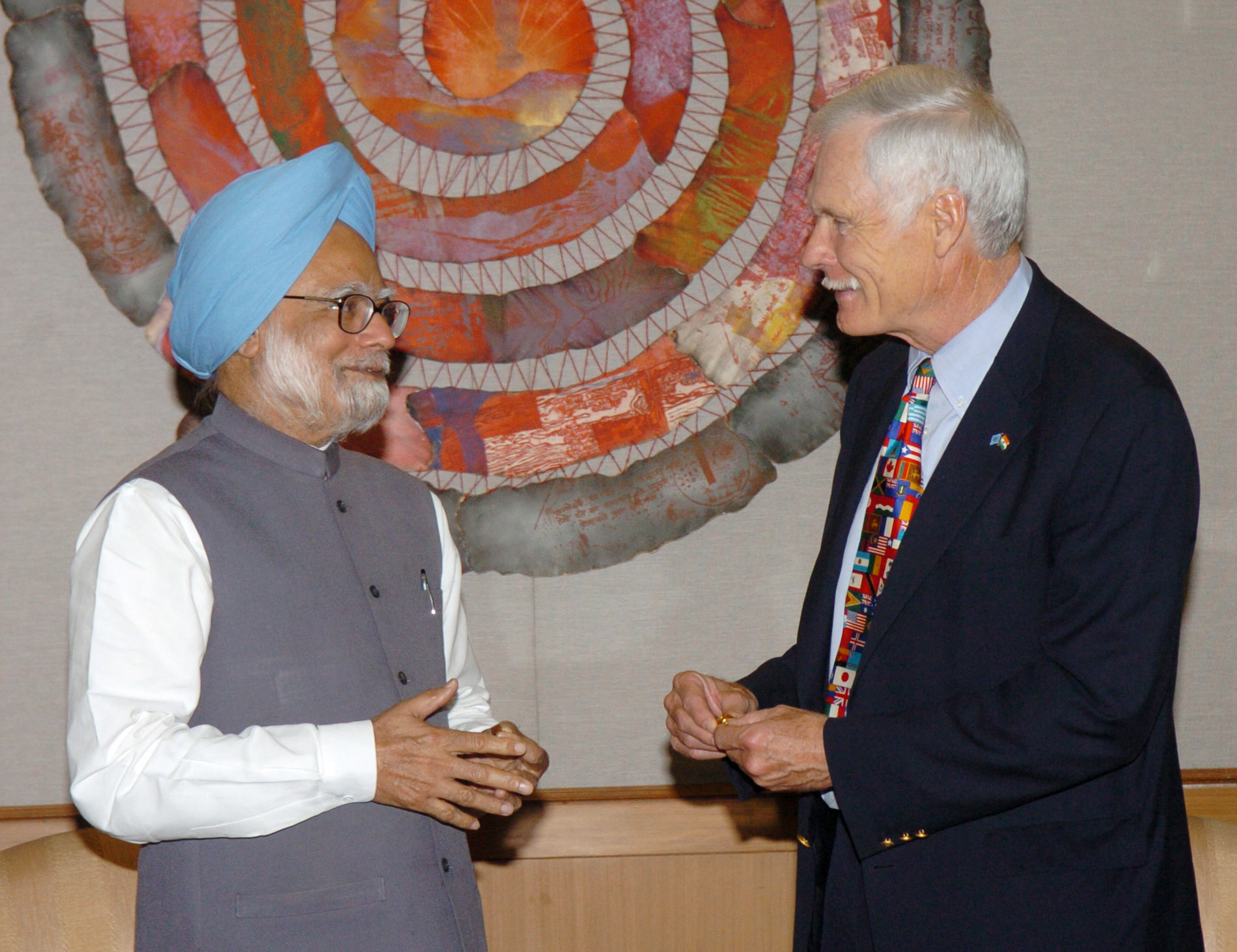
Turner with the Prime Minister of India, Manmohan Singh, in New Delhi in 2005

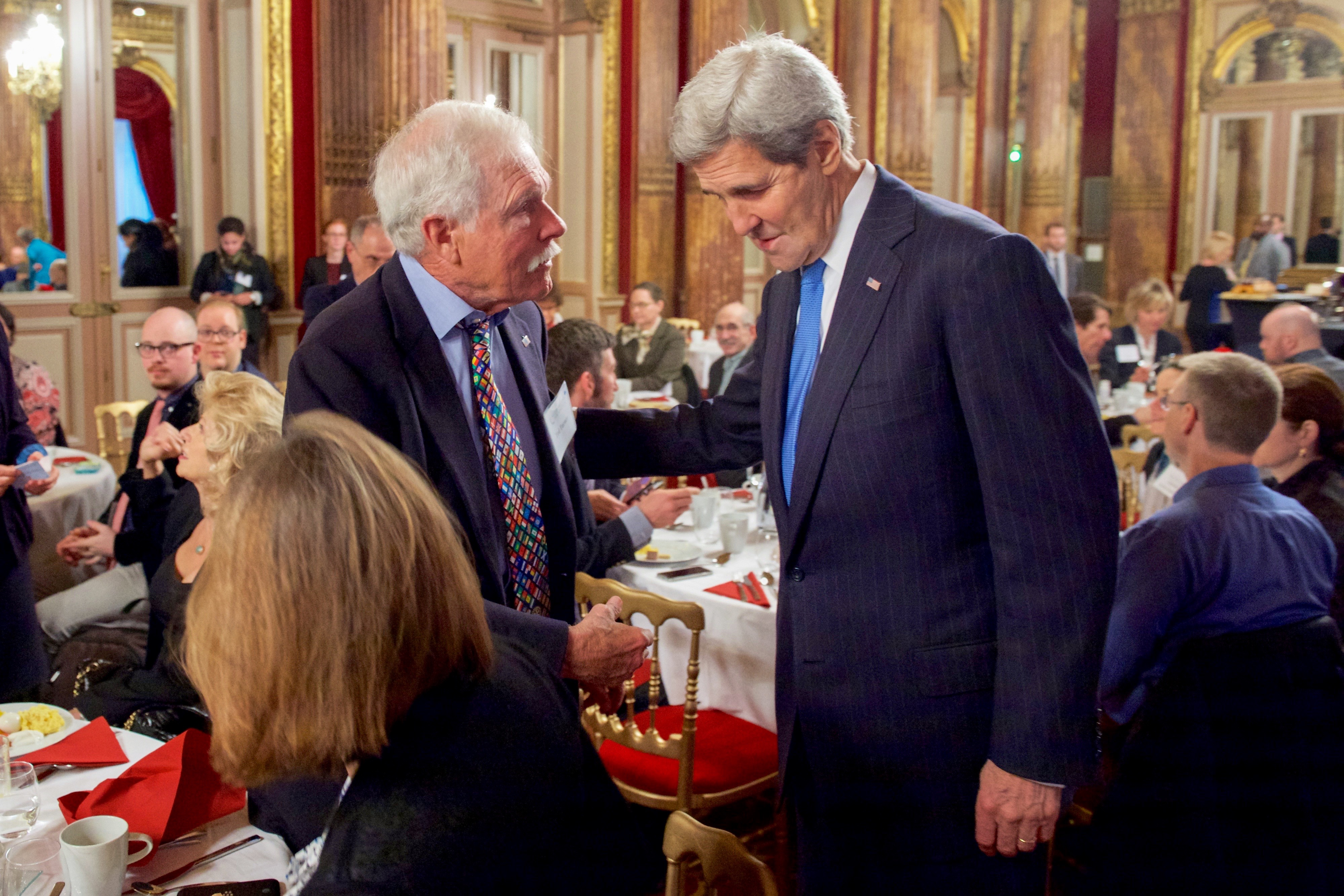
Turner and U.S. Secretary of State John Kerry in December 2015

As a youth, Turner was a member of the Young Republicans. His political views as an adult were described by Out magazine as being aligned with "progressive politics and humanistic values", and as having had "a lasting impact on Turner Broadcasting and its parent company".

On September 19, 2006, in a Reuters Newsmaker conference, Turner said of Iran's position on nuclear weapons: "They're a sovereign state. We have 28,000. Why can't they have 10? We don't say anything about Israel‍—‌, they've got 100 of them approximately‍—‌or India or Pakistan or Russia." Turner was a proponent of healthcare reform bills, and said: "We're the only first-world country that doesn't have universal healthcare and it's a disgrace."

In 2010, following both the Deepwater Horizon oil spill and the Upper Big Branch Mine disaster that killed 29 miners in West Virginia, Turner stated on CNN that "I'm just wondering if God is telling us he doesn't want to drill offshore. And right before that, we had that coal mine disaster in West Virginia where we lost 29 miners ... Maybe the Lord's tired of having the mountains of West Virginia, the tops knocked off of them, so they may get more coal. I think maybe we ought to just leave the coal in the ground and go with solar and wind power and geothermals ..."

Turner endorsed Democratic candidate Hillary Clinton in the 2016 U.S. presidential election. In 2018, he revealed he had once considered a run for president when he was married to Jane Fonda, who told him she would leave him if he ran.

=== Curbing population growth ===
Along with advocating for clean water and improved stewardship of the land, he established the Turner Foundation to address ways to curb population growth. Turner put $125 million of his own money into the foundation and spent $6 million per year to address population growth rates. Addressing the issue at a Montana gathering in 1996, he stated that he denied discussing any elimination of population growth. He went on to discuss hunger and poverty and ways to address those issues.

In 2009, Turner met with other business moguls, including Oprah Winfrey, Bill Gates, George Soros, and David Rockefeller to address issues ranging from the environment to healthcare. The group also addressed population growth by discussing vaccines and immunization efforts, whose measures faced criticism driven by perceptions that public health policy is orchestrated by a small group of elites. Although no formal statement was released, the event was covered by Paul Harris for The Guardian.

== Controversial comments and other controversies ==
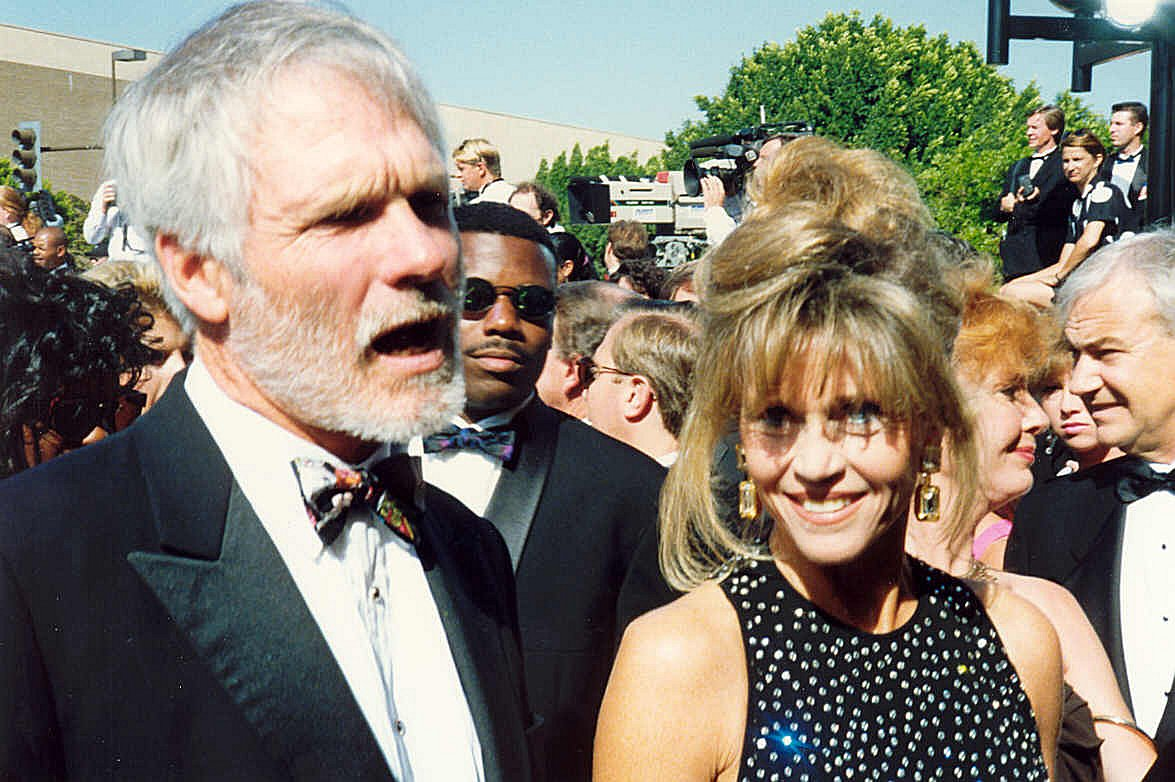
With wife Jane Fonda in 1992

His penchant for controversial statements and actions earned him the nicknames "The Mouth of the South" and "Captain Outrageous". Turner was said to have leaned into the "Captain Outrageous" behavior and name, which was noted to have influenced similar moguls to act in the same manner.

In 1991, some Native Americans and Native advocacy groups expressed anger after Turner and his then-wife Jane Fonda were shown on national television doing a "tomahawk chop" team cheer during the World Series. Subsequently, Fonda pledged to refrain from the cheer, while Turner said that he had been unaware of the reaction it would cause.

Turner once called observers of Ash Wednesday "Jesus freaks", though he apologized, and dubbed religious opponents of abortion "bozos". In 1990, Turner said that Christianity was for losers, for which he apologized later that year, and in 1999, Turner made a joke about Polish mine detectors when asked about Pope John Paul II. After a harsh response from the Polish deputy foreign minister Radek Sikorski, Turner apologized. In 2008, Turner told MSNBC that he no longer considered himself an atheist and had begun praying for his friends.

In 2002, Turner accused Israel of terror: "The Palestinians are fighting with human suicide bombers, that's all they have. The Israelis ... they've got one of the most powerful military machines in the world. The Palestinians have nothing. So who are the terrorists? I would make a case that both sides are involved in terrorism." He apologized, but also defended himself: "Look, I'm a very good thinker, but I sometimes grab the wrong word ... I mean, I don't type my speeches, then sit up there and read them off the teleprompter, you know. I wing it."

Also in 2008, Turner asserted on PBS's Charlie Rose that if steps are not taken to address global warming, most people would die and "the rest of us will be cannibals". Turner also said in the interview that he advocated Americans having no more than two children. In 2010, he stated that the People's Republic of China's one-child policy should be implemented.

== Personal life ==
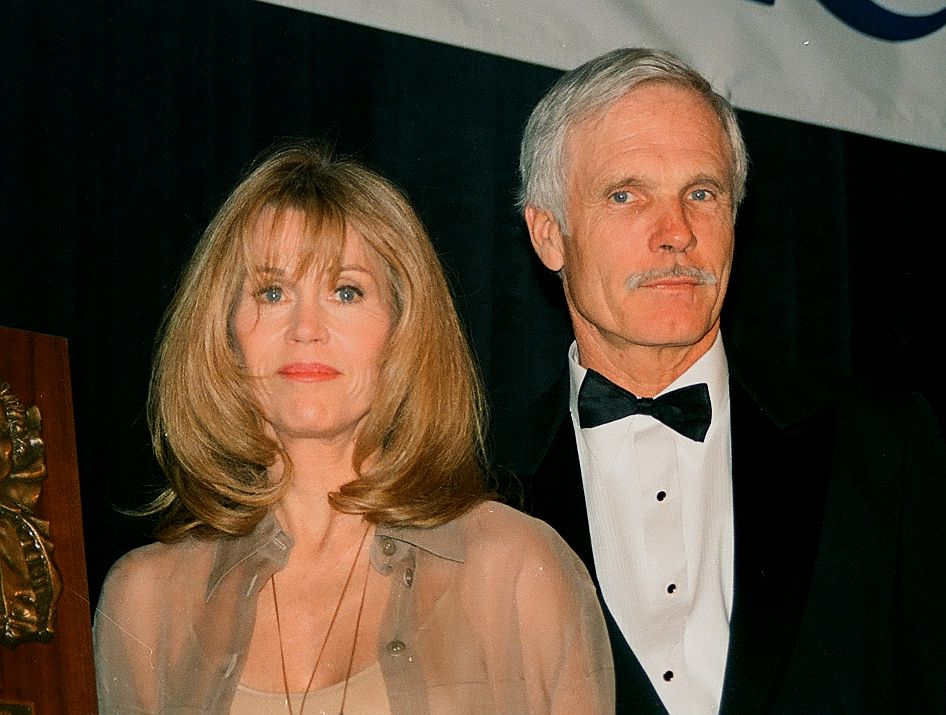
Turner and his third wife, Jane Fonda, in Washington, D.C., 2000

Turner rejected religion following the death of his sister. However, in 2008, he said he was no longer an agnostic or an atheist, as he had previously identified. Turner stated, 'I regret anything I said about religion that was negative,' and mentioned that he had begun praying for friends who were ill.

Turner was married and divorced three times: to Judy Nye (1960–1964), Jane Shirley Smith (1965–1988), and actress Jane Fonda (1991–2001). The latter marriage took place on December 21, 1991, on Fonda's birthday, and the divorce was filed on May 22, 2001. He had five children: Laura Turner Seydel and Robert Edward Turner IV by his first wife, and Beau Turner, Rhett Turner, and Jennie Turner Garlington by his second wife. Generally, his children have followed in Ted's philanthropic and conservationist goals.

All of Turner's sons are graduates of The Citadel in Charleston, South Carolina. In 2010, Turner joined Warren Buffett's and Bill Gates's The Giving Pledge, vowing to donate the majority of his fortune to charity upon his death.

In the 1993 biography It Ain't As Easy as It Looks by Porter Bibb, Turner discussed his use of lithium and struggles with mental illness. An earlier 1981 biography, Lead, Follow or Get Out of the Way by Christian Williams, chronicles Turner's founding of CNN. In 2008, Turner wrote Call Me Ted, which documents his career and personal life.

=== Sailing ===
Ted Turner
Sailing career
- Sport: Sailing
- College team: Brown University
- Club: Savannah Yacht Club
Medal record
Sailing
Representing United States
World Championships
Gold medal – first place	1971 Seawanhaka	5.5m
Silver medal – second place	1970 Sydney	5.5m
Silver medal – second place	1972 Geneva	5.5m
Silver medal – second place	1976 Hankø	5.5m

Turner had a lifelong interest in sailing. When Turner was 26, he entered sailing competitions at the Savannah Yacht Club and competed in Olympic trials in 1964. He became the Southern Ocean Racing Conference champion in 1966 with his first cruising yacht, Vamp X. He first attempted to win the America's Cup in 1974, losing in the defender's trials, aboard 12 Metre class yacht US–25 Mariner. Turner was defeated by Ted Hood aboard US–26 Courageous.

Turner was asked to join the 1977 America's Cup defense syndicate formed by Hood and Lee Loomis for the New York Yacht Club. That group still owned the Courageous but decided to design and construct a new 12 Metre – US–28 Independence – to defend the 1974 America's Cup victory. However, in the trials, with Turner as skipper aboard the 3-year-old Courageous proved to be the faster than Hood and Independence and was selected to race in the 1977 races.

From September 13 to 18, 1977, Courageous, with Turner in command, defeated the challenger Australia, skippered by Noel Robins, in a four-race sweep. Courageous' greatest winning margin out of all four races was 2 minutes and 23 seconds. In the 1979 Fastnet Race, in a storm that killed 15 participants, Turner skippered the S&S-designed 61-footer Tenacious to a corrected-time victory. Turner had also appeared on the cover of Sports Illustrated on July 4, 1977, after winning the 1977 America's Cup. Turner was inducted into the America's Cup Hall of Fame in 1993, and the National Sailing Hall of Fame in 2011.

=== Health and death ===
In 2018, Turner revealed his diagnosis of Lewy body dementia. In an interview with Atlanta magazine, Turner's former wife Jane Fonda said that by publicizing his management of the disease, he would give many more people the opportunity to learn about it. Turner's final public appearances took place during a celebration of former President Jimmy Carter and former First Lady Rosalynn Carter's 75th wedding anniversary in 2021 and Turner's 85th birthday celebration in 2023. In January 2025, Turner was hospitalized with pneumonia and later recuperated at a rehabilitation facility. Turner died at his 29,000-acre (12,000 ha) Avalon Plantation home in Lamont, Florida, on May 6, 2026, at the age of 87.

== Legacy ==
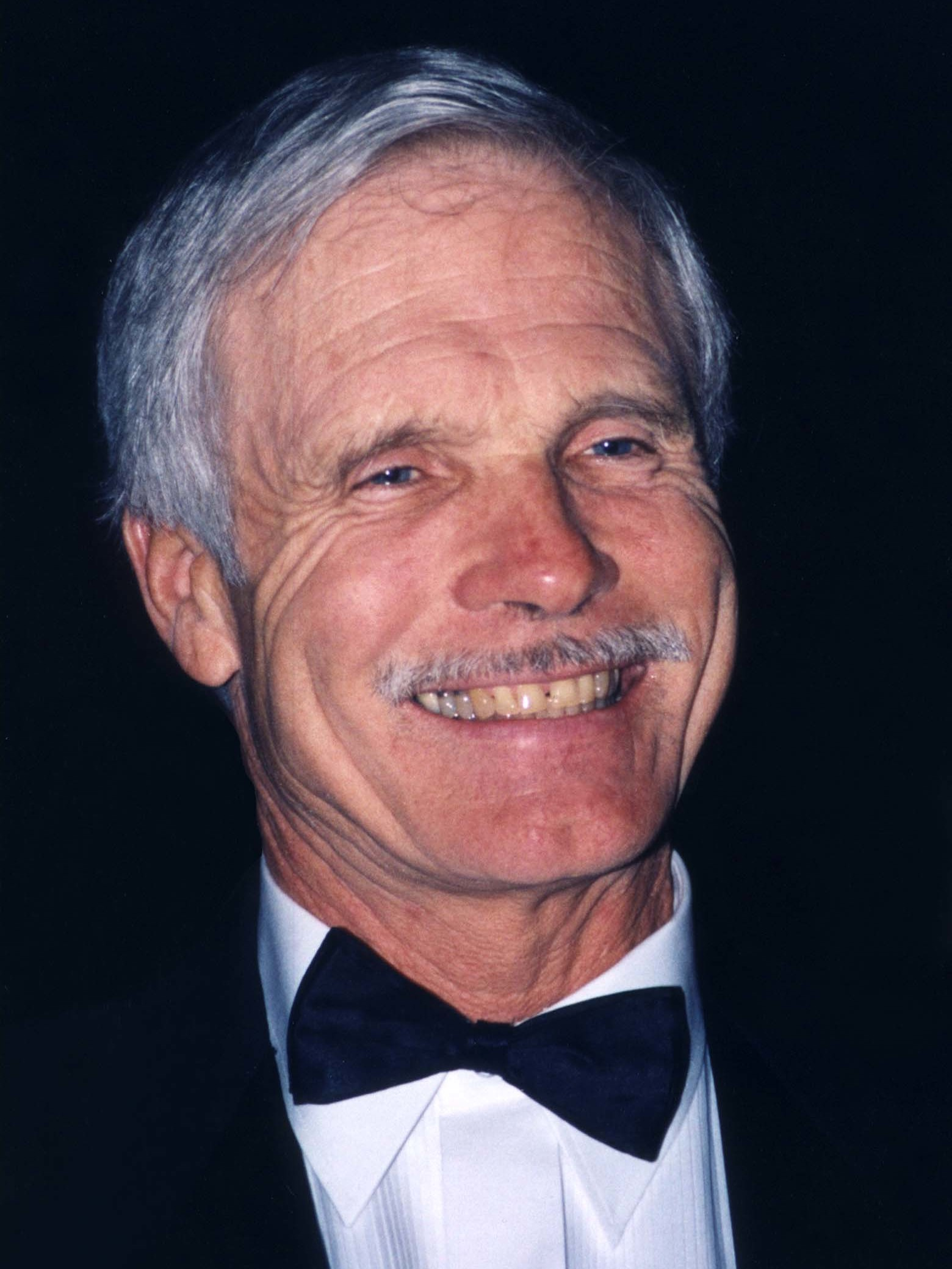
Turner in 1999

Turner is regarded as one of the entrepreneurs who transformed the cable industry and has been referred to as "the Alexander the Great of broadcasting" by Slate:

While Turner has been described as a "valiant liberator" and cast the networks as oppressive scoundrels, in content, his programming fell short of inspiring. His network was built on sitcom reruns, old movies, cartoons, and Atlanta Braves games. He found an audience for classics of a bygone time, along with slightly down-market content such as professional wrestling. Nonetheless, he would find glorious terms even for retreads and junk, claiming to be pulling America back to television's golden age: "I want to get it back to the principles," he once said, "that made us good." Nostalgic, Manichean, and boot-strappy: like programmer, like programming.

The cable industry boomed in the late 1970s and early 1980s, as nearly a dozen cable networks launched based on the Turner model. They include much of what we now consider the staples of cable TV, including ESPN, MTV, Bravo, Showtime, BET, the Discovery Channel, and the Weather Channel. Those are the better-known channels only by virtue of having survived; others, such as ARTS, CBS Cable, and the Satellite News Channel, folded or were acquired by other companies.

Professional wrestling promoter and former Senior Vice President of WCW, second in charge after Turner, Eric Bischoff praised Turner, claiming "He was an inspirational leader, he was a risk taker, he appreciated people who took risks, he was not afraid of failure, while most people are. Ted was not afraid to fail; he was more afraid of not trying and not conquering that next horizon."

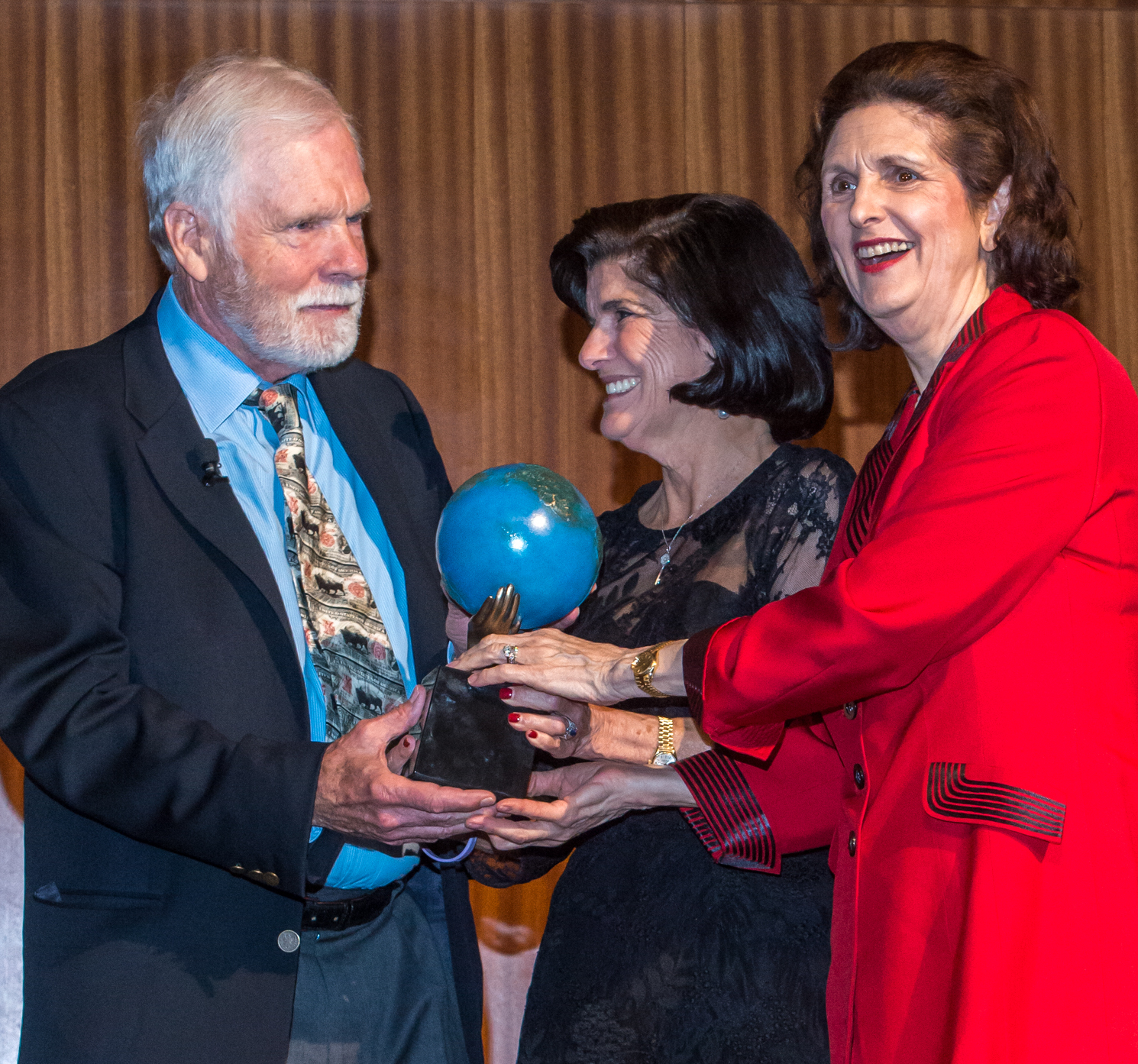
Turner being honored with the 2015 Lady Bird Johnson Environmental Award by Luci and Lynda Johnson at the LBJ Presidential Library

On June 24, 1999, Vince McMahon stated on Late Night with Conan O'Brien: "All I'll say about Ted is he's a son-of-a-bitch, other than that, he's probably not a bad guy, but I don't like him at all". Later in 2021, when asked about the upstart All Elite Wrestling (AEW) in comparison to Turner's WCW, McMahon dismissed AEW, stating that "it certainly is not a situation where 'rising tides' because that was when Ted Turner was coming after us with all of Time Warner's assets as well".

In 2010, Turner was named a Georgia Trustee, an honor given by the Georgia Historical Society, in conjunction with the Governor of Georgia, to individuals whose accomplishments and community service reflect the ideals of the founding body of Trustees, which governed the Georgia colony from 1732 to 1752. In 2019, the Techwood Campus, which had been home to Turner Broadcasting System from 1980 to 2019 and has since been home to its various networks, was renamed the Ted Turner Campus, and a mural featuring Turner was presented.

The Turner Institute of Ecoagriculture was created by Turner in July 2021 as a 501(c)(3) nonprofit agricultural research organization for charitable, educational and scientific purposes. After Turner's death it will ensure that "his lands will continue to be protected, limiting future development and parcellation."

=== Tributes ===
Following his death, Turner was eulogized by The New York Times as the creator of the "24-Hour News Cycle" while also regarding him as one of the most important figures in media history and describing his business career as having had an impact on American culture. In their obituary, CNN also called Turner a "pioneer" of cable television who revolutionized television news. The BBC noted that Turner's career was a "central part of the media landscape". U.S. President Donald Trump paid tribute to him as "one of the greats of broadcast history". The Hollywood Reporter published an article saying "there is no one in American history who has done more to change how the world gets its news, for better or for worse, than Ted Turner".

Aside from his impact on the media industry, Turner was also noted for his impact on the sports industry. CNN mentioned how Turner had an impact in the baseball industry by "transforming" the Atlanta Braves into "America's Team". He was also said to have helped local baseball and other sports teams develop a more national footprint. A major figure in professional wrestling through his involvement with WCW, professional wrestling promotion AEW held their May 6 Dynamite and Collision double episode on TBS in tribute to Turner, with former WCW employees Tony Schiavone and Sting providing a eulogy for Ted.

Turner's former wife, Jane Fonda, said upon his death, "He swept into my life, a gloriously handsome, deeply romantic, swashbuckling pirate and I've never been the same. He needed me. No one had ever let me know they needed me, and this wasn't your average human being that needed me, this was the creator of CNN, and Turner Classic Movies, who had won the America's Cup as the world's greatest sailor...".

== Awards and honors ==
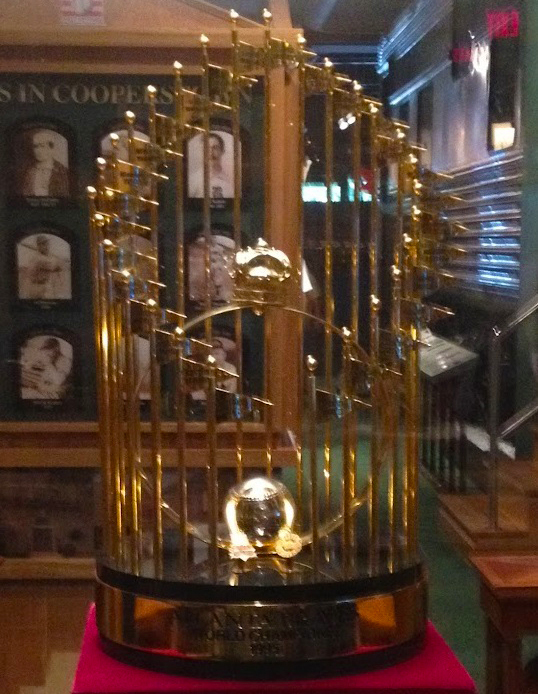
The Commissioner's Trophy given to the Atlanta Braves – owned at the time by Turner – for winning the 1995 World Series

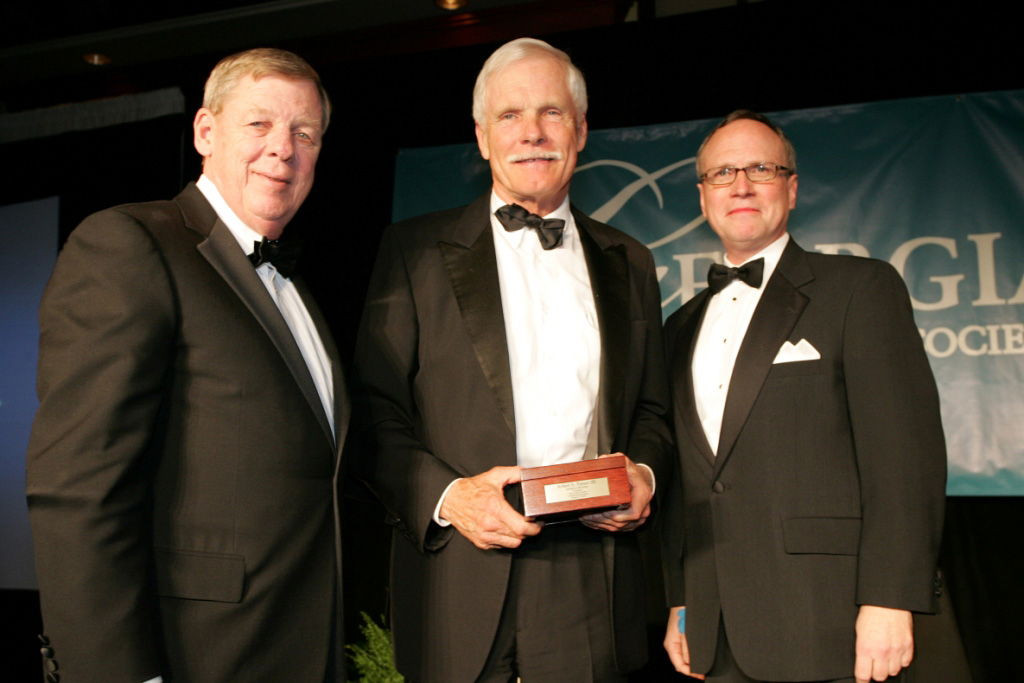
Turner being honored as a Georgia Trustee by the Georgia Historical Society alongside U.S. senator Johnny Isakson (left) and Georgia Historical Society president Todd Groce (right)

Emmy Awards

- 2014: Lifetime Achievement – Sports
- 2015: Lifetime Achievement – News & Documentary

Sports

- 1995: World Series champion (as owner of the Atlanta Braves)
- 1996: Atlanta Braves home ballpark (1996–2016) named Turner Field
- 2004: Commemorative banner at State Farm Arena honoring his tenure as owner of the Atlanta Hawks

Media

- 1984: Golden Plate Award of the American Academy of Achievement
- 1989: Paul White Award, Radio Television Digital News Association
- 1990: Walter Cronkite Award for Excellence in Journalism.
- 1991: Time magazine's Man of the Year.
- 1997: Peabody Award winner
- 1999: Edison Achievement Award for his commitment to innovation throughout his career
- 2000: Edward R. Murrow Award for Lifetime Achievement in Communication

Halls of Fame

- 1992: Television Academy Hall of Fame inductee
- 2004: Star on the Hollywood Walk of Fame
- 2026: Wrestling Observer Newsletter Hall of Fame

Organizational

- 1990: Humanist of the Year Award from the American Humanist Association
- 1991: Audubon medal from the National Audubon Society
- 2001: Albert Schweitzer Gold Medal for Humanitarianism
- 2010: Georgia Trustee, an honor given by the Georgia Historical Society, in conjunction with the Governor of Georgia
- 2013: Lone Sailor Award, which recognizes Navy, Marine and Coast Guard veterans who have distinguished themselves in their civilian careers (Turner was a Coast Guard veteran).
