= Royal Sydney Yacht Squadron =

Yacht club in Sydney, New South Wales

Coordinates: 33°50′53″S 151°13′09″E

- Burgee
- Short name: RSYS
- Founded: 1862
- Location: Kirribilli, North Sydney, Australia
- Website: Royal Sydney Yacht Squadron

The Royal Sydney Yacht Squadron (RSYS) is a yacht club located in North Sydney, Australia in the suburb of Kirribilli. The squadron was founded in 1862. It has occupied its grounds in East Kirribilli, near Kirribilli House, since 1902.

== History ==
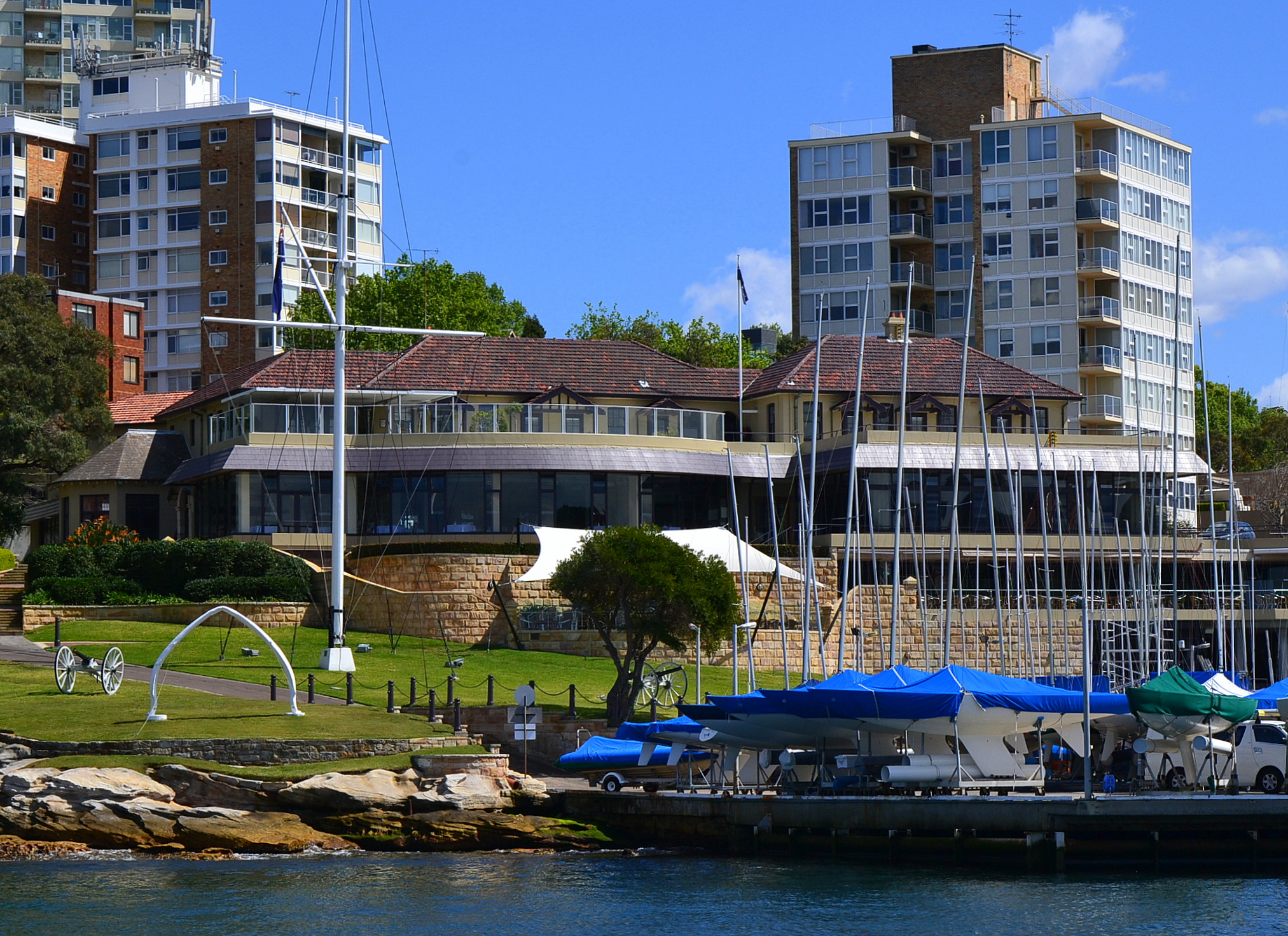
Royal Sydney Yacht Squadron

The Royal Sydney Yacht Squadron was founded when nineteen yachtsmen met in the office of William Walker MLC on 8 July 1862, to found a yacht club to be designated 'the Australian Yacht Club'. An application was made for a Royal charter and the patronage of the Prince of Wales. On 27 June 1863 Walker, as commodore, received a letter from the Colonial Secretary's Office notifying him of the Prince of Wales' willingness to become Patron of the 'Royal Sydney Yacht Squadron'. This letter also issued an Admiralty Warrant authorising the use of the Blue Ensign of Her Majesty's Fleet. A later patron was Prince Philip, Duke of Edinburgh.

It was not until 1902 that the squadron was able to lease a property at Wudyong Point on the eastern side of Kirribilli, with a stone cottage, a landing stage and a slipway. The site was occupied on 24 January 1903. The whale's jawbones, forming an archway over the pathway, came from a whaling station at Twofold Bay. The flagstaff was salvaged from the collier Bellambi and presented by Sir Frederick Waley, a member.

The Royal Sydney Yacht Squadron is one of the main members of the International Council of Yacht Clubs.

== International America's Cup challenges ==
In 1962, the squadron challenged the New York Yacht Club for the America's Cup. The Gretel lost 4–1. 1970 RSYS again raced in Newport Rhode Island. The Gretel II lost 4–1.

== Purpose ==
The Royal Sydney Yacht Squadron is a private member sailing club. The squadron grounds, facilities and services are provided for the enjoyment and utilization of members and invited guests in their company. The Royal Sydney Yacht Squadron is not open to the public.

The Squadron's main objective is to promote sailing as a sport.

== Youth Sailing ==
The squadron's Youth Sailing program commenced in 1960. The aims of the program are, broadly stated, to foster and promote sailing and to provide young men and women with social skills, confidence, values and friends that will place them in good stead to approach the challenges of life.

The youth program uses three Laser Classes, 4.7, Radial and Standard, and the Optimist Class, as well as Pacers and Elliot 7s.

== See also ==
- International Council of Yacht Clubs
- Harry Andreas – Old Rear Commodore RSYS
- Frank Packer Old Vice Commodore RSYS
- Sydney Flying Squadron, neighbouring club
