= 1980 Herbert Pell Cup =

4th Herbert Pell Cup
Event information
- Type: Challenge race for America's Cup
- Dates: 1980
- Host city: Newport, Rhode Island
- Boats: Sun City Yacht Club (Australia) Royal Southern Yacht Club (Australia); Yacht Club of Hyéres (France)

Results
- Winner: Sun City Yacht Club (Australia)

Succession
- Previous: 1977 Herbert Pell Cup
- Next: 1983 Louis Vuitton Cup

The 1980 Herbert Pell Cup was held in Newport, Rhode Island, United States in 1980. The winner, Australia, was awarded the Herbert Pell Cup and went on to challenge for the 1980 America's Cup.

In a defenders selection series that was held simultaneously, three boats competed for the right to defend the America's Cup.

== Teams ==
=== Australia (AUS) ===
Australia, the winner of the 1977 Herbert Pell Cup, returned. This time representing the Royal Perth Yacht Club, Australia was owned by Alan Bond in his third challenge for the America's Cup. The boat was skippered by James Hardy and the crew included tactician Ben Lexcen, port trimmer John Bertrand, Scott McAllister, John Longley and Kenneth Judge.

=== Lionheart (GBR) ===
Representing the Royal Southern Yacht Club, Lionheart was Britains first challenge for 16 years.

=== France III (FRA) ===
Marcel Bich returned for his final challenge for the Cup. This time with a new boat, France III, the boat represented the Yacht Club of Hyéres and was helmed by Bruno Troublé.

=== Sverige (SWE) ===
Sverige returned, representing the Royal Gothenburg Yacht Club and skippered by Pelle Petterson.

== Matches ==
Semi-finals
Australia	4
(Sweden) Sverige	3
(United Kingdom) Lionheart	3
France III	4

Final
Australia	4
France III	1
