= Monark (disambiguation) =

Monark is a Swedish bicycle, moped and motorcycle manufacturer.

Monark may also refer to:

- Monark (video game), a 2021 video game
- Monark Equipment Corporation, a Filipino corporation
- Monark Springs, Missouri, U.S.
- Monark 540, a sailing yacht
- Monark 606, a sailing yacht
- International 806, also Monark 806, a sailing yacht
- Swedish sailing vessel Monark, sunk in May 1940 by HMS Severn (N57)
- Monark (podcaster), Brazilian podcaster, see Flow Podcast

== See also ==
- Monarch (disambiguation)
- Quebec City Monarks, the Quebec City Canadian football team
- Monarc Entertainment, an American record label
