= Joe English (sailor) =

Irish yachtsman and sailmaker

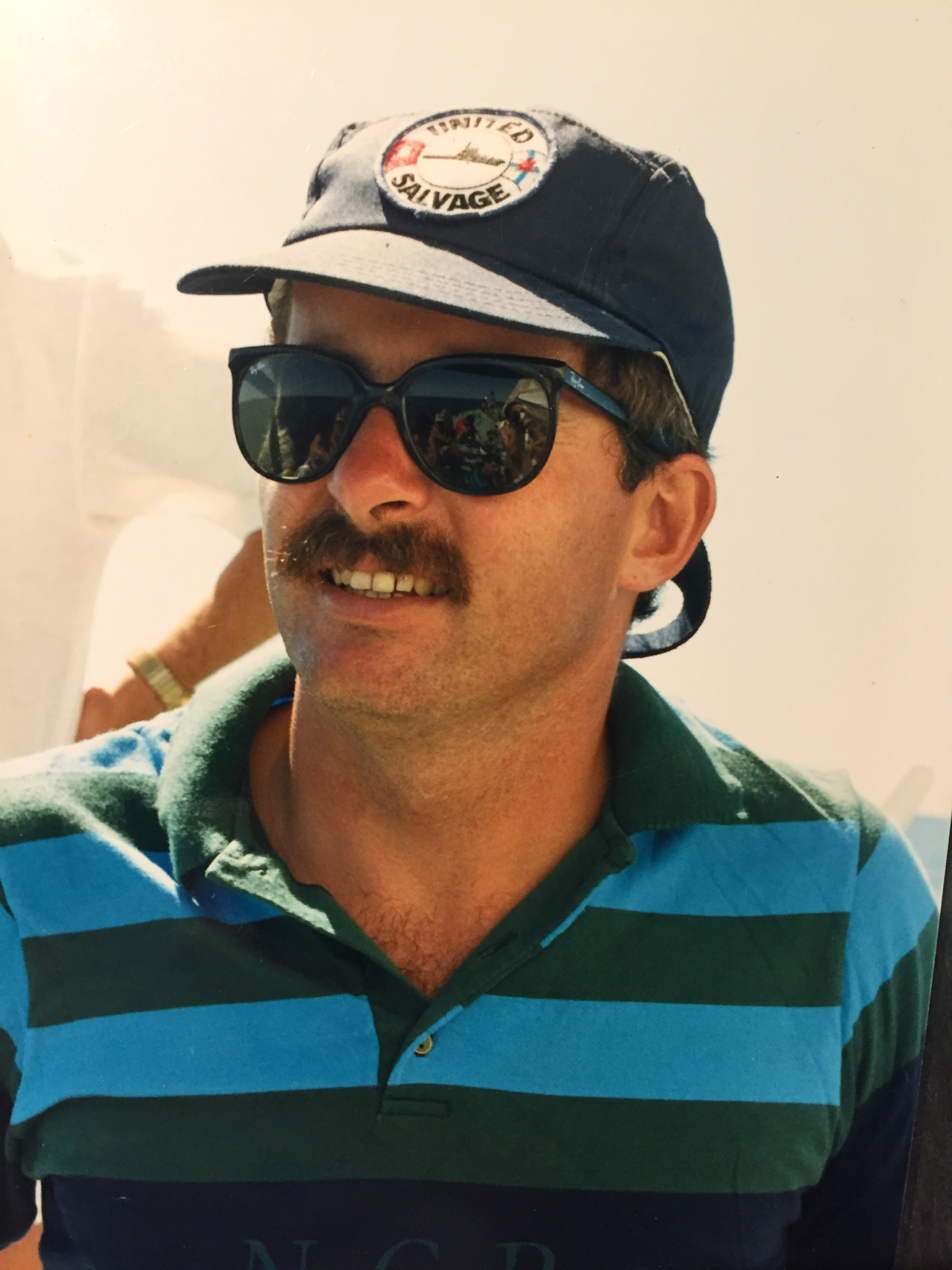

Personal information
- Born: 20 March 1956 Cork (city), Ireland
- Died: 4 November 2014 (aged 58) Crosshaven
- Spouse: April Murphy (m. 1987)

Sport
- Country: Ireland, Australia
- Sport: Sailing
- Events: America's Cup; Whitbread Round the World; Admiral's Cup; One Ton Cup; Sydney to Hobart Yacht Race; 12 Metre World Championship; Youth Sailing World Championships
- Club: Royal Cork Yacht Club; Royal Ocean Racing Club; Royal Irish Yacht Club; Royal Perth Yacht Club
- Team: NCB Ireland, South Australia (yacht), Tokio (yacht), Steak 'n' Kidney, Jameson 3, Ragamuffin

Joe English (20 March 1956 – 4 November 2014) was an Irish yachtsman, professional sailor and sailmaker. He competed at multiple world championship-level sailing events, including America's Cup, the Whitbread Round The World Race and Admiral's Cup race series. In 1989, English skippered Ireland's first entry to take part in the Whitbread Round the World Yacht Race.

Born into a seafaring family in Cobh, County Cork, English became an internationally successful yacht-racing captain and long-distance offshore competitor. English was involved in the development of the sport of sailing in Ireland, from an amateur hobby into a full-time profession. In the 2014 Irish Examiner obituary, he was described as The People's Skipper.

== Career ==
English had early success in the laser (dinghy) class. He won the Irish Yachting Association Junior Helmsman championship in 1974 and represented Ireland at the Youth World Sailing Championships in Largs, Scotland in 1975. English competed in the 1977 Admiral's Cup boat Big Apple, and on board Moonduster for the 1979 Fastnet race. After sailing aboard Blizzard in the 1979 Southern Cross Cup, English emigrated to Sydney, Australia. During the 1980s, he competed in international events including the Admirals Cup, Southern Cross Cup, the Clipper Cup, Sydney to Hobart Yacht Race, San Francisco Big Boat Series, Antigua Sailing Week Series and several Middle Sea Race events, including an ARC across the Atlantic. In 1981, along with friend Harold Cudmore, English won the Two Ton Cup and One Ton Cup aboard Hitchhiker and Justine 3 respectively. In 1988 English joined the British campaign in the 1988 Kenwood Cup in Hawaii. Later, English raced on Maxi yachts in Southern Hemisphere events such as the Sydney Hobart Race and the Southern Cross Series, including two Pacific Ocean passages as Skipper on Syd Fischer's Ragamuffin. English took part in various Admiral's Cup Teams. In addition to sailing on Irish entrants in 1977, and 1987, and Skippering Jameson 3 in 1993, he also competed with the Japanese in 1981 and onboard Dihard the Papua New Guinea entrance in the 1983 edition of the Admiral's Cup.

== America's Cup ==
In the America's Cup, English was involved in several Australian syndicates during the 1980s. In 1982, he joined Hugh Treharne's sailmaking team, to become part of the Australia II America's Cup Campaign. In 1986 he then joined the James Hardy backed 'South Australia' syndicate as a mainsheet trimmer for the defence of the 1987 America's Cup. South Australia (KA8) was a sister ship of Australia III, also designed by Ben Lexcen, although she performed quite differently in the 1986 12 Metre World Championships.

English then campaigned during the 1987 Defender Selection Series with Syd Fischer on Royal Sydney Yacht Squadron Steak 'n' Kidney . English was made an Australian citizen for his America's Cup exploits. In 2001 English took part in the America's Cup Jubilee regatta in Cowes, Isle of Wight for the UBS Jubilee Around the Island race.

== Whitbread Round the World Yacht Races ==
In 1989 English returned to Ireland to skipper the 82 foot, Ron Holland Maxi yacht NCB Ireland, Ireland's first entry in the 1989–1990 Whitbread Round the World Race. Irish national expectations for the success of the boat ran high, but race leg wins were eclipsed by other teams, including the Peter Blake (sailor) led Steinlager 2 entry that dominated the race. Gear and equipment failure dogged the Irish campaign. In the 31,500-mile race, noted for risk of loss of life and boat, NCB Ireland finished 11th out of a 23-strong fleet.

He then raced in the 1993–1994 Whitbread Round the World Race on ’Tokio’ with Chris Dickson (sailor) and latterly an advisor with Toshiba (yacht) for the 1997–1998 Whitbread Round the World Race which was led by Dennis Conner and Paul Standbridge. Toshiba's crew had 13 Whitbread and 28 America's Cup campaigns between them. English then subsequently became an adviser to the race management team and latterly served on the Whitbread executive committee until 2001 as it evolved into the Volvo Ocean Race.

In 1991 Ireland won the Southern Cross Cup when English skippered the yacht Extension to Victory. Businessman John Storey entered a three-boat Irish team to take part in the Southern Cross Series of that year, which was a programme of inshore and offshore races of varying lengths culminating in the 630-mile Sydney-Hobart Race. Ireland would also win the Sydney-Hobart on Storey's Atara.

In 1993 Ireland qualified a 3 boat team for the Admiral's Cup of that year, backed by John Storey and sponsored by Jameson Whiskey. Jameson 3 (Skippered by English) was the largest boat (50 feet) in the Irish team, but she was disqualified in race 6 and failed to finish race 7, the Fastnet. The team was bolstered by a strong showing by Jameson 2, which finished third overall, but was severely hampered by Jameson 1 (Skippered by Harold Cudmore) which had to retire from the regatta when she sank after striking Gurnard Ledge in the first race. The Irish team finished seventh overall.

In 1994, with members of the Royal Cork Yacht Club English led the development of the 1720 Sportsboat, one of the world's first boat classes aimed at delivering affordable and fun racing for local club-level sailors. From 1994 until 2004, 114 hulls were manufactured in O'Sullivan Marine Tralee, County Kerry. In 1997 he won the Round the Island Race in Cowes on his own 1720 Sportsboat. In 1999 English sailed aboard the Italian yacht Riveria di Rimini for the Middle Sea Race and subsequently placed second in the 1999 Fastnet Race. In 1999 English joined UK MacWilliam Sailmakers in Crosshaven, County Cork.

== Later life and illness ==
In 2007, aged 51, English was diagnosed with Alzheimer's disease and retired as a professional yachtsman. He was the youngest person in the country with the illness at the time. In 2008 English sailed on the TP52 Yacht Numbers with fellow America's Cup and Whitbread Veteran Brad Butterworth, during the 2008 Cork Week and eventual winner of their class. In 2011, English took part in the Ocean Legends Regatta in Alicante, Spain for the start of the 2011–2012 Volvo Ocean Race. Following the establishment of the Joe English Trust, with fellow America's Cup sailor, John Bertrand (sailor, born 1946), English became an advocate and campaigner for better solutions to treat and manage Alzheimer's disease, by meeting the President of Ireland and participating in an RTÉ Television programme in association with the Alzheimer Society of Ireland to highlight the cause and impact of the disease on sufferers and their families. He died on 4 November 2014 aged 58.

His daughter Aoife, is a world champion sailor. In 2008 she won the Student Yachting World Cup Sywoc in La Trinité-sur-Mer, France and in 2016 she won the Melges 24 Sportsboat World Championships in Miami, Florida . Aoife along with brother Robbie English are National and European 1720 Sportsboat Class Champions, a boat originally developed by their father.
