= 12 Metre World Championship =

12 Metre World Championship is a World Championship sailing regatta in the 12 Metre class organised by the International 12 Metre Association (Website).

== Editions ==
| Event | | | Host | | | Sailors | | | | | Ref. |
| Ed | Dates | Year | Club | Location | Nats | Fleet | Boats | Sailors | Nats | Cont | Ref. |
|---|---|---|---|---|---|---|---|---|---|---|---|
| 1 | | 1979 | | Brighton | United Kingdom | | | | | | |
| 2 | | 1982 | | Newport | United States | | | | | | |
| 4 | | 1984 | | Porto Cervo | Italy | | | | | | |
| 5 | 7–20 February | 1986 | | Fremantle | Australia | | | | | | |
| 6 | 25 June – 11 July | 1987 | Yacht Club Costa Smeralda | Porto Cervo | Italy | | | | | | |
| 7 | 19–26 June | 1988 | | Luleå | Sweden | | | | | | |
| 8 | 13–19 June | 1999 | | Saint-Tropez | France | | | | | | |
| 9 | 16–24 August | 2001 | Royal Yacht Squadron | Cowes | United Kingdom | | | | | | |
| 10 | | 2003 | | Newport | United States | | | | | | |
| 11 | 14–18 September | 2005 | | Newport | United States | | | | | | |
| 12 | 25–29 September | 2007 | | Cannes | France | | | | | | |
| 13 | 5–11 July | 2008 | | Glücksburg | Germany | | | | | | |
| 14 | 22–27 September | 2009 | | Newport | United States | | | | | | |
| 15 | 28 June – 3 July | 2011 | Flensburger Segel-Club | Flensburg | Germany | | | | | | |
| 16 | 13–19 July | 2014 | Real Club Náutico de Barcelona | Barcelona | Spain | | | | | | |
| 17 | 8–13 July | 2019 | | Newport | United States | | | | | | |
| 18 | 14–21 August | 2021 | Nyländska Jaktklubben (NJK) | Helsinki | Finland | | | | | | |
| 19 | | 2023 | Ida Lewis Yacht Club | | United States | | | | | | |
| 20 | | 2024 | Yacht Club Porquerolles | | France | | | | | | |
| 26 | | 2026 | Marstrands Segelsällskap & Göteborgs Seglarklubb | Marstrand | Sweden | Vintage | 8 | | | | |

== Medalists ==
| Year | Gold | Silver | Bronze |
|---|---|---|---|
| 1979 Brighton | Lionheart (GBR) | | |
| 1982 Newport | Victory '82 (GBR); Phil Crebbin; Harold Cudmore | Clipper (CAN); Terry McLaughlin | |
| 1984 Porto Cervo | Victory '83 (GBR) | | |
| 1986 Fremantle | Australia III (AUS) | | |
| 1987 Porto Cervo | Kiwi Magic (NZL) | | |
| 1988 Luleå | Kookaburra III (AUS); Peter Gilmour | | |
| 1991 San Diego | New Zealand (NZL) | | |
| 1999 St.-Tropez | Kiwi Magic (ITA) | | |
| 2001 Cowes | South Australia (AUS); Russell Coutts | New Zealand; Cameron Appleton | United States; John Edwin Bertrand; Cole Lissiman |
| 2005 Newport | Hissar - KZ5 (USA) Edgar Cato | Wright on White - KZ3 (BRA) Lars Grael | Kiwi Magic (USA) |
| 2007 Cannes | no champion decided | | |
| 2008 Flensburg | Nyala (ITA) | Trivia (GER) | Sphinx (GER) |
| 2009 Newport | Kiwi Magic (USA) | Wright on White - KZ3 (BRA) | U.S.A. - US61 (USA) |
| 2014 Barcelona | Nyala (ITA) | Trivia (GER) | Vanity V (DEN) |
| 2019 Newport | Legacy - KZ5 (DEN) Challenge 12 (USA); Columbia (USA); Nyala (ITA) | New Zealand - KZ3 (USA) Enterprise (USA); American Eagle (USA); Onawa (USA) | Kookaburra II (ITA); Courageous (USA); Nefertiti (USA); Blue Marlin (FIN) |
| 2021 Helsinki | Vim (DEN) | Blue Marlin (FIN) | Flica II (GER) |
