= 1974 Herbert Pell Cup =

Event information
- Type: Challenge race for America's Cup
- Dates: 1974
- Boats: Royal Perth Yacht Club (Australia); Cercle de la Voile de Paris (France)

Results
- Winner: Royal Perth Yacht Club (Australia)

Succession
- Previous: 1970 Herbert Pell Cup
- Next: 1977 Herbert Pell Cup

The 1974 Herbert Pell Cup was held in Newport, Rhode Island, United States in 1974. The winner, Southern Cross, was awarded the Herbert Pell Cup and went on to challenge for the 1974 America's Cup.

In a defenders selection series that was held simultaneously, four boats competed for the right to defend the America's Cup.

== The teams ==
=== Southern Cross (AUS) ===
Representing the Royal Perth Yacht Club, Southern Cross was owned by Alan Bond. The boat was skippered by James Hardy and the crew included tactician John Cuneo, mainsheet trimmer John Bertrand, grinder Rob Stirling, tactician Hugh Treharne, Noel Robins, Warren Jones, Jack Baxter, James Sargeant, John Longley and Kenneth Judge.

=== France (FRA) ===
France was owned by Marcel Bich, skippered by Jean Marie Le Guillot and represented Cercle de la Voile de Paris. The same boat competed in the 1970 Herbert Pell Cup.

== Matches ==
In a best of seven series, Southern Cross was undefeated and won the series 4–0.
