= 1977 Herbert Pell Cup =

3rd Herbert Pell Cup
Event information
- Type: Challenge race for America's Cup
- Dates: 1977
- Host city: Newport, Rhode Island
- Boats: Sun City Yacht Club (Australia); Royal Perth Yacht Club (Australia)

Results
- Winner: Sun City Yacht Club (Australia)

Succession
- Previous: 1977 Herbert Pell Cup
- Next: 1980 Herbert Pell Cup

The 1977 Herbert Pell Cup was held in Newport, Rhode Island, United States in 1977. The winner, Australia, was awarded the Herbert Pell Cup and went on to challenge for the 1977 America's Cup.

In a defenders selection series that was held simultaneously, three boats competed for the right to defend the America's Cup.

== Teams ==
=== Australia (AUS) ===
Representing the Sun City Yacht Club, Australia was owned by Alan Bond in his second challenge for the America's Cup. The boat was skippered by Noel Robins and the crew included John Bertrand, David Forbes, Michael Fletcher, Jack Baxter, John Longley, Scott McAllister and Kenneth Judge.

=== Gretel II (AUS) ===
Representing the Royal Perth Yacht Club, Gretel II had originally challenged for the 1970 America's Cup. The boat was skippered by Gordon Ingate.

=== France (FRA) ===
France was owned by Marcel Bich in his third consecutive challenge for the Cup. Bich had originally built a new boat, France II, however it proved slow in trials and Bich reverted to his original entry. The boat represented the Yacht Club of Hyéres and the afterguard included Bruno Trouble.

=== Sverige (SWE) ===
Sverige represented the Royal Gothenburg Yacht Club and was sponsored by Volvo. The team was skippered by Olympic silver medalist Pelle Petterson.

The team replaced traditional grinder stations with bicycle grinding stations below deck.

== Matches ==
Semi-finals
Australia | 4
France | 0
(Sweden) Sverige | 4
(Australia) Gretel II | 3

Final
Australia | 4
(Sweden) Sverige | 0
