= New Sweden (disambiguation) =

New Sweden was a Swedish colony along the Delaware River in North America.

New Sweden may also refer to:

- New Sweden, Idaho
  - New Sweden School
- New Sweden, Maine
- New Sweden Township, Nicollet County, Minnesota
- New Sweden, Texas, remnants of a Swedish settlement near Austin
- New Sweden (yacht), a 12-metre-class yacht

== See also ==
- New Sweden Farmstead Museum, New Jersey
- Sweden (disambiguation)
- Sverige (disambiguation)
