= 1970 Herbert Pell Cup =

1st Herbert Pell Cup
Event information
- Type: Challenge race for America's Cup
- Dates: September 1, 1970 – September 5, 1970
- Host city: Newport, Rhode Island
- Boats: Royal Sydney Yacht Squadron (Australia); Cercle de la Voile de Paris (France)

Results
- Winner: Royal Sydney Yacht Squadron (Australia)

Succession
- Next: 1974 Herbert Pell Cup

The 1970 Herbert Pell Cup was held in Newport, Rhode Island, United States in 1970. The winner, Gretel II, was awarded the Herbert Pell Cup and went on to challenge for the 1970 America's Cup. This was the first time a challenger's selection series was held, previously the New York Yacht Club had accepted a direct challenge for the America's Cup.

In a defenders selection series that was held simultaneously, three boats competed for the right to defend the America's Cup.

== Teams ==
=== Gretel II (AUS) ===
Representing the Royal Sydney Yacht Squadron, Gretel II was owned by Frank Packer. The boat was skippered by James Hardy and the crew included starting helmsman Martin Visser, William Fesq, David Forbes, Paul Salmon, John Anderson and port trimmer John Bertrand.

=== France (FRA) ===
France was owned by Marcel Bich and represented Cercle de la Voile de Paris. Pierre Delfour skippered the yacht and the crew included Éric Tabarly, Robin Fuger, Louis Noverraz and Bernard Dunand.

== Results ==
In a best of seven series, Gretel II was undefeated and won the series 4–0. Bich skippered his own yacht in the fourth and final match race.
