= 1980 America's Cup =

24th America's Cup
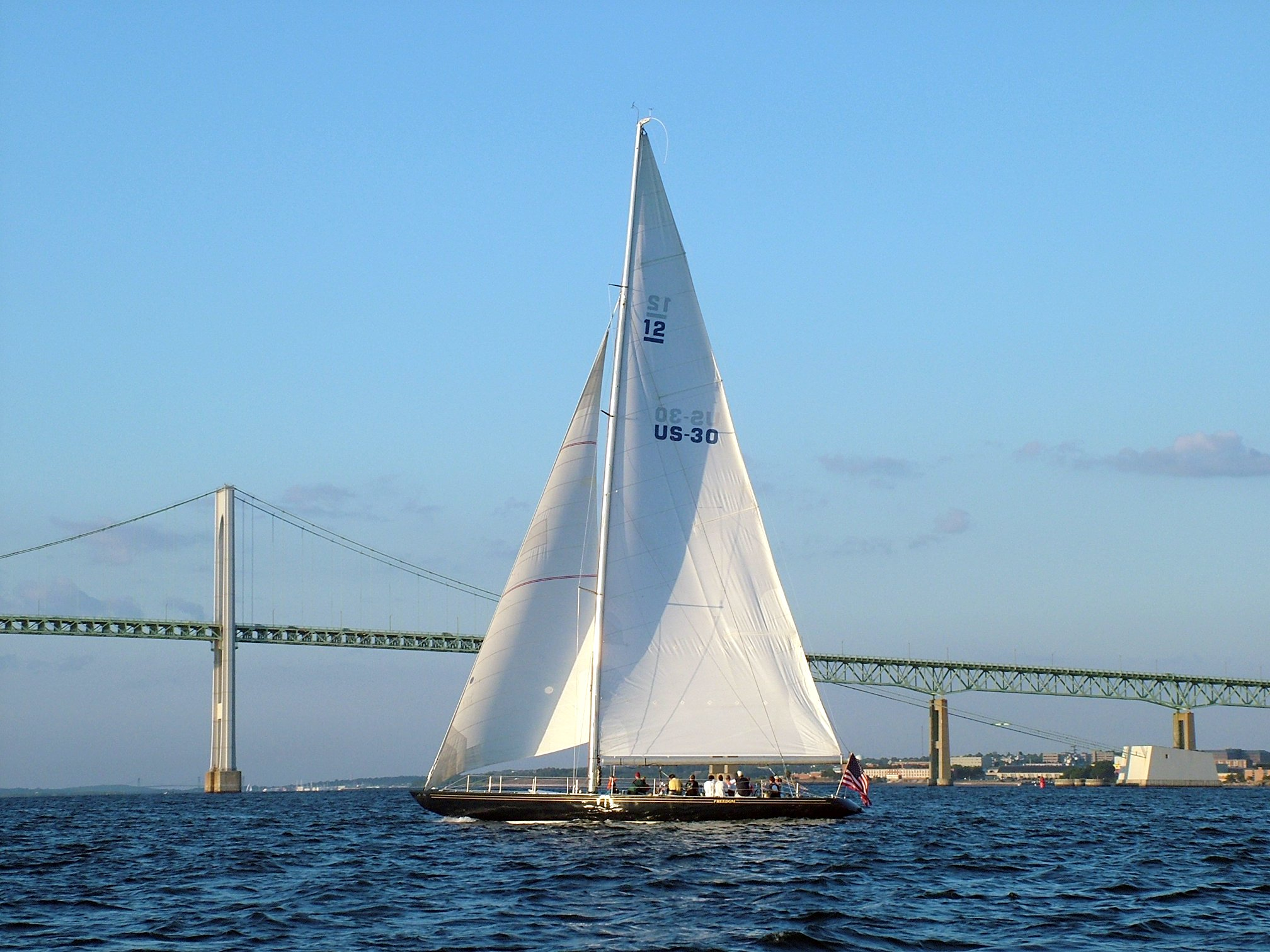
- Freedom

Defender United States
- Defender club: New York Yacht Club
- Yacht: Freedom

Challenger Australia
- Challenger club: Royal Perth Yacht Club
- Yacht: Australia

Competition
- Location: Newport, Rhode Island, United States
- Dates: September 1980
- Rule: 12-metre
- Winner: New York Yacht Club
- Score: 4–1

The 1980 America's Cup was held in September 1980 at Newport, Rhode Island. The US defender, Freedom, skippered by Dennis Conner, defeated the Australian challenger, Australia, skippered by James Hardy, four races to one. This was the last successful defense of the cup by the New York Yacht Club and the last defender designed by the naval architectural firm Sparkman & Stephens. It was the sixth unsuccessful challenge by Australia and the third by Alan Bond.

Freedom had beaten Courageous and Clipper to become the defender. Australia had beaten France III, Lionheart and Sverige to become the challenger.

== Crew ==
Freedom's crew included skipper Dennis Conner, navigator Halsey Herreshoff, tactician Dennis Durgan, trimmer John Marshall, grinders Rives Potts and Kyle Smith, mastman Robert "Bobbie" Campbell, pitman Donald Kohlmann, bowman Lexi Gahagan, Jonathan Wright and Tom Whidden.

Australia's crew included skipper James Hardy, Noel Robins, tactician Ben Lexcen, port trimmer John Bertrand, Scott McAllister, John Longley and Kenneth Judge.

== Results ==
| Team | 16 September 1980 | 19 September 1980 | 21 September 1980 | 23 September 1980 | 25 September 1980 | Pts |
|---|---|---|---|---|---|---|
| (United States) Freedom | W | +0:28 | W | W | W | 4 |
| Australia | +1:58 | W | +1:53 | +3:48 | +3:38 | 1 |

| 1st match | 16 September 1980 | (United States) Freedom | Dennis Conner | W | Report |
| 1st match | 16 September 1980 | Australia | James Hardy | +1:58 | Report |

| 2nd match | 19 September 1980 | (United States) Freedom | Dennis Conner | +0:28 | Report |
| 2nd match | 19 September 1980 | Australia | James Hardy | W | Report |

| 3rd match | 21 September 1980 | (United States) Freedom | Dennis Conner | W | Report |
| 3rd match | 21 September 1980 | Australia | James Hardy | +1:53 | Report |

| 4th match | 23 September 1980 | (United States) Freedom | Dennis Conner | W | Report |
| 4th match | 23 September 1980 | Australia | James Hardy | +3:48 | Report |

| 5th match | 25 September 1980 | (United States) Freedom | Dennis Conner | W | Report |
| 5th match | 25 September 1980 | Australia | James Hardy | +3:38 | Report |
