= South Australia (disambiguation) =

South Australia is a state in the southern central part of Australia.

South Australia may also refer to:

- Colony of South Australia (1836–1901), before it became a state
- South Australia (baseball team), baseball teams in Australia
- "South Australia" (song), Australian folk song
- South Australia (yacht), former name of New Sweden, Australian 12 metre class yacht

== See also ==
- Southern Australia
