= Lexcen =

Lexcen may refer to:

- Ben Lexcen, Australian yachtsman and marine architect
- 18747 Lexcen, main-belt asteroid
- Toyota Lexcen, badge-engineered version of the Holden Commodore
