= Monark 606 =

Finnish keelboat

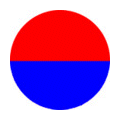
- Class symbol

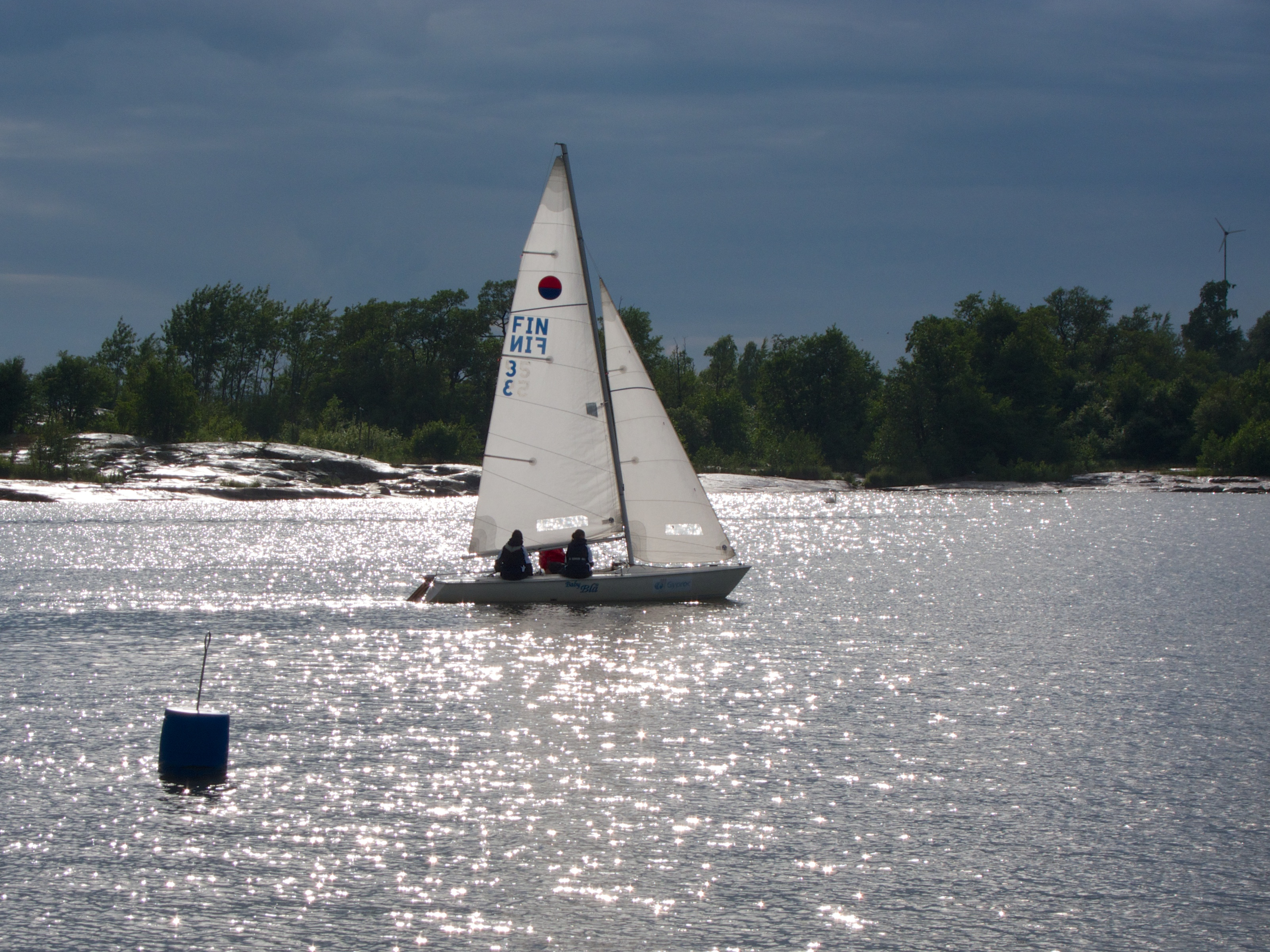
- 606 sailing at Särkkä outside of Helsinki, Finland

Development
- Designer: Pelle Petterson
- Year: 1969-98
- Builder: Monark Crescent AB

Boat
- Crew: 1 - 3 people
- Draft: 0.90 m (3.0 ft)

Hull
- Type: Monohull
- Construction: GRP
- Hull weight: 555 kg (1,224 lb)
- LOA: 6.06 m (19.9 ft)
- LWL: 5.50 m (18.0 ft)
- Beam: 1.86 m (6.1 ft)

Hull appendages
- Keel: Fin keel
- Rudder: Transom hung

Rig
- Rig type: Bermuda rig with a single spreader

Sails
- Mainsail area: 10.5 m^{2} (113 sq ft)
- Jib/genoa area: 5.5 m^{2} (59 sq ft)
- Spinnaker area: 22.0 m^{2} (237 sq ft)

Monark 606 is a 6.06-metre (19.9 ft) sailboat class designed by Pelle Petterson and built in about 800 copies.

It is a small type of lightweight racing keelboat and has a combination of stability and characteristics of the dinghy, a flat bottom, a high-performance sail area, and a high power-to-weight ratio.

The 606 has a large cockpit relative to its size, with the rudder positioned on the transom.

National championships are regularly held in Scandinavia and Finland.

== See also ==
- Monark 540
- Monark 806
