= Sverige (disambiguation) =

Sverige is the Swedish-language name for Sweden.

Sverige may also refer to:

- HSwMS Sverige, a Swedish coastal defence ship used by the Swedish Navy, 1915–1953
- Sverige, a 12 Metre-class yacht
- Sverige-class coastal defence ship, a class of ships in the Swedish Navy
- "Sverige", a song by Basshunter from LOL <(^^,)>
- "Sverige", a song by Kent from Vapen & ammunition
- "Sverige", a hymn with lyrics by Verner von Heidenstam; see "Du gamla, du fria"
- "Sverige (Jag Är Insnöad På Östfronten)", a song by The Stranglers, non-album single from Black and White

== See also ==
- Sweden (disambiguation)
