= Maxi 77 =

1970s Swedish recreational keelboat

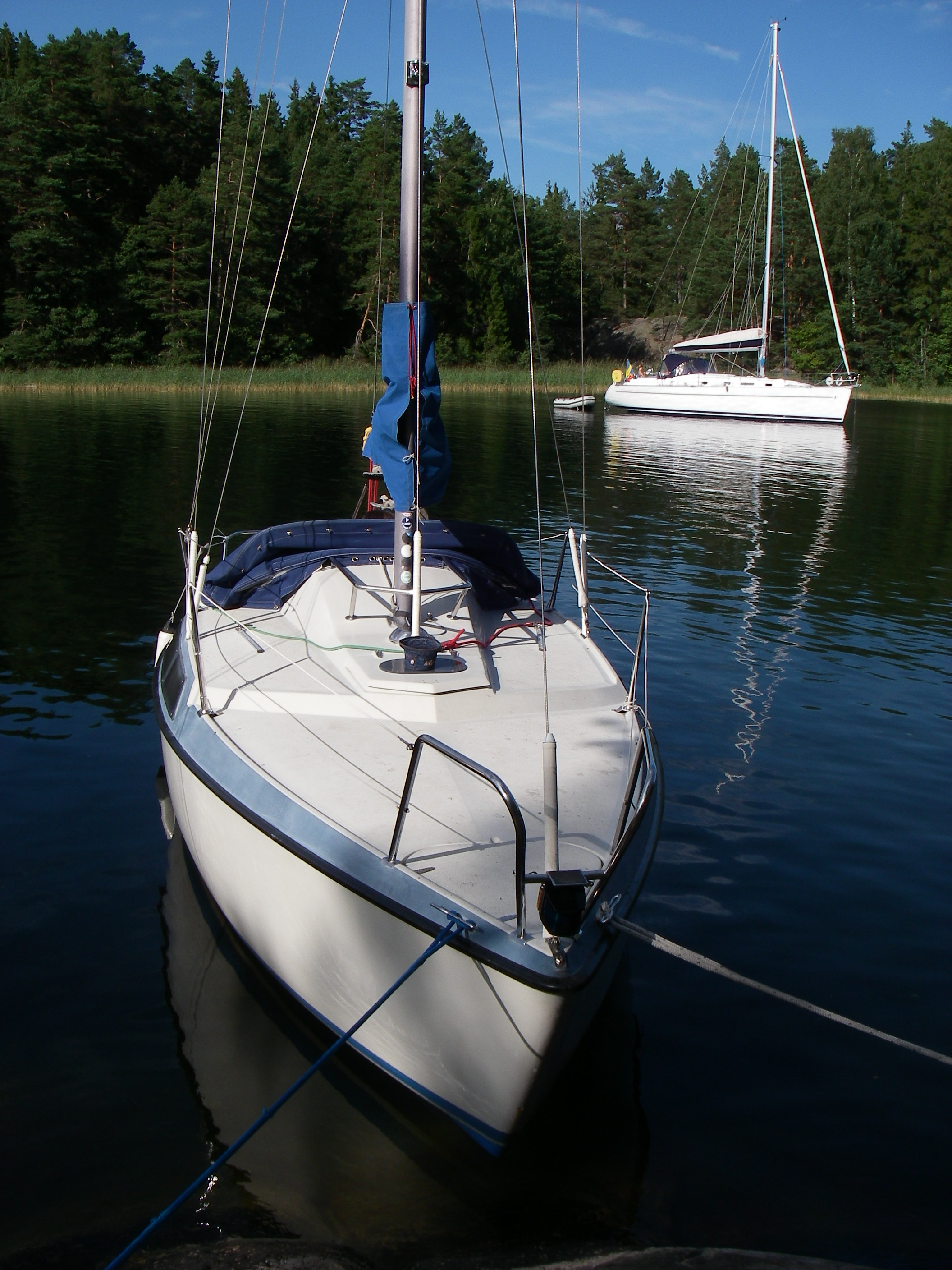
- Maxi 77 in 2010.

Development
- Designer: Pelle Petterson
- Year: 1972
- Builder: Mölnlycke Marin

Boat
- Displacement: 2,000 kg (4,400 lb)
- Draft: 1.50 m (4.9 ft)

Hull
- LOA: 7.62 m (25.0 ft)
- LWL: 6.75 m (22.1 ft)
- Beam: 2.50 m (8.2 ft)

The Maxi 77 is a 7.62-metre (25.0 ft) recreational keelboat designed by Pelle Petterson. About 3,750 were built by Mölnlycke Marin between 1972 and 1982.
