= Rachael Taylor =

Australian actress and model (born 1984)

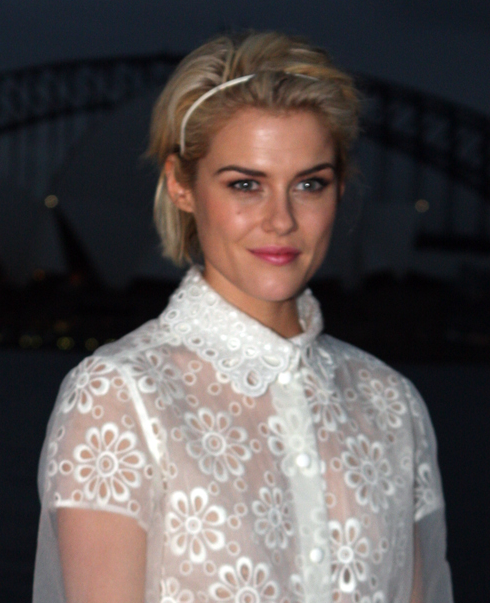
- Taylor in 2012
- Born: Rachael May Taylor; 11 July 1984 (age 42); Launceston, Tasmania, Australia
- Occupations: Actress, model
- Years active: 2004–present

Rachael May Taylor (born 11 July 1984) is an Australian actress and model. She began her career as a model before transitioning to acting, gaining early recognition for the Australian television series headLand (2005–2006). She subsequently appeared in the films Man-Thing (2005), See No Evil (2006), Transformers (2007), Bottle Shock (2008), Shutter (2008), Cedar Boys (2009), Splinterheads (2009), Red Dog (2011), The Darkest Hour (2011) and Any Questions for Ben? (2012).

Taylor is best known for portraying Trish Walker in the Marvel Cinematic Universe television series Jessica Jones (2015–2019), Luke Cage (2016) and The Defenders (2017). She also portrayed Dr. Lucy Fields on Grey's Anatomy (2011), an Angel in Charlie's Angels (2011), Jane Van Veen in 666 Park Avenue (2012–2013) and Susie Dunn in the NBC action/thriller series Crisis (2014).

== Early life ==
Rachael May Taylor was born on 11 July 1984 in Launceston, Tasmania. Her English parents, Christine and Nigel Taylor, emigrated from Dorset and Lancashire respectively and met in Tasmania.

Taylor attended Trevallyn Primary School and Riverside High School. She moved to Sydney at the age of 16 to become an actress, though later returned to Launceston to complete her high school education. She studied history and politics at the University of Sydney before leaving in 2006.

== Career ==
Taylor modelled as a teenager, and reached the state finals of Miss Teen Tasmania and Miss Universe/Miss World. In 1998, she won the title of Miss Teen Tasmania. She stated in 2015: "I don't think that was a particularly healthy environment for a 14-year-old. I think women are asked to consider their beauty too much."

She made her acting debut in The Mystery of Natalie Wood, a 2004 television serial directed by Peter Bogdanovich. She appeared in a number of American productions – such as the television film Dynasty: The Making of a Guilty Pleasure (2005) (where she played Catherine Oxenberg), and the horror movies Man-Thing (2005) and See No Evil (2006).

Taylor played Sasha Forbes on the short-lived Australian drama series headLand. On 3 April 2006, she was nominated for a Logie Award for Most Popular New Female Talent for her role on headLand.

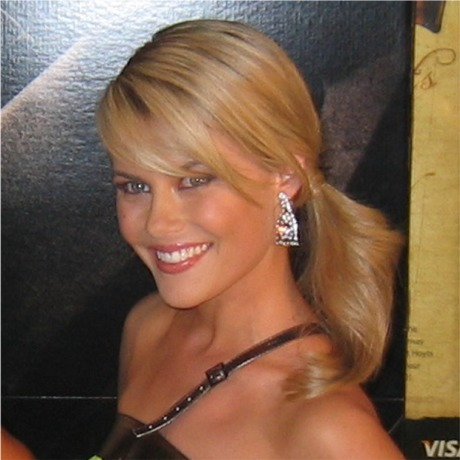
Taylor at the premiere of Transformers in Sydney, 2007

Her most prominent role to date was as Maggie Madsen, a signals analyst, in the 2007 Transformers, where she appeared alongside Shia LaBeouf and Megan Fox. Taylor confirmed that she would not be returning for the Transformers sequel. In 2008, Taylor scored a starring role in the US horror-thriller Shutter, a remake of the 2004 Thai film of the same name opposite Joshua Jackson. Despite mixed reviews, the film was a box-office success.

In 2009, she completed the Australian feature Cedar Boys and starred in the comedy Splinterheads. In 2010, she starred alongside Alex Dimitriades in the Australian romantic drama Summer Coda. She has also signed to the HBO comedy series Washingtonienne and Melt, an Australian production. Taylor began a recurring role on Grey's Anatomy as Dr. Lucy Fields, an obstetrician and maternal-fetal fellow.

In 2011, Taylor joined the cast of the short-lived remake of the television series Charlie's Angels. Also in 2011, she had a major role in the film Red Dog and starred in the Russian science-fiction thriller film The Darkest Hour, directed by filmmaker Chris Gorak.

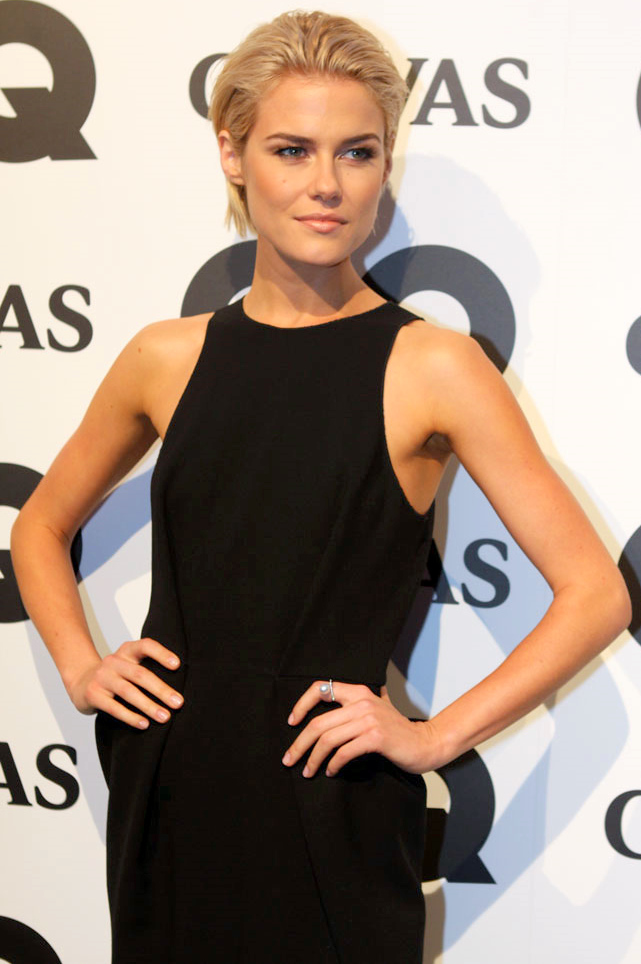
Taylor at the 2011 GQ Men of the Year Awards

Taylor had a key supporting role in the 2012 Australian comedy Any Questions for Ben?, created by Working Dog Productions. Although the film performed disappointingly at the box-office and received lukewarm reviews, Taylor was praised for her role. Leigh Paatsch in the Herald-Sun wrote "Taylor exudes a warmth and assurance (in her performance). It is a shame she is missing in action for lengthy spells in the picture."

From 2012 to 2013, Taylor starred in the new drama 666 Park Avenue. She was next cast in the 2014 NBC series Crisis, which ran for one season. In 2015, Taylor starred in Jessica Jones as the titular character's best friend Trish Walker. She would go on to reprise the role in a voiceover cameo in Luke Cage in 2016, in The Defenders in 2017, a second season of Jessica Jones in 2018, and the series' final season in 2019.

In 2014, Taylor played a supporting role in the thriller The Loft, a remake of the 2008 original, alongside fellow Australian Isabel Lucas. In 2016, Taylor portrayed the character Rachel Hill in the crime drama film Gold. In 2018, Taylor appeared in the Australian comedy-drama film Ladies in Black.

In 2019, Taylor appeared in Finding Steve McQueen as Molly Murphy, where she starred alongside Travis Fimmel, Forest Whitaker, and William Fichtner.

== Personal life ==
Taylor began dating Australian actor Matthew Newton in 2009, and The Daily Telegraph reported that the couple became engaged in early 2010. In August 2010, Taylor took out an Apprehended Violence Order (AVO) against Newton. This followed two domestic violence incidents at a hotel in Rome where Newton allegedly "punched Taylor in the face before being sedated by ambulance officers"; during the incident Taylor suffered a concussion and a sprained jaw. In 2014, Taylor partnered with White Ribbon Australia to advocate to end men's violence against women.

== Filmography ==
=== Film ===
Year	Title	Role	Notes
2005	Man-Thing	Teri Elizabeth Richards	
2006	See No Evil	Zoe Warner	
2007	Transformers	Maggie Madsen	
2008	Shutter	Jane Shaw	
2008	Bottle Shock	Sam Fulton	
2008	Deception	Woman In Hallway	
2009	Cedar Boys	Amie	
2009	Splinterheads	Galaxy	
2009	Ghost Machine	Jess	
2010	Providence Park	Bicycle Girl	Short film
2010	Summer Coda	Heidi	
2011	Red Dog	Nancy Grey	
2011	The Darkest Hour	Anne	
2012	Any Questions for Ben?	Alex	
2014	The Loft	Anne Morris	
2016	ARQ	Hannah	
2016	Gold	Rachel Hill	
2016	Wig Shop	Lili	Short film
2018	White Orchid	Jessica	
2018	Ladies in Black	Fay Baines	
2019	Finding Steve McQueen	Molly Murphy	

=== Television ===
Year	Title	Role	Notes
2004	The Mystery of Natalie Wood	Maryann Marinkovich	TV film
2005	Dynasty: The Making of a Guilty Pleasure	Catherine Oxenberg	TV film
2005	Hercules	Nemean lion / Sphinx	TV miniseries
2005	McLeod's Daughters	Natalie Louise Brown	Episode: "Old Flames"
2005–2006	headLand	Sasha Forbes	Main role; 58 episodes
2009	Washingtonienne	Jackie	Unsold TV pilot
2011	Grey's Anatomy	Dr. Lucy Fields	Recurring role; 8 episodes
2011	Charlie's Angels	Abigail "Abby" Simpson	Main role; 8 episodes
2012–2013	666 Park Avenue	Jane Van Veen	Main role; 13 episodes
2014	Crisis	Agent Susie Dunn	Main role; 13 episodes
2015–2019	Jessica Jones	Patricia "Trish" Walker / Hellcat	Main role; 38 episodes
2016	Luke Cage	Patricia "Trish" Walker / Hellcat	Episode: "Suckas Need Bodyguards" Voiceover cameo
2017	The Defenders	Patricia "Trish" Walker / Hellcat	Main role, miniseries; 4 episodes
2017	House of Bond	Diana Bliss	Miniseries; 2 episodes
2024	Hacks	Alexis	Episode: "Just for Laughs"
