= Ben Lexcen =

Australian marine architect and Olympic sailor (1936–1988)

Personal information
- Full name: Benjamin Lexcen
- Nationality: Australian
- Born: Robert Clyde Miller; 19 March 1936 Boggabri, New South Wales, Australia
- Died: 1 May 1988 (aged 52) Manly, New South Wales, Australia
- Height: 1.83 m (6.0 ft)

Sailing career
- Sport: Sailing
- Class: Soling
- Updated on 1 March 2014

Benjamin Lexcen AM (born Robert Clyde Miller, 19 March 1936 – 1 May 1988) was an Australian yachtsman and marine architect. He is famous for the winged keel design applied to Australia II which, in 1983, became the first non-American challenger to win the prestigious America's Cup in the competition's 132-year history.

== Early life ==
Lexcen was born in the small town of Boggabri, New South Wales, on 19 March 1936. After his parents, Edward William Miller, a labourer, and Ethel Doreen, née Green, abandoned him as a child, he stayed briefly at Boys' Town Engadine before going to his grandfather at Newcastle.

Miller left school at age 14 to pursue a locomotive mechanic's apprenticeship but soon found his attention turning to sailboats. He designed his first sailboat, The Comet, at age 16 with his friend William Bennett in Hamilton, NSW and began to make a name for himself in local competition. Miller did his sailmaking apprenticeship with Norman Wright in Queensland.

Miller's designs were highly innovative. The Taipan, his entry in the 1960 JJ Giltinan International Trophy, started the modern era of the 18ft skiff class. Miller won the competition in 1961 with his next entry, the Venom. With friend Craig Whitworth, he founded a boat building, sailmaking, and ship chandlery firm, Miller and Whitworth, and designed boats part time.

One of Miller's lasting early design successes was of the single-handed dinghy that became the International Contender. In 1967, it was selected in multi-boat trials as a potential Olympic successor to the Finn dinghy. The Contender was awarded International status in 1968 and now has fleets in more than twelve countries. His keelboat designs of the early 1970s featured clean, easily driven hulls and a relatively small sail area. He had great success with a series of these designs starting with the innovative Ginkgo, of which smaller derivatives won honours in the Sydney to Hobart Yacht Race.

Miller competed in a Soling keelboat at the 1972 Munich Olympics representing Australia in sailing with Denis O'Neil and Ken Berkeley as fellow crew members.

== America's Cup ==
Miller was commissioned by Alan Bond to build Apollo, an ocean racer. This partnership continued when Bond first challenged for the America's Cup in 1974 with the Miller-designed 12-metre class yacht Southern Cross, named for the southern hemisphere constellation. Their challenge for the Cup was unsuccessful, but Miller was kept on as the designer for future yachts, which were designed in accordance with the 12-metre class rules used by the competition at the time.

During the first years of his partnership with Bond, Miller left Miller and Whitworth, but the company retained his name. Soon after the 1974 Cup challenge, Miller changed his name to Benjamin Lexcen. Keen to prevent any confusion surrounding his name and future business interests, he asked a friend who worked for Reader's Digest to determine the least common surname within their membership. The result was Lexcen. "Ben" was the name of his dog.

Bond challenged for America's cup in 1977 with the 12 Metre Australia, designed by Lexcen and Johan Valentijn, against media mogul Ted Turner, and again in 1980 with a Lexcen-modified Australia against Dennis Conner, losing both times.

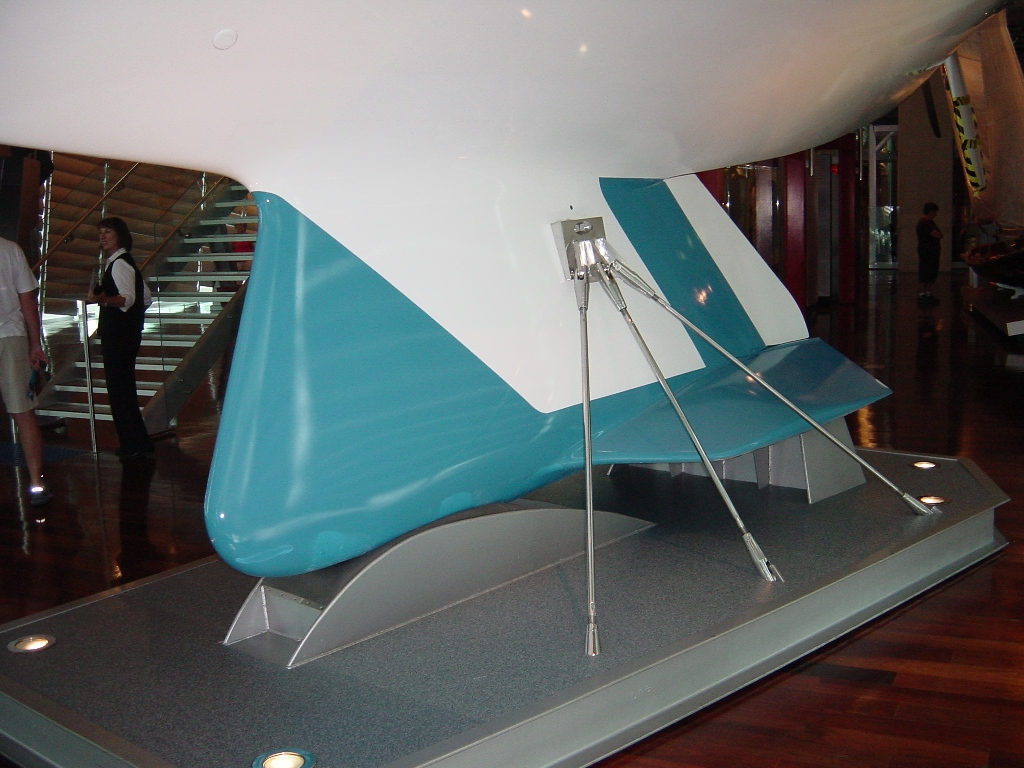
The winged keel of Australia II

After the 1980 challenge, Lexcen realised they would need a superior boat to win against the defenders' 100+ years of America's Cup experience. His next design, for the Australia II, featured a host of advanced design innovations, including a revolutionary winged keel engineered to lower drag, increase stability, and make the boat more maneuverable. The design reduced tip vortex, a turbulence caused by the pressure differential between the low-pressure windward and high-pressure leeward sides of conventional keels. The new keel was controversial; Cup competitors protested, questioning whether its design, alleged to have been based on engineering and testing by a Dutch tank testing facility, disqualified the vessel from Cup competition based on rules requiring each competing boat have a single country of origin.

Australia II's winged keel and hull design featured the shortest waterline length ever measured on a 12-metre. To yachtsmen accustomed to seeing racing yachts out of the water, Australia II is striking. Its conventional long, slim topsides flare down to a short waterline hinting at the dramatic, minimal, slippery underwater hull shape which was fast to turn as well as easily driven and quick to accelerate. Ben often remarked that Australia II is a whole boat, not just a keel. The New York Yacht Club, holders of the Cup, formally protested both that Australia II was not a legal 12 metre boat, and that the design itself was not of Australian origin. The ruling arrived at on the boat confirmed that Australia II complied with both the 12-metre class and the America's Cup rules. The questions on her design origin were not formally answered at the time, but the controversy re-emerged in 2009 (see Later claims of Dutch Design for details). Claims that Peter van Oossanen was the designer of the Australia II's keel rather than Ben have been strongly rejected by John Bertrand and by John Longley, an important member of the Australia II team using documentary evidence.

The 1983 America's Cup saw Lexcen's Australia II, with John Bertrand at the helm, take on the NYYC skipper Dennis Conner and the defender yacht, Liberty. The Australians were sure they had a fast boat. Australia II had dominated the challenger eliminations just as Liberty had dominated the closer defender trials, honing her tuning and performance. But mechanical failures on Australia II and skillful sailing by the defenders caused Australia II to fall behind, losing the first two races. Australia II stormed back to take three of the next four. Dennis Conner had creatively registered three different configurations (sail area, spar length and ballast) for Liberty and he successfully called for lay days to choose advantageous weather to suit his most competitive versions of the boat. This was the first time in history that the series depended on the result of the last race, and the pressure of defending the Cup was now firmly on Liberty. In the deciding race on 26 September, Conner prepared Liberty in her very competitive light weather configuration with big sail area and low weight. Australia II won the start and held an early lead but was overtaken by Liberty which built up a substantial margin. At the start of the penultimate leg (a square run) the breeze was very light and Liberty was vulnerable. Liberty chose a starboard tack leg and declined to cover Australia II which allowed them to run deeper and faster assisted by breeze and windshifts allowing Australia II to overtake the Americans by the leeward mark. Liberty then engaged Australia II in a spectacular tacking duel with nearly 50 tacks and a number of faked "dummy" tacks trying to break the Australians' cover. Australia II held on until both boats reached the starboard layline in amongst the spectator fleet and tacked several boat lengths ahead of Liberty and sailed to the finish to take the race. Australia II became the first challenger to wrest the Cup from the United States since its inception in 1870. Lexcen was made a Member of the Order of Australia for his contributions to the winning design.

Lexcen was commissioned by Bond once again in 1986 to design a defender for the 1987 America's Cup. He designed Australia III and Australia IV for Bond's two boat defense program. Australia IV was ultimately defeated by the Iain Murray designed and skippered Kookaburra III in the Defender Trials. Steve Ward (builder of all four "Australias") maintains that Lexcen's design was not at fault but that Australia IV was uncompetitive due to last minute design modifications ordered by the upper echelons of Bond Corporation. Australia IV was originally designed to be longer on the waterline with less sail area similar to Conner's winning design. Australia competed in the Cup without a Lexcen designed boat for the first time in ten years. Kookaburra III lost in the finals to Dennis Conner and his American challenger, Stars & Stripes 87, 4 races to nil.

== Death ==
Lexcen died suddenly in Manly, New South Wales on 1 May 1988, of a heart attack at 52 years of age. He is buried at Frenchs Forest Cemetery located in Davidson, New South Wales.

== Legacy ==
In 1989, the Toyota Lexcen was released by Toyota Australia in Ben Lexcen's honour. The car was a rebadged Holden VN Commodore and was built in Australia under the Button Plan. Production lasted until 1997.

In 1988 the University of New South Wales named its newly created sports scholarships the Ben Lexcen Sports Scholarships. These scholarships were the first sports scholarships to be offered by an Australian university.

In 2006, Lexcen was posthumously inducted into the America's Cup Hall of Fame.

== In popular culture ==
In the 1986 miniseries The Challenge, Lexcen was portrayed by John Clayton. In the 2016 television series House of Bond, he was played by Paul Gleeson.

In 2022, Netflix released Untold: The Race of the Century, a film about the Australian team's win in the 1983 race, including footage of Lexcen.

== See also ==
- Sailing yachts designed by Ben Lexcen
