= The Challenge (miniseries) =

- Written by: David Phillips
- Directed by: Chris Thomson
- Starring: John Wood; John Diedrich; John Clayton
- Country of origin: Australia
- Original language: English

Production
- Producers: Tristram Miall; Bob Loader
- Running time: 287 mins
- Budget: $4.5 million

Original release
- Release: 29 December 1986 – 24 March 1987

The Challenge is a 1986 Australian mini series based on the 1983 America's Cup.

It was one of the first television productions by Roadshow Coote and Carroll. The series sold well overseas and screened in the UK.

== Cast ==
- John Wood as Alan Bond
- John Diedrich aa John Bertrand
- John Clayton as Ben Lexcen
- Bartholomew John as John Longley
- Richard Moir as Warren Jones
- Lorraine Bayly as Eileen Bond
- Jacki Weaver as Rasa Bertrand
- Tim Pigott-Smith as Peter de Savary
- Nicholas Hammond as Dennis Conner
- Ray Barrett as Bob McCullough
- Peter Phelps as Will Baillieu
- Ian Gilmour as Scott McAllister
- Kelly Dingwall as Damian Fewster
- Gus Mercurio as Vic Romagna
- Liddy Clark
