= Diana Bliss =

Australian theatre producer (1954–2012)

- Born: Diana Gwenyth Bliss; 11 November 1954; Temora, New South Wales, Australia
- Died: 28 January 2012 (aged 57); Cottesloe, Western Australia
- Education: East Sydney Technical College
- Occupation: Theatre producer
- Spouse: Alan Bond (m. 1995)

Diana Gwenyth Bliss (11 November 1954 – 28 January 2012) was an Australian theatre producer.

== Early life ==
Bliss was born on 11 November 1954 in Temora, New South Wales. Her father, Douglas Bliss, was a Methodist minister in the nearby town of Ardlethan. The family later moved to Beecroft.

== Career and marriage ==
Bliss studied fashion design at the East Sydney Technical College and subsequently became an air hostess for Qantas. She went on to work in public relations at the Parmelia Hilton Hotel in Perth, where she first met businessman Alan Bond in 1979.

In 1989 Bliss was involved in an insider trading investigation when she purchased 500,000 shares in Petro Energy at eight cents per share, just before Bond Corporation launched a takeover bid paying 14 cents per share.

Bliss became a successful theatrical producer, working in the West End, New York and Sydney. Her notable projects included Our Country's Good in 1991 and The Holy Terror in New York in 1993.Our Country's Good won the Laurence Olivier BBC Award in 1988 for best play. The Broadway production was nominated for six Tony awards. Wayne Harrison of the Sydney Theatre Company (STC) said "Bliss was instrumental in bringing several theatrical properties quickly to the STC, the most notable being Oleanna, which became one of the great STC successes of the 1990s. Without her intervention, that important piece of 'of the moment' theatre wouldn't have happened in Sydney, and subsequently around Australia." Bliss produced Tracy Letts' Killer Joe in 1996.

On 15 April 1995, Bliss married Alan Bond at Sydney's Museum of Contemporary Art Australia. Bond had divorced his first wife, Eileen, in 1992.

== Death ==
During the night of 28 January 2012, Bliss was found dead in the swimming pool at the family home in Cottesloe. She had been receiving treatment for depression and had attempted suicide on two previous occasions. She left a suicide note thanking her family and friends for their understanding and support.

Bliss' funeral was conducted on 4 February 2012 in the chapel of Christ Church Grammar School.

== Television portrayals ==
Bliss was the subject of a 1997 episode entitled The Parson's Daughter, on the documentary television series Australian Story. In 2012, following her suicide, Australian Story aired a new, two-episode update of Bliss’ story, entitled Her Hour Upon the Stage.

Bliss was portrayed by actress Rachael Taylor in the 2017 television miniseries House of Bond.
