= 1969 Star World Championship =

Event title
- Edition: 46th
- Host: San Diego Yacht Club

Event details
- Venue: San Diego
- Yachts: Star
- Titles: 1

Competitors
- Competitors: 88
- Competing nations: 11

Results
- (gold) Gold: (Sweden) Petterson & Schröder
- (silver) Silver: (United States) Blackaller & Mull
- (bronze) Bronze: (United States) North & Barrett

The 1969 Star World Championship was held in San Diego, United States in 1969, organised by San Diego Yacht Club.

== Results ==
Results of individual races
Pos	Boat name	Crew	Country	I	II	III	IV	V	Tot
Gold medal	Humbug VII	Pelle Petterson; Ulf Schröder	Sweden	3	9	2	7	1	202
Silver medal	Good Grief!	Tom Blackaller; Gary Mull	United States	9	2	8	4	5	197
Bronze medal	North Star	Lowell North; Peter Barrett	United States	10	5	10	5	3	192
4	Dingo	Ding Schoonmaker; Earl Elms	United States	13	1	7	9	6	189
5	Blitzkrieg	G. S. Friedrichs; George Mejlaender	United States	11	17	6	2	10	179
6	Blott X	Stig Wennerström; Sture Christensson	Sweden	2	15	11	11	12	174
7	Frolic	Bill Buchan Jr. Carl F. Sutter	United States	4	6	3	41	1	169
8	Ariel	Alan C. Holt; Richard Gates	United States	1	4	4	30	17	169
9	Hannah	Barton S. Beek; Kent D. Edler	United States	8	7	16	12	13	169
10	Swingin' Star	Eugene Corley; Donald Trask	United States	12	11	22	1	11	168
11	Conqueror	William F. Gerard; Sheridah Gerard	United States	17	13	1	20	29	145
12	Chilly	Uwe Mares; Kai Krüger	West Germany	21	18	19	18	8	141
13	Vasa II	Frank Zagarino; William Beeman	United States	20	3	21	28	14	139
14	Zucker Kaninchen	Chuck Lewsadder; William Munster	United States	6	8	14	16	WDR	136
15	Desiree	Angelo Marino; Arnoldo Panico	Italy	15	10	37	6	26	131
16	Glassbox	Malin Burnham; John Burnham	United States	7	27	39	8	15	129
17	Sweet Bippy	John W. Bennett; Michael Shanahan	United States	14	16	25	39	4	127
18	Noncents	Hartman Bogumil; H. J. Lange	West Germany	30	23	12	14	22	124
19	Goldfever	Sune Carlsson; Bo Wickström	Sweden	23	19	20	35	9	119
20	Katastrof	John Albrechtson; John Colucci	Sweden	22	28	24	10	25	116
21	Creepy IV	Foster Clarke; James Gannon	Bahamas	5	21	40	21	27	111
22	Blue Moon	Börje Larsson; Göran Tell	Sweden	28	14	26	29	18	110
23	Humberta	Luigi Croce; Luigi Saidelli	Italy	36	29	5	15	31	109
24	Pimm	Walter von Hütschler; Jorge Carneiro	Brazil	16	30	27	17	28	107
25	Fiamma	Oskar A. Meier; Daniel Wyss	Switzerland	27	12	38	34	7	107
26	Leprechaun	Steve Andrews; Charles Findlay	United States	24	25	33	23	16	104
27	Riff Raff	Alan Raffee; Dennis Conner	United States	35	24	9	24	36	97
28	Scandale	H. Zachariassen; A. van Eicken	West Germany	18	20	42	31	24	90
29	Persistent	Ralph de Luca; David Croshede	United States	31	22	29	33	23	87
30	Chatterbox	A. Osterwalder; Gubi Leeman	Switzerland	25	37	32	26	20	85
31	Evening Star	Larry Whipple; Gary Philbrick	United States	39	38	30	13	21	84
32	Noncents Too	Carlo Rolandi; Alfonso Marino	Italy	WDR	WDR	17	3	32	83
33	Chantal	Jurg Christen; R. Giesbrecht	Switzerland	32	36	34	25	19	79
34	Colleen VI	Thomas C. Nylund; Denes Kalotay	United States	33	WDR	13	27	30	77
35	Hopeful	Roberto Mieres; Jorge Caride	Argentina	40	26	18	32	34	75
36	Gusto	William J. Hock; Denis Heywood	Australia	29	31	35	22	37	71
37	Aquarius	S. Prinsenberg; Dirk Prinsenberg	Canada	19	32	28	42	38	66
38	Scheherezade	K. J. W. Stump; M. S. W. Young	Australia	26	33	31	40	40	55
39	Ringo	William Cowles; L. Ralph Smith	United States	38	40	23	36	39	49
40	Magic	Robert Rodgers; Donald Casey Jr.	United States	37	34	36	38	35	45
41	Sabre	John B. Slack; Craig Rowley	United States	34	35	43	37	33	43
42	Elgon	Luiz Roboredo; Tito Roboredo	Portugal	41	42	15	43	41	43
43	Spankuk	Chresten Jensen; Karl Klaus	United States	42	39	44	19	42	39
44	Ganymede	F. B. Bassett; John Ross	United States	43	41	41	44	43	13

Legend: WDR – Withdrew;
