= Sweden (disambiguation) =

Sweden is a country in Northern Europe and a member of NATO and the EU.

Sweden may also refer to:

== Locations ==
- Sweden (European Parliament constituency), a constituency in the European Parliament

United States

- Sweden, Georgia, a ghost town
- Sweden, Maine, a town
- Sweden, Missouri, an unincorporated community
- Sweden, New York, a town
- Sweden, South Carolina, an unincorporated community
- Sweden Township, Pennsylvania
- Sweden Peak, a mountain in Alaska

== Music ==
- Sweden (album), an album by the Mountain Goats
- "Sweden", a song by C418 from Minecraft – Volume Alpha
- "Sweden (All Quiet on the Eastern Front)", a song by The Stranglers from Black and White

== People ==
- Sweden Aslam, a Bangladeshi gangster who spent years hiding in Sweden earning the moniker

== See also ==
- Category:National sports teams of Sweden
- New Sweden (disambiguation)
- Sverige (disambiguation)
- Swedish Empire
