= Kookaburra III =

Australian yacht in the 1987 America's Cup

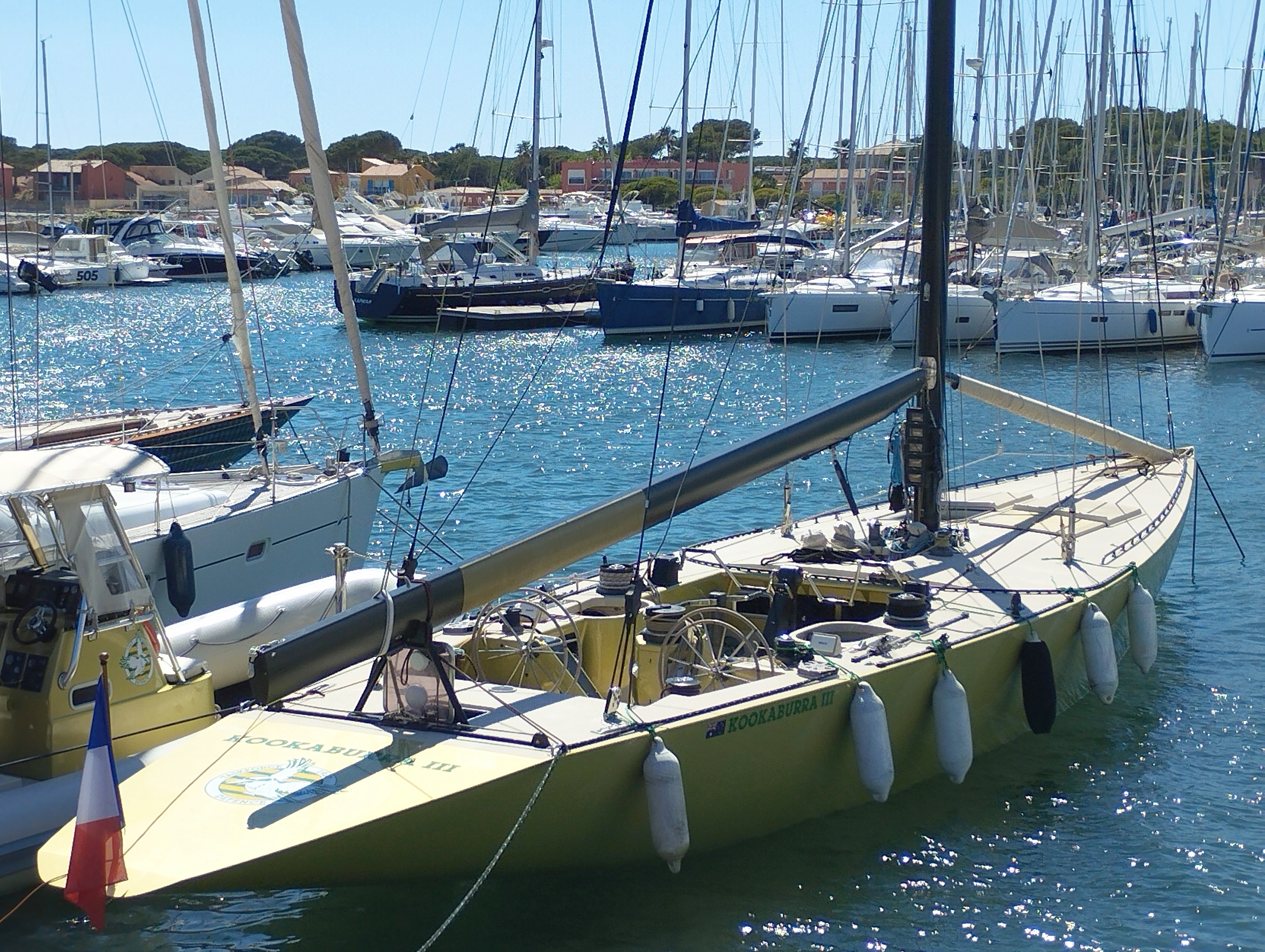
- Kookaburra III in France in June 2024
- Yacht club: Royal Perth Yacht Club
- Nation: Australia
- Class: 12 Metre
- Sail no: KA–15
- Designer(s): Iain Murray and John Swarbrick
- Builder: Parry Boat Builders
- Owner(s): Kevin Parry Taskforce 87

Racing career
- Skippers: Iain Murray
- America's Cup: 1987

Kookaburra III (KA 15) was the Australian 12 Metre yacht sailed by Iain Murray in the 1987 America's Cup held off of Fremantle, Western Australia. Murray won the Defender Selection and Kookaburra III represented Australia in the America's Cup, where she lost to American challenger Dennis Conner sailing Stars & Stripes 87.

== Design ==
Preparing for the defence of the America's Cup, Alan Bond expressed concerns that there was a lack of adequate competition in Australia to prepare for the event. Business rival Kevin Parry took him up on the challenge. Gathering together top sailors from across Australia, Parry's Taskforce 87 syndicate generated a top flight campaign, comprising an investment of $28 million.

Kookaburra III was built in Perth, Western Australia by Parry Boat Builders. She was the third of the Kookaburra boats built by the Taskforce 87 syndicate, all of which were designed by Iain Murray and John Swarbrick. The golden hulled Kookaburra's were fast and evenly matched, particularly Kookaburra II and Kookaburra III. Kookaburra II was intended to be a bench mark boat and was left unaltered from May 1986 on, while significant changes went into the hulls and keels of Kookaburra I and Kookaburra III. Throughout Kookaburra II remained a very fast sailer, Iain Murray believed her to be the syndicates fastest right up until the defender finals, when Kookaburra III finally became faster as a result of a keel modification.

== Career ==
=== Defender round robin series ===
The defender series was extremely competitive, with Kookaburra II, Kookaburra III and Australia IV all very close in boat speed. This led to extremely close racing, marred only by the large number of protests raised. The red protest flag was a frequent flyer from the stern of a defender boat, with the results of the day's sailing protested nearly every other race. In all, fifty protests were lodged during the 101 races of the defender selection series.

The end of the selection round robins series found Kookaburra III the leading yacht, with 83 points, followed by Australia IV at 77 and Kookaburra II at 70. Steak 'n' Kidney was eliminated on points halfway through the final round. With ongoing protests over the legality of Australia IV's balloon jib, an agreement was reached in which Australia IV and Kookaburra III would race in a best of nine set. The winning syndicate could then use Kookaburra II as the defender yacht if they so chose.

=== Defender finals ===
Keel modifications to Kookaburra III in the break following the final round robins finally gave her the edge in boat speed she had been looking for. For their part, the Bond syndicate was unable to come up with anything extra for Australia IV. The finals saw Kookaburra III sweep Australia IV five races to nil to win the defender selection process. In doing so, she placed Alan Bond's syndicate on the outside of an America's Cup regatta for the first time in thirteen years.

=== America's Cup ===
In the America's Cup, defender Kookaburra III lost to American challenger Dennis Conner and Stars & Stripes 87, four races to nil.
