= Bruno Troublé =

French sailor

Bruno Trouble (born 29 May 1945) is a French sailor who competed in the 1968 Summer Olympics and in the 1976 Summer Olympics.

He raced a Flying Dutchman at the 1968 Olympics, finishing sixth, and a Soling keelboat at the 1976 Olympics, finishing seventh.

He later got involved in America's Cup sailing, where he was a member of the French afterguard in the 1977 Herbert Pell Cup. He helmed the French boat in the 1980 Herbert Pell Cup and 1983 Louis Vuitton Cup. Credited with creating the Louis Vuitton Cup, Troublé later ran the Louis Vuitton Media Centre for the 2000 and 2003 America's Cups and organised the Louis Vuitton Pacific Series and Louis Vuitton Trophy.

In 2003, he was made an honorary officer of the New Zealand Order of Merit. He has also been awarded the Legion of Honour.
