= Freedom (yacht) =

American racing yacht

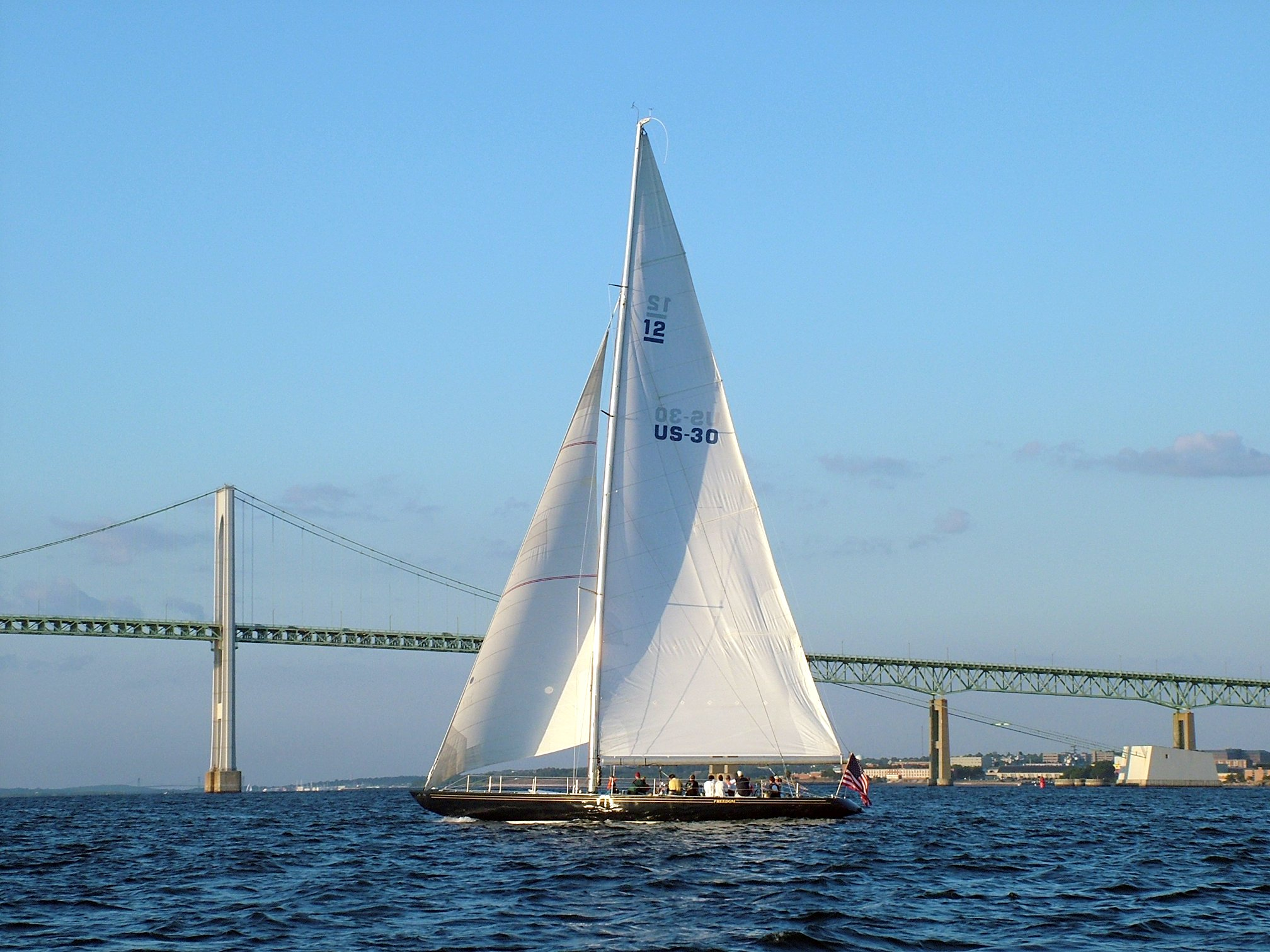
- 1980 America's Cup winner Freedom
- Yacht club: New York Yacht Club
- Nation: United States
- Class: 12-metre
- Sail no: US–30
- Designer(s): Olin Stephens and Bill Langan
- Builder: Minneford Yacht Yard

Racing career
- Skippers: Dennis Conner
- Notable victories: 1980 America's Cup
- America's Cup: 1980

Freedom (12 meter US-30) is a 12-metre class racing yacht and winner of the 1980 America's Cup, defeating the challenging yacht Australia under skipper Dennis Conner. Freedom was designed with an alloy rather than a wood hull by Olin Stephens and Bill Langan, and constructed at Minneford Yacht Yard. She was skippered in the Cup by Dennis Conner.

Today Freedom is available for charter out of Newport, Rhode Island from America's Cup Charters, along with fellow America's Cup winners Intrepid and Weatherly.
