= 1987 Defender Selection Series =

1987 competition for America's Cup

1987 Defender Selection Series Fremantle, Western Australia
Date	18 October 1986 – 20 January 1987
Number of Yachts	8
Coordinates	31°57′9.0″S 115°38′48.12″E
Winner	Kookaburra III

The 1987 Defender Selection Series was raced between four syndicates competing for the right to represent the Royal Perth Yacht Club as the defender of the America's Cup. Kookaburra III won the series and advanced to the 1987 America's Cup. However, they failed to defend the cup from the challenge of Stars & Stripes 87.

== The Syndicates ==
=== America's Cup Defence Ltd (Australia II, III and IV) ===
The highest profile syndicate was the professional and well funded Alan Bond group which had won the 1983 Cup and which had a wealth of experience, having been to Newport as challengers in 1974, 1977, 1980 and 1983. The team won the 1986 World 12-metre (39 ft) championships in convincing style with Australia III. Close Bond associate Warren Jones was the syndicate director and veteran 12-metre helmsman John Longley managed the day-to-day business. Four helmsmen were used in rotation: Colin Beashel, Hugh Treharne, Gordon Lucas and Carl Ryves, with Beashel taking the skipper role in the finals. Beashel and Treharne had extensive previous 12-metre experience. Grant Simmer was the navigator. The crew included Dean Phipps.

Some commentary has stated that John Bertrand had fallen out of favour with the Bond syndicate because of the publication of his book Born to Win. This cannot be the case as his book clearly states Bertrand's decision to transition from sailing to a business career in the book obviously before it was published. Bertrand was a media commentator for Alan Bond's network during the televised races.

Two sister boats to Australia II were built, Australia III (KA-9) which was launched on 27 September 1985 and much later Australia IV (KA-16). Australia III's launch was a stage managed event with a lavish ceremony at Royal Perth Yacht Club which included Bond's wife Eileen naming the boat. It was built at Cottesloe by boatbuilder Stephen Ward and designed by Ben Lexcen, the same team which had produced Australia II. The launch culminated in a sedate sail in the Swan River watched by thousands of spectators on the river foreshore.

=== South Australia Challenge (South Australia) ===
The South Australian government provided a A$1M, equivalent to A$3.2 million in 2022, subsidy to a syndicate of businessmen led by Adelaide advertising executive Roger Lloyd who contracted Lexcen to design a boat called South Australia (KA-8). The group included support from 150 companies. For $600,000 the group received a new boat which was also built at Ward's boatyard with a similar design to Australia II. As well as design and construction, the syndicate had also contracted with the Australia II team to provide basic crew training. As soon as South Australia was launched, trials between it and Australia II were held and the results considered before the design of Australia III was finalised.

National small boat champion Fred Neill initially skippered South Australia with 12-metre veteran Sir James Hardy. Hardy later stood down as skipper but stayed on with the syndicate. New South Welshman Philip Thompson was appointed helmsman and, following poor early showings, became the replacement skipper with John Savage in the afterguard. Irish offshore yachtsman Joe English (sailor) joined as main sheet trimmer. South Australia was too small for the strong wind conditions and was eliminated after series B.

=== Taskforce '87 (Kookaburra I, II and III) ===
The third syndicate was a well funded group known as Taskforce '87 and headed by Perth businessman Kevin Parry. Taskforce '87 built three boats, Kookaburra (KA-11), Kookaburra II (KA-12) skippered by Peter Gilmour and Kookaburra III (KA-15) skippered by Iain Murray. The afterguard of the Kookaburra boats were combined for the Cup finals, with Gilmour acting as skipper in the pre-race through the start, while Murray would take the helm for the race itself. Gilmour would then move over to mainsheet trimmer. The Kookaburra boats were designed by John Swarbrick and Iain Murray.

=== Eastern Australian Defence Syndicate (Australia I and Steak 'n Kidney) ===
The eastern states team headed by Syd Fischer purchased Australia I (KA 5) as a trial boat while a new boat designed by Peter Cole was built. Steak 'n' Kidney (KA-14, named after steak and kidney pie, popular in Australia and to the rhyming slang for the City of Sydney) was launched relatively late in the campaign at a ceremony at the Sydney Opera House in April 1986.

The design was selected by Cole after testing 22 hull shapes and 11 winged keel variations at the Netherlands Ship Model Basin during 1985. The Royal Sydney Yacht Squadron was the syndicate's sponsoring club, and Gary Sheard, an Olympian in Solings was the initial skipper, Fred Neil took over as skipper in the early rounds of the eliminations. Following the elimination of South Australia, after series B, Philip Thompson was appointed the new skipper. Steven Kemp was the tactician and Robin Doussen the navigator, Joe English was later recruited during the semi-finals after South Australia was knocked out in series 3. A new, very powerful keel now made Steak'n Kidney a very fast and she began winning races. The extra power was overloading existing rigging and sails, races were lost due to breakdowns, not speed. Needed points to qualify as defender were also lost. Her last Defender series race, against the eventual Defender Kookaburra III, she won by 1 minute 36 seconds. She went onto the 12-meter world championships in Sardina, Italy, later that year and won a head to head match race against Dennis Connor with Stars and Stripes, the winner of the 1987 Americas Cup.

== The Series ==
The defender series races were sailed on the America's Cup course with the top four boats of Series A, B and C going to the Series D semi-finals. The top two boats entered the finals and the winner entered the America's Cup series as the defender. The buoy is a permanent navigation marker used for shipping in and out of Fremantle harbour and is located 8 nautical miles (15 km) west-north-west of the harbour in Gage Roads Every boat raced each other twice in the first 3 series.

Series A:	18 to 30 October
Series B:	9 to 21 November
Series C:	2 to 20 December
Series D:	27 December to 28 January
Finals:	14 to 27 January

The six competing boats from four syndicates were Kookaburra II (KA-12), Kookaburra III (KA-15), Australia III (KA-9), Australia IV (KA-16), Steak 'n' Kidney (KA-14) and South Australia (KA-8).

The defender semi-finals were held from 27 December to 9 January between Kookaburra II, Kookaburra III, Australia IV and Steak'n'Kidney after which Kookaburra II and Steak'n'Kidney were eliminated. The final of the defender selection series was held from 14 to 20 January January. Kookaburra III was selected as the official defender.

Challenger	Races	Won	Loss	Points
Kookaburra III	11	8	3	53
Australia IV	11	9	2	47
Kookaburra II	11	5	6	34
Steak n' Kidney	11	4	6	12
