= Quebec City Monarks =

- Founded: 2003
- Folded: 2009
- League: Ligue de Football Majeur du Quebec
- Based in: Quebec City
- Arena: Stade du Séminaire Saint-François, Saint-Augustin-de-Desmaures
- Colours: green, white, red
- Championships: 2005, 2006, 2007

The Quebec City Monarks (French: Monarks de Québec) were the Quebec City Canadian football team in the Ligue de Football Majeur du Quebec (English: Quebec Major Football League).

They won the regular season league championship as well as the Silver Cup in 2005, 2006, and 2007 since joining the league in 2003.

The team seems to have ceased operations following the 2009 season.
