= International 806 =

- Class symbol

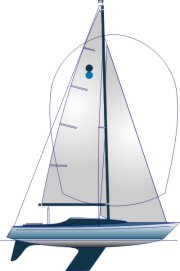

Development
- Designer: Pelle Pettersson
- Year: 1974
- Builders: Monark, OL Boats
- Name: International 806

Boat
- Draft: 1.4 m (4 ft 7 in)

Hull
- Type: Monohull
- Hull weight: 1,700 kg (3,700 lb)
- LOA: 8.06 m (26.4 ft)
- LWL: 7 m (23 ft)
- Beam: 2.33 m (7 ft 8 in)

Hull appendages
- Keel: Fixed

Rig
- Rig type: sloop

Sails
- Mainsail area: 15.5 m^{2} (167 sq ft)
- Jib/genoa area: 20 m^{2} (220 sq ft)
- Spinnaker area: 45 m^{2} (480 sq ft)

The International 806 (also Monark 806) is a sloop-rigged sailing yacht built by Ott Yachts and is popular in northern and central Europe. It is designed as cruiser/racer yacht.

== History ==
Monark 806 was launched in 1974 by Monark in Varberg and designed by Swedish yacht designer Pelle Pettersson. Production ended in Sweden in 1977 and was taken up by Danish OL Boats.
