= New Sweden (yacht) =

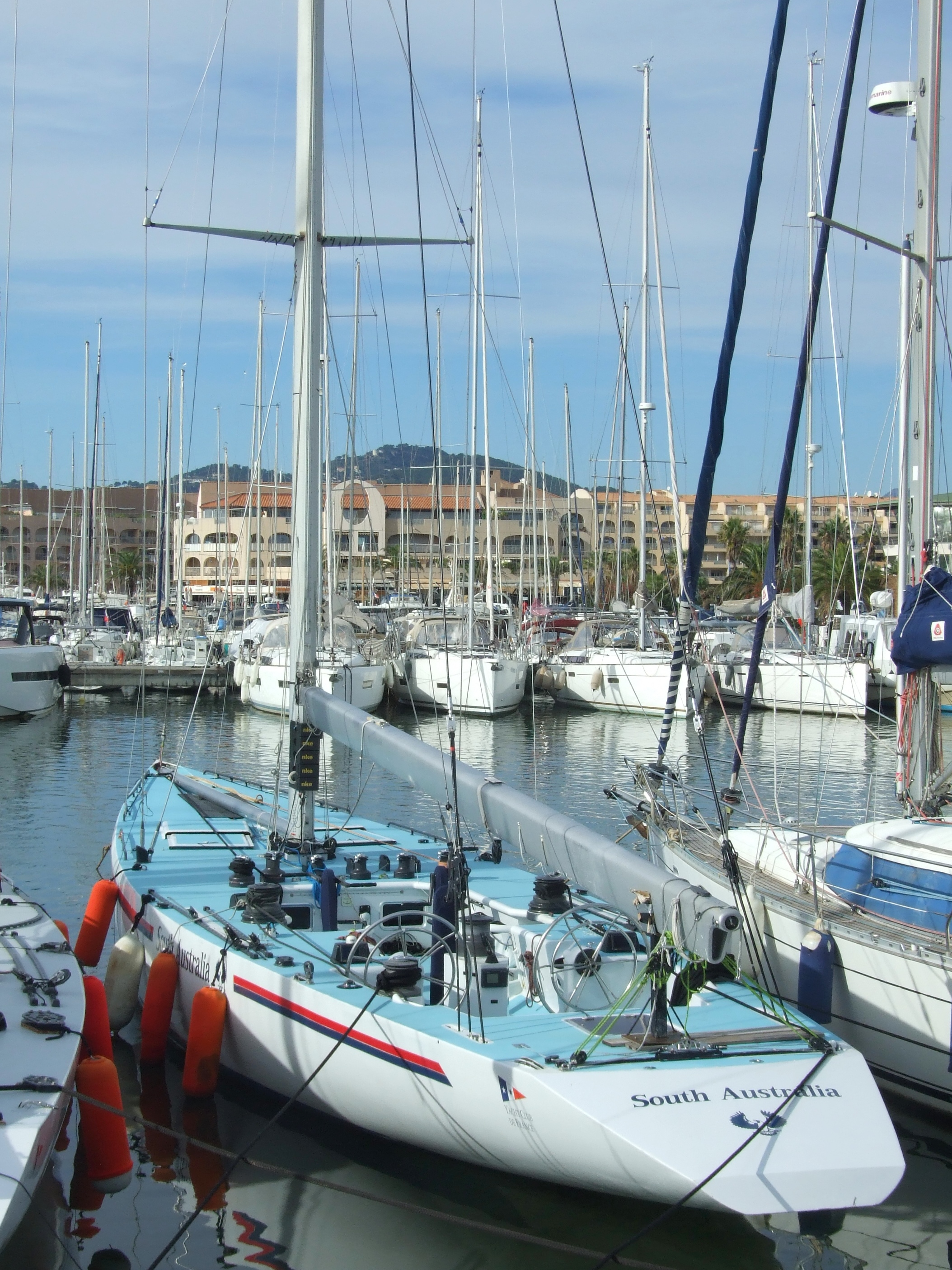
- South Australia KA-8, en 2024.
- Other names: South Australia
- Class: 12 Metre
- Sail no: KA–8, S–5
- Designer(s): Ben Lexcen
- Builder: Steve Ward
- Launched: 1987

Racing career
- Skippers: Phil Thompson (1987); Olle Johansson (1988)

Specifications
- Length: 19.5 m (64 ft) (LOA); 13.95 m (45.8 ft) (LWL)
- Beam: 3.72 m (12.2 ft)
- Draft: 2.72 m (8 ft 11 in)
- Sail area: 174 m^{2} (1,870 sq ft)

New Sweden, previously South Australia, is an Australian 12 Metre class yacht. It was by designed by Ben Lexcen and built by Steve Ward.

== Career ==
South Australia competed in the 1987 Defender Selection Series, helmed by Phil Thompson.

New Sweden competed in the 1988 12-metre World Championships against Bengal III, Crusader, Kookaburra III, Nordstjernan and Steak 'n' Kidney.

It appeared in the 1988 Swedish film S.O.S. – En segelsällskapsresa.
