= Australia (yacht) =

Yacht that raced in the Americas Cup

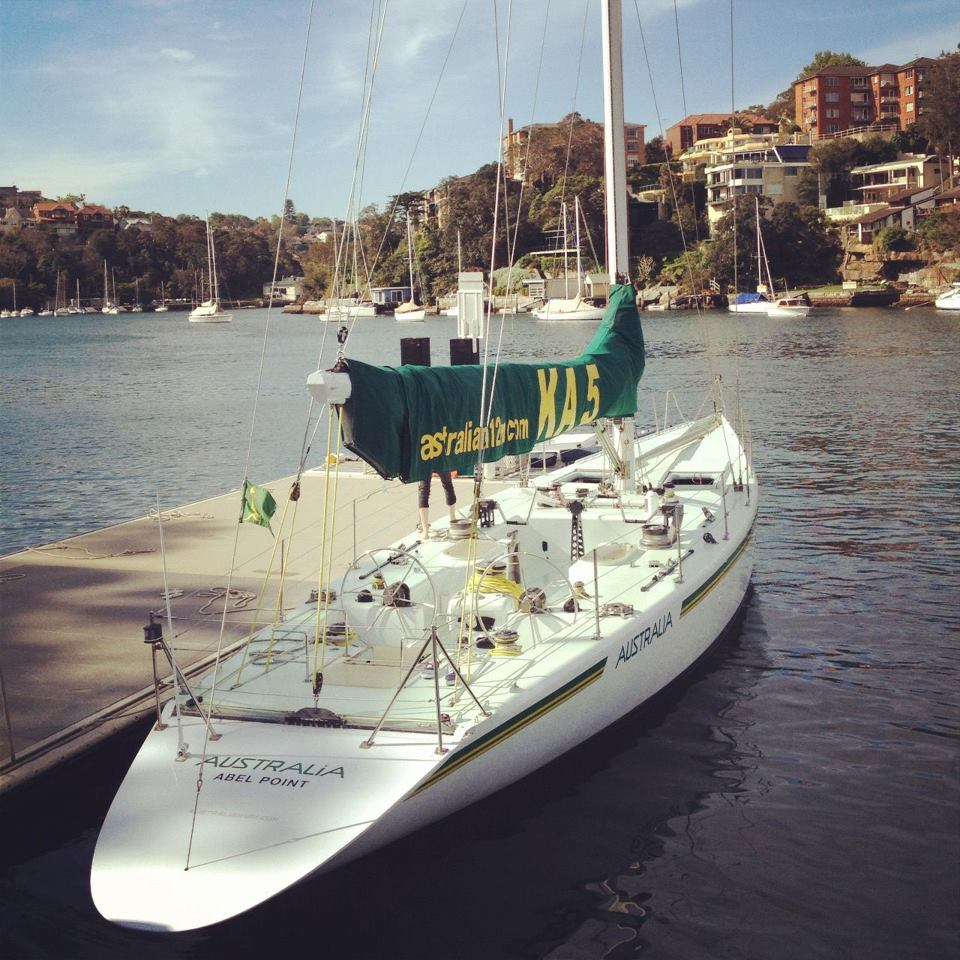
- Australia docked in Sydney in July 2014
- Yacht club: Sun City Yacht Club (1977); Royal Perth Yacht Club (1980)
- Nation: Australia
- Class: 12 Metre
- Sail no: KA–5
- Designer(s): Ben Lexcen
- Builder: Steve Ward
- Launched: 1977

Racing career
- Skippers: Noel Robins (1977); James Hardy (1980)
- America's Cup: 1977

Australia (KA–5) is an Australian 12 Metre racing yacht that twice challenged unsuccessfully for the America's Cup in 1977 and 1980. Designed by Ben Lexcen in association with Dutch designer Johan Valentijn for Alan Bond, Australia failed to win a single race against the 1977 defender, Courageous (US-26), but won one race against the 1980 defender, Freedom (US-30). Australia resides in Sydney, Australia.

== Design and construction ==
Australia was designed during 1976 by Ben Lexcen in association with the Dutch designer Johan Valentijn. Both men spent seven months experimenting with 1/9th scale models in the University of Delft test tank in the Netherlands.

Australia is a conventional design and has been described as a "Courageous-style boat". It has v-shaped mid-ship sections, a low freeboard, large bustle and a low aft run finishing in a wide U-shaped transom. Its fore overhang is very narrow and round shaped in its lowest part. The cockpits are shallow, keel is thin and the ballast is placed very low. The elliptical mast is made in extruded aluminium. Australia was approximately 1,500 kilograms (3,300 lb) lighter than Courageous and it was hoped that by lowering the freeboard and taking a penalty on length, Australia would prove faster than the US boat.

Australia was built by Steve Ward in Perth and launched in February 1977. Australia then sailed in sea trials against Alan Bond's 1974 challenger, Southern Cross (KA-4), off Yanchep in Western Australia. The older boat remained a trial horse for Australia during the 1977 America's Cup series.

== 1977 America's Cup challenge ==
For the 1977 America's Cup, Australia went to Newport and raced against the 1970 Australian challenger, Gretel II (KA-3), the Swedish entrant, Sverige (S-3), and the French challenger, France (F-1), led by Baron Bich. Eventually, Australia won the right to challenge for the Cup by defeating Sverige 4–0.

However Australia lost to the US defender, Courageous, 4–0. Ben Lexcen, who initially stayed in Australia during the challenge, went to Newport and was disappointed to find that Australia had a poor-quality mast from Southern Cross and that Australia's sails were flat, heavy and of poor quality. Australia was never competitive and Courageous won the series easily.

== 1980 America's Cup challenge ==
Initially, Alan Bond suggested dropping Australia and designing a new boat for the 1980 series. Ben Lexcen, however, was convinced that Australia's hull – with a few modifications – was a good design and that its performance would improve with a new rig and sails. The hull had its keel made sharper at the bottom, and the bustle was lowered slightly and made larger to help improve the steering.

Australia's competitors for challenging the Americans were: Sverige, back for a second time; France III (F-3), a new yacht for Baron Bich, and the British challenger Lionheart (K-18). Lionheart was a fast boat, partly because it was fitted with a "bendy" mast which hooked aft several feet at its tip giving it 10 per cent extra unmeasured sail area on its main sail. In light winds, that gave the British boat a strong advantage.

Seeing the British boat's speed, the Australia camp decided to copy the mast. The "bendy" rig added to Australia's speed and it became a very competitive boat defeating the US defender Freedom (US-30) in the second race of the series. However, the late adoption of the "bendy" mast meant that the crew of Australia were experimenting with the newly cut sails and lacked the necessary confidence in them to win. In any case, the "bendy" mast was only effective in light winds. In the final two races, the wind blew hard enough to cancel out whatever advantage it gave Australia and Freedom won the series convincingly 4–1.

== After 1980 ==
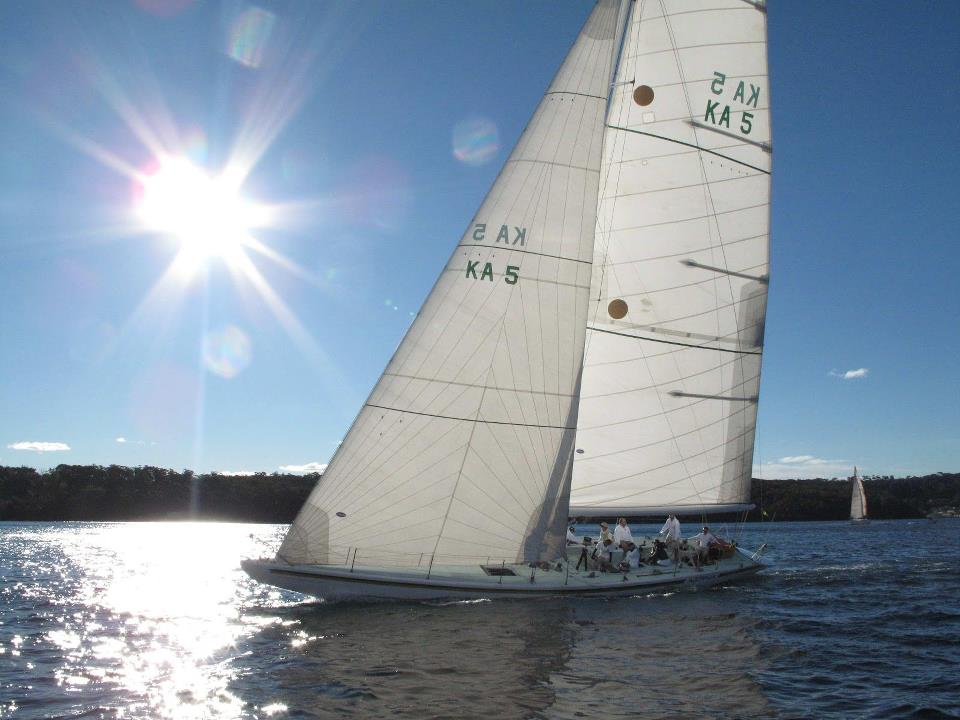
Australia under sail

Following the 1980 challenge, Australia was sold to the British Victory syndicate headed by Peter de Savary. Renamed Temeraire, the boat became a trial-horse for Victory 82 (K-21) and Victory 83 (K-22) for the 1983 America's Cup that was ultimately won by Australia II (KA-6).

In 1985, Australia returned to Australia after being bought by Syd Fischer in 1985 to be the trail horse for Fisher's "East Australia America's Cup Defence" syndicate defender, Steak 'n' Kidney (KA-14). Australia, as with Steak 'n' Kidney, was eventually refitted, passing survey, as a day sailing charter boat in 2004 and was acquired, along with Steak 'n' Kidney, by the Australia 12m Historic Trust in 2011.

After a major refurbishment, it was put up for sale in 2019. As at April 2025, it was moored in Lavender Bay opposite McMahons Point ferry wharf.
