= Pelle Petterson =

Swedish sailor

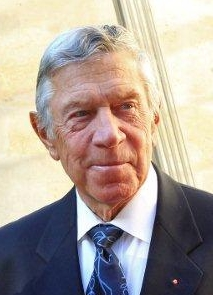
- Pelle Petterson in June 2010

Personal information
- Full name: Pelle Helmer Petterson
- Born: 31 July 1932 (age 93) Stockholm, Sweden

Sailing career
- Sport: Sailing
- Club: Kattegattflottiljen
- Class(es): Star, Soling, 6 Metre, 12 Metre
Medal record
Sailing
Representing Sweden
Olympic Games
Silver medal – second place	1972 Munich	Star class
Bronze medal – third place	1964 Tokyo	Star class
World Championships
Gold medal – first place	1969 San Diego	Star class
Gold medal – first place	1977 Marstrand	6 Metre class
Gold medal – first place	1979 Seattle	6 Metre class
Gold medal – first place	1983 Newport	6 Metre class
Silver medal – second place	1969 Copenhagen	Soling
Silver medal – second place	1974 Laredo	Star class

Pelle Helmer Petterson (born 31 July 1932) is a Swedish sailor and yacht designer. Petterson has won two Olympic medals, four world championship titles, challenged for the America's Cup and designed several sailboats, including Maxi 77.

== Biography ==
=== Early life ===
Pelle Petterson was born in Stockholm, Sweden on 31 July 1932 to Helmer Petterson and Norwegian-born Borgny Petterson (born Holm). His father was also a designer who developed wood gas aggregates and Volvo PV444, strongly influencing his son to go in his footsteps. In his youth, Petterson built gravity racers and sailed in the Stjärnbåt class.

=== Design career ===
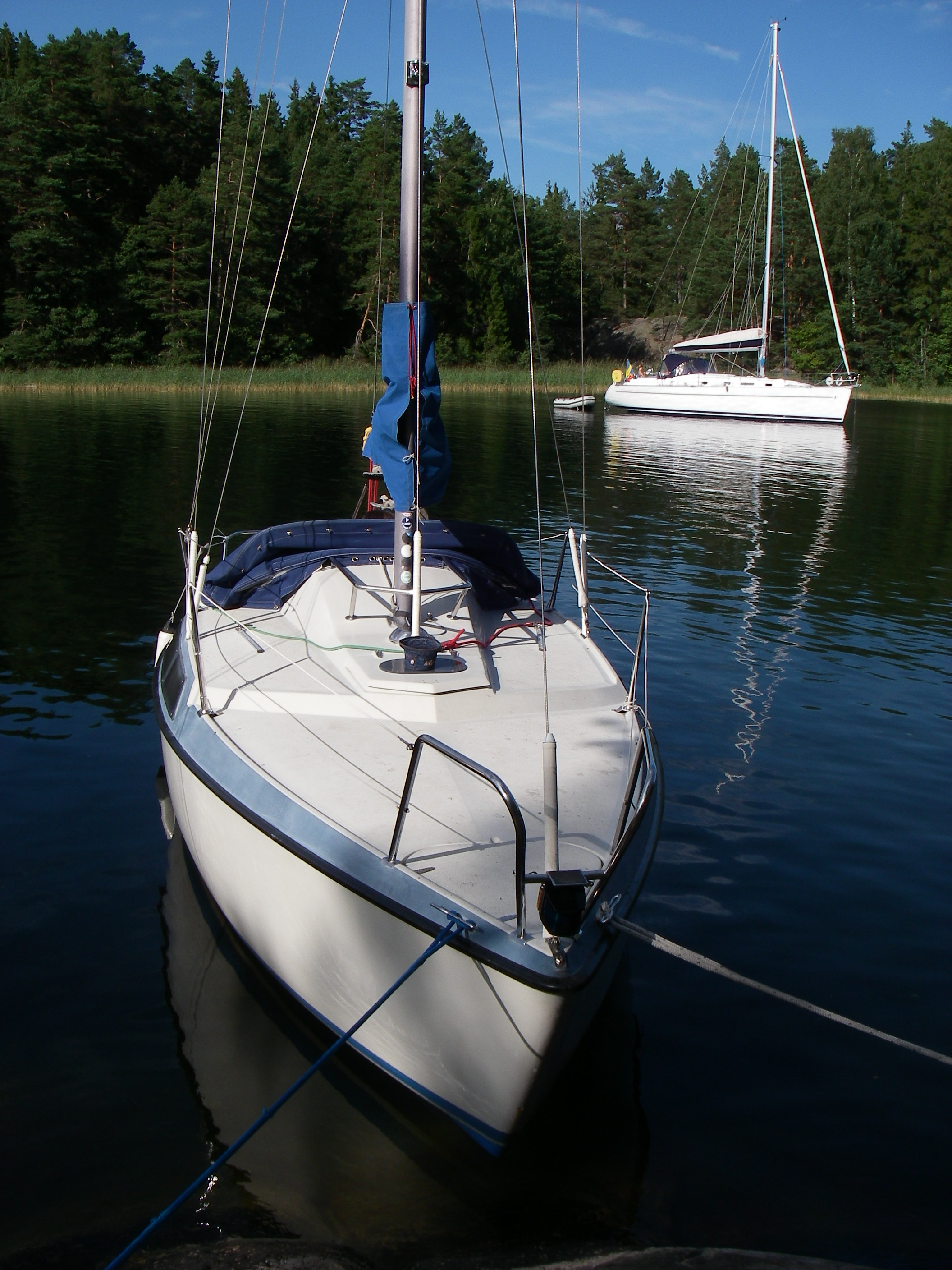
A Maxi 77, designed by Petterson

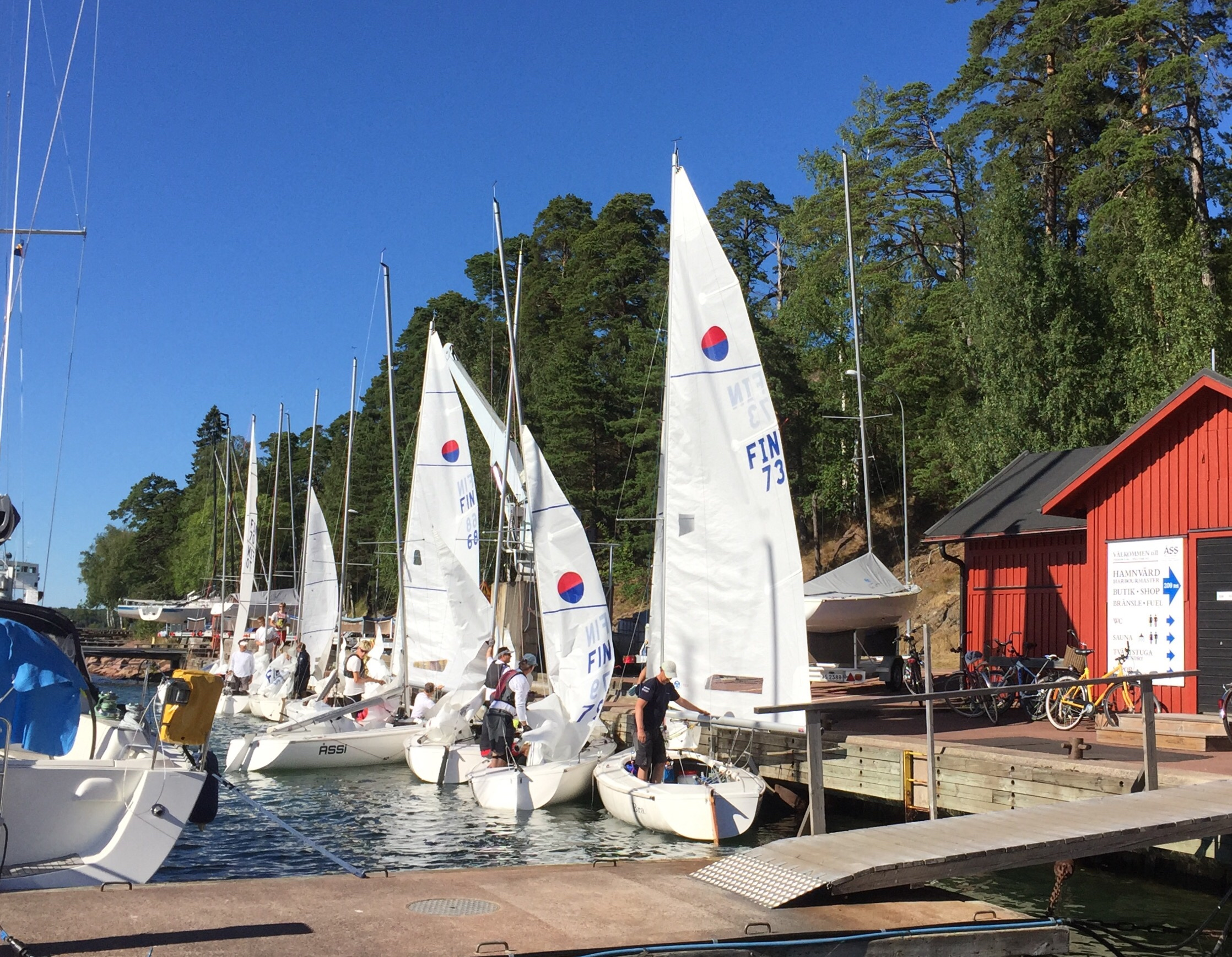
Monark 606s, designed by Petterson

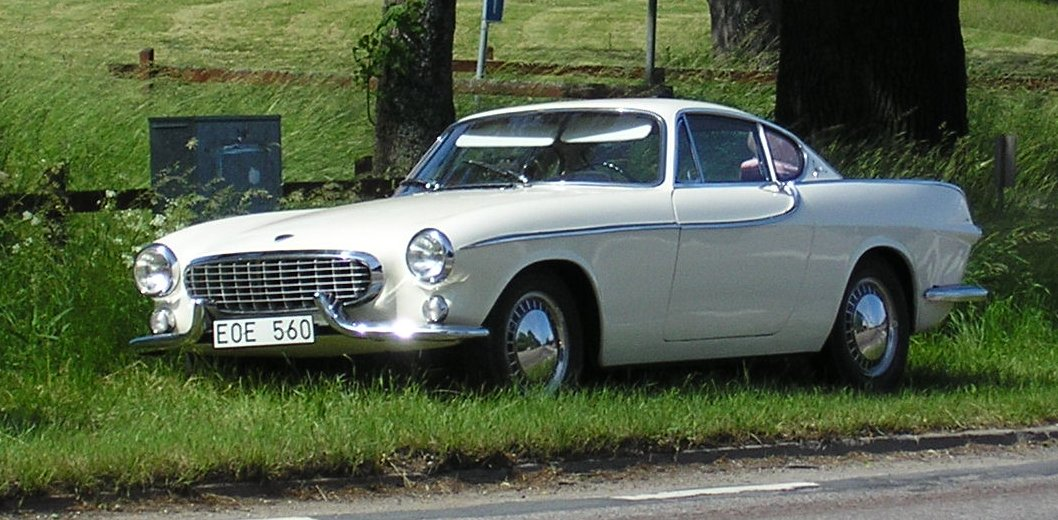
A Volvo P1800, designed by Petterson

Petterson studied at the Pratt Institute in New York from 1955 to 1957. He designed the 12 mR yacht Sverige, 17 6 mR yachts, and worked with Maxi, Nimbus and Monark Crescent. The Maxi series comprise about 30 designs, among them the Maxi 77. He has also designed the sailboats Monark 606 and C 55. In 2003, he designed the Swedish Match 40 for match racing events.

He also designed Volvo's successful sports car, the P1800, while he was a student of Pietro Frua.

=== Sailing career ===
Competing in the Star class, Petterson won a bronze in 1964 together with Holger Sundström. He held the world title in this event in 1969, when he won the 1969 Star World Championship in San Diego together with Ulf Schröder.

In 1972, Petterson was back at the Olympics, again competing in the Star class, this time winning a silver medal. Petterson, along with Stellan Westerdahl, led the regatta after five races, but struggles in the sixth race made David Forbes of Australia winning the gold.

With money from the Maxi 77 design, and sponsored by SCA, Skandinaviska Enskilda Banken and Volvo, Petterson challenged for the America's Cup two times. With the yacht Sverige, Pettersons team competed in the 1977 Herbert Pell Cup and 1980 Herbert Pell Cup, advancing to the final in the 1977 edition.

In Sweden, Pettersson represented Kattegatflottiljen in Gothenburg.

== Personal life ==
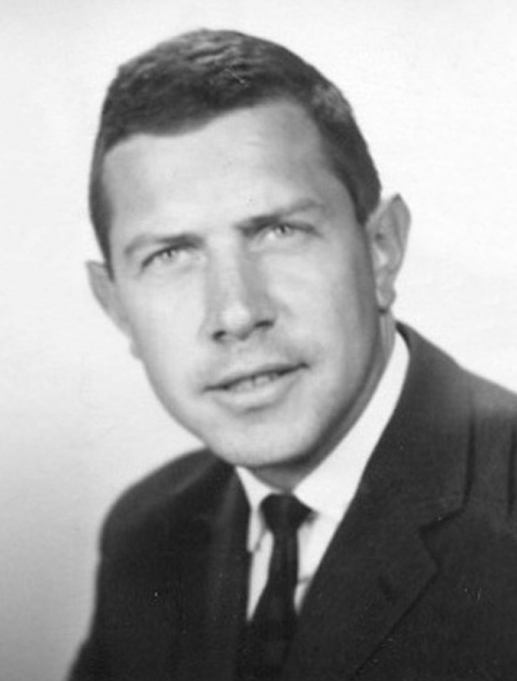
Petterson in the 1960s

Pelle Petterson married Irene and has three children. One of them, Cecilia, designs a sailing clothing and sports wear bearing the name Petterson, under the brand name Pelle P.. His other daughter, Ulrika "Icka", lives in the U.S. and is married to Paul Cayard, an American yachtsman and professional sailor.

Since 1975, Pelle Petterson and Irene are residing in Kullavik.

== Awards ==
Petterson was the first person to be inducted into the Swedish Sailing Hall of Fame. On 14 May 2004 he received the Swedish Business Award for Outstanding Achievements of the first grade from the West Swedish Chamber of Commerce and Industry. Among previous recipients are Arvid Carlsson Nobel laureate, Ingvar Kamprad founder of Ikea and Pehr G. Gyllenhammar former CEO of Volvo.

On 19 November 2004 he received the KTH's Stora Pris from the Royal Institute of Technology in Stockholm.

On 8 June 2010 Petterson received from Carl XVI Gustaf of Sweden the King's Medal (12th size bright-blue ribbon) for outstanding contributions as a yachtsman and boat designer.

== Achievements ==
As of 27 September 2015

Year	Competition	Venue	Position	Event
1964	Olympic Games	Enoshima, Japan	3rd	Star class
1966	Star World Championship	Kiel, West Germany	7th	Star class
1967	Star World Championship	Copenhagen, Denmark	5th	Star class
1969	Star World Championship	San Diego, USA	1st	Star class
1969	Soling World Championship	Copenhagen, DEN	2nd	Soling
1970	Star World Championship	Marstrand, Sweden	13th	Star class
1971	Star World Championship	Puget Sound, USA	7th	Star class
1972	Star World Championship	Caracas, Venezuela	4th	Star class
1972	Olympic Games	Kiel, West Germany	2nd	Star class
1973	Star World Championship	San Diego Bay, USA	8th	Star class
1974	Star World Championship	Laredo, Spain	2nd	Star class
1976	Star World Championship	Nassau, Bahamas	8th	Star class
1977	6 Metre World Cup	Marstrand, Sweden	1st	6 Metre class
1978	Star World Championship	San Francisco, USA	17th	Star class
1979	Star World Championship	Marstrand, Sweden	6th	Star class
1979	6 Metre World Cup	Seattle, USA	1st	6 Metre class
1983	6 Metre World Cup	Newport, USA	1st	6 Metre class
1995	Star World Championship	Laredo, Spain	63rd	Star class
1998	Star World Championship	Portorož, Slovenia	89th	Star class
2009	Star World Championship	Varberg, Sweden	61st	Star class

== See also ==
- Monark 540
