= Harold Cudmore =

Irish sailor (born 1944)

Personal information
- Full name: Harold Cudmore
- Born: 21 April 1944 (age 82) Cork, Ireland
Medal record
Sailing
Representing Ireland
Olympic Games 1972 Munich, Flying Dutchman Class

Harold Cudmore, CF (born April 21, 1944) is an Irish sailor.

Born and raised in Cork, Harold Cudmore became an internationally famous yacht racing skipper and match racer.

Cudmore had success in classes from the International 505, where he placed 2nd in the World and 4th in Europe, through classes like the Half-ton and One-Ton classes where he won the Worlds, through to the America's Cup and the Admiral's Cup.

He represented Ireland at the 1972 Summer Olympics, where he competed in the two-man Flying Dutchman sailing event.

He was the first non-American to win the Congressional Cup in the US, one of the longest-established and most prestigious match racing events.

In addition to sailing for Irish teams, many with fellow Cork sailor Joe English (sailor), Cudmore also captained the British and German Admiral's Cup teams at various times and skippered the top ranked boat in 1985.

In the America's Cup Cudmore was heavily involved in several British campaigns during the 1980s, and was the head coach of the 1992 winning campaign America and coaching the all-women's Defense campaign in 1995.

He was made a Churchill Fellow in 1983 and named Sailor of the Year in Britain in 1986.

Harold has two daughters.
