= House of Bond =

Television series

- Genre: Drama
- Written by: Sarah Smith
- Directed by: Mark Joffe
- Starring: Ben Mingay; Rachael Taylor; Adrienne Pickering; Sam Neill; Gyton Grantley; Samantha Jade; Anne Looby; John Howard; Johnny Ruffo; Roy Billing; Paul Gleeson; Jack Campbell; Vanessa Moltzen; John McNeill
- Country of origin: Australia
- Original language: English
- No. of episodes: 2

Production
- Executive producers: Andy Ryan; Jo Rooney; Michael Cordell
- Producer: Paul Bennett
- Running time: 2 x 75 mins
- Production company: CJZ

Original release
- Network: Nine Network
- Release: 24 April – 25 April 2017

House of Bond is an Australian two-part drama mini-series about the life of business tycoon Alan Bond which was produced in 2016 and aired on the Nine Network on 24 and 25 April 2017.

== Synopsis ==
House of Bond is a dramatised account of the life of Alan Bond, from the 1960s to the 2000s. Part One details Bond's prominence as a property investor and entrepreneur finishing with his greatest triumph as head of the syndicate that won the 1983 America's Cup. Part Two sees him expand on a global scale before his hubris saw his empire spectacularly falling down, becoming embroiled in a number of WA Inc scandals including the bailout of the Rothwells Bank and the stripping of Bell Resources.

== Cast ==
- Ben Mingay as Alan Bond
- Rachael Taylor as Diana Bliss
- Adrienne Pickering as Eileen Bond
- Sam Neill as Roland 'Tiny' Rowland
- Anne Louise Lambert as Josie Rowland
- Gyton Grantley as Peter Beckwith
- Samantha Jade as Tracey Tyler
- Anne Looby
- John Howard
- Johnny Ruffo as Peter King
- Roy Billing as Doozer Hughes
- Paul Gleeson
- Jack Campbell as John Bertrand
- John McNeill as Sir Frank Packer
- Lorna Lesley as Mrs Hughes
- Marcus Graham as Michael Williams
- Michael Beckley as Kevin Bradley
- Arky Michael as Paint Boss
- Airlee Dodds as Susanne Bond
- Bill Young as Frank Bond
- Bob Baines as RPYC Commodore
- Noel Hodda as Judge
- Vanessa Moltzen

== Reception ==
The series was criticised as "appalling" by Alan Bond's widow Eileen Bond. His family released a statement, claiming it was "inaccurate and sensationalised". Diana Bliss's brother Graeme, meanwhile appreciated Rachael Taylor's sympathetic portrayal of his sister believing she would be pleased with the series.

The series was generally well received. The Age and TV Week named the series 'Pick of the Week'. TV Week gave it 5/5 saying 'Adrienne Pickering is wonderful as the lively Eileen'. The Age called it 'luxurious and ambitious'. News.com.au called 'a 'riveting' yarn.' Debi Enker in The Sydney Morning Herald said it 'has the quality of a Shakespearean tragedy...' and 'captures the flash-and-dazzle of the era and offers some insight into a singular and spectacular rise and fall.' The Daily Telegraph called House of Bond a "flop", and the series received a 2.5 star rating from TV Tonight

=== Viewership ===
The mini-series averaged 657,000 across the five mainland capital cities on its final night winning its timeslot and increasing its ratings on the previous night.

No.	Title	Air date	Timeslot	Overnight ratings		Consolidated ratings		Total viewers	Ref(s)
No.	Title	Air date	Timeslot	Viewers	Rank	Viewers	Rank	Total viewers	Ref(s)
1	Part 1	24 April 2017	Monday 9:00pm	613,000	11	135,000	8	748,000	
2	Part 2	25 April 2017	Tuesday 9:00pm	657,000	11	120,000	10	777,000	

== DVD release ==
The series was released on DVD by Universal Home Video on May 11, 2017.

== See also ==
- Power Games: The Packer-Murdoch War
