= Australia IV =

Australian sailing yacht

- Yacht club: Royal Perth Yacht Club
- Nation: Australia
- Class: 12 Metre
- Sail no: KA–16

Racing career
- AC Challenger Selection Series: 1987

Australia IV is a 12 Metre class yacht that competed in the 1987 Defender Selection Series. After elimination, she and her sister ship Australia III were sold to businessman Masakuzu Kobayashi. She was renamed Bengal III, painted red and shipped to Japan, where both took part in preparation for a proposed Japanese America's Cup Challenge. As of 2019, she sits on the hard stand of the Miri Marina in Borneo, Malaysia.
