= Monark 540 =

Sailboat of 5.4 meters in length

Development
- Designer: Pelle Petterson
- Year: 1972
- Builder: Monark

Boat
- Draft: 0.85 m (2.8 ft)

Hull
- LOA: 5.40 m (17.7 ft)
- LWL: 5.00 m (16.40 ft)
- Beam: 2.00 m (6.56 ft)

The Monark 540 is a 5.40-metre (17.7 ft) sailboat. It has four beds and a small kitchen under one of the beds.

== History ==
The Monark 540 was designed by Pelle Petterson for Monark in 1972.
