= Sverige (yacht) =

- Yacht club: Royal Gothenburg Yacht Club
- Nation: Sweden
- Class: 12-metre
- Sail no: S–3
- Designer(s): Pelle Pettersson
- Builder: Enoch & Elfstedt
- Launched: 1977

Racing career
- Skippers: Pelle Pettersson
- AC Challenger Selection Series: 1977 Herbert Pell Cup; 1980 Herbert Pell Cup

Specifications
- Length: 19.5 metres (64 ft) (LOA); 13.95 metres (45.8 ft) (LWL)
- Beam: 3.72 metres (12.2 ft)
- Draft: 2.72 metres (8 ft 11 in)
- Sail area: 174 square metres (1,870 sq ft)

Sverige is a Swedish 12 Metre class yacht. It was by designed by Pelle Petterson and built by Enoch & Elfstedt.

Sverige competed in the 1977 Herbert Pell Cup and the 1980 Herbert Pell Cup, helmed by Pelle Petterson. Both times it was beaten by Australia.
