= Steak 'n' Kidney =

- Yacht club: Royal Sydney Yacht Squadron
- Nation: Australia
- Class: 12-metre
- Sail no: KA–14

Racing career
- AC Challenger Selection Series: 1987

Steak and Kidney is a 12-metre class yacht that competed in the 1987 Defender Selection Series for the America's Cup. In 2004, Steak and Kidney and another 12-metre class yacht, Australia, were refitted to pass survey as day sailing charter boats.

Steak and Kidney and Australia were acquired by the Australia 12m Historic Trust in 2011, and returned to a racing fitout. Today, the two yachts are based near Drummoyne, in Sydney, NSW, Australia, and make up the fleet used by the Australian 12 Metre Association in Sydney.
