= Herbert Pell Cup =

Yachting trophy

Herbert Claiborne Pell Cup
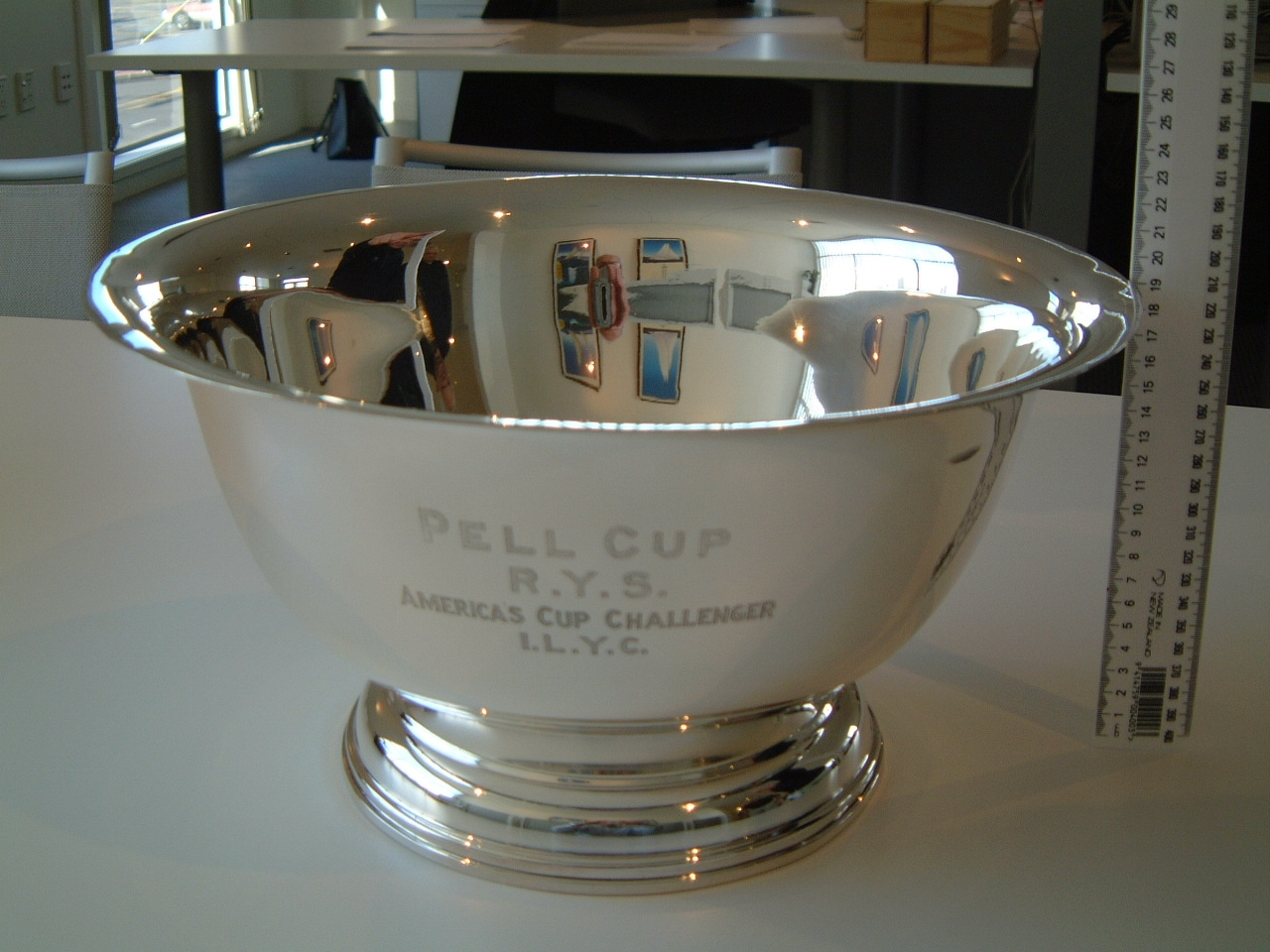
- First held: 1958
- Organizer: Ida Lewis Yacht Club
- Type: match race
- Champions: Royal New Zealand Yacht Squadron

The Herbert Pell Cup, established in 1958, was first presented by Herbert Claiborne Pell with the Ida Lewis Yacht Club, of Newport, Rhode Island, to the Challenger of the America's Cup Race. Following the establishment of a Challenger Selection Series for the America's Cup, the Herbert Pell Cup was given to the winner of the Challenger series. Beginning in 1983, the Herbert Pell Cup was given alongside the cup of the challenger series sponsor. The Cup is named for Herbert Claiborne Pell, Jr, (February 16, 1884 – July 17, 1961) who was a United States representative from New York, U.S. Minister to Portugal, U.S. Minister to Hungary, and a creator and member of the United Nations War Crimes Commission. Herbert Claiborne Pell was a summer resident of Newport Rhode Island, a member of the prominent and wealthy Lorillard and Claiborne families, and a life long sailing enthuisiast. He was the father of former Senator Claiborne Pell (1918-2009).

The Herbert Pell Cup, dating from 1958, is the senior most trophy presented to the America's Cup Challenger, and has all the challengers from 1958 through the present day engraved on it. It is currently held at the Royal Yacht Squadron at Cowes Castle on the Isle of Wight (until the next America's Cup Races). Since 1983 and the advent of sports marketing, the Cup has been given alongside the Louis Vuitton Cup, and the Prada Cup.

== See also ==
- Louis Vuitton Cup
- Prada Cup
