= Alan Bond =

Australian businessman (1938–2015)

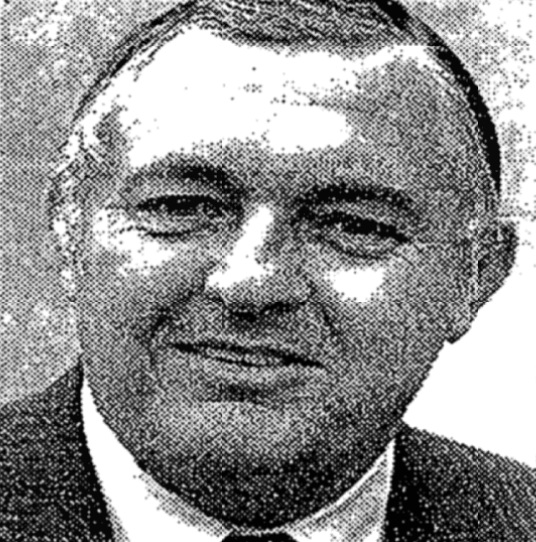
- Bond in 1987
- Born: 22 April 1938; Hammersmith, London, United Kingdom
- Died: 5 June 2015 (aged 77); Murdoch, Western Australia, Australia
- Occupation: Businessman
- Years active: 1954–1992
- Known for: Business magnate; yachting sponsor; corporate criminal; Founding Bond Corporation Holdings Ltd; Bond University founder
- Title: CEO of Bond Corporation Holdings Ltd
- Criminal charge: Corporate fraud
- Criminal penalty: Four years' imprisonment
- Spouses: Eileen Hughes (m. 1955; div. 1992); Diana Bliss (m. 1995; died 2012)
- Children: 4

Alan Bond (22 April 1938 – 5 June 2015) was an English-born Australian businessman noted for his high-profile and often corrupt business dealings. These included his central role in the WA Inc scandals of the 1980s, the biggest corporate collapse in Australian history, and his criminal conviction that saw him serve four years in prison. He is also remembered for bankrolling the successful challenge for the 1983 America's Cup; the first time the New York Yacht Club had lost in its 132-year history. He also founded Bond University on the Gold Coast in Queensland.

== Early life ==
Alan Bond was born on 22 April 1938, the son of Frank and Kathleen Bond in the Hammersmith area of London in the UK. In 1950, aged 12, he emigrated to Australia with his parents and his elder sister Geraldine, living in Fremantle, near Perth. At the age of 14, he was charged with stealing and being unlawfully on premises. Aged 18, he was arrested for being unlawfully on the premises, and reportedly admitted planning a robbery.

== Career ==
Bond began his career as a signwriter under the name 'Nu-Signs' after terminating his apprenticeship 18 months before it was due to end. In 1956 he was charged with attempted burglary, having been found by police roaming the streets of Fremantle dressed in State Electricity Commission overalls and carrying tools. Nu-Signs changed its name to Lesmurdie Heights – after the name of Bond's biggest estate – and changed the name again to Bond Corporation in 1959. In the 1960s, as a property developer in an expanding market, he was one of WA's largest borrowers from finance companies eager to lend to developers and uncritical of the valuations Bond put on his estates. Some of his developments included apartments along the Swan River and Lesmurdie Heights.

Bond Corporation Holdings Ltd
- Formerly: Progress Development Organisation (1959–1968), West Australia Land Holdings, Limited (1969–1974)
- Type: Public
- Traded as: Australian Securities Exchange; ASX: BCH; New Zealand Exchange; NZX: BON
- Industry: Real estate, brewing, media, and natural resources
- Founded: 1959; 67 years ago as Progress Development Organization
- Founder: Alan Bond
- Defunct: 1991
- Fate: Bankruptcy
- Successor: Southern Equities Corporation Limited
- Headquarters: Perth, Australia
- Areas served: Australia, United States, Chile, Hong Kong, and Europe

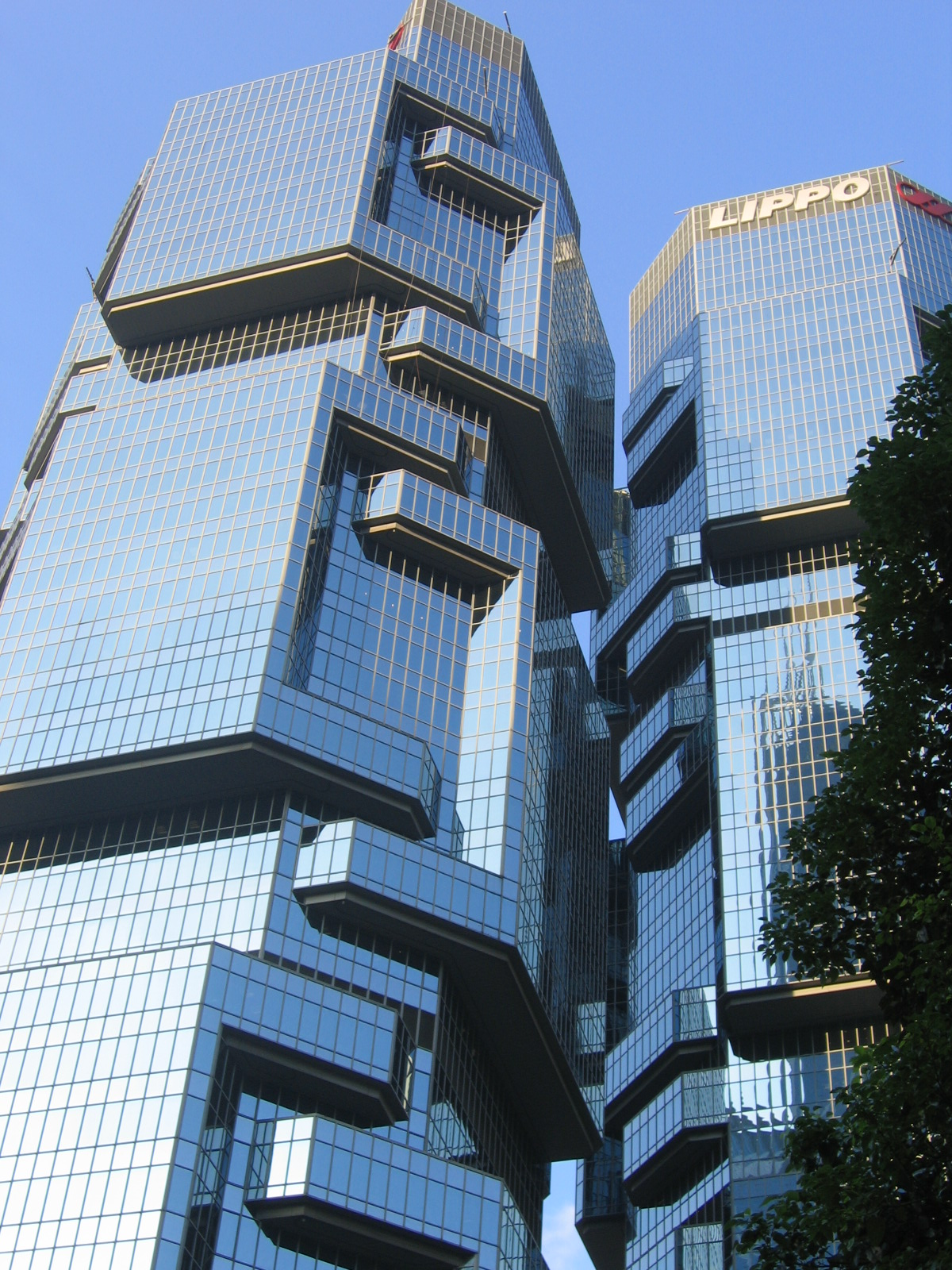
Lippo Centre in Admiralty, Hong Kong Island, 1988; bought from Alan Bond

In his heyday the Perth-based Bond was one of Australia's most prominent businesspeople. He extended his business interests into fields outside property development including brewing (he controlled Castlemaine Tooheys in Australia, leading the business to legal success in the landmark constitutional law case of Castlemaine Tooheys Ltd v South Australia, and G. Heileman Brewing Company in La Crosse, Wisconsin, US), gold mining, television, and airships. Australia's first private university, Bond University, was founded by the Bond Corporation in 1987. He purchased QTQ-9 Brisbane and settled an outstanding defamation dispute the station had with the Queensland premier, Joh Bjelke-Petersen by paying out A$400,000. He said in a television interview several years later that he paid because "Sir Joh left no doubt that if we were going to continue to do business successfully in Queensland then he expected the matter to be resolved".

In 1987, Bond purchased Vincent van Gogh's renowned painting Irises for $54 million—the highest price ever paid for a single painting at the time. However, the purchase was funded by a substantial loan from the auctioneer Sotheby's, which Bond failed to repay. The transaction was criticised by art dealers as possibly a manipulated sale designed to artificially inflate values generally (which it seems to have done). The painting was subsequently re-sold in 1990 to the J. Paul Getty Museum in Los Angeles.

That same year, Bond also organised the establishment of the Bond Centre in Hong Kong, which was located in a twin tower skyscraper complex. The property was later bought by the Lippo Group of Indonesia, and is now known as the Lippo Centre.

=== The America's Cup ===
Bond became a public hero in his adopted country when he bankrolled challenges for the America's Cup, which resulted in his selection in 1978 as Australian of the Year (awarded jointly with Galarrwuy Yunupingu). His Australia II syndicate won the 1983 America's Cup, which had been held by the New York Yacht Club since 1851, thus breaking the longest winning streak in the history of sport. That victory, widely regarded as one of Australia's greatest international sporting achievements, resulted in Bond's receipt of the Order of Australia, in the grade of Officer.

=== Purchasing the Nine Network ===
In 1987, Bond paid $1 billion to purchase the Australia-wide Channel Nine television network from Kerry Packer's PBL. In a 2003 interview with Andrew Denton, Bond described the negotiations as follows:

...when we first sat down, we said, 'We're either going to sell our stations to you for $400 million, or you're going to sell your stations to us.' And [Kerry Packer] said, 'Well, I don't really want to sell my stations.' And I said, 'Oh, is that right?' So, anyway, after much discussion, Kerry thumped the table and said, 'Listen, if you can pay me $1 billion, I'll sell them to you, otherwise bugger off'. ... [T]hen I rang the National Australia Bank. I said, 'Look, I'm in discussions here to buy these television stations. Kerry will sell to me, and what I want to do is put our stations together and then, with Sky Channel, I'm going to float it off as a separate entity and raise the capital to pay for it... [Packer] said $1 billion [was his asking price], but I think I'll get it for $800 million.' ... [The bank manager] duly rang back and said yes. I said, 'Thank God. I'll go and have some further negotiations with Kerry,' which I did. And true to his word, he never budged one penny off it. So I settled the deal with $800 million and a $200 million note. So he put his own $200 million in. So I had $1 billion. And we put our other two stations up as collateral, which were worth probably $400 million.

In fact, the agreed price was $1.05 billion. Packer took $800 million in cash and $250 million in subordinated debt in Bond Media. When Bond went bankrupt, Packer was able to turn the debt into a 37% equity in Bond Media, which now included Channel 9 in Brisbane, and was worth about $500 million. It was valued at $1 billion, but had $500 million in debt on the books. Packer was quoted as saying, "You only get one Alan Bond in your lifetime, and I've had mine".

== Bankruptcy and conviction for fraud ==
In 1992, Bond was declared bankrupt after failing to repay a $194 million personal guarantee on a loan for a nickel-mining project. His debts reportedly totalled $1.8 billion at the time. He feigned brain damage to avoid answering questions during bankruptcy trials, a charade he saw no need to keep up afterwards. He was forced to sell Glympton Park in the UK, which he purchased in 1988.

In 1995, his family bought him out of bankruptcy, with creditors accepting a payment of A$12 million, a little over half a cent per dollar.

In 1997, Bond was sentenced to seven years in prison after pleading guilty to using his controlling interest in Bell Resources to deceptively siphon off A$1.2 billion into the coffers of the Bond Corporation. The funds were used to shore up the cash resources of the ailing Bond Corporation, which spectacularly collapsed, leaving Bell Resources in a precarious and uncertain position. He was stripped of his 1984 honour as an Officer of the Order of Australia.

Writing of Bond's decline in his 1999 memoir, fellow businessman and property developer Alistair McAlpine (1942–2014) wrote:

Events, however, moved against him–his gambles had been a little too wild and his business practice a little too sharp. His decline was short, his struggle to avoid the consequences of his actions protracted but its result inevitable. While Western Australia was the richer for having Bond as a citizen, it's just a shame that he directed himself towards business rather than politics.

Bond was released from Karnet Prison Farm in 2000, having served four years in various Western Australian prisons.

== Return to investment activities ==
Following release, he became active in various mining investments, predominately in Africa, including Madagascar Oil PLC and Global Diamond Resources, of Lesotho and was included in Business Review Weekly's "Rich 200 List" in 2008.

In 2003, Bond was inducted into the America's Cup Hall of Fame. Since 2003, Bond had worked closely with his son Craig and longtime business partner Robert Quinn through Strategic Investments Ltd.

Interests related to the Bond family also control Global Diamond Resources plc (formerly Lesotho Diamond Corporation) which is developing the Kao diamond pipe in the Kingdom of Lesotho. In 2007, the Federal Court rejected an attempt by Bond to sue freelance journalist Paul Barry over an article Barry wrote about his dealings in Africa with the Lesotho Diamond Company. Bond had claimed that the article had several false statements. In 2008 Bond appealed but this, too, was rejected by the same court which found Bond's claims had no reasonable prospects of success.

Bond was involved in a long-running defamation case against The West Australian newspaper and journalists Mark Drummond and Sean Cowan over a series of articles published in December 2005, in which it was alleged that Bond's friend and business partner Robert Leslie Nelson was moving to hide Bond's involvement in Lesotho Diamond Corporation, Madagascar Oil and a gold company. During that case, Bond tried to have the journalists convicted of contempt of court after some electronic documents disappeared.

In 2008, Bond made a return to the Business Review Weekly's "Rich 200 List", in 157th spot, with an estimated wealth of $265 million—thanks primarily to his stakes in Madagascar Oil and Global Diamond Resources.

== Family ==
In 1955, Bond married Eileen Hughes, a member of a prominent Catholic family in Fremantle (she is a cousin of car dealer John Hughes). She and Bond were both 17, and she was pregnant at the time. Bond, who had been raised Protestant, converted to Catholicism for the marriage. The couple had four children: John, Craig, Susanne and Jody. Bond and Eileen divorced in 1992. Susanne, an equestrian showjumper who had been a member of the Australian show jumping team for seven years, died in 2000 from a suspected accidental overdose of prescription medication.

Bond married Diana Bliss, a public relations consultant and theatre producer, in 1995. On 28 January 2012, Bliss was found dead in the couple's swimming pool. Police said the circumstances of her death were not suspicious and concluded that Bliss, a long-time sufferer of depression, had committed suicide.

== Illness and death ==
On 2 June 2015, Bond underwent open-heart surgery at a private hospital in Perth to replace and repair his heart valves. Following complications, he was transferred to Fiona Stanley Hospital in Perth and placed on life support in an induced coma. He died on the morning of 5 June 2015.

== In popular culture ==
In 1986, the British comedy pop group The Barron Knights released a parody of the Jimmy Dean song "Big Bad John", called "Big Bad Bond", referencing both Bond's corruption and winning of the America's Cup.

John Wood portrayed Bond in the miniseries The Challenge (1986), which depicted Australia's famous victory of the 1983 America's Cup.

In the Australian TV miniseries Killing Time (2011), he was again played by John Wood.

The Australian TV miniseries House of Bond (2017) is a heavily fictionalised account of Bond's life. Bond was portrayed by Ben Mingay. It was aired on the Nine Network on 24–25 April 2017.

In 2021, Perth-based psychedelic rock/pop band Pond released a song titled "America's Cup" that would go on to appear on their ninth studio album, 9; the song, which is about the drastic changes brought upon Perth in the aftermath of the 1983 America's Cup, repeatedly mentions Bond with the line, "Alan was a rolling stone".

In real life, Bond was represented by criminal lawyer Andrew Fraser, notable for representing Australian underworld figures and other unsavoury elements. Fraser himself would later become imprisoned.

== Projects and developments ==
=== Western Australia ===
- Observation City in Scarborough, WA
- Yanchep Sun City in Yanchep, WA
- 9 Parker Street in South Perth, WA
- Lesmurdie Heights in Lesmurdie, WA
- South32 Tower (formerly known as the Bankwest Tower, the Bond Tower and the R&I Tower) in Perth, WA
- Bunbury Tower in Bunbury, WA
- Kalgoorlie Super Pit in Kalgoorlie, WA

=== Elsewhere in Australia ===
- Bond University in Robina in the City of Gold Coast, QLD

=== Overseas ===
- Bond Centre in Hong Kong (now known as the Lippo Tower)
