= Australia at the Olympics =

- IOC code: AUS
- NOC: Australian Olympic Committee
- Website: www.olympics.com.au
- Medals Ranked 13th: Gold 189 Silver 198 Bronze 232 Total 619

Summer appearances
- 1896; 1900; 1904; 1908; 1912; 1920; 1924; 1928; 1932; 1936; 1948; 1952; 1956; 1960; 1964; 1968; 1972; 1976; 1980; 1984; 1988; 1992; 1996; 2000; 2004; 2008; 2012; 2016; 2020; 2024; 2028

Winter appearances
- 1936; 1948; 1952; 1956; 1960; 1964; 1968; 1972; 1976; 1980; 1984; 1988; 1992; 1994; 1998; 2002; 2006; 2010; 2014; 2018; 2022; 2026

Other related appearances
- 1906 Intercalated Games –––– Australasia (1908–1912)

Australia has sent athletes to every Summer Olympic Games, as well as every Winter Olympic Games except 1924–32 and 1948. In 1908 and 1912, Australia competed with New Zealand under the name Australasia.

== History ==
=== Beginnings (1894–1904) ===
Australia's inclusion in the Olympic Games began when New Zealander Leonard Cuff, an athletics administrator, organised with both Baron Pierre de Coubertin and head of the English Amateur Athletics Federation Charles Herbert, for Australasia to be represented at the first International Olympic Committee meetings in 1894. While it was initially thought that no Australian (or New Zealand) athlete would be able to compete at the 1896 Summer Olympics, Edwin Flack, an Australian accountant and amateur athlete working in London, was able to obtain leave from work and travelled to Athens, where he won gold in the 800 and 1500 metres, as well as a bronze in the men's doubles tennis, while also participated in the marathon and led the race until withdrawing due to exhaustion. With the Australian Olympic Committee (AOC) not yet founded, Flack was registered to compete by the London Athletic Club, however competed in his local Melbourne running club uniform. Flack would go onto become a member of the Australian Olympic Committee.

The next Olympic Games in 1900, would have three athletes represent Australia in Paris, with two of these athletes winning medals. Frederick Lane would win Australia's first medals in swimming—gold in the 200m freestyle, and bronze in the 200m obstacle race. While Stan Rowley won three bronze medals in the athletics, additionally helping the British team win gold in the 5000m team race. This would be the final Olympics that Australia would compete under the British flag, with the country's foundation occurring six months after the Olympics.

=== The Australasian team (1908–1912) ===
Australia and New Zealand were represented by Australasia, at the 1908 and 1912 games due to the two countries sharing an Olympic committee. The 1908 Summer Olympics would see the debut of future-chairman of the Melbourne Olympic Games Organising Committee Frank Beaurepaire, who won a silver and a bronze in swimming. The only gold medal won by the Australasian team at these Olympics was by the Australian national rugby union team (the 'Wallabies') who were the only other team to compete against the British, winning 32–3.

The next Summer Olympics in 1912, saw 22 athletes compete for the team with all their medals won in the swimming. The only two female athletes sent to compete were Fanny Durack and Mina Wylie in the swimming, who became the first females to win medals in swimming at an Olympic Games, achieving gold and silver respectively in the 100m freestyle. While the other gold medal won by the Australasian team was the men's 4 × 200 m freestyle relay, featuring New Zealander Malcolm Champion alongside Australian's Leslie Boardman, Harold Hardwick and Cecil Healy. Both Australia and New Zealand were due to compete as Australasia again in 1916, only for those Olympics to be cancelled due to World War I.

Despite the successes the joint team had, both countries had multiple disagreements throughout its tenure competing as one, with New Zealand taking steps to separate from the Australasian team in 1911. Both countries would be forced to form a joint Olympic committee in 1914 under an IOC rule to standardise athlete selection for all competing nations, only for New Zealand representatives to leave the meeting before a vote for the presidency was made. When World War I broke out, these discussions for a split were put on hold until its conclusion in 1918, with Australian representative Richard Coombes meeting the IOC in November that year to allow both nations to compete separately, which was granted by the IOC.

=== Split from New Zealand and founding the Australian Olympic Council (1920–1936) ===
The Australian Olympic Council was officially established on April 29, 1920, after the IOC ruling allowing two separate teams for Australia and New Zealand, thus meaning that the Summer Olympics to be held in Antwerp that same year would be Australia's first Olympic competition as their own country. The independent Australian team would win two silvers and one bronze; including its first medal in the race walking, a silver won by George Parker. Thirteen athletes would be sent by the newly installed council, with only one female athlete in the team.

In 1923, the Australian Olympic Council changed its name to the Australian Olympic Federation—known as the AOF—as it prepared to send a new team to the next Olympics held in Paris. Only sending athletes to compete in swimming, diving and athletics, these Summer Olympics saw three gold medals won, including swimmer Boy Charlton in the men's 1500m, diver Dick Eve, and Nick Winter in the men's triple jump. Frank Beaurepaire would become the first Australian to medal in three different Olympic Games, with his bronze medal in the 1500m freestyle.

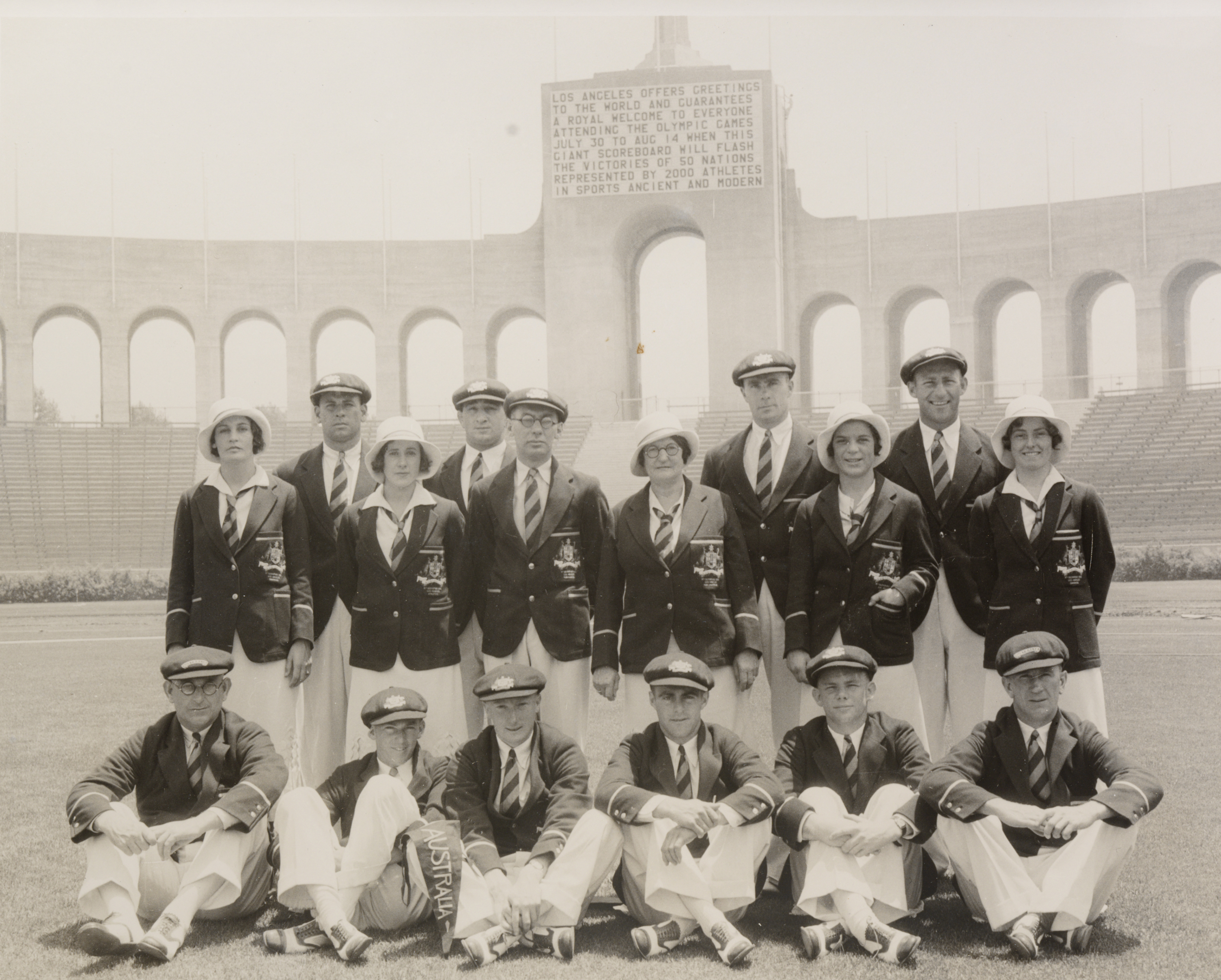
Australian Olympic athletes in 1932 wearing the traditional uniform of a dark green blazer trimmed with yellow, still in use at the London 2012 opening ceremony.

Nineteen athletes were sent by the AOF to Amsterdam in 1928, winning four medals total, including a gold medal by rower Bobby Pearce, two silver medals won by Charlton in the swimming event, and cyclist Dunc Gray achieving bronze. Four years later, a team of twelve athletes were sent to Los Angeles for the 1932 Summer Olympics, with the Australian team achieving three gold medals, all in different sports–Gray in cycling, Pearce in rowing and Clare Dennis in swimming. The majority of the team sent were swimmers, with representatives also participating in athletics and wrestling.

While Australia has focused largely on the Summer Olympics, Australia sent its first representative to the Winter Olympics in 1936, with Ken Kennedy named the first Australian Winter Olympian, although he attended the games on his own with no members or staff from the AOF travelling to accompany him. Kennedy competed in the Speed skating in all four events, with a best finish of 29th in the 500 metres. In the final Olympics before the outbreak of World War II, Australia had its worst Summer Olympic performance in history in 1936, winning only one bronze medal, Jack Metcalfe in the men's triple jump.

=== Winning the bid and hosting the Olympics (1946–1956) ===
When World War II came to an end in 1946, the Victorian Olympic Council began discussions of bidding to host the 1956 Summer Olympics in Melbourne; with the AOF supporting the bid and notified the IOC of its interest in July the same year. The AOF would travel to London for the 1948 Summer Olympics to observe how the Olympics were run, as well as meet with members of the IOC to sway their minds to vote for Melbourne when the ballot commenced. While discussions with the IOC were ongoing, the AOF sent 77 athletes, which made it the largest Australian team sent to an Olympics at the time. Australia won two gold medals, John Winter in the men's high jump and Mervyn Wood in rowing. The team would win a record-breaking 13 medals overall, which included the only Australian Olympic medals won in wrestling, with athletics, swimming and rowing providing the others.

April 29, 1949, the ballot for the 1956 Summer Olympics commenced, with Melbourne and Buenos Aires named the final two bids in contention, with Melbourne victorious by one vote, making it the first Olympic Games in history to be held in a Southern Hemisphere country.

Four years before Melbourne's turn hosting the Olympics, the Australian team competed in Helsinki, winning six gold medals, two silver and three bronze. The Australian women dominated on the short-distance track events, with Marjorie Jackson-Nelson winning both the 100m and 200m gold medals, while Shirley Strickland was victorious in the 80m hurdles, while also winning a bronze medal to Jackson-Nelson in the 100m. Two gold medals were won in cycling, courtesy of Russell Mockridge and Lionel Cox. Australia's only gold medal in the swimming events came in the men's 200m breaststroke, won by John Davies. Australia also returned to the Winter Olympics in the same year in Oslo, sending a team of nine athletes who competed in alpine skiing, cross-country skiing, figure skating and speed skating.

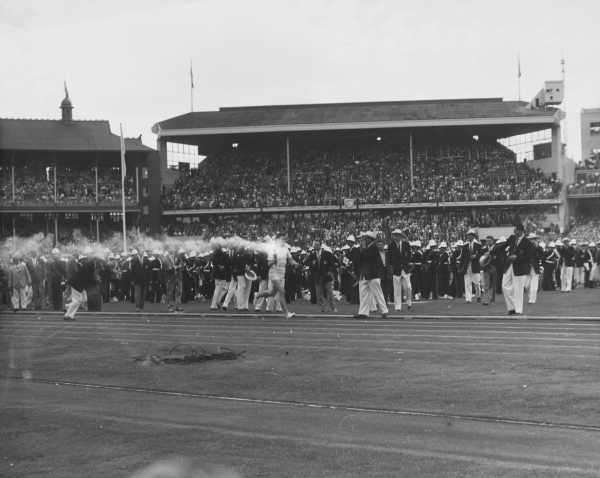
Ron Clarke carrying the Olympic Torch on the way to lighting the Olympic Cauldron at the 1956 Summer Olympics in Melbourne.

The 1956 Summer Olympics would begin in Melbourne with a team of 325 athletes, finishing third on the medal table–the best in Australian Olympic history–with 13 gold, 8 silver and 14 bronze medals. Olympic champion in rowing in 1948, Mervyn Wood, was chosen to lead the Australian delegation and carry the flag during the Opening Ceremony, while future Olympic medallist Ron Clarke lit the Olympic cauldron at the Melbourne Cricket Ground. At the second successive Summer Olympics, Australia's female sprinters in the athletics dominated their events, with Betty Cuthbert winning individual gold medals in the 100m and 200m, Shirley Strickland defending her Olympic title in the 80m hurdles, as well as the women's 4 × 100 m relay featuring Cuthbert and Strickland winning gold in a world record time. The swimming team would have an incredibly successful Olympics, finishing first in the medal tally, with Murray Rose winning three gold medals, Dawn Fraser winning two gold and one silver, and Lorraine Crapp winning two gold, while David Theile and Jon Henricks also won individual gold medals. Due to it being a home Olympic Games, Australia was able to debut in multiple team sports, including basketball, which would see Australia become a frequent medallist in future Olympics.

=== Continued success post-Melbourne Olympics (1960–1972) ===
After the Australian team's success at a home Olympics, they continued to maintain the momentum of success into the next decade. The first Summer Olympics after Melbourne were held in Rome, with three members of the Australian swimming team defending their gold medals in 1960.

In a meeting after the Olympics in Rome, the AOF approved allowing coaches and doctors to be part of the staff for the 1964 Summer Olympics in Tokyo.

Controversy over the size of the Australian team being 'too large,' led to the AOF shrinking the size of the team to 135 competitive athletes for the 1968 Summer Olympics, with the IOC supporting the AOF in the decision after a complaint from the Australian Swimming Union for not allowing their men's water polo team to enter. The team would win five gold, seven silver and five bronze medals; with swimmer Michael Wenden winning two gold, one silver and one bronze; with other medals won in swimming, as well as equestrian, hockey, rowing and athletics. The most famous of these medals being Peter Norman's silver in the men's 200m, standing on the podium alongside Tommie Smith and John Carlos when they performed the Black Power salute, with Norman wearing a human-rights badge in solidarity. The treatment of Norman in the aftermath of the Black Power salute was later criticised, which included rumours of him being excluded of the 1972 Summer Olympic athletic team despite achieving the qualifying time and was given what was described as an "unofficial sanction" conducted the AOF. The existence of a sanction was denied by the AOF at the time, as well as the Australian Olympic Committee as recently as 2012. An apology would be made to Norman in Australian parliament in 2012 for the conduct of Australian Olympic officials after the event and the Australian Olympic Committee would later grant Norman the Order of Merit posthumously in 2018.

The Australian team's performance at the 1972 Summer Olympics was bolstered by the performance of swimmer Shane Gould, who had won five of the seventeen medals won, achieving three gold, one silver and one bronze. Australia's other five gold medals in Munich also came from the swimming squad—who won three more gold—and the sailing team. These Olympics would also witness the most successful Olympics for sprinter Raelene Boyle would win two silver medals in the women's 100m and 200m, these medals being the only medals won by Australia in the athletics event.

=== A halt in success, the founding the Australian Institute of Sport and boycott pressure (1973–1980) ===
While Australia had frequently overachieved at the Summer Olympics, this came to an end at the 1976 Olympic Games. With a predicted target of 29 medals set, expectations were high for the Australian team to continue its Olympic success. Meanwhile, in the background, Malcolm Fraser, who became Prime Minister in November 1975 had cut sports-funding immediately when entering government. This decision would prove to be detrimental to the Australian team once the Summer Olympics in Montreal arrived months later.

After winning at least five gold medals and seventeen total medals at every Olympics since 1956, Australia won zero gold medals and only five medals in total, which became the first time Australia had not won gold since the 1936 Summer Olympics. The sole silver medal was won by the men's field hockey team, with the other medals being bronzes in swimming, sailing and equestrian; finishing 32nd on the medal table. The uproar and embarrassment over the unexpected low result from both members of the public and media, which included a protest outside government house to force an investigation by the Malcolm Fraser-led government, an inquiry into the current structure that the AOF had for its elite athletes and Olympic sporting programs was launched. The resulting inquiry revealing while Australia's Olympic athletes continued to remain on an amateur structured system, most countries had moved onto a state-funded approach, with governments paying athletes to train full-time, which the AOF was not prepared for, nor had the funding from the government to do so. In addition, a lack of enthusiasm towards sports science and sole-focus on only a few sports, allowed other countries to catch up. Bronze medal-winning swimmer Stephen Holland, who was Australia's sole medallist in the sport in Montreal, revealed he received no money to improve his performance in the pool, and had no access to gyms or a 50-metre pool, training solely in a run-down 25-metre pool while being funded by his parents savings. Sprinter Raelene Boyle, who finished fourth in the women's 100m during these games stated to the media, “We were working jobs and being athletes, whereas the rest of the world were just being athletes.”

With the Commonwealth Games being held in Brisbane in six year's time, the Fraser government began to set aside allocated funding to some athletes to ensure that an embarrassing result at a major event on home-soil would not happen, with these changes affecting the Olympic team preparing for the 1980 Summer Olympics.

With a list of countries choosing to boycott the 1980 Summer Olympics held in Moscow, then part of the Soviet Union, a vote was held by the AOF, with pressure from the government, media and national sports federations to join the United States-led boycott, with the AOF choosing to attend the Olympics in a split-vote decision. Thus, the Australian team made the decision to compete in some sports, with some athletes being pressured to skip the games and join the boycott against their wishes. While some members of the swim team chose to attend, both the field hockey and sailing teams made the decision to stay home, while members of the Australian media conducting negative media campaigns to further pressure athletes to refuse their invitations to compete, with allegations of government support in this endeavour. The Australian team also made the decision to compete under the Olympic flag, instead of the national flag, in protest of the Soviet Union's invasion of Afghanistan.

Australia's two gold medals, their first since 1972, were both won in swimming by Michelle Ford and the Quietly Confident Quartet, with two silver's and five bronze medals won overall. Despite having more success than the team sent to Montreal, due to backlash from the Fraser government and members of the public, the Australian team were the only team to not receive a homecoming ceremony, with gold medallist Ford–who was 18-years-old at the time of competing in Moscow–revealing the team were labelled as "traitors" upon their return to Australia and had received "death threats" for attending and competing. Marathon runner Robert de Castella described being hounded by journalists upon his return after attending the Olympics with what he described as, "horrible, disgraceful, despicable comments." Ford revealing in 2025 that funding that was supposed to go to athletes that attended the Olympics instead went to the athletes who chose to boycott. The Australian team from Moscow were not given an official homecoming ceremony until 2025, which was described by some athletes from the team as "too little too late."

=== The beginning of the AIS-era (1981–1989) ===
Although an improvement from Montreal, the performance of the Australian team in Moscow against state-funded athletes subsequently led then-Prime Minister Malcolm Fraser to allow a government-funded program for Olympic athletes in 1981 in what became to be known as the Australian Institute of Sport (AIS). The process saw 800 Australian athletes apply to receive funding by the program. Additionally, not long after the foundation of the AIS, the AOF and the Victorian Olympic Committee launched a bid for Melbourne to host the Summer Olympics in 1988, only for both the federal and Victorian governments to both announce that neither would financially support the bid. The bid was withdrawn by the AOF, and these Olympics would eventually be awarded to Seoul.

Since the formation of the AIS, Australia has finished with fewer than 20 medals only once, in 1988, and has won at least three gold medals at every Summer Olympics since, holding an average of 11 gold medals per Games. The first Olympic event to take place since the establishment of the AIS was the 1984 Winter Olympics in Sarajevo, with a team of 11 athletes sent by the AOF, with a biathlon representative sent for the first time, along with representatives in alpine skiing, cross-country skiing, figure skating and speed skating. However, Winter Olympians were excluded from being given AIS funding, thus, continued to attend the Winter Games as self-funded.

The first Summer Olympics to take place since the foundation of the AIS, was in Los Angeles in 1984. The Australian team had doubled in size, compared to the team sent to Moscow, and won 24 medals overall, its most successful Olympics in 24 years. Four gold, eight silver and 12 bronze medals were won by the team, which included Australia's only ever gold medal in weightlifting, as Dean Lukin won the men's super-heavyweight class. The country won its first gold medal in cycling since 1956, with the men's team pursuit winning in a surprising and unexpected result, as the cycling team was initially left of the funding list by the AIS, and later given a $10,000 fund by AIS director Don Talbot to help fund travel expenses after Talbot disagreed with the AIS board's decision to forgo funding for the cycling team. Australia's other two gold medals came from Jon Sieben in the men's 200m butterfly, and Glynis Nunn in the women's heptathlon. This Olympics saw the widest spread of medal winning sports since the Australian Olympic team was founded, with eight sports winning medals.

In 1985, would see a number of developments within the Australian Olympic setup. The AOF would see a number of changes in leadership personnel, which included Kevan Gosper becoming president of the AOF, and Phil Coles made Secretary-General while also serving as the Australian representative with the IOC. This year would also see the establishment of the Australian Sports Commission, with funding provided the government led by Bob Hawke, with the aim of the Sports Commission's establishment as a way to ensure cohesion between all sports federations within the country. Finally, it was announced that Brisbane would make a bid for the 1992 Summer Olympics, with the ballot taking place a year later. The Brisbane bid eventually placed third overall, the winning bid being Barcelona.

The AOF would decide before the Olympics in Seoul to try and bid for the Summer Olympics again, inviting each Australian city to submit a bid for the 1996 Olympics, with Melbourne emerging victorious over Brisbane. Australia's medal success stagnated in the 1988 Summer Olympics in Seoul, with three gold, six silver and five bronze medals, although sent their second largest team in history. These Olympics saw Australia win its first ever gold medal in a team sport, courtesy of the women's field hockey team, while the other gold medals won came from swimmer Duncan Armstrong in the men's 200m freestyle, and Debbie Flintoff-King in the women's 400m hurdles. After a boost in funding as a result of its men's team pursuit gold medal four years earlier, the cycling team won the most medals in the Australian team for the first time, winning four medals–two silver and two bronze.

=== Successfully bidding for the Sydney Olympics and developing the Winter team (1990–1994) ===
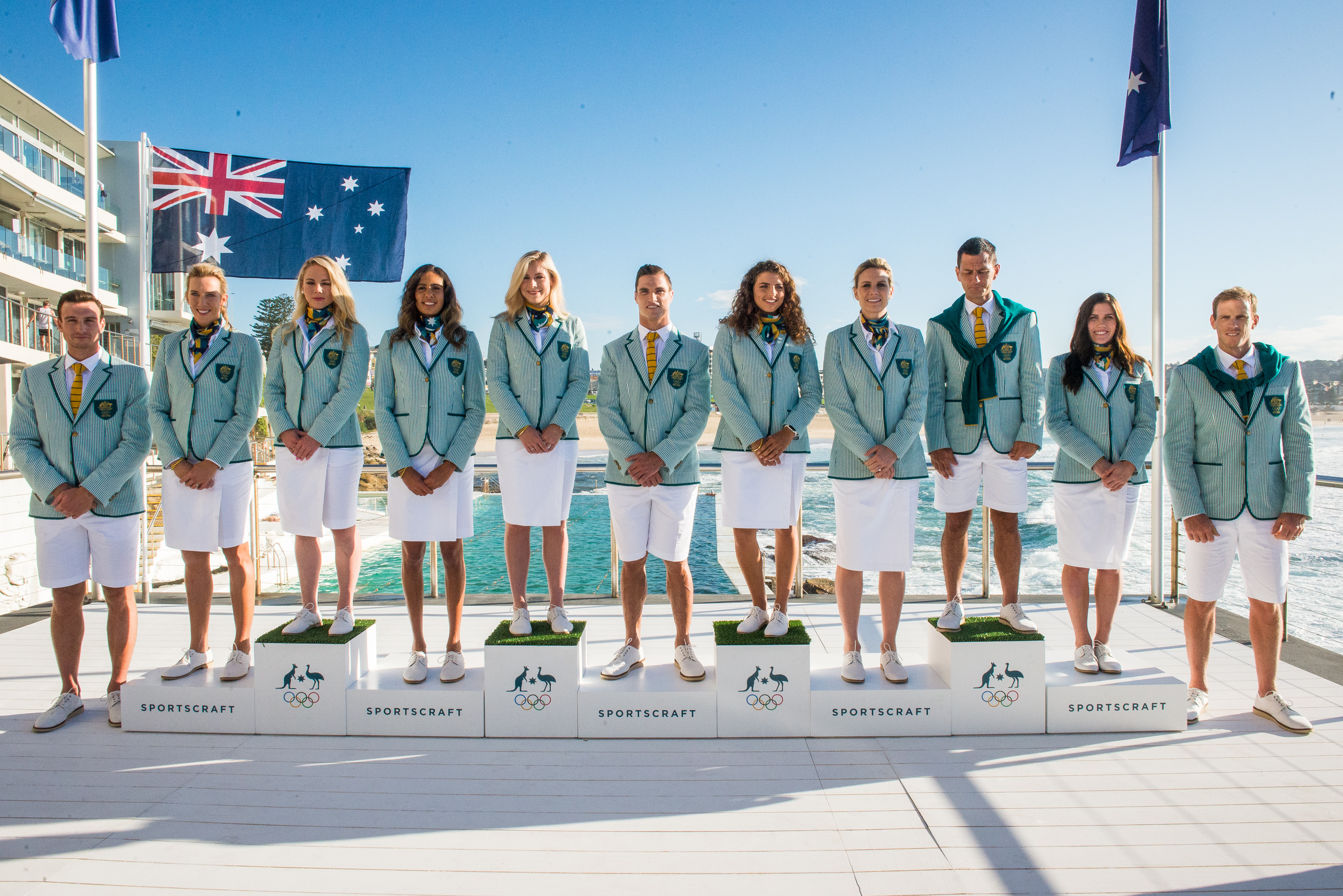
Australian Olympic Team Uniforms unveiled for Rio 2016

On May 19, 1990, the AOF changed its name to the Australian Olympic Committee (AOC), the name it officially remains today. Kevan Gosper, who continued to remain president under the new name change stated that, “We judged the AOF was badly structured, that it was not properly representative of the sports. It was too state-orientated, for historical reasons." The old setup which relied on states making decisions affecting the Australian Olympic movement, the new setup would instead give the sporting bodies the overall say. With this change, six months later the new AOC attended the IOC's conference that would determine the host for the next Summer Olympics after Barcelona, this time in support for Melbourne's bid for the 1996 Summer Olympics, with Melbourne finishing fourth to eventual winner, Atlanta. In May 1991, Gosper would step down as President of the AOC and was succeeded by John Coates.

Still searching for an Olympic medal in the Winter Olympics, with the entrance of short track speed skating into the Olympic program, Australia had an opportunity to win its first ever Olympic medal in a Winter sport, with its men's 3000m relay team entering the games as the reigning world champions at the 1992 Winter Olympics. Unfortunately, a fall in the semi-finals meant that the Australian Winter team would have to continue to wait for its first medal at the Olympics. Paul Narracott would become the first Australian athlete in Olympic history to compete at both the Summer and Winter Olympics, after competing as a sprinter at the 1984 Summer Olympics, he competed in the two-man bobsleigh in Albertville, placing 30th.

Australia entered the 1992 Summer Olympics with a record-breaking 281 athletes, the largest sent to an Olympics since 1956. The country finished ninth on the medal tally, with seven gold, nine silver and eleven bronze medals, the best result for the country since Melbourne 36 years earlier. A record of five sports won gold medals at these games, including the first gold medal won in kayaking for Australia, as Clint Robinson won the men's K1 1000m. For the first time since 1960, a gold medal was won in equestrian, with victories in both the team and individual eventing categories. Matthew Ryan contributed in both gold medals won by the equestrian team, as he became the first Australian to win multiple gold medals in a single Olympics since Shane Gould in 1972. These games saw the Olympic debut of the Oarsome Foursome rowing team, who won gold in the men's coxless fours, while Peter Antonie and Stephen Hawkins won the men's double sculls, winning Australia's first gold medals in rowing since 1948. Cycling and swimming provided the other two gold medals won, with Kathy Watt in the women's road race, and Kieren Perkins in the men's 1500m freestyle.

1993 would see the focus of the AOC turn to preparing for Sydney's bid to host the 2000 Summer Olympics, with the final decision to take place on September 23rd in Monte Carlo, Monaco. After a final presentation of the bid, Sydney was announced as the winning bid to host the Olympics, winning over Beijing by 2 votes. In addition to preparing the bid for Sydney, the AOC began developing training centres and enhanced funding for the Winter Olympics team in preparation, with the country having never won a medal at a Winter Olympics. The Winter Olympic training centre in Axams, Austria was opened in partnership with the Austrian Olympic Committee, with a deal made for the AOC to help the Austrians improve their rowing, canoe, kayak and cycling programs in return for the use of a permanent Winter training centre.

For the first time in Olympic history, the Winter Olympics would be held in a different year to its Summer counterpart, and Australia's Winter Olympic fortunes were about to change. A team of 27 athletes were sent to the 1994 Winter Olympics in Lillehammer, across nine different sports. With aerial skiing making its debut at the Olympics, Kirstie Marshall made her Olympic debut, finishing sixth overall, which equalled Australia's best ever result at any sport at a Winter Olympics, which remained the record for two days. Two years after a fall in the semi-finals in Albertville, the men's short track speed skating relay team won Australia's first ever medal at the Winter Olympics, with Steven Bradbury, Richard Nizielski, Andrew Murtha and Kieran Hansen winning bronze in the men's 5000 metre relay.

=== Sydney Olympics and first medals won in the Winter program (1995–2000) ===
The first Summer Olympics held after the announcement of Sydney's success in being chosen to host in 2000, Australia's performance in 1996 at Atlanta was once again record-breaking, sending it's biggest team and winning the most medals in its history. Nine gold, nine silver and 23 bronze medals were won by the 424 athletes sent, which included the most female representation on an Australian Olympic team. Three gold medallists from Barcelona defended their Olympic titles; rowing team, the Oarsome Foursome, in the men's coxless four, the equestrian eventing team, and Kieran Perkins in the men's 1500m freestyle. Andrew Hoy, who was also a part of the eventing team, also won individual gold in the eventing. The women's field hockey team won gold for the second time, eight years after winning their first. Shooting won their first gold medals in 96 years, with Michael Diamond winning the men's trap, and Russell Mark winning the men's double trap. While Australia's first gold medal in tennis was achieved, courtesy of Todd Woodbridge and Mark Woodforde in the men's doubles. Megan Still and Kate Slatter became the first Australian women to win gold in rowing, in the coxless pairs. Finally, these Olympics would see Susie O'Neill win her first gold medal, coming in the women's 200m butterfly. The success of the Australian team was seen as a pleasant surprise in the lead up to the Olympic Games in Sydney. The Lord Mayor of Sydney, Frank Sartor, was presented with the Olympic flag during the closing ceremony, marking the official lead up towards the home games.

The final Olympic Games to occur before Sydney's turn was the 1998 Winter Olympics in Nagano. The AOC sent 24 athletes to compete, with a goal set by the AOC to return with a medal after achieving their first Winter Olympic medal four years prior. Australia's sole medal would occur in alpine skiing, with Zali Steggall winning Australia's first individual medal in the Winter Olympics, a bronze in the Women's Slalom. Steggall's bronze medal was the key factor in the AOC founding the Olympic Winter Institute of Australia (OWIA), with the separate organising body created to ensure the Winter Olympic team were given the appropriate funding, coaching and programming that their Summer counterparts were experiencing.

=== Continued success post-Sydney (2001–present) ===
The establishment of the OWIA lead to Australia's first Winter Olympic gold medals at the 2002 Winter Olympics with Steve Bradbury winning the Men's 1000 metres and Alisa Camplin winning the Women's aerials. This investment in winter sports was expanded past 2002, with a strong Moguls and Aerials program growing post the 2006 Winter Olympics where Dale Begg-Smith won gold in the Moguls. Leading to a dedicated freestyle skiing facility being built and the majority of Australia's medals coming in the two disciplines.

== Olympic bids and hosted Games ==
=== Hosted Games ===
Australia has hosted the Olympic Games twice and will host again in 2032:

Games	Host city	Dates	Nations	Participants	Events
1956 Summer Olympics	Melbourne, Victoria	22 November–8 December	72	3,314	151
2000 Summer Olympics	Sydney, New South Wales	15 September–1 October	199	10,651	300
2032 Summer Olympics	Brisbane, Queensland	23 July–8 August	TBD	TBD	TBD

=== Unsuccessful bids ===
Australia has unsuccessfully bid for the Games on three other occasions:

Games	Proposed host city	Awarded to
1988 Summer Olympics	Melbourne, Victoria	Seoul, South Korea
1992 Summer Olympics	Brisbane, Queensland	Barcelona, Spain
1996 Summer Olympics	Melbourne, Victoria	Atlanta, United States

== Timeline of participation ==
Olympic Year/s	Teams	
1896–1900	Australia	
1904	Australia	
1908–1912	Australasia	
1920–present	Australia	New Zealand

== Medal tables ==
=== Medals by Summer Games ===
Host country

Games	Athletes	Gold	Silver	Bronze	Total	Rank
(Kingdom of Greece) 1896 Athens	1	2	0	0	2	8
(French Third Republic) 1900 Paris	3	0	0	3	3	18
(United States) 1904 St. Louis	3	0	0	0	0	–
(United Kingdom) 1908 London	as part of Australasia					
(Sweden) 1912 Stockholm	as part of Australasia					
(Belgium) 1920 Antwerp	13	0	2	1	3	16
(French Third Republic) 1924 Paris	37	3	1	2	6	11
(Netherlands) 1928 Amsterdam	18	1	2	1	4	19
(United States) 1932 Los Angeles	12	3	1	1	5	11
(Nazi Germany) 1936 Berlin	33	0	0	1	1	30
(United Kingdom) 1948 London	77	2	6	5	13	14
(Finland) 1952 Helsinki	81	6	2	3	11	9
(Australia) 1956 Melbourne	314	13	8	14	35	3
(Italy) 1960 Rome	188	8	8	6	22	5
(Japan) 1964 Tokyo	234	6	2	10	18	8
1968 Mexico City	175	5	7	5	17	9
(West Germany) 1972 Munich	173	8	7	2	17	6
(Canada) 1976 Montreal	184	0	1	4	5	32
(Soviet Union) 1980 Moscow	123	2	2	5	9	15
(United States) 1984 Los Angeles	240	4	8	12	24	14
(South Korea) 1988 Seoul	270	3	6	5	14	15
(Spain) 1992 Barcelona	290	7	9	11	27	10
(United States) 1996 Atlanta	424	9	9	23	41	7
(Australia) 2000 Sydney	630	16	25	17	58	4
(Greece) 2004 Athens	482	17	16	17	50	4
(China) 2008 Beijing	433	14	15	17	46	6
(United Kingdom) 2012 London	410	8	15	12	35	8
(Brazil) 2016 Rio de Janeiro	422	8	11	10	29	10
(Japan) 2020 Tokyo	470	17	7	22	46	6
(France) 2024 Paris	461	18	19	16	53	4
(United States) 2028 Los Angeles	future event					
(Australia) 2032 Brisbane	future event					
Total (28/30)	6,201	180	189	225	594	10

Notes

- ^{NAT} Athletes at the early Olympic Games (1896–1904) are attributed by the International Olympic Committee (IOC) according to the national affiliation of their club or team, rather than their nationality. (Note: In 2024, the IOC reinstated its original and current attribution policy for athletes at the early Olympic Games (1896–1904). From 2021 to 2024, the IOC briefly attributed medals in individual events according to the athlete's nationality, even when the athlete represented a foreign club or team. Since 2024, participation and medals have instead been attributed according to the national affiliation of the club or team represented by the athlete.)
  - 1900 Olympic Games:
    Australian Frederick Lane competed at the 1900 Summer Olympics, winning two gold medals in the swimming events. As a representative of a British club, his participation and medals were attributed to Great Britain.
  - 1904 Olympic Games:
    Australian Francis Gailey competed at the 1904 Summer Olympics, winning three silver medals and one bronze medal in the swimming events. As a representative of an American club, his participation and medals were attributed to the United States.

=== Medals by Winter Games ===
Games	Athletes	Gold	Silver	Bronze	Total	Rank
(Nazi Germany) 1936 Garmisch-Partenkirchen	1	0	0	0	0	–
(Switzerland) 1948 St. Moritz	did not participate					
(Norway) 1952 Oslo	9	0	0	0	0	–
(Italy) 1956 Cortina d'Ampezzo	8	0	0	0	0	–
(United States) 1960 Squaw Valley	31	0	0	0	0	–
(Austria) 1964 Innsbruck	6	0	0	0	0	–
(France) 1968 Grenoble	3	0	0	0	0	–
(Japan) 1972 Sapporo	4	0	0	0	0	–
(Austria) 1976 Innsbruck	8	0	0	0	0	–
(United States) 1980 Lake Placid	10	0	0	0	0	–
(Socialist Federal Republic of Yugoslavia) 1984 Sarajevo	10	0	0	0	0	–
(Canada) 1988 Calgary	19	0	0	0	0	–
(France) 1992 Albertville	23	0	0	0	0	–
(Norway) 1994 Lillehammer	25	0	0	1	1	22
(Japan) 1998 Nagano	23	0	0	1	1	22
(United States) 2002 Salt Lake City	27	2	0	0	2	15
(Italy) 2006 Turin	40	1	0	1	2	17
(Canada) 2010 Vancouver	40	2	1	0	3	13
(Russia) 2014 Sochi	60	0	2	1	3	24
(South Korea) 2018 Pyeongchang	50	0	2	1	3	23
(China) 2022 Beijing	43	1	2	1	4	18
(Italy) 2026 Milano Cortina	51	3	2	1	6	14
(France) 2030 French Alps	future event					
(United States) 2034 Utah	future event					
Total (21/25)	491	9	9	7	25	21

=== Medals attributed differently by the AOC and the IOC ===
The IOC's totals differ from those of the Australian Olympic Committee (AOC) by 17 medals (5 gold, 7 silver and 5 bronze) won by Australian athletes. The AOC attributes these medals to Australia, whereas the IOC attributes them to different countries or teams:

- 1896: 1 bronze medal won by Edwin Flack in tennis doubles, attributed by the IOC to a mixed team.
- 1900: 2 gold medals won by Frederick Lane in swimming, attributed by the IOC to Great Britain.
- 1904: 4 medals (3 silver and 1 bronze) won by Francis Gailey in swimming, attributed by the IOC to the United States.
- 1908 and 1912: 10 medals (3 gold, 4 silver, and 3 bronze) won by Australian athletes competing for the combined Australasia team at the 1908 and 1912 Olympics. These comprise 8 individual medals (1 gold, 4 silver, and 3 bronze), 1 gold medal won by an exclusively Australian team representing Australasia in the 1908 rugby tournament, and 1 gold medal won by a combined team in 4 × 200 metre freestyle relay swimming event at the 1912 Olympics.

Under the AOC's attribution, Australia is therefore recognised as having won 611 Summer Olympic medals: 185 gold, 196 silver and 230 bronze.

=== Medals by summer sport ===
Sport	Gold	Silver	Bronze	Total
Swimming	74	75	75	224
Athletics	22	29	32	83
Cycling	18	21	23	62
Sailing	14	9	8	31
Rowing	13	15	17	45
Canoeing	8	9	15	32
Equestrian	6	5	4	15
Shooting	5	1	6	12
Field hockey	4	4	5	13
Diving	3	4	8	15
Skateboarding	3	0	0	3
Tennis	2	1	4	7
Triathlon	1	2	2	5
Water polo	1	1	2	4
Weightlifting	1	1	2	4
Beach volleyball	1	1	1	3
Taekwondo	1	1	0	2
Archery	1	0	2	3
Modern pentathlon	1	0	0	1
Rugby sevens	1	0	0	1
Basketball	0	3	4	7
Boxing	0	1	6	7
Softball	0	1	3	4
Wrestling	0	1	2	3
Marathon swimming	0	1	1	2
Surfing	0	1	1	2
Baseball	0	1	0	1
Gymnastics	0	1	0	1
Judo	0	0	2	2
Totals (29 entries)	180	189	225	594

=== Medals by winter sport ===
Sport	Gold	Silver	Bronze	Total
Freestyle skiing	6	4	3	13
Snowboarding	2	4	2	8
Short track speed skating	1	0	1	2
Skeleton	0	1	0	1
Alpine skiing	0	0	1	1
Totals (5 entries)	9	9	7	25

== Medals by individual ==
This is a list of people who have won at least three Olympic gold medals for Australia, based upon data from the International Olympic Committee. Medals won in the 1906 Intercalated Games are not included. It includes top-three placings in 1896 and 1900, before medals were awarded for top-three placings.

=== Summer Olympics ===
Athlete	Sport	Years	Gender	1st place, gold medalist(s)	2nd place, silver medalist(s)	3rd place, bronze medalist(s)	Total
Emma McKeon	Swimming	2016–2024	F	6	3	5	14
Ian Thorpe	Swimming	2000–2004	M	5	3	1	9
**Kaylee McKeown**	Swimming	2020–2024	F	5	1	3	9
**Mollie O'Callaghan**	Swimming	2020–2024	F	5	1	2	8
Dawn Fraser	Swimming	1956–1964	F	4	4	0	8
Ariarne Titmus	Swimming	2020–2024	F	4	3	1	8
Cate Campbell	Swimming	2008–2020	F	4	1	3	8
Libby Trickett	Swimming	2004–2012	F	4	1	2	7
Murray Rose	Swimming	1956–1960	M	4	1	1	6
Betty Cuthbert	Athletics	1956–1964	F	4	0	0	4
Leisel Jones	Swimming	2000–2012	F	3	5	1	9
Petria Thomas	Swimming	1996–2004	F	3	4	1	8
Grant Hackett	Swimming	2000–2008	M	3	3	1	7
Emily Seebohm	Swimming	2008–2020	F	3	3	1	7
**Andrew Hoy**	Equestrian	1984–2020	M	3	2	1	6
Shirley Strickland	Athletics	1948–1956	F	3	1	3	7
**Jessica Fox**	Canoeing	2012–2024	F	3	1	2	6
Shane Gould	Swimming	1972	F	3	1	1	5
Drew Ginn	Rowing	1996–2012	M	3	1	0	4
James Tomkins	Rowing	1992–2004	M	3	0	1	4
Bronte Campbell	Swimming	2012–2024	F	3	0	1	4
Matthew Ryan	Equestrian	1992–2000	M	3	0	0	3
Rechelle Hawkes	Field Hockey	1988–2000	F	3	0	0	3
Jodie Henry	Swimming	2004	F	3	0	0	3
Stephanie Rice	Swimming	2008–2012	F	3	0	0	3

- **People in bold** are still active competitors

=== Winter Olympics ===
Athlete	Sport	Years	Gender	1st place, gold medalist(s)	2nd place, silver medalist(s)	3rd place, bronze medalist(s)	Total
**Jakara Anthony**	Freestyle skiing	2018–2026	F	2	0	0	2
Dale Begg-Smith	Freestyle skiing	2006–2014	M	1	1	0	2
Torah Bright	Snowboarding	2006–2014	F	1	1	0	2
Steven Bradbury	Short track speed skating	1992–2002	M	1	0	1	2
Alisa Camplin	Freestyle skiing	2002–2006	F	1	0	1	2
Lydia Lassila	Freestyle skiing	2002–2018	F	1	0	1	2
**Josie Baff**	Snowboarding	2022–2026	F	1	0	0	1
**Cooper Woods**	Freestyle skiing	2022–2026	M	1	0	0	1
**Scotty James**	Snowboarding	2010–2026	M	0	2	1	3
**Matt Graham**	Freestyle skiing	2014–2026	M	0	1	1	2

- **People in bold** are still active competitors

While Lauren Jackson never won a gold medal, she is the only Australian to win medals in five different Olympics.

== Summary by sport ==
=== Swimming ===
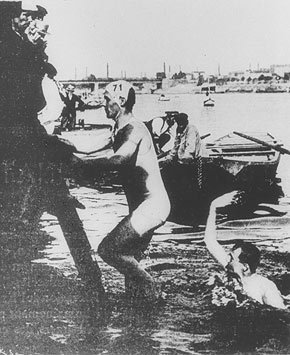
Frederick Lane, wearing cap 71, is Australia's first Olympic champion in swimming, winning two gold medals in 1900 at Paris.

Swimming is historically Australia's most successful sport of all the Olympic events. Australia first competed in swimming at the 1900 Games, with Frederick Lane competing in two events and winning gold medals in both. The first women to compete for Australia in swimming were Fanny Durack and Mina Wylie, who won gold and silver respectively in the women's 100m freestyle at the 1912 Summer Olympics; which was also the first women's swimming event held at an Olympic Games. The sport would become a strength of the nation, which (as of the 2024 Summer Olympics) has the second-most gold and second-most total medals behind the United States. The only Olympics in which Australia finished without a medal in swimming would be 1896 (due to no swimmers being sent by the Olympic committee) and 1936.

At the 1956 Summer Olympics held in Melbourne, Australia finished first on the medal tally for the only time in Olympic history, winning eight of the thirteen events held. These games included a podium sweep in both the men's and women's 100m freestyle, with Jon Henricks and Dawn Fraser winning gold respectively. Murray Rose would become Australia's most decorated swimmer during these Olympics, winning three gold medals, in the men's 400m freestyle, the men's 1500m freestyle and the men's 4 × 200 m freestyle relay. Other gold medals were won by Lorraine Crapp in the women's 400m freestyle, David Theile in the men's 100m backstroke and the women's 4 × 100 m freestyle relay.

Michael Wenden was Australia's most decorated swimmer in 1968, with his gold medals in both the 100m and 200m freestyle, he became the first Australian to win both freestyle events, while also achieving a silver in the men's 4 × 200 m freestyle relay and a bronze in the men's 4 × 100 m freestyle relay. In the 1972 Summer Olympics, Shane Gould would become Australia's youngest Olympic champion in a swimming individual event, while also going on to win three gold, one silver and one bronze during the games.

After 1972, Australia's sporting dominance began to fade; including in the swimming events. Australia only won one medal in 1976, a bronze by Stephen Holland in the men's 1500m freestyle, which became Australian team's worst performance in the swimming events since the country first began participating. In 1980, Australia won two gold medals in the entire Olympics, courtesy of Michelle Ford in the women's 800m freestyle and the Quietly Confident Quartet in the men's 4 × 100 m medley relay. Jon Sieben’s victory in the men’s 200m butterfly would be the only gold medal won by an individual Australian athlete at the 1984 Summer Olympics. Afterwards, 1988 saw Australia take home the least amount of medals in swimming since 1976, Duncan Armstrong win a gold and a silver in the men’s 200m and 400m freestyle respectively, with Australia’s only other swimming medal being Julie McDonald’s bronze in the women’s 800m freestyle.

The 90s saw Australia's reemergence as a swimming powerhouse, although it came slowly and steadily. With an increase in funding throughout the 1980s to combat the disappointing performances of the swimming team, the team were not achieving the high standards set by the Australian government for 1992 Summer Olympics, with the Australian government threatening to cut funding for sport if their standards were not met. The notable turning point was a then 18-year-old, Kieren Perkins, winning gold in the men's 1500m freestyle, with Glen Housman winning silver in the same event; with Perkins setting the world record in the process and his performance at the time being considered "the greatest swim by an Australian." Perkins would win the only gold medal for the swimming team in 1992, while also winning silver in the men's 400m freestyle. The only other Australian swimmer to win multiple medals in Barcelona was Hayley Lewis, who won silver in the women's 800m freestyle and bronze in the women's 400m freestyle. Australia's swimming team continued to push forward its momentum into 1996, winning two gold medals, four silver and six bronze. Susie O'Neill would become the first female swimmer since 1980 to win gold, doing so in the women's 200m butterfly, which in addition had fellow Australian Petria Thomas win the silver medal. The swimming team's most memorable gold medal was Perkins, defending his men's 1500m freestyle gold medal from Barcelona after suffering from a bout of anxiety and as well as a panic attack before the final, becoming the slowest qualifier in the final thus starting in lane eight, finishing six seconds ahead of fellow Australian and silver medallist Daniel Kowalski. Although he would not win gold, Kowalski would become the first swimmer in Olympic history to medal in the 200m, 400m and 1500m freestyle events in a single Olympics.

The 2000 Summer Olympics in Sydney saw Australia achieve their most medals won at the swimming event in a single games, including five gold medals, a haul that would be beaten in Beijing and Tokyo. Three of these gold were courtesy of Ian Thorpe, who won in the 400m freestyle event and contributed to both the men's 4 × 100 m and 4 × 200 m freestyle relays. Notably, Australia's gold medal in the men's 4 × 100 m freestyle relay was the first time in Olympic history that the United States had been beaten in the event. The other two golds were won by Grant Hackett in the men's 1500m freestyle and Susie O’Neill in the women's 200m freestyle. The country's successful performance from a home Olympics continued into 2004, winning seven golds, which included Thorpe and Hackett defending their Olympic titles from four years earlier, while also sharing the podium in a gold-silver finish in the men's 400m freestyle. The Australian women's relay teams won two of the three gold medals on offer at the games in the 4 × 100 m freestyle and medley relays. While Jodie Henry won the women's 100m freestyle and Petria Thomas won her first individual gold medal in the women's 100m butterfly after finishing with silver and bronze medals in her individual events in her previous two Olympics.

Success for Australia's swimming team would continue in Beijing in 2008, with the women contributing to all of Australia's gold medals. Stephanie Rice provided three gold medals in the women's 200m and 400m individual medley events, as well as contributing to the women's 4x200m freestyle relay team. Leisel Jones would finally win her first individual Olympic gold medal in the women's 100m breaststroke, after winning silver and bronze medals in Sydney and Athens. Other gold medals won included Libby Trickett in the women’s 100m butterfly, and the women's 4 x 100m medley relay. After Beijing, Australia's success in swimming would stall during the next two Olympics. The women's 4 × 100 m freestyle relay team would win Australia's only gold in swimming in 2012 and would repeat as Olympic champions in 2016, with Australia's only other gold medals in this period coming from Mack Horton in the men's 400m freestyle and Kyle Chalmers in the men's 100m freestyle, both in 2016. Chalmers, who was 18-years-old at the time he won the event, became Australia's youngest Olympic champion in swimming since Ian Thorpe in 2000.

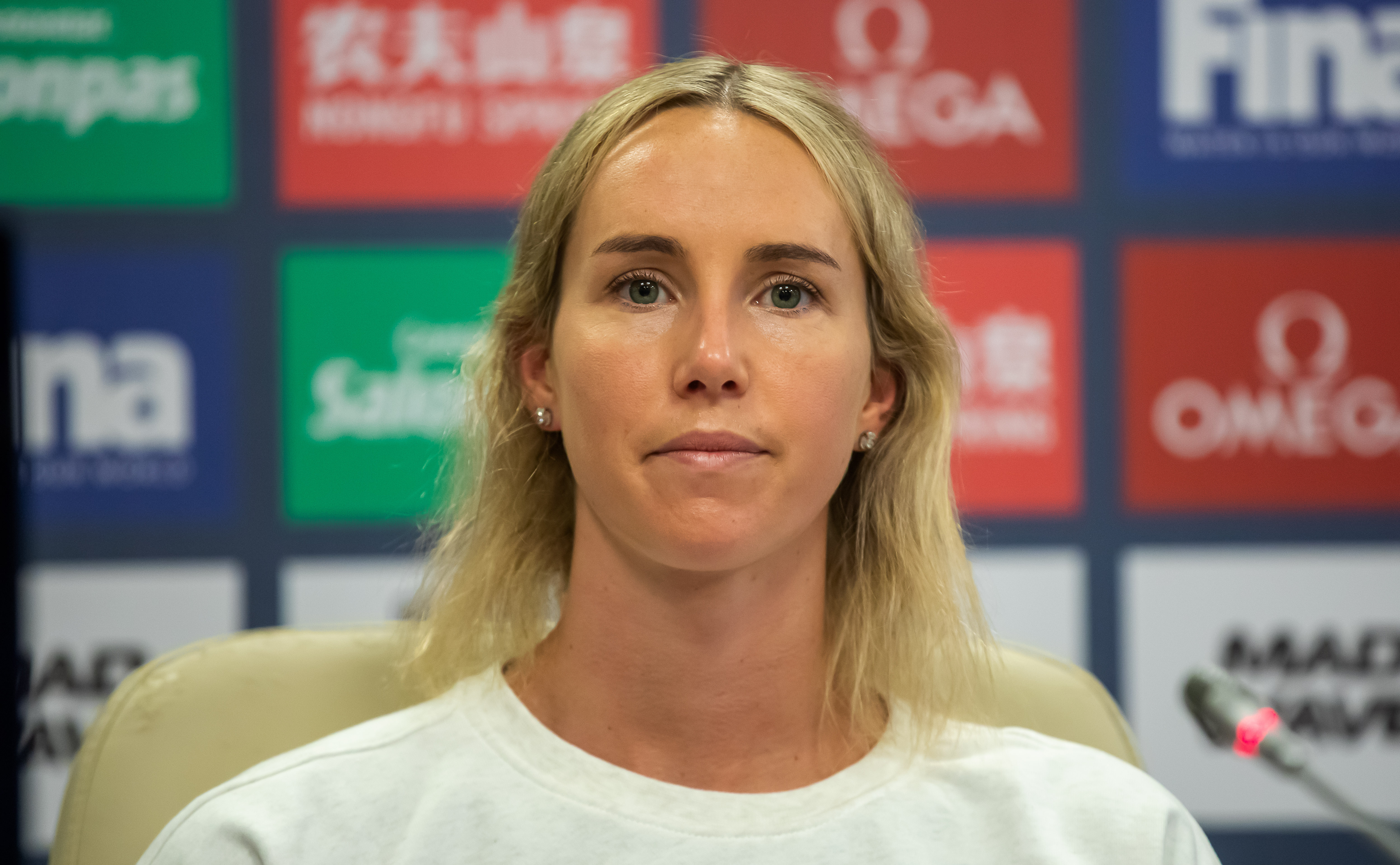
Emma McKeon is Australia's most decorated Olympian, with 14 medals across three Olympics. Her record of four golds and three bronze in 2020 is the most medals won by an Australian athlete at a sole Olympic Games.

The postponed 2020 Summer Olympics in Tokyo saw Emma McKeon have the best Olympic Games medal haul in Australian sporting history, winning four gold and three bronze medals. Two of her golds coming in her individual events the 50m and 100m freestyle, while the other two were part of the 4x100 freestyle and medley relay teams. These Olympics would also feature the debuts of Ariarne Titmus and Kaylee McKeown. Titmus would win double gold in the women's 200m and 400m freestyle; while McKeown would win gold in the women's 100m and 200m backstroke. The only gold medal won in the men's event came from Zac Stubblety-Cook in the men's 200m breaststroke. For the first time, Australia won a medal in open-water events, with Kareena Lee winning bronze in the women's 10km marathon. The whole team would win nine gold, three silver and eight bronze medals throughout the entire discipline.

Australia's success would continue to remain consistent in 2024, with both Ariarne Titmus and Kaylee McKeown defending their individual Olympic titles; with Titmus winning the women's 400m freestyle, while McKeown defended both her women's 100m and 200m backstroke titles. Mollie O'Callaghan would win gold in the women's 200m freestyle, while Titmus would win silver, making it the first Australian gold-silver sweep in an Olympic event since Thorpe and Hackett in the men's 400m freestyle in 2004. The women's 4x100m freestyle relay team would win their fourth gold medal in a row, the longest gold medal streak by an Australian team across all Olympic events; while the women's 4x200m freestyle relay team would also win gold for the first time since 2008. Once again, only one male swimmer would win gold for Australia, this time being Cameron McEvoy in the men's 50m freestyle.

The Paris Olympics would be defined with Australia going head-to-head with the United States, with Australia having an opportunity to beat the United States on the medal table for the first time since 1956. On the final day, both countries were tied with seven gold medals each, with the women's 4x100m medley relay determining which country would top the medal table. The United States would win the event with Australia finishing with the silver medal, meaning Australia would finish second on the medal table, with an overall medal count being seven gold, eight silver, and three bronze medals. A silver medal would later be won by Moesha Johnson in the women's 10km marathon in the open-water events.

Games	Gold	Silver	Bronze	Total	Ranking
Total	76	78	76	230	2

=== Athletics ===
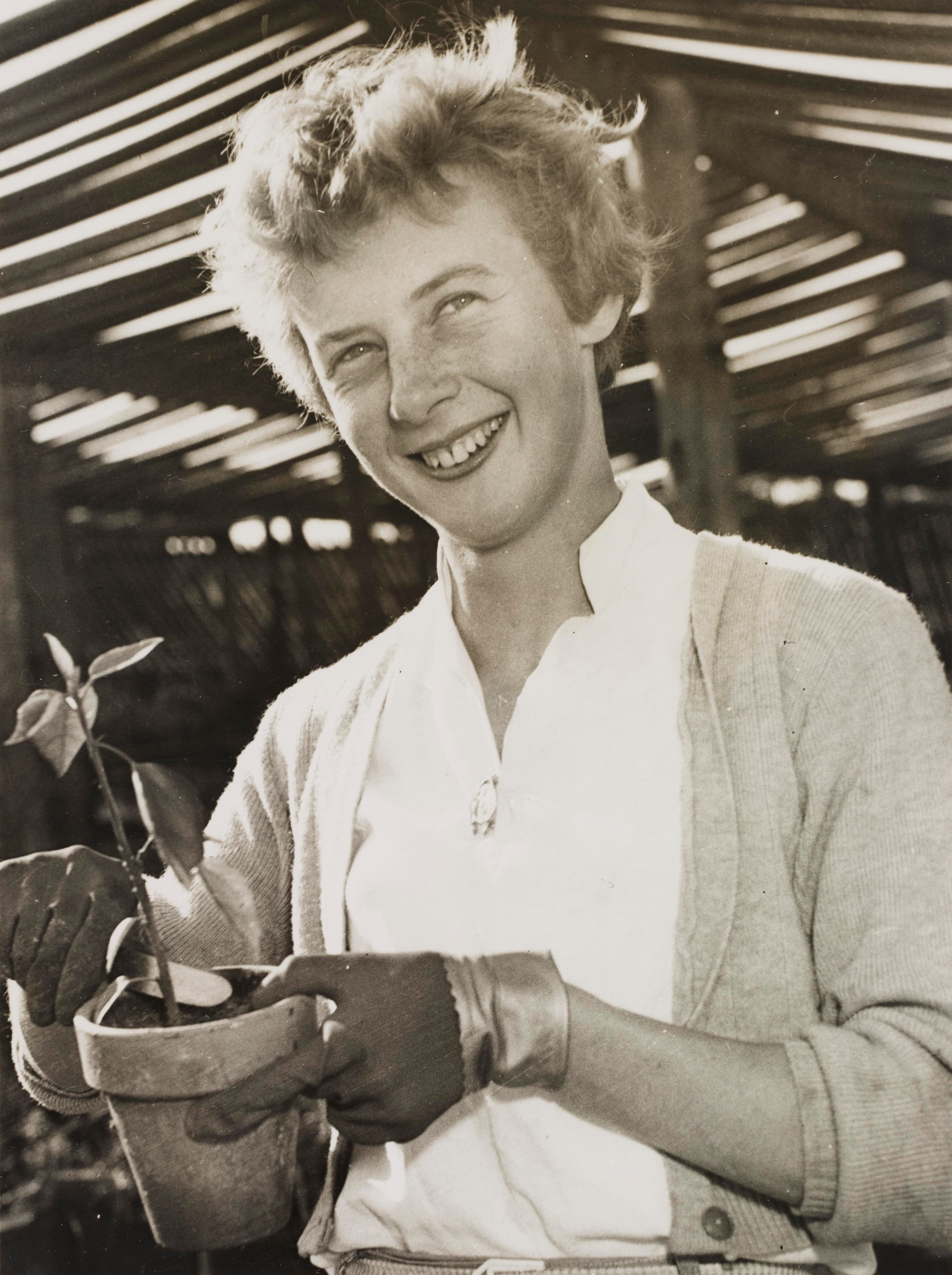
Betty Cuthbert is Australia's most decorated track and field Olympic athlete, winning four golds overall. Three of these would be during the 1956 Summer Olympics in Melbourne.

Australia first competed in athletics at the inaugural 1896 Summer Olympics, with its sole athlete, Edwin Flack, competing in 3 events and winning two of them, the 800m and 1500m. He also competed in the marathon, but withdrew due to exhaustion despite leading with six kilometres left in the race.

In the 1956 Summer Olympics held in Melbourne, the Australian women's team won gold in all four track events that took place during the event, with Betty Cuthbert winning both the 100m and 200m, Shirley Strickland victorious again in the 80m hurdles and the 4 × 100 m relay team, which included both Cuthbert and Strickland, winning in a world record time. Cuthbert in the process became the first Australian to win three gold medals in a single Olympics. These Olympics would become the most successful in Australian athletics history.

Australia would continue to achieve podium places and the occasional gold medal throughout the 1960s. Herb Elliott would win gold in the men's 1500m in a world record time in 1960. Betty Cuthbert won her fourth gold medal in her career, this time in the women's 400m in 1964, which made her the most decorated track and field athlete in Australian Olympic history. While 1968 saw Ralph Doubell emerge as gold medallist in the men's 800m, Maureen Caird winning gold in the women's 80m hurdles, while Peter Norman won silver in the men's 200m, with Norman famously standing on the podium alongside Tommie Smith and John Carlos when they performed the black power salute.

Sydney would host the 2000 Summer Olympics, with Australia's sole gold medal being Cathy Freeman’s women's 400m, with the only other medals won being silver medals for Jai Taurima in the men's long jump and Tatiana Grigorieva in the first ever women's pole vault competition.

Between 2004 and 2016, winning medals were also sparse, with only three gold medals won by Australian athletes. Steve Hooker won the men's pole vault in 2008 and became the first Australian man to win an athletics gold medal since 1968. While the 2012 Summer Olympics saw two gold medals for Jared Tallent in the men's 50km race walk, and Sally Pearson in the women's 100m hurdles. Pearson also won a silver in the same event in 2008. Most of Australia's medals in athletics during this period came from race walking; with the exception of Hooker and Pearson's medals, along with the men's 4 × 400 m relay silver medal in 2004, and Mitchell Watt’s silver in the men’s long jump in 2012. The postponed Tokyo Olympics saw three medals awarded; Nicola Olyslagers (competing under her maiden name McDermott) achieving silver in the women’s high jump, as well as bronze medals for Kelsey-Lee Barber in the women’s javelin and Ashley Moloney in the men’s decathlon.

2024 became Australia’s most successful Olympic athletics campaign since 1956, with one gold, two silver and four bronze. The sole gold medal was won by Nina Kennedy in the women’s pole vault, which was the first gold medal to be won by a female field athlete. Jessica Hull finished with the silver medal in the women’s 1500m, the first by an Australian in any distance running event since 1968. In addition for the first time since 1968, two Australian athletes shared the podium in the same event with Nicola Olyslagers and Eleanor Patterson winning silver and bronze in the women’s high jump. Bronze medals were also won by Matthew Denny in the men’s discus, Jemima Montag in the women’s 20km race walk, as well as Montag and Rhydian Cowley in the mixed-relay walk.

Games	Gold	Silver	Bronze	Total	Ranking
Total	22	29	32	83 (Note: Does not include a gold medal for the 5000 metres team race, in which an Australian runner competed with runners from Great Britain.)	11

=== Basketball ===
Australia first entered an Olympic basketball tournament in 1956, with the men's team participating for the first time; while the women's team made their first appearance in 1984, finishing 5th overall. They are among one of the most successful basketball nations to have not won an Olympic gold medal, with seven medals overall, three silvers and four bronzes; only France and Spain have had more success without winning a gold medal.

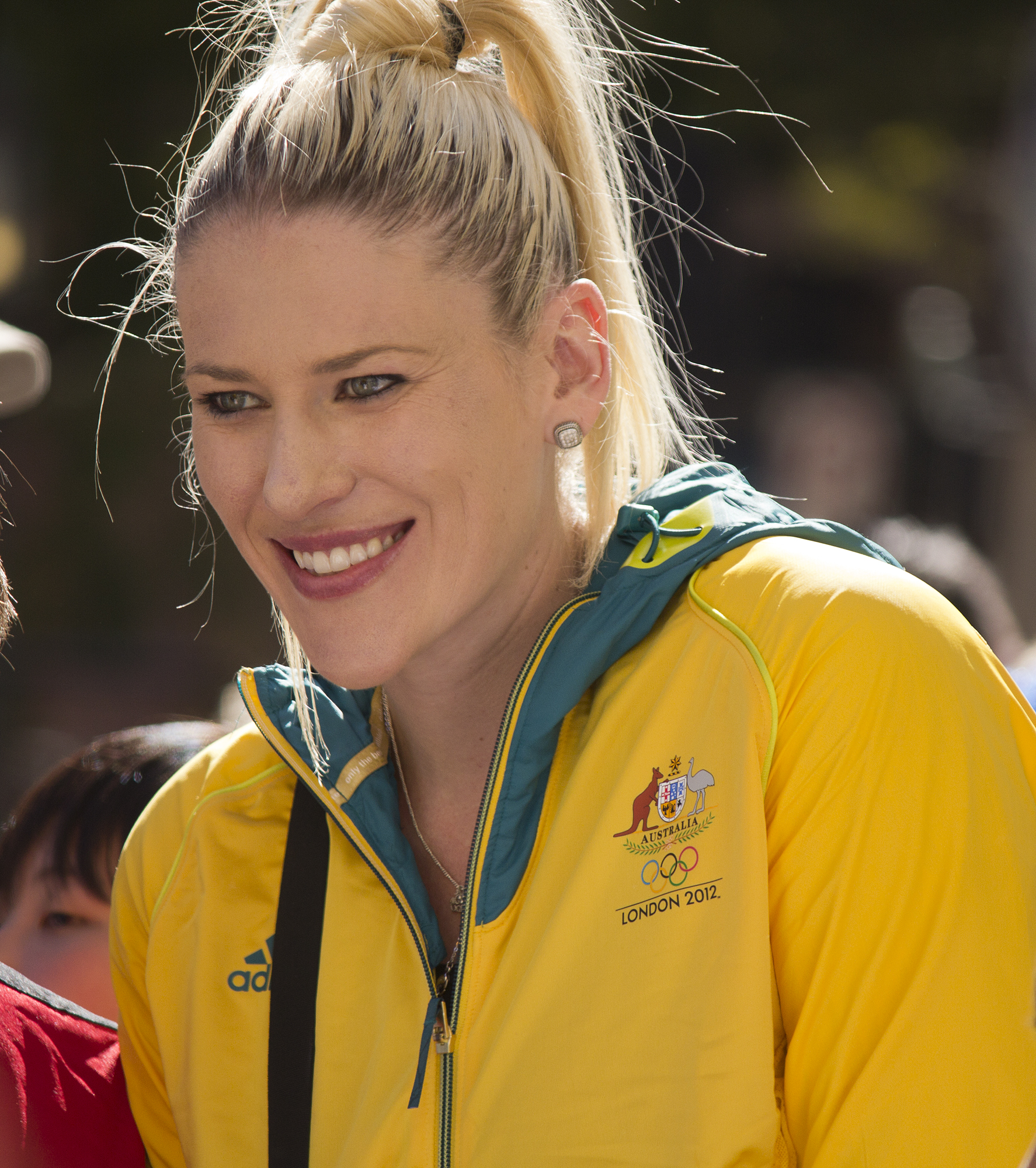
Lauren Jackson (pictured during the 2012 Summer Olympics), won five medals with the Australian women's team, including three silver and two bronze medals. She is the first Australian athlete to achieve a medal across five different Olympic Games.

Most of Australia's success in basketball has come from the women's team–commonly known as the Opals–who have participated in every tournament since their debut appearance, with the exception of 1992. The Opals won their first Olympic medal, a bronze medal, in 1996, which also became Australia's first ever medal in basketball. They would go one position better in 2000, winning silver in Sydney, losing to frequent gold medal winners the United States in the final. The Opals would continue their medal-winning streak, finishing with silver in 2004 and 2008, and bronze in 2012. Their medal streak would end in 2016, after progressing through the pool stage undefeated, they suffered a surprising loss to Serbia in the quarterfinals, which became Australia's worst women's basketball result in 32 years. 2020 would also continue to be a challenge for the team, after losing two pool matches, they would be eliminated by the United States in the quarterfinal. After eight years of no medals won, the Opals would win bronze in 2024, winning over Belgium.

The Australia men's basketball team–known as the Boomers–have participated in every Olympic Games since 1956, with the exception of 1960 and 1968. The first taste of success for the Boomers would occur with a fourth place in 1988, and would continue to place fourth in 1992 and in 2000. The Boomers would be eliminated in the quarterfinals in 2008 and 2012. Their presence on the world stage became particularly notable in 2016, which would end in a heartbreaking fourth once more, this time losing the bronze medal match to Spain, when leading with five seconds to go, Spain was given two free throws which put them in the lead in the final seconds of the game. In the delayed 2020 Summer Olympics, the Boomers finished their pool undefeated and eliminated Argentina in the quarterfinal. They would lose to the United States in the semi-final, with a bronze medal match against Slovenia to come. Ultimately, the Boomers would end their major tournament curse of fourth-place finishes, winning a long-awaited medal in a 107-93 victory.

Games	Gold	Silver	Bronze	Total	Ranking
Total	0	3	4	7	8

=== Canoeing ===
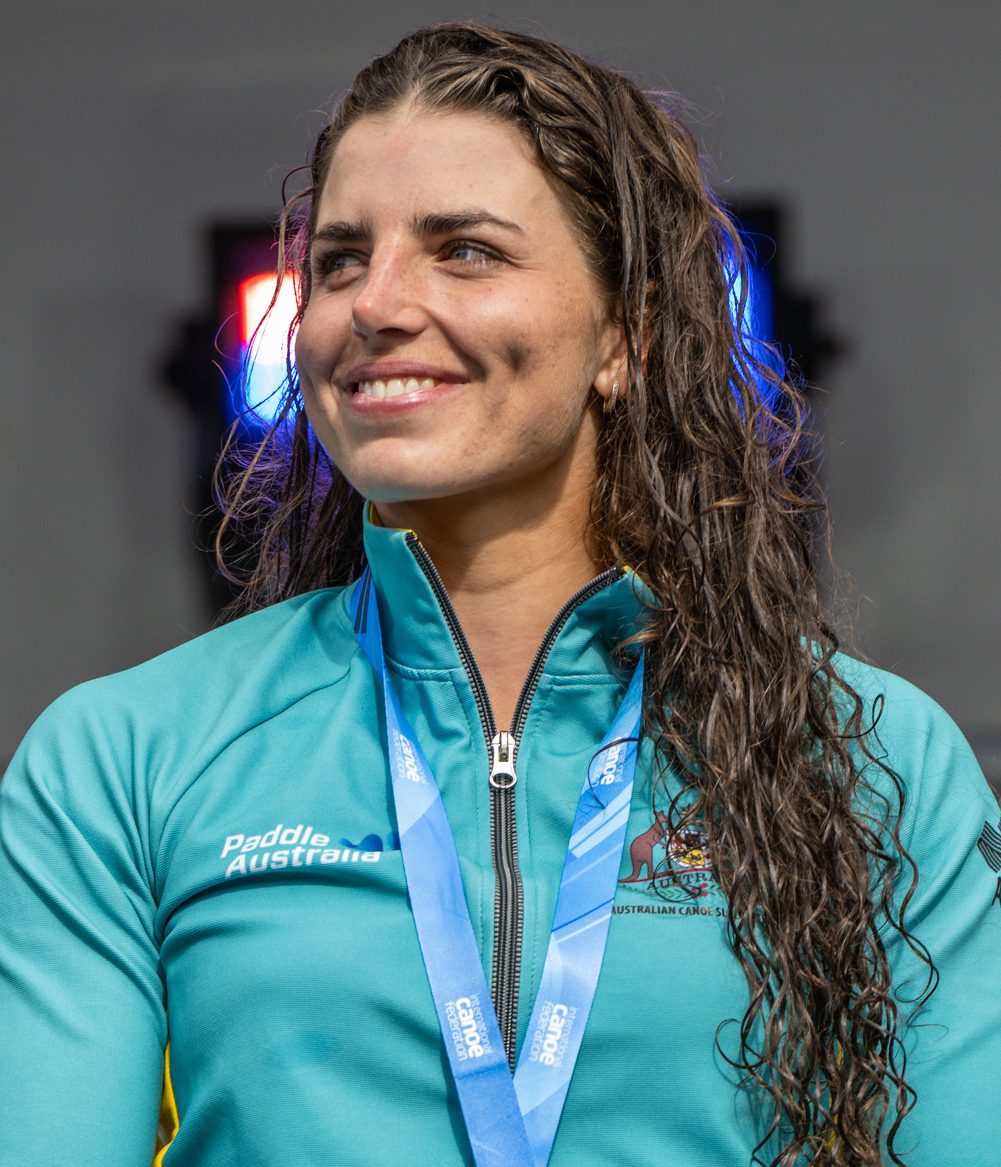
Jessica Fox is Australia's most successful Olympian in canoeing, achieving three gold, one silver and two bronze medals throughout her career in the slalom discipline.

Australia's first participation in canoeing events would occur in 1956, with a bronze medal won by Dennis Green and Wally Brown in the men's K-2 10,000m event. The next medal in the sport would not occur until 1980, as John Sumegi finished with silver in the K-1 1000m sprint. After a close call in 1988, which saw Grant Davies originally awarded gold, only to be given silver after the finish was reinspected by officials; Australia's first Olympic gold in canoeing would occur in 1992 with Clint Robinson winning the men's K-1000 sprint. Robinson would go onto win a K-1 1000m bronze medal in 1996 and a K-2 500m silver in 2004, the latter partnering with Nathan Baggaley. Australia's next two gold medals in the sport would be won by Ken Wallace in 2008 for the men's K-1 500m, and the men's K-4 1000m sprint team in 2012.

The canoe slalom events would debut in 1992, with Danielle Woodward winning silver in the women's K-1. Australia would win two medals in 2008, with Jacqueline Lawrence and Robin Bell achieving silver and bronze respectively. 2012 would see the Olympic debut of Jessica Fox, who would emerge as the silver medallist in the women's K-1, later adding a bronze to her collection in 2016 in the same event.

The beginning of the 2020s would see Australia have two record-breaking hauls of medals in back-to-back games for the country. Two gold medals were won by Australia during the postponed 2020 Olympics, with Jessica Fox winning in the first-ever women's C-1 slalom, and Thomas Green and Jean van der Westhuyzen in the K-2 1000m sprint. Fox would also win bronze in the women's K-1 slalom. In 2024, Australia would have its most successful Olympics in canoeing, due to the success of Jessica Fox and her sister Noemie in the slalom events. Jessica would win double gold in the K-1 and would repeat as gold medallist in the C-1 event, while Noemie emerged as the sports first gold medallist in the women's kayak cross event, which included eliminating her sister along the way.

Games	Gold	Silver	Bronze	Total	Ranking
Total	8	9	15	32	9

=== Cycling ===
Australia's cycling success began in 1928 with Dunc Gray winning bronze in the men's time trial, with Gray also going on to win Australia's first gold in the sport four years later. The next gold medals won by Australian athletes would come in 1952, with Russell Mockridge winning both the men's time trial, as well as partnering with Lionel Cox to win the tandem event. The only cycling gold medal won during the 1956 Olympics in Melbourne was by Ian Browne and Tony Marchant in the men's tandem.

Australia would have to wait 28 years for another gold medal in cycling, with the men's team pursuit winning in Los Angeles in an upset victory over the American team. After being initially left of the funding list for the newly established Australian Institute of Sport, they were given a $10,000 travel expense payment, the team travelled to the Olympics as underdogs, beating Italy in the semi-final, and emerging victorious over the heavily-favoured American team competing at home in the final. Notably, the final featured Michael Turtur racing with a broken wrist. The performance of the men's pursuit team would lead to a significant increase of funding for Australian cyclists, which would see medal success in the sport for the next 20 years after the breakthrough. Cycling would be Australia's most decorated sport and biggest medal contributor out of all sports in 1988, winning two silver and two bronze medals. Kathy Watt would win both Australia's first gold medal in a road cycling event and first gold for an Australian female cyclist in 1992 with her victory in the women's road race, while going onto win silver in the 3000m individual pursuit on the track. While Australia's sole gold medal in Sydney came from Brett Aitken and Scott McGrory in the men's madison.

The best Olympic Games for the cycling team would emerge in 2004, with the team winning six gold, the most won by Australian cyclists in a single Olympics. Ryan Bayley became the first Australian cyclist to win gold medals in two individual events—men's sprint and keirin. Anna Meares would win her first Olympic gold medal in her career in the women's 500m time trial. While, Stuart O'Grady and Graeme Brown defended Australia's gold medal in the men's madison; with Brown also contributing to Australia's victory in the men's team pursuit. Brad McGee, who was part of the men's pursuit team, won his first gold medal after winning one silver and three bronze medals previously, which made him Australia's most decorated Olympic cyclist, taking his total medal count to eight. Additionally, Sara Carrigan would win the women's road race, Australia's first win on the road since Watts 12 years earlier.

From 2008 to 2021, Australia's success in cycling was rare, with the only two gold medals won during this period being Anna Meares in the women's sprint in London, and Logan Martin in the first men's BMX freestyle event in Tokyo. Other medals won during this period included Sam Willoughby winning Australia's first medal in the BMX discipline, a silver in the race event in 2012; Meares and Kaarle McCulloch’s bronze in the women’s team sprint in London; and the men’s pursuit team finishing on the podium in 2012, 2016 and 2020.

2024 would see three gold medal droughts end for the Australian cycling team in Paris. The first of which was Grace Brown in the women’s time trial, with it being Australia’s first gold in any sport during the games and Australia’s first cycling gold medal on a road-based event in 20 years. After a silver in 2012 and 2016, and a bronze in 2020, the men’s pursuit team won Australia’s first gold medal in the velodrome since Meares 12 years earlier, along with a world record time in the qualification round, courtesy of the quartet of Sam Welsford, Conor Leahy, Kelland O’Brien and Oliver Bleddyn. The victory in the pursuit ironically came 20 years after Australia’s last victory in the event and 40 years since its first ever win in the event. Finally, Saya Sakakibara won Australia’s first gold medal for a female athlete in the BMX discipline, winning the women’s race.

Games	Gold	Silver	Bronze	Total	Ranking
Total	18	21	23	62	6

=== Diving ===
Australia would first enter the diving events in 1908 with Snowy Baker finishing 22nd in the springboard event, who in addition won silver in boxing during the same Olympic Games. The first gold medal won by Australia was Dick Eve in 1924 in the men's high diving, an event that has since been discontinued from the Olympics. Australia would not win another medal until their home games in 2000 when won two bronze medals were won by in Robert Newbery and Dean Pullar the men's 3m synchronised springboard, and Rebecca Gilmore and Loudy Tourky in the women's synchronised 10m platform. Four years later, Chantelle Newbery would win Australia's second-ever diving gold medal in the women's 10m platform, with Tourky winning bronze in the same event.

Australia's success in diving continued in 2008, with Australia's third, and most recent, gold medal won by Matthew Mitcham in the men's 10m platform, who performed the then highest-scoring dive in Olympic history in the final round. Mitcham was notably the only diver to win gold in Beijing outside of the Chinese team, meaning Australia would finish second on the medal tally. Historically, Mitcham's victory made him the first openly gay male athlete in Olympic history to win a gold medal. Additionally, Briony Cole and Melissa Wu won silver in the women's synchronised 10m platform event.

Australia has continued to win at least one medal per Olympic Games since 2008, all won by women. The sole medal won by the diving team in 2012 was Brittany Broben's silver in the women's 10m platform, while Anabelle Smith and Maddison Keeney's bronze medal in the women's synchronised 3m springboard was the lone medal won in 2016. Melissa Wu would win the only diving medal for Australia in 2020, a bronze in the women's 10m platform. While, Keeney won her first individual medal, a silver in the women's 3m springboard in 2024.

Games	Gold	Silver	Bronze	Total	Ranking
Total	3	4	8	15	7

=== Field hockey ===
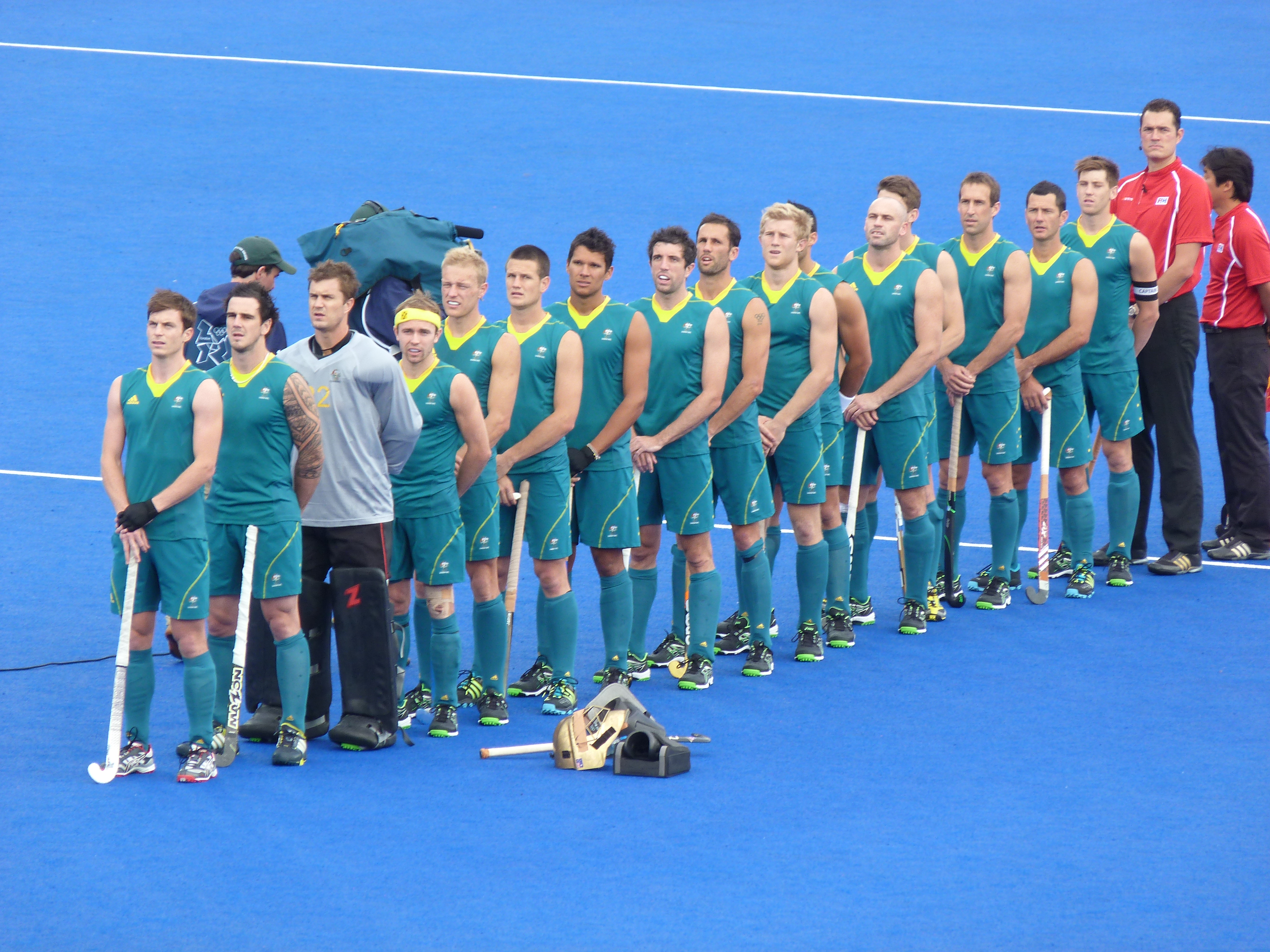
The Australian men's national field hockey team, known as the Kookaburras, during the 2012 Summer Olympics. They would subsequently win bronze at the tournament.

Australia's most successful team sport in the Olympic Games, both the women's and men's hockey teams have witnessed success as Olympic champions and medallists.

The women's team, known as the Hockeyroos, has seen much success throughout their Olympic history. Australia would first enter a women's field hockey team in 1984, winning their first gold medal four years later in Seoul. After finishing without a medal in Barcelona, the Hockeyroos would win gold in 1996 and at their home Olympics in Sydney in 2000. Rechelle Hawkes was the only player to be involved in all three gold medal-winning teams. The women's team have not achieved a medal since Sydney, finishing fifth in the next three Olympics afterwards, and sixth in 2020 and 2024.

Entering the sport during a home Olympics in Melbourne in 1956, the men's team, known as the Kookaburras, would win their first medal, a bronze in Tokyo eight years later. In 1968, the Kookaburras would upgrade to a silver medal for the first time, with their next medal being a silver again in 1976. The men would not achieve a medal throughout the 1980s, eventually winning another silver in 1992, followed by two bronzes in 1996 and 2000. They finally achieved a gold medal in 2004, bringing a 52-year wait to an end. They would achieve bronze medals in 2008 and 2012, would win silver in 2021 at the delayed Tokyo Olympics, which was decided in a penalty shootout against eventual Olympic champions, Belgium.

Games	Gold	Silver	Bronze	Total	Ranking
Total	4	4	5	13	3

=== Freestyle skiing ===
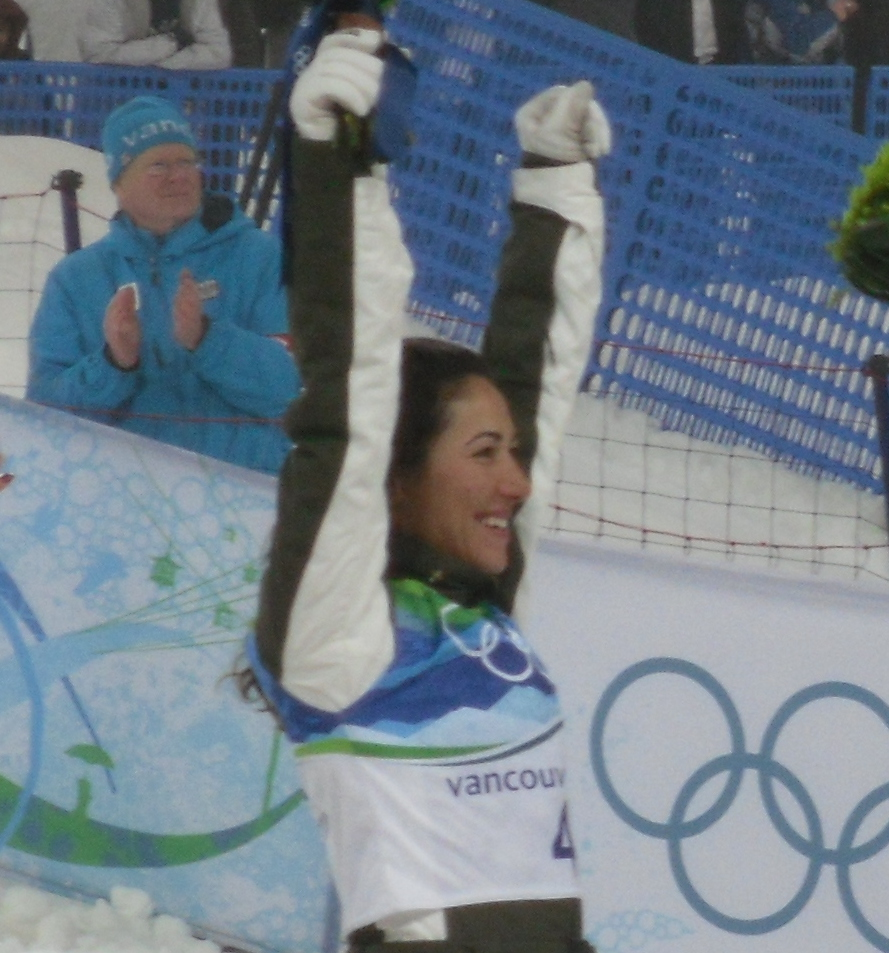
Lydia Lassila (pictured in 2010), is a five-time Olympian and two-time Olympic medallist in the women's aerials. She won gold in 2010, and bronze in 2014.

Australia's most successful sport in the Winter Olympics, the Australian team began consistently medalling at the Olympics from the beginning of the 2000s, with Alisa Camplin winning Australia's first medal—a gold—in the women's aerials in 2002. All of its medal success has consistently come from the moguls and aerials disciplines.

Aerials would be added to the Olympics in 1994, with Australia sending world champion Kirstie Marshall, who would finish sixth in the event after qualifying first in the opening round. Alisa Camplin would become Australia's first female Winter Olympic gold medallist in 2002 and would later add a bronze medal in 2006, all in the women's aerials event. Australia's success in the women's aerials would continue in 2010, Lydia Lassila winning gold, four years after an injury during the qualification rounds in Turin that ruled her out of the Olympics. 2014 would see the Australian team win two medals at the same Olympics for the first time, with David Morris winning Australia's first medal, a silver, in the men's event; while Lassila would win bronze in the women's. After not medalling in 2018 and 2022, Danielle Scott at her fourth Olympics would break the medal drought in 2026, winning silver in the women's event. 2026 would also see Australia qualify for the mixed team aerials event for the first time, with Scott, Abbey Willcox and Reilly Flanagan unexpectedly finishing fourth.

Australia's success in the moguls began in the 2000s, with Dale Begg-Smith winning gold in 2006, and silver in 2010. With the exception of 2014, Australia has won a medal in the moguls in every Olympics since. The first of these being a silver medal from Matt Graham in the men's moguls in 2018, while Australia's first medal in the women's event would occur in 2022, courtesy of Jakara Anthony winning gold in the women's moguls. 2026 would witness Australia becoming the best performing country competing in the moguls events at an Olympics for the first time, with two gold medals achieved by Cooper Woods in the men's moguls, and Anthony in the women's dual moguls, and a bronze, won by Graham in the men's dual moguls. Anthony, with her win in the women's dual moguls subsequently became the first Australian in history to win two gold medals at the Winter Olympics.

Games	Gold	Silver	Bronze	Total	Ranking
Total	6	4	3	13	5

=== Rowing ===
Australia's first participation in rowing was during the 1912 Summer Olympics, with its first gold medal won in 1928 by Bobby Pearce in the men's single sculls. Pearce would repeat as Olympic champion in 1932, with Mervyn Wood winning the same event in 1948.

Australia's most famous rowing team, the Oarsome Foursome made their debut in 1992, winning gold in the men's coxless four. The original team that won gold in Barcelona consisted of Andrew Cooper, Nick Green, Mike McKay and James Tomkins. They would defend their gold medal in Atlanta four years later with Drew Ginn replacing Cooper. Members of the group would go onto win medals in other events in the sport through to 2012. Tomkins and Ginn would win gold in the men's coxless pair in 2004. Tomkins would also win a bronze medal in the men's coxless pairs in 2000, while McKay would switch to the eight's event, winning silver in 2000 and bronze in 2004. The last of the Oarsome Foursome to win an Olympic medal was Ginn, medalling in 2012 as part of the silver medal-winning men's coxless four.

Australia would unexpectedly win both the men's and women's coxless four events in Tokyo, with the men's team notably breaking a 20-year winning streak for the British men's team, earning them their first win in the event since the Oarsome Foursome era.

Games	Gold	Silver	Bronze	Total	Ranking
Total	13	15	17	45	7

=== Sailing ===
The first Australian sailing team to appear in an Olympic Games would occur in 1948, with Jock Sturrock, Len Fenton and Robert French as the chosen sailors. Australia's first medals in the sport—a silver and a bronze—occurring eight years after their debut during a home Olympics in Melbourne, a silver courtesy of Rolly Tasker and John Scott in the Sharpies class, and a bronze medal from Sturrock, Dev Mytton and Doug Buxton in the 5.5 metre class. 1964 would see Australia win its first gold medal, coming in the 5.5 metre class, with skipper Bill Northam at the age of 60 becoming the oldest Australian Olympic gold medallist, winning alongside Peter O’Donnell and James Sargeant. The next gold medals would both arrive in 1972, which included; John Cuneo, Tom Anderson and John Shaw winning the Dragon class, and David Forbes and John Anderson in the Star class. 1976 would see two bronze medals awarded to Australia, one of these bronze medals won by John Bertrand in the Finn class, who would go onto become the skipper on the victorious Australia II, in the 1983 America's Cup.

From 1976 until 1996, Australia would win one silver and four bronze medals, three of these medals occurring in the Tornado class, including a silver medal won by Mitch Booth and Andrew Landenberger in 1996. The Sydney Olympics in 2000 would see Australia break their gold medal drought on home soil, sweeping the men's and women's 470 events, courtesy of Tom King and Mark Turnbull in the men's, and Jenny Armstrong and Belinda Stowell in the women's. Although this success was short lived, with Australia finishing with no medals in 2004, the first time no Australian sailors had not achieved a top three placing since 1988.

2008 would see Australia repeat their success from 2000, with Malcolm Page and Nathan Wilmot, and Tessa Parkinson and Elise Rechichi sweeping the men's and women's 470 classes for the second time in Australian Olympic history. They would also win a silver medal with Darren Bundock and Glenn Ashby in the men's Tornado. The Australian sailing team would continue their success in 2012, becoming the most successful sailing nation competing in London, with three gold medals and one silver. The only returning gold medallist, Page, returned to successfully defend his 470 class title, this time alongside Mathew Belcher. Tom Slingsby would win gold in the laser, while Nathan Outteridge and Iain Jensen emerged victorious in the 49er. Success would continue to follow in 2016, with one gold medal—Tom Burton in the men's laser—and four silver medals.

After victories by Slingsby and Burton in the previous two Olympics, Australia won their third consecutive gold medal in the men's laser in Tokyo, this time with Matthew Wearn, while Belcher would win his second gold medal in the 470, this time alongside Will Ryan. Wearn would also win gold in the laser event in 2024, becoming the first sailor to win back-to-back Olympic titles in the event.

Games	Gold	Silver	Bronze	Total	Ranking
Total	14	9	8	31	5

=== Skateboarding ===
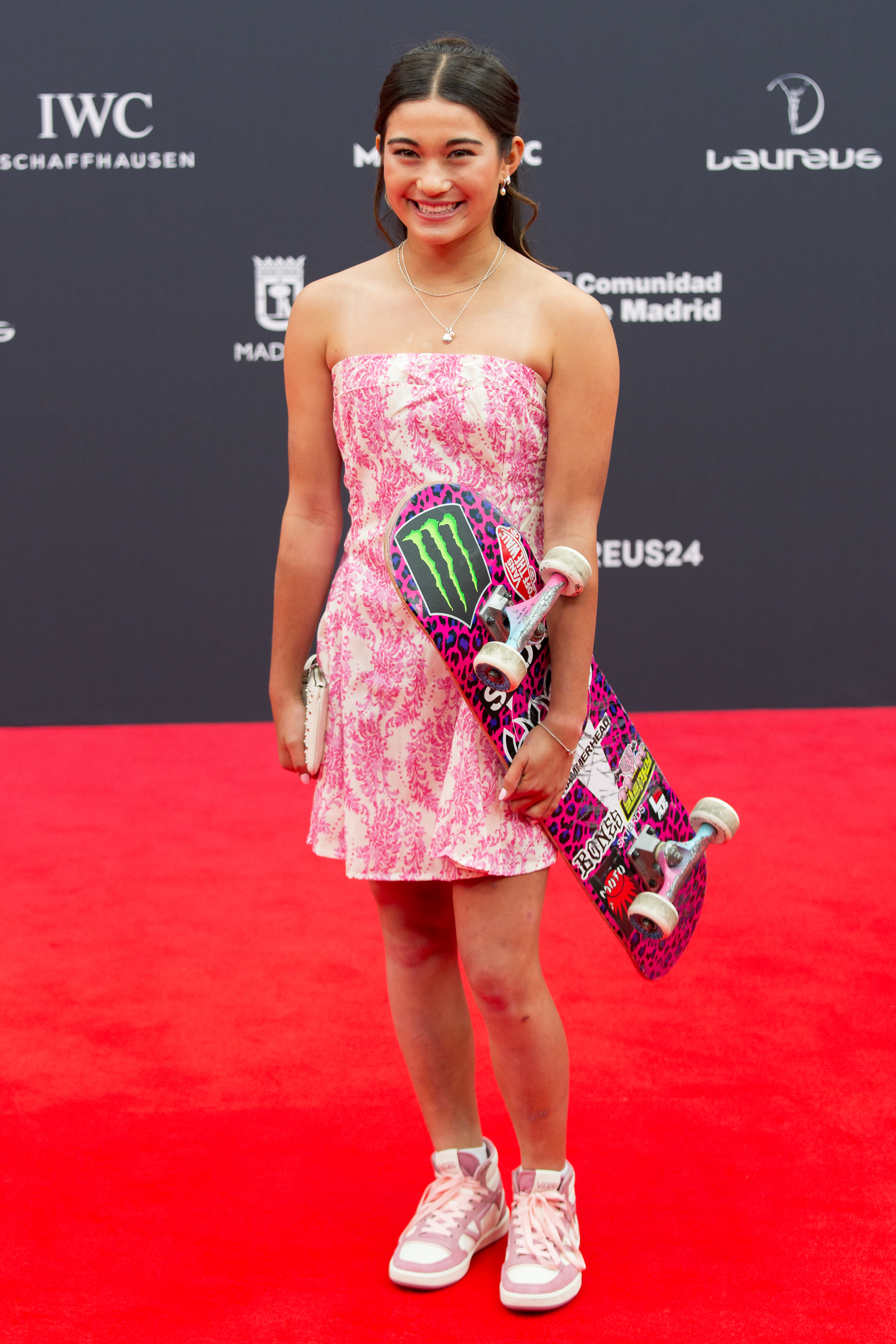
Arisa Trew is the first Australian female Olympic champion in skateboarding, winning the women's park in 2024. She is also Australia's youngest-ever Olympic gold medallist.

Skateboarding made its first appearance at the postponed 2020 Olympics, with Australia receiving five quota spots, two in the men's park, and one each in the women's park and both street events. It would also see the first Australian crowned Olympic champion in skateboarding, with Keegan Palmer winning the men's park. In 2024, Australia was given nine quota spots, five in the park and four in the street events. Australia swept the gold medal in both men's and women's park events, with Palmer winning back-to-back gold in the men's event and Arisa Trew in the women's, who subsequently became Australia's youngest-ever Olympic gold medallist. Trew also became the youngest Australian athlete to be selected for an Olympics since 1984.

Games	Gold	Silver	Bronze	Total	Ranking
Total	3	0	0	3	2

=== Tennis ===
Australia first competed in tennis at the inaugural 1896 Games, with one player competing in men's singles and, as part of a mixed team, in men's doubles. Edwin Flack lost in the first round of the singles, but paired with George S. Robertson to earn bronze in the doubles. The mixed team medal is not credited to Australia. The first tennis gold medal won by Australia was by the Woodies in men's doubles in 1996; the pair also won Australia's only silver medal in the sport four years later. In 2024, Matthew Ebden and John Peers won the men's doubles, providing Australia with its second gold medal in tennis.

Games	Gold	Silver	Bronze	Total	Ranking
Total	2	1	4	7 (Note: Does not include a bronze medal won in 1896 by a mixed team with an Australian player.)	10

== See also ==
- List of flag bearers for Australia at the Olympics
- Australia at the Winter Olympics
- Australia at the Commonwealth Games
- Australia at the Universiade
- Australia at the World Championships in Athletics
- Category:Olympic competitors for Australia
