= Bill Luders =

American naval architect

Alfred Edward "Bill" Luders, Jr. (December 31, 1909 – January 31, 1999) was an American naval architect, who designed all but one of the Sea Sprite Sailing Yachts.

== Early life ==
Born in Stamford, Connecticut, Luders attended The Hill School in Pottstown, Pennsylvania, then forwent further education to undertake an apprenticeship in naval architecture. Luders later became the director of the family business, Luders Marine Construction Company in Stamford, which was founded by his father, A.E. Luders, Sr., in 1908.

In 1946, Luders was one of a committee of five boat designers (including George Hinman, Arthur Knapp, Emil "Bus" Mosbacher and Cornelius Shields) who codified and regulated the International One Design class of yachts.

With the revival of the America's Cup yacht race with 12-meter yachts in 1958, Luders built the yacht Weatherly to a design by Philip Rhodes. Although the yacht was not selected that year, it successfully defended the Cup at the 1962 America's Cup against the Australian yacht Gretel.

== Designs ==
- Sea Sprite 27
- Sea Sprite 34
