= Weatherly (yacht) =

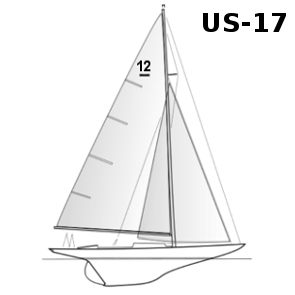
- Yacht club: New York Yacht Club
- Nation: United States
- Class: 12-metre
- Sail no: US–17
- Designer(s): Philip Rhodes
- Builder: Luders Marine Construction Company
- Launched: 1958
- Owner(s): Henry D. Mercer syndicate

Racing career
- Skippers: Emil "Bus" Mosbacher, Jr.
- Notable victories: 1962 America's Cup
- America's Cup: 1962

Specifications
- Displacement: 25.65 tons
- Length: 20.39 m (66.9 ft) (LOA); 13.86 m (45.5 ft) (LWL)
- Beam: 3.62 m (11.9 ft)
- Draft: 2.72 m (8 ft 11 in)
- Sail area: 165.6 m^{2} (1,783 sq ft)

Weatherly (US 17) is a 12-metre racing yacht that was an unsuccessful defense candidate for the 1958 America's Cup and victorious defender in the 1962 America's Cup.

== Design ==
Weatherly is a keel sloop designed to the 12-metre Rule. She was designed by Philip Rhodes and built by Luders Marine Construction Company at Stamford, Connecticut in 1958 for a syndicate of owners formed by New York Yacht Club members Henry D. Mercer, Cornelius S. Walsh and Arnold D. Frese. Her construction consists of African mahogany double planking on white oak frames. Framing is on 10" centers, with two minor steam bent frames between each laminated major frame. Ring frames, hanging knees, mast step, floor timbers, and all fasteners are of bronze.

== Career ==
Weatherly was skippered from 1958 through 1961 by Arthur Knapp, competing with Columbia, Easterner, and Vim for the right to defend the America's Cup, but was eliminated in the 1958 selection trials by Columbia, which went on to successfully defend that year.

She was modified by Bill Luders at Luders Marine for the 1962 cup, receiving a shortened stern, squared-off rudder and numerous small changes in order to reduce weight, which in turn was put into her keel to allow her to carry sail.

The defender selection trials pitted Weatherly against Columbia, Easterner and the newly designed and built Nefertiti. On 25 August 1962, the NYYC selected Weatherly to defend the Cup against Australian challenger Gretel. Skippered by Emil "Bus" Mosbacher, Jr., in September 1962, Weatherly defended the Cup 4–1 against Gretel.

Weatherly continued to be used as a trial horse in America's Cup competition through the 1970 season when she was, surprisingly given her age, invited to enter the defender's trials. Following that season, an engine was installed at the Derecktor Shipyards in Mamaroneck, NY. She then motored up the Hudson and through the Erie Canal to the Great Lakes and on to the Palmer Johnson Shipyard in Wisconsin, where she was modified for offshore racing both on deck and below. Weatherly had an active racing career on the Great Lakes and the SORC under the ownership of Doug Jones.

In the mid '70s, Weatherly was sold. She is now normally berthed dockside at the Newport Harbor Hotel and Marina in Rhode Island, and is available for chartering. She was listed on the National Register of Historic Places in 2012.

1958 and 1962 Specification Comparison
	1958	1962
LOA	21.03 m (69.0 ft)	20.39 m (66.9 ft)
LWL	13.86 m (45.5 ft)	
Beam	3.62 m (11.9 ft)	
Draft	2.72 m (8 ft 11 in)	
Sail Area	166 m^{2} (1,790 sq ft)	165.6 m^{2} (1,783 sq ft)
Displacement	26.5 tons	25.65 tons
Ballast	16.35 tons	18.4 tons
Mast Height	25 m (82 ft)	

== See also ==
- National Register of Historic Places listings in Newport County, Rhode Island
