= 1962 America's Cup =

18th America's Cup
Defender United States
- Defender club: New York Yacht Club
- Yacht: Weatherly

Challenger Australia
- Challenger club: Royal Sydney Yacht Squadron
- Yacht: Gretel

Competition
- Location: Newport, Rhode Island, United States
- Dates: September 1962
- Rule: 12-metre
- Winner: New York Yacht Club
- Score: 4–1

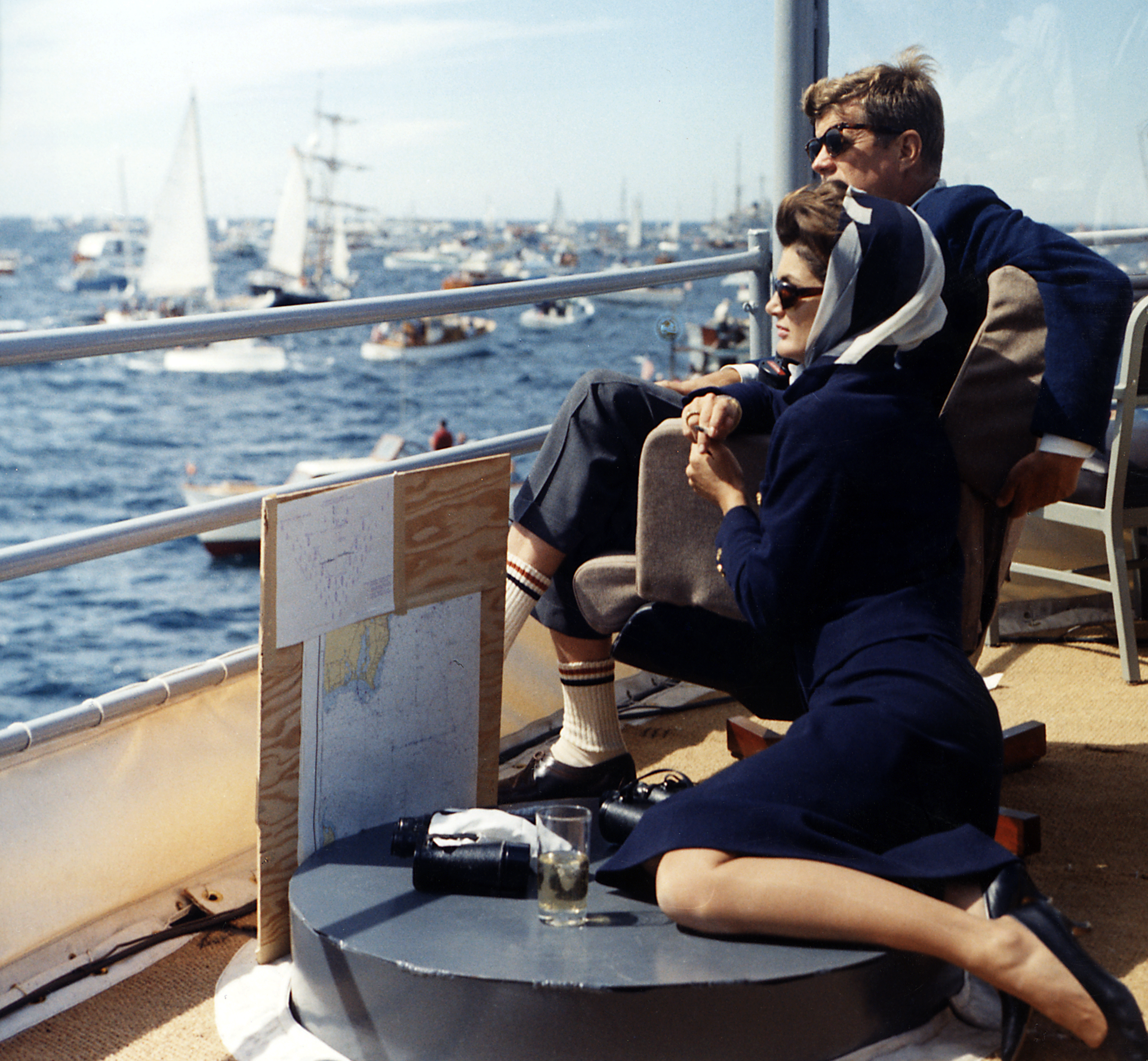
President and Mrs. Kennedy watching the races off Newport

The 1962 America's Cup, the second to be sailed in 12-metre yachts, marked the first challenge for the Cup from a country other than Great Britain or Canada, and was the first challenge from a country in the southern hemisphere. An Australian syndicate headed by Sir Frank Packer, representing the Royal Sydney Yacht Squadron, challenged with their yacht Gretel. Although the New York Yacht Club won the regatta four races to one represented by the yacht Weatherly, the challenger, Gretel won the second race, beating the Americans for the first time since the 1930s, and only lost the fourth race by twenty-six seconds. The NYYC was so shocked at the closeness of the contest that they immediately changed the rules to ban the use of American design and technology by Cup challengers.

== Defender Series ==
The NYYC ran a regatta to determine the yacht they would name as defender in the match. Competing were Weatherly, with Emil (Bus) Mosbacher Jr. at the helm, Easterner, Columbia, skippered by Paul V. Shields, and Nefertiti, helmed by sailmaker and naval architect Ted Hood. Weatherly was chosen as the defender.

== Weatherly ==
Weatherly (US-17) was designed by Philip Rhodes, built by Luders Marine Construction Company at Stamford, Connecticut, USA, and owned by a syndicate headed by Henry D. Mercer, Cornelius Walsh, and Arnold D. Frese. The boat was built for the trials for the 1958 America's Cup but had performed poorly. For the 1962 trials, Weatherly was extensively modified by shortening the bow, reducing the wetted surface area, reducing weight wherever possible and moving the weight saved to increase the weight of the keel.

== Gretel ==
Gretel (KA-1) was the first Australian 12-meter. She was designed by Alan Payne, built by Lars Halvorsen Sons, and owned by a syndicate headed by Frank Packer plus Richard Dickson, William H. Northam, William G. Walkley, and Noel Foley. She was helmed by Jock Sturrock.

== The races ==
Date	Course	Winner	Loser	Winning time	Delta	Score	Winner's velocity on course
September 15, 1962	24 nmi (44 km; 28 mi), windward leeward^{a}	Weatherly	Gretel	3:13:57	3:46	1-0	7.42
September 18, 1962	24 nmi, triangular^{b}	Gretel	Weatherly	2:47:45	0:57	1-1	8.58
September 20, 1962	24 nmi, windward leeward	Weatherly	Gretel	4:21:16	8:40	2-1	5.51
September 22, 1962	24 nmi, triangular	Weatherly	Gretel	3:22:28	0:26	3-1	7.11
September 24, 1962	24 nmi, windward leeward	Weatherly	Gretel	3:16:17	3:40	4-1	7.34

^a Each leg 6 nautical miles (11 km; 6.9 mi); twice around the course.

^b Each leg 8 nautical miles (15 km; 9.2 mi); first leg upwind.
