= Bill Northam =

Australian sailor and businessman

Medal record

Men's sailing

Representing Australia

Olympic Games
Gold medal – first place	1964 Tokyo	5.5 metre class

Sir William Herbert Northam, CBE (28 September 1905 – 2 September 1988) was an Australian Olympic yachtsman and businessman.

Born in Torquay, Devon on 28 September 1905, Northam had a successful career in business before becoming an Olympian. He was simultaneously chairman of the Australian branches of two major companies: American pharmaceutical company Johnson & Johnson, and British sports equipment brand Slazenger.

== Sailing career ==
Northam took up the sport of sailing late in life, at the age of 46, after taking the helm of a neighbour's boat near his waterfront home on Sydney's Northern Beaches, and comparing the feeling to that of car racing. He purchased a number of boats over the next few years: his first, Gymea, which ran into the starter's boat in her first race; the eight-metre yacht Saskia, with which he won the prestigious Sayonara Cup for the Royal Sydney Yacht Squadron in 1955 and 1956; and Caprice of Huon, which came 9th in the 1963 Sydney to Hobart Yacht Race. He was also a crew member on Gretel, Sir Frank Packer's challenger in the 1963 America's Cup.

== 1964 Olympic Games ==
In 1963, Northam set himself the challenge of competing in the Olympic Games. He travelled to the United States, where he arranged for naval architect Bill Luders Jr. to design and build him a yacht, which was named Barrenjoey after the Barrenjoey Head Lighthouse near Northam's Sydney home. With fellow Gretel yachtsmen Peter 'Pod' O'Donnell and James Sargeant, both more than 30 years younger than him, Northam took Barrenjoey to a successful run of the 1964 Australian titles, the Olympic trials and further challenge races, until the team qualified for the 1964 Summer Olympics in Tokyo, Japan, despite misgivings about Northam's age, now 59. Northam marched in the opening ceremony with his son Rod, who was a reserve member of the rowing team.

The Australian team competed in the 5.5 metre class, starting well with wins in the first, fourth and sixth races, although they were disqualified in the fifth. Northam's main rival, the yacht Bingo skippered by American author John J. McNamara won the second and third races, and McNamara would have taken the gold medal if Bingo won the final race and Barrenjoey finished fifth or worse. In a fierce race for first place against Swedish boat Rush VII, McNamara was disqualified, and Northam and his crew finished fourth, qualifying them for the gold medal. It was Australia's first Olympic gold for sailing, and Northam remains the oldest Australian to win an Olympic gold medal.

Northam was cremated and his ashes interred at Northern Suburbs Crematorium, Sydney.

== Honours ==
- 1965: Father of the Year
- 1 January 1966: Commander of the Order of the British Empire
- 31 December 1976: Knight Bachelor for services to the community
- 1978: AOC Olympic Merit
- 1985 - inaugural inductee Sport Australia Hall of Fame
- 2017 - inaugural inductee Australian Sailing Hall of Fame
