= Sceptre (yacht) =

America's cup challenger

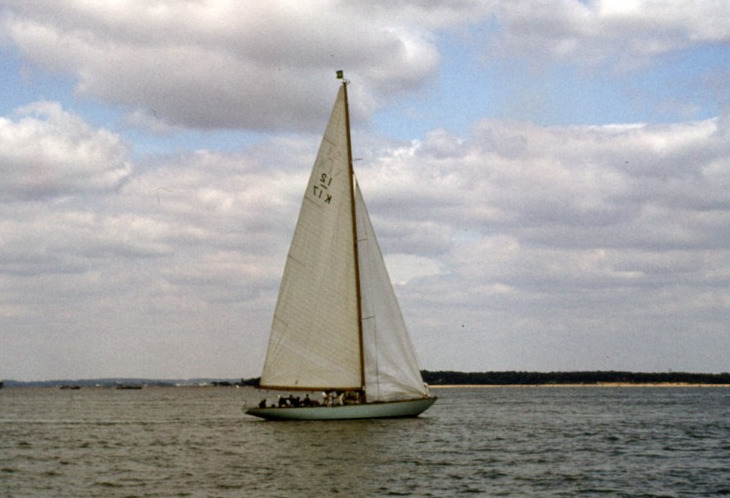
- Sceptre K-17 in the Solent viewed from Cowes, June 1963
- Yacht club: Royal Yacht Squadron
- Nation: United Kingdom
- Class: 12-metre
- Sail no: K–17
- Designer(s): David Boyd
- Builder: Alexander Robertson & Sons
- Owner(s): Hugh Goodson syndicate

Racing career
- Skippers: Graham Mann
- America's Cup: 1958

Specifications
- Type: Monohull

Sceptre (K-17) was the unsuccessful challenger of the 1958 America's Cup for the Royal Yacht Squadron.

== Design ==
Designed by David Boyd and built by Alexander Robertson & Sons, Sceptre was built especially for the 1958 America's Cup challenge.

== Career ==
Sceptre was owned by a syndicate headed by Hugh Goodson, plus Richard Dickson, William H. Northam, William G. Walkley, and Noel Foley. Sceptre lost 4–0 to defender Columbia of the New York Yacht Club. She is now owned and sailed in British waters by the Sceptre Preservation Society.
