= James Sargeant =

Australian sailor

Medal record

Sailing

Representing Australia

Olympic Games
Gold medal – first place	1964 Tokyo	5.5 metre

James Frederick Richard "Dick" Sargeant (born 17 March 1936 in Kobe, Japan) is an Australian sailor and Olympic Champion. He competed at the 1964 Summer Olympics in Tokyo and won a gold medal in the 5.5 metre class.

Prior to Tokyo, Sargeant had been a crewman on Gretel, the Australian challenger for the 1962 America's Cup. After Tokyo, he continued his involvement with the Australian and international sailing world during the ensuing decades.

Sargeant competed at Mexico City 1968 Olympics, where he and Carl Ryves sailed their Flying Dutchman class boat into fourth place, an agonising 0.7 points off a medal.

In 2017, he was an inaugural inductee Australian Sailing Hall of Fame with Bill Northam and Peter O'Donnell.

Sargeant was awarded the Medal of the Order of Australia in the 2026 King's Birthday Honours for service to sailing.
