= Columbia (1958 yacht) =

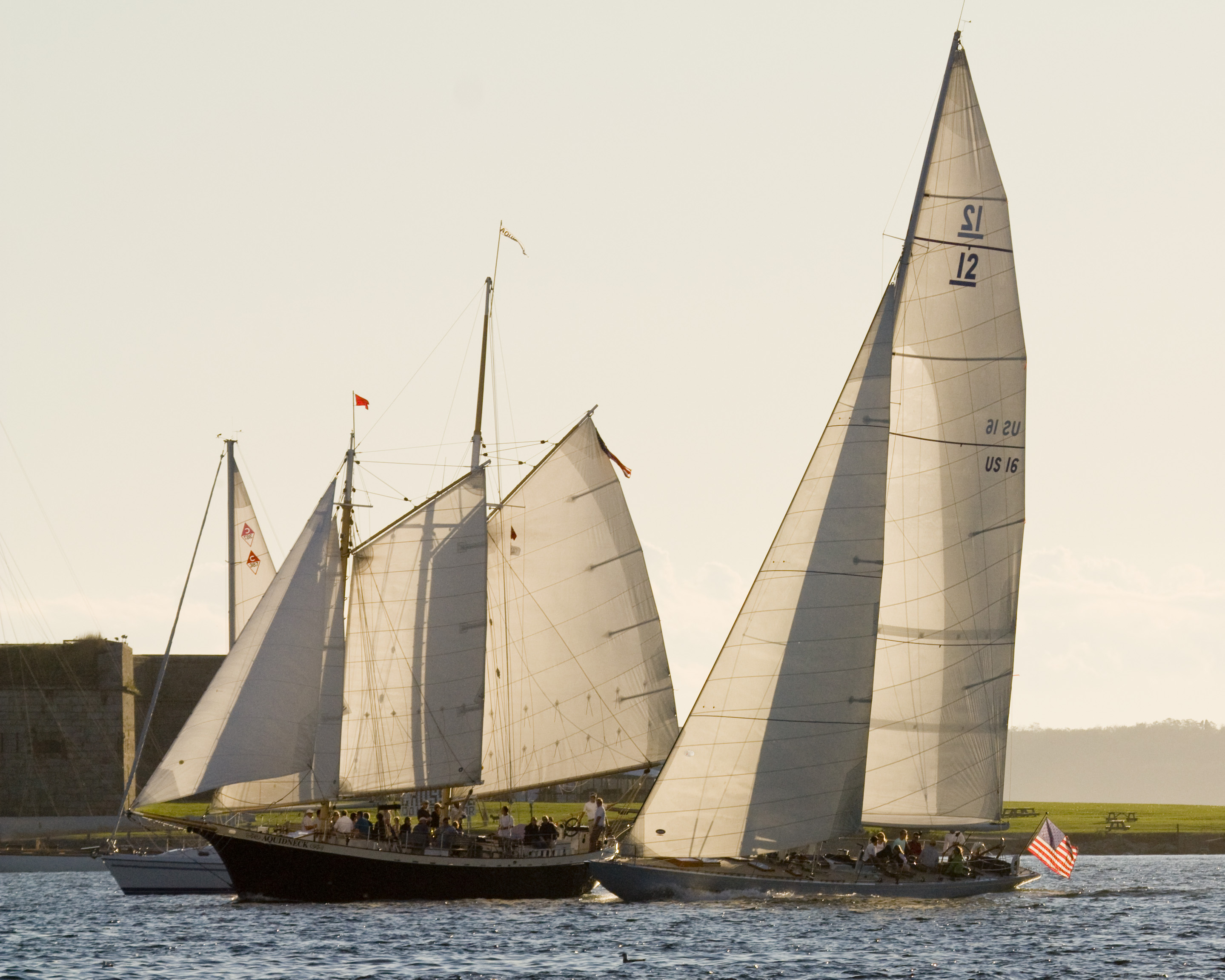
- Columbia (right) in 2011
- Yacht club: New York Yacht Club
- Nation: United States
- Class: 12-metre
- Sail no: US–16
- Designer(s): Olin Stephens
- Builder: Nevins, City Island, Bronx
- Owner(s): Henry Sears syndicate

Racing career
- Skippers: Briggs Cunningham
- Notable victories: 1958 America's Cup
- America's Cup: 1958

Specifications
- Type: Monohull

Columbia (US-16) was the successful defender of the 1958 America's Cup for the New York Yacht Club, besting the British challenger Sceptre. She has survived to the present day, and sails out of Newport with the distinction of being the earliest surviving America’s Cup winner.

== Career ==
Columbia was designed by Olin Stephens and built by Nevins. Built to compete for the right to defend the '58 America's Cup, she was owned by a syndicate headed by New York Yacht Club members Henry Sears, Gerard B. Lambert, Briggs Cunningham, Vincent Astor, James A. Farrell, A. Howard Fuller, and William T. Moore.

Columbia was helmed by Cunningham, the inventor of the cunningham downhaul, with syndicate head Sears as navigator. After defeating Sceptre in the Cup challenge, she went on to a long career competing in the Defender trials for the 1962, 1964, and 1967 America's Cup competitions.
