= 1958 America's Cup =

Yacht race

17th America's Cup
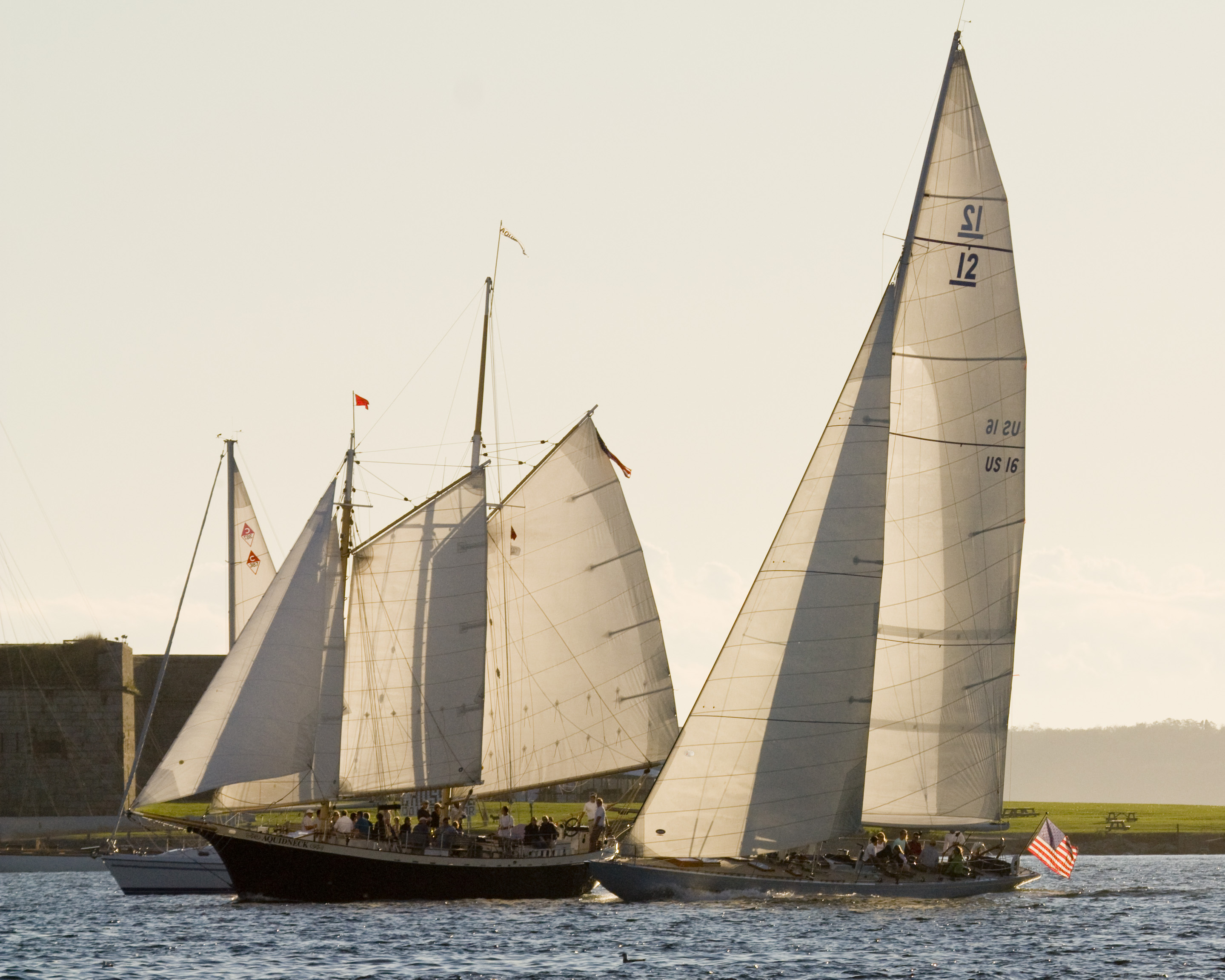
- Columbia (right) in 2011

Defender United States
- Defender club: New York Yacht Club
- Yacht: Columbia

Challenger United Kingdom
- Challenger club: Royal Yacht Squadron
- Yacht: Sceptre

Competition
- Location: Newport, Rhode Island, United States
- Dates: 20–26 September 1958
- Rule: 12-metre
- Winner: New York Yacht Club
- Score: 4–0

The 1958 America's Cup marked the first Cup match sailed in 12-metre class yachts. Twenty years had passed since the last Cup match, held between immense Universal Rule J-class yachts in 1937 besides World War II, and the New York Yacht Club sought a more affordable alternative to restart interest in the Cup. In 1956 Henry Sears led an effort advancing class yachts. The Royal Yacht Squadron of Great Britain agreed to challenge with a new 12-metre, Sceptre. The New York Yacht Club defended with theirs, Columbia, winning the Cup in a four-race sweep.

== Defender Series ==
Four yachts competed in a summer long regatta to determine which the NYYC would name as defender, Columbia (US-16), a new Olin Stephens boat, Weatherly (US-17), Easterner (US-18), and the Olin Stephens designed Vim (US-15) from 1939. Columbia was chosen after a very close set of races resulted in only beating the 19-year-old Vim by 12 seconds in the final competition.

== The Races ==
Date	Course	Winner	Loser	Winning Time	Delta	Score	Winner's Velocity on Course
September 20, 1958	24 nmi (44 km; 28 mi), windward leeward^{a}	Columbia	Sceptre	5:13:56	7:45	1-0	4.59
September 24, 1958	24 nmi (44 km; 28 mi), triangular^{b}	Columbia	Sceptre	3:17:42	11:42	2-0	7.28
September 25, 1958	24 nmi, windward leeward	Columbia	Sceptre	3:09:07	8:20	3-0	7.61
September 26, 1958	24 nmi, triangular	Columbia	Sceptre	3:04:22	7:05	4-0	7.81

^a Each leg 6 nautical miles (11 km; 6.9 mi); twice around the course

^b Each leg 8 nautical miles (15 km; 9.2 mi); first leg upwind.
