= Peter O'Donnell (sailor) =

Australian sailor

- Born: 28 February 1939
- Died: 9 January 2008 (aged 68); Hallidays Point, New South Wales, Australia
- Family: Jack O'Donnell (rugby union), Iggy O'Donnell
- Awards: Inductee Australian Sailing Hall of Fame

Peter O'Donnell
Medal record

Representing Australia

Men's sailing

Olympic Games
Gold medal – first place	1964 Tokyo	5.5 metre

Peter Joseph O'Donnell (28 February 1939 – 9 January 2008) was an Australian sailor and Olympic champion. He competed at the 1964 Summer Olympics in Tokyo and won a gold medal in the 5.5 metre class, with the boat Barrenjoey and team members Bill Northam and James Sargeant.

In 2017, he was an inaugural inductee to the Australia Sailing Hall of Fame with Northam and Sargeant.
