= Jock Sturrock =

Australian yachtsman (1915–1997)

Medal record

Sailing

Representing Australia

Olympic Games
Bronze medal – third place	1956 Melbourne	5.5 metre class

Alexander Stuart "Jock" Sturrock MBE (14 May 1915 in Melbourne – 11 July 1997 in Noosa Heads) was a noted Australian yachtsman who won over four hundred international, national, state and club championship yachting races.

== Sports career ==
Between 1929 and 1959 Jock won 21 Australian and 22 Victorian yachting championships.

He won his first Victorian championship, in the 12 ft Cadet Dinghy "Aurcol", in 1929 when he was 14 years old.

The first Australian yachting championship he won, in the 12-foot Cadet Dinghy "Monsoon", was in Perth in 1932 when he was 16 years old. At 18 he helped pioneer the introduction of the International Star class yacht into Australia and then won the first 8 Australian championships held for that Star class (between 1935 and 1947). He was also 6-time Australian 6 Metre class champion (1946, 1947, 1953, 1954, 1955 and 1956), 4-time Australian Dragon class champion (1951–52, 1952–53, 1953–54, and 1954–55), and 2-time Australian 5.5 Metre class champion (1956 and 1959).

As an athlete, he represented Australia in four Olympic Games, 1948 London (Star class), 1952 Helsinki (Dragon class), 1956 Melbourne (Bronze Medal, 5.5 Metre class), and 1960 Rome (5.5 Metre class). He was also manager of the Australian Yachting Team for the London and Helsinki Games. At the Rome Olympic Games he became the first athlete to have represented Australia in four Olympic games, and in recognition of that fact was given the honour of being the Australian flag-bearer for the opening ceremony.

Jock first international foray in yachting occurred in 1937, when he was invited to compete in two regattas held by the Royal Yacht Squadron (UK), one at Torbay and the other the Coronation Regatta held at Cowes. At the later he won the Coronation Cup for International 14 ft Dinghies in a boat owned by Sir Fitzroy Anstruther-Gough-Calthorpe. He also finished in third place in the 1948 World Star Championship held after the London Olympics at Cascais in Portugal, came third in the 1959 European Dragon Championship at Trieste in Italy, and second the 1959 German Dragon Championships at Lake Königssee in Germany.

He achieved international public recognition when he skippered Australia's first challenge for the America's Cup in Gretel in 1962. Although defeated 4 to 1 by Weatherly, Gretel's victory in the second race was the first by a challenger since 1934, and is widely recognised as the first of the events that resurrected the America's Cup as an international sporting competition. He also skippered Dame Pattie, Australia's second America's Cup challenger, in 1967, which was beaten 4–0 by the highly controversial defender Intrepid.

He also represented Australia multiple times as an ocean racing skipper in the Admiral's Cup (England) and the Clipper Cup (Hawaii), managed two successful Australian campaigns for the International Catamaran Challenge Trophy (the 'Little America's Cup'), and sailed in the Sydney to Hobart Yacht Race 11 times.

Between 1972 and 1980 he was a member of the Olympic Fund Raising Committee.

Jock Sturrock was recognised as the 1962 Australian of the Year, the 1962 Australian Yachtsman of the Year, and the 1962 Australian Sportsperson of the Year (the Lindy Trophy). In 1975 he was appointed a Member of the Order of the British Empire (MBE) for services to yachting. In 1985 he was inducted into the Sport Australia Hall of Fame as an 'Athlete Member', and in 1994 was elevated to a 'Legend of Australian Sports'.

In June 2018 Jock was posthumously recognised by The Australian Sailing Team's Alumni Program as the first sailor to represent Australia in an Olympic class boat at an Olympic Games or World Championships and achieve a top 10 performance, by the awarding of the No.1 Barranjoey Medal. In October 2018 he was inducted into the Australian Sailing Hall of Fame.

== Military service ==
Jock served in the 46th Battalion of the Australian Army from 1940 to 1945, rising in rank from private to captain within his first two years.

In February 1942 he was seconded as a liaison officer to HQ 3rd Division 2AIF, and subsequently trained for long-range specialist reconnaissance, intelligence gathering and sabotage behind enemy lines. In December 1943 was appointed adjutant to LHQ Tactical School (Jungle Warfare) on Rainy Mountain near Kuranda in Queensland.

During 1943 and 1944 he saw active service in Papua New Guinea on three separate occasions, serving as an intelligence officer with both HQ New Guinea Force and HQ 3rd Division 2AIF during the war against the Japanese 51st Division at the Battle of Wau and the Salamaua–Lae campaign. His duty was the gathering of intelligence from outlying spotter posts behind enemy lines, and carrying orders and intelligence back and forth along the Black Cat Track and the Buisaval Track between front-line troops and HQ. It also included a 6-week period in July/August 1943 when he was promoted in the field to Major and traversed the Bitoi River Track with a native carrier to act as Senior Liaison Officer with the United States Army's 41st Division 162nd Regiment at Nassau Bay.

As the direct result of his army service, Jock was hospitalised on five occasions: once for a broken ankle during training in Queensland, and in PNG twice for Dengue Fever, once for a concussion received when a US reconnaissance plane he was in crashed in the jungle between Nassau Bay and Wau, and finally for a broken leg received when a suspension bridge over the Bitoi River collapsed during a night-time crossing. This last event lead to him being invalided out of active service and returning to Melbourne, and affected his mobility for the rest of his life.

== Other tributes ==
Tributes to Jock include streets named after him: 'Sturrock Place' in the Canberra suburb of Gordon, and 3 'Sturrock Courts' in the Melbourne suburbs of Berwick, Mill Park and Altona Meadows; and the 'Jock Sturrock Bridge' in Noosaville, Queensland.
