= Henry Sears =

American yacht racer (1913–1982)

- Born: 1913
- Died: March 1982 (aged 68–69); Chestertown, Maryland, US
- Resting place: Chestertown, Maryland, US
- Spouse: Mary Pouch Sears
- Children: 1
- Parent: Henry Francis Sears (father)

Henry Sears (1913 – March 1982) was an American commander and a commodore of the New York Yacht Club who competed in the America's Cup and discovered multiple species of marine fish.

== Early life ==
Sears began sailing at the age of eight. As a child, his family spent three months of the year in each of Boston, Massachusetts; Paris, France; Beverly, Massachusetts; and Bryn Mawr, Pennsylvania. He attended Ecole Gory School from 1920 to 1925 and St. Mark's School from 1928 to 1930. It is unknown whether Sears later attended Yale or the Brooks School.

=== The Atlantis ===
At the Woods Hole Oceanographic Institution, Sears worked on the ship Atlantis, where he measured the temperatures and salinity off the waters of Maine. While on the ship, he recorded and preserved several unknown fish species, in genus Searsia of family Platytroctidae: Searsia koefoedi and Searsia polycoeca. Sears' preserved specimens are now located at the Peabody Museum.

== The Sears Foundation ==
Sears' wealthy uncle David Sears IV left him a significant inheritance. He used US$85,000 to start the Sears Foundation, which published the first Journal of Marine Research and the book Fishes of the Western North America.

== World War II ==
With the beginning of World War II, Sears entered the program for training officers for the U.S. Naval Reserve. He served as captain of the USS Wesson (DE-184) and as commanding officer for the USS Pillsbury (DE-133). At the end of the war, he was discharged and received multiple medals, including the Bronze Star.

== Sailing ==
Sears won the Navy Challenge Cup in 1952 and the Alumni Class Cup in 1953. In 1956, he was elected commodore of the New York Yacht Club.

=== The America's Cup ===
In 1956, after a 19-year hiatus in America's Cup Racing, Sears appealed to the Supreme Court of New York to amend the Cup's deed of gift. Sears' appeal reinstated the competition in smaller 12-meter yachts. He then went on to serve as the navigator of the 1958 (defender) Columbia, which won the competition.
