= Gretel (yacht) =

America's Cup yacht

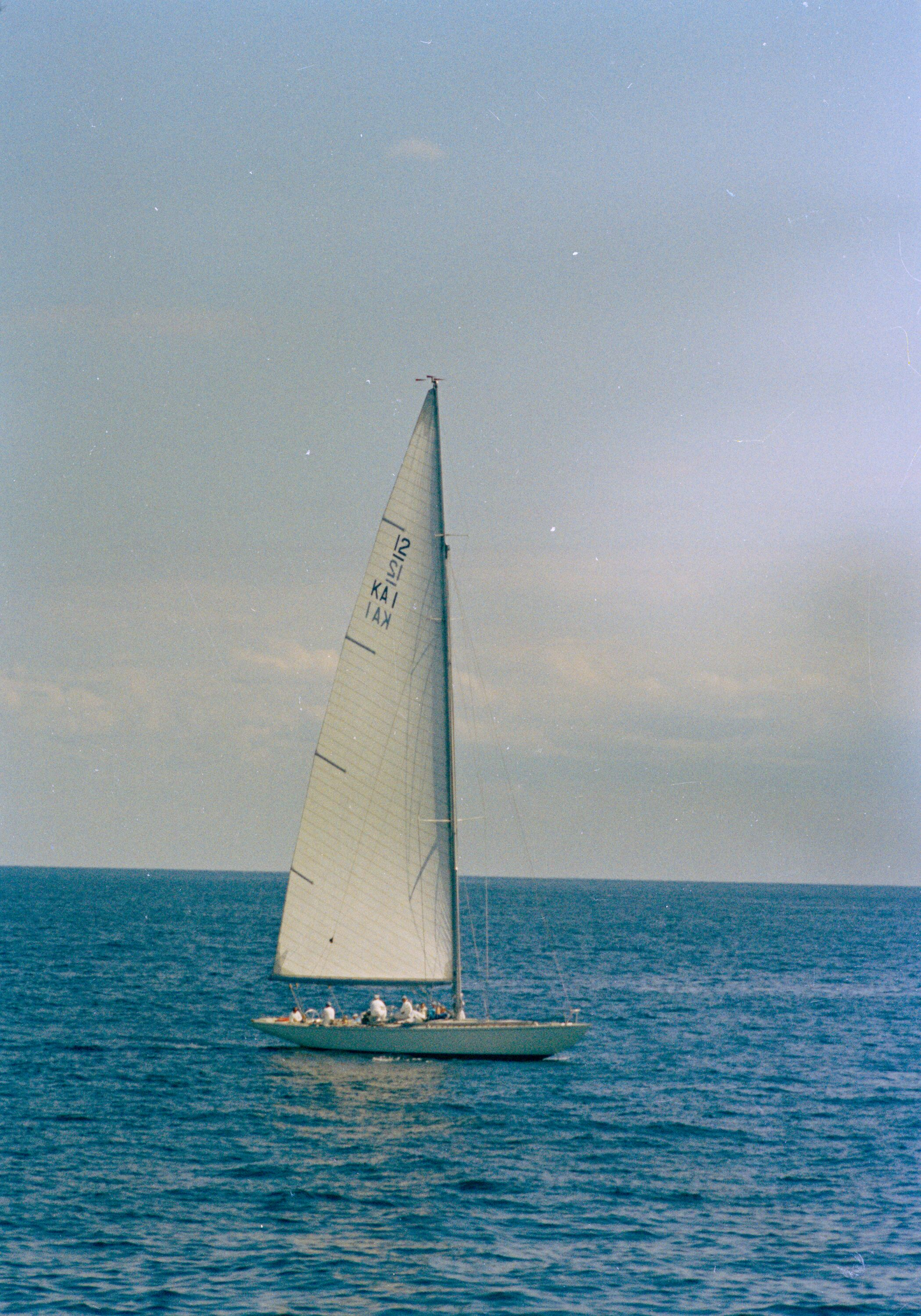
- Gretel during the 1962 America's Cup
- Yacht club: Royal Sydney Yacht Squadron
- Nation: Australia
- Class: 12 Metre
- Sail no: KA-1
- Designer(s): Alan Payne
- Builder: Lars Halvorsen Sons
- Launched: 19 February 1962
- Owner(s): Frank Packer

Racing career
- Skippers: Jock Sturrock
- America's Cup: 1962

Specifications
- Displacement: 26.7 tons
- Length: 21.16 metres
- Beam: 3.58 metres
- Draft: 2.67 metres
- Sail area: 166.9 square metres

Gretel is a 12 Metre yacht that unsuccessfully challenged for the 1962 America's Cup.

== History ==
Gretel was ordered by Frank Packer to challenge for the 1962 America's Cup. Designed by Alan Payne, it was built by Lars Halvorsen Sons, Sydney, being launched on 19 February 1962 and christened nine days later at the Royal Sydney Yacht Squadron by Pattie Menzies. It was defeated 1-4 by Weatherly in the America's Cup. It returned to Australia in December 1962.

After serving as a trial horse to Dame Pattie and Gretel II in the leadup to the 1967 and 1970 America's Cup, it was sold to Alan Bond as a trial horse for Southern Cross in the leadup to the 1974 America's Cup. In 1975 it was sold to former skipper Jock Sturrock who sailed it in the 1975 Sydney to Hobart Yacht Race. In 1977 ir was sold to Sydney property developer Bernard Lewis, who skiped it to a second placed finish on handicap in the 1980 Sydney to Hobart.

In 1982 it was sold and moved to the Whitsunday Islands as a charter vessel. It was sold in 2002 and shipped to Italy. In 2011 it was sold to Robbe & Berking, Flensburg, Germany, where as at June 2025, it remained awaiting restoration.
