= JJ Giltinan International Trophy =

18-foot skiff open championship

The JJ Giltinan International Trophy is considered the world's premier 18ft Skiff open championship, the eponymous brainchild of noted Australian sports entrepreneur J. J. Giltinan.

== Early days – 1930s and 1940s ==
In the early 20th century 18-foot skiff racing had gained ground as a spectator sport. The radical innovations introduced by Aberdare in 1933 (a narrow beam, reduced sail area, reduced crew, and flat bottom) made it significantly faster than contemporary designs, leading Aberdare to win four consecutive Australian championships. The Sydney Flying Squadron, at that time the leading organizer of 18-foot skiff racing, promptly banned Aberdare's innovations, fearing the impact of these innovations on the established class.

The desire to race these faster skiffs using Aberdare's innovations led J. J. Giltinan to found the New South Wales 18-Footers League in 1935 as a rival club to the Flying Squadron. With the success of the new league Giltinan planned a world championship event for 18-foot skiffs on Sydney Harbour to coincide with Sydney's 150th anniversary in 1938. The inaugural edition of the eponymously named contest was held in Sydney Harbor in 1938, won by Taree skippered by Bert Swinbourne (AUS), while Aberdare took third.

Advertisements were placed in major newspapers throughout the world with positive replies being received from England, the US, Hong Kong and New Zealand. Unfortunately, due to unsettled conditions in Europe at the time, only the New Zealanders were able to compete, sending three boats to the inaugural regatta in 1938, which produced a total fleet of 20 boats.

The carnival was a great success. A local newspaper reported on the day following the first race: "The crowd at Circular Quay (ferry wharf) was so large that extra steamer accommodation had to be provided at the last moment, while craft of almost every conceivable description were in attendance. The foreshores were also thronged with spectators." The total crowd was estimated at more than 10,000 people.

Bert Swinbourne's Taree took the first championship with two wins and one second placing from the three-race regatta. Australia filled all three placings with Victor (Vic Lucas) in second place and Aberdare (Vic Vaughan) third while New Zealand's best performer was Irina, which finished in fifth place.

The success of the 1938 regatta led to a second championship being staged at Auckland in 1939 when three Australian 18 footers took on the Kiwi fleet of 21 boats. Unlike the original, this contest proved to be one of the most bitterly contested in the history of the championship. While the crowds on the foreshore were estimated at 25,000 people, it was marred by several protests, the latter of which saw the defending champion and provisional 1939 winner, Taree, being disqualified. Gordon Chamberlain's Manu was then declared the winner.

Taree's skipper Bert Swinbourne lodged an appeal against the decision, but when the appeal wasn't heard before the Australian team returned home, Swinbourne decided to hang on to the trophy. The Australian Board of Control later upheld the New Zealand decision in the best interests of keeping good will, but Swinbourne didn't agree and refused to hand over the trophy. He was expelled by the Australian League and for the next four years the Giltinan trophy remained hidden in Swinbourne's possession.

Swinbourne later apologized for his actions and returned the trophy to the League. It was then handed over to New Zealand and presented to the Manu owners.

A third contest took place at Auckland in 1948. Due to the bad feelings which had resulted from the 1939 regatta, the League was determined to send the strongest team possible and recruited the great Billo Hayward to sail its top boat Crows Nest.

This regatta was a triumph for the Australians as the huge sail carriers totally dominated the smaller New Zealand 18s to finish first, second and fourth overall. Hayward took the title with two wins and a fifth placing from the three races.

Drama and conflict seemed to be a fact of life in the history of the 18 footer class and the late 1940s were no exception. Queensland was suffering from rising costs and went to 6 ft beam boats with a further reduced number of crewmen; the League sailors refused to agree to the change and wouldn't allow the new boats to be registered in their events.

The New Zealand governing body of the time tried to incorporate these new boats into the Giltinan Championship, a move which angered the League and resulted in the New Zealand body withdrawing its support of the championship. Several New Zealand sailors contacted the League, offering to take a private team of 18 footers to the 1949 championship in Sydney. The League agreed and even assisted the kiwis with their shipping costs.

The kiwis put up a good showing with their top boat Takiri finishing third overall behind Marjorie Too (Tony Russell) and Top Weight (Bish Bolton) of Australia. New Zealand's Jack Logan believed he would never beat the Australians in his boat, so began to browse through old plans of his late father, who was a master designer and builder. On a piece of 50-year-old parchment paper he saw a design which gave him an idea. He drew it out, chopped off the bow and gave her a transom in place of a pointed stern. The public called her a skimmer; Logan called her a frying pan, complete with handle.

=== 1950s and 1960s ===
Logan rigged her with the latest Bermudan rig, polished her hull to a mirror-finish and christened her Komutu, the Maori word for "surprise". When the Australians went to Auckland in 1950 they were unable to match the phenomenal speed of this most unusual boat and were convincingly defeated in the three race championship. The 1950 contest was significant for the introduction of a third competing country when Fiji was represented by O'vuka, skippered by Alex Bentley.

After Australia's Bill Barnett totally dominated the 1951 series in Myra Too, the 1952 contest was hosted for the first time at a venue other than Australia and New Zealand - the Royal Suva Yacht Club in Fiji. After a closely fought series Peter Mander's Intrigue won the title back for New Zealand. This contest was also memorable for the fact that Intrigue's crew introduced the use of trapeze.

Peter Mander then became the first skipper to win two Giltinan Championships when he again skippered Intrigue to victory in the 1954 regatta at Auckland. New Zealand's domination resulted from the team's use of new cold-moulded hulls with two and three skins of diagonally laid planking and the fact that they carried three of the five crew on the trapeze wire.

New Zealand designers and sailors were becoming great innovators in the class during the 1950s. Not surprisingly, these moves immediately changed the style of 18 footers in Australia. It was back to Australia (Waterloo Bay, Brisbane) for the 1956 series and for the first time the regatta was sailed over five races and included the use of a discard. Queensland's Norm Wright used local knowledge to his advantage to win with Jenny VI.

Once again locals dominated the championship when the 1958 regatta was sailed on Sydney Harbour. Len Heffernan (Jantzen Girl) and Bill Barnett (SMV) dominated the racing as each skipper scored two wins in the five-race regatta. Only another local, Cliff Monkhouse (Toogara), was able to record a race win.

In the end the overall result was determined by an error from Barnett in the first race. SMV was leading by two minutes when Barnett failed to round the correct mark, allowing Heffernan through to take the win and title in Jantzen Girl.

Although only six boats contested the 1960 contest at Auckland the regatta was anything but uninteresting. As one leading New Zealand yachting journal said: "The 18s are still the glamour boats with the general public. Even the weekday races saw the waterfront road and headlands thick with spectators and the starting wharf completely packed".

There were great dramas even before the racing began when Bob Miller (later famously known as Ben Lexcen) arrived with his radically designed Taipan, which was the biggest break in tradition since the skimmer. She was a three-man boat, hard chine, plywood construction, reverse sheer, half-decked, heavily flared topsides and narrow (4 ft 3in) beam on the chine. She also had a smaller rig (similar to a Flying Dutchman), a big genoa and bending spars and was referred to by Miller as a supercharged FD.

Taipan had, however, far too much decking for the time and Miller was forced to do a major reconstruction job prior to the start of the regatta, reducing her deck by around fifty per cent, which made her very vulnerable in choppy conditions.

Bernie Skinner's Surprise won the title back for the kiwis with five good placings while the Australians couldn't match this consistency and suffered the consequences. Unfortunately for the New Zealanders, Skinner's victory was their only one during the 1960s.

Despite the problems experienced by Miller at Auckland, there was little doubt about Taipan's design, and the follow-up Venom proved this emphatically by dominating the 1961 contest on the Brisbane River.

At the 1963 contest in Auckland, the 1958 champion Len Heffernan played an unusual role when he was responsible for the design and construction of Ken Beashel's winning skiff, Schemer. Heffernan had built two skiffs for the Australian season and elected to sail the Taipan-Venom type boat while handing over the more conventional four-man boat to Beashel.

Beashel and his crew recorded three wins and a second placing over the five races; their record could have been even greater but for an unfortunate incident in race three when she was hit by a Royal New Zealand Air Force launch, which was carrying a TV cameraman.

In the 1964 contest on Sydney Harbour, the overall consistency of Toogara proved the winning formula for Cliff Monkhouse and his crew.

In the 1965 regatta at Auckland, Australian skipper Bob Holmes won the championship in Travelodge, which was the same boat Ken Beashel had sailed as Schemer to win the 1963 title - also at Auckland.

Holmes successfully defended his title with Travelodge in 1966 (to become the first Australian two-time winner), but his attempt to win a third consecutive championship was thwarted in 1967 at Sydney when Don Barnett narrowly and dramatically took the championship in Associated Motor Club. Barnett and team's consistency and good seamanship in very testing conditions won a hard-fought regatta against Holmes and Len Heffernan.

Auckland was the venue in 1968 and again three Australian boats dominated this series. There was, apparently, little harmony in the Australian team, as two protests were lodged against fellow team members.

Bob Holmes' Travelodge won each of the first two races only to be disqualified from the second following a protest by Ken Beashel in Daily Telegraph for a breach by Holmes against another Australian boat. Daily Telegraph then won races three and four, but had to survive a protest by Holmes in race three, before Beashel could regain the title he first won in 1963.

The 1969 series on the Brisbane River produced the championship's first tie which required a sail-off between two Australian boats Travelodge (Bob Holmes) and Rod Zemanek's Willie B. Again. A protest had a major effect on the overall result when Willie B. was disqualified for a breach of the port and starboard rule against Guinness Lady, after winning race three.

The special match race sail-off between Travelodge and Willie B. was a gripping race as the two skiffs were separated by just a few seconds around the entire course and the lead changed many times. Travelodge finally took line honours by just 26s which gave Holmes his third Giltinan title – the only skipper to do that at the time.

Bruce Farr skippered Guinness Lady into third place behind Holmes and Zemanek but was certainly unlucky not to be an even stronger challenger. Gear failures in each of the first two races robbed the young skipper who recorded two wins and a second placing in the final three races.

=== International competition starts to rise - 1970s ===
International competition took a major step forward in 1970 when a US entry competed in the Giltinan Championship for the first time. Roger Welsh skippered the 1969 champion Travelodge skiff as Travelodge International and sailed consistently to finish fourth overall behind three Australian boats. Hugh Treharne, skippering Thomas Cameron, scored four wins and a second placing for a well deserved win.

Bob Holmes and his Travelodge team returned to their consistent best to take out title number four at Auckland in 1971 but the writing was on the wall that the Bruce Farr design was starting to become a real force in 18 ft skiff racing and New Zealand were about to make a comeback.

Roger Welsh again showed the US flag and became the first American to win a race at the Giltinan when he brought Travelodge International home a seven minutes winner over Willie B in the atrocious conditions of race 4.

The predicted Farr design breakthrough finally came in 1972 when Don Lidgard's Smirnoff totally dominated the 1972 series on Waterloo Bay at Brisbane. Smirnoff scored easy wins in each of the first four races when Lidgard and his crew successfully used the tactic of tacking downwind to make the skiff almost unbeatable off a wind.

Their only defeat came in the final race when they were recalled at the start. They managed to get back into the lead but capsized then recovered once more to finish an incredible second - only 16s behind Denis Lehany's Nick & Kirby, which took second overall.

The US team was so impressed with Farr's design it commissioned him to design and build a new hull, then make a complete set of sails for the new skiff in New Zealand. On completion they had it shipped to the US, gained a partial sponsorship from the Travelodge organization, then took it to Sydney for the 1973 regatta, where Roger Welsh skippered it as Travelodge International.

In complete contrast to the previous series, the 1973 regatta in Sydney was so wide open that it wasn't decided until the spinnaker run home in the final race. Bob Holmes took his fifth Giltinan Championship when Travelodge narrowly defeated Dave Porter's KB and Smirnoff.

Welsh finished fourth in Travelodge International but could have been a challenger for overall victory with one race win and two second placings. Unfortunately, the skiff had gear failures in two races which led to retirements.

KB took race one by just 2s from Travelodge International, then moderate results in the following two races kept KB near the lead. Unfortunately for Porter the final two races were costly and once again it was the Holmes team's consistency which won the day to secure title number five.

New Zealand came back strongly at Auckland in 1974 when Terry McDell's Travelodge New Zealand dominated the series with four wins from the five races. Unfortunately for the kiwis it was their last Giltinan Championship victory to date.

Travelodge New Zealand's wins were dramatic as she totally dominated the strong fleet with winning margins from 1m 45s to 5m 2s. The crew conceded starts to their rivals in most heats but were so much faster they soon worked their way to the lead with precision sailing.

Dave Porter (KB) was the only Australian to threaten the New Zealand contingent, finishing second overall with a last race win and three second-place results, but never had any chance of beating Travelodge New Zealand.

An unfortunate sidelight to this contest was the news that Roger Welsh, who had shown such ability during previous challenges, was suffering from an incurable disease and was near death as this regatta was being sailed.

After being runner-up in the previous two Giltinan Championship contests, Dave Porter finally won the title when he successfully steered KB to victory in the 1975 series on the Brisbane River.

The sail, handling by Porter and his crew, particularly on the long tacking downwind runs, was the winning factor.

A capsize in race one saw KB finish only seventh but from that point there was never a doubt about her victory as she recorded four consecutive race wins for a perfect score - after discarding the race one result.

This 1975 regatta is also remembered as the first to attract an entry from the UK when British pioneer Alf Reynolds skippered a chartered skiff. There was a real family influence about the 1976 winner Miles Furniture. Stephen Kulmar was the skipper, his brother Paul Kulmar and brother-in-law Paul Ziems were the crew, and father Les Kulmar was involved (with the others) in the skiff's design and construction.

The Sydney Harbour regatta was sailed in light winds on most race days. Defending champion Dave Porter started impressively in KB with a 2m win over Miles Furniture in race one.

Though not noted for her ability in very light winds, Miles Furniture fought back with two wins in the next three races and went into the final race needing to finish no worse than one placing behind KB to take the championship.

A big crowd was attracted to the harbour for this final race and they weren't disappointed. Miles Furniture and KB had a great battle throughout but it was ultimately David Griffiths' Ansett Airlines which narrowly took race honours ahead of Miles Furniture. For the third time, Dave Porter had to be content with being runner up in the Giltinan.

The Giltinan Championship was continuing to gain more international appeal as another nation was represented for the first time in this regatta when French designer-builder Eric Lerouge skippered a locally chartered skiff.

=== Iain Murray era - 1977 to 1982 ===
The next six years of Giltinan Championship racing became known as the "Iain Murray era." Not only was he unbeatable, winning six consecutive championships from 1977 to 1982 (inclusive), but his design and technological innovations were also responsible for some of the most significant changes in the class's history.

After a moderate start to his first season in 1976–1977, Murray decided to modify the hull of his Color 7 skiff. The original design had flared sides and was nearly ten feet wide at the beam. Murray cut the sides and bow and changed the shape before shipping her off to New Zealand where he won the 1977 Giltinan Championship with an incredible final race win.

The contest was wide open throughout with no boat ever really having an edge. The first four races produced four different winners - KB and Color 7 went into the final race locked on points. A 20-knot northerly wind and big seas prevailed and all boats elected to carry their small rigs as the long course was going to be a real test and a battle for survival.

Defending champion Stephen Kulmar was recalled at the start in Miles Furniture (although he didn't know it at the time) and failed to return. His crew sailed brilliantly to cross the finishing line ahead of the fleet but the race for the official winner was amazing.

KB was 5½ minutes ahead of Color 7 at the final rounding mark and, along with the other leading skiffs, elected to sail a safety first course to the finishing line. Realising his only hope for victory was to sail the more direct, but more capsize likely, line, Murray and his crew pulled off the "impossible" with a brilliant exhibition of boat handling to grab race and championship victory.

Third place overall went to New Zealand's Russell Bowler, sailing a revolutionary foam-sandwich constructed Benson & Hedges, which was one-third lighter and had a comparatively smaller wetted surface area than other designs. It could have easily won the title had there been more favourable breezes and so impressed Australia's leading skippers that similar type boats were built for the following season's racing.

For the next five years (1978–1982, inclusive) Iain Murray, Andrew Buckland and Don Buckley were unbeatable in the Giltinan Championship despite the competition of some of the sport's greatest-ever skippers, and were also responsible for the design, construction and rigging of many of their opponents.

The likes of Trevor Barnabas, John Winning, Dave Porter, Peter Sorensen and Rob Brown tried in vain to unseat the master, but the Color 7 team was magnificent, as they re-wrote the history books - giving Murray his still unequalled six championship victories.

Special mention has to be given to Dave Porter. One of the greatest 18 ft skiff sailors of all time, Porter won only one Giltinan Championship but had the unenviable record of being runner-up on six occasions.

=== Beginning of the modern era ===
With the Murray influence gone, the 1983 championship looked likely to become a more even contest with so many talented skippers still in the fleet. Peter Sorensen, however, soon dispelled this theory when he skippered Tia Maria to five wins in the seven-race regatta at Auckland, then retained the crown the following year on Sydney Harbour (although this victory was much more hard fought).

Rob Brown and Trevor Barnabas shared the honours over the next four years (in 1988 they literally shared the honours). Brown won in 1985 with Bradmill on Waterloo Bay, Brisbane and with Entrad at Auckland in 1986 while Barnabas took victory with Chesty Bond at Perth in 1987. During the 1987 regatta, Barnabas' Chesty Bond carried a huge #1 mast, which measured an amazing 45 ft above the waterline.

There was always an "extreme competitiveness" between Brown and Barnabas and it more or less came to a head at Sydney in 1988. Brown had taken the championship on points but complicated new rules led to a protest against Brown at the conclusion of the contest for the use of an "illegal" spinnaker during the regatta.

The protest was upheld when the committee agreed that Barnabas had been prejudiced. They also determined that it was an official's error in not detecting the problem prior to the regatta and consequently declared Barnabas (Chesty Bond) and Brown (Southern Cross) as joint champions.

In complete contrast to the previous regatta, the 1989 contest on Sydney Harbour was an easy victory for Michael Walsh, who won each of the seven races in Prudential - the same skiff which had won the 1987 championship (as Chesty Bond) for Trevor Barnabas. Walsh had to fight hard at times but his winning margins were impressive - from 1min 40secs to 7mins.

In 1990 the Giltinan Championship returned to the Brisbane River for the first time since 1975 amid much controversy over the quality of racing conditions the river would provide for the skiffs of that time. One Sydney skipper was quoted: "How the hell do you sail on that drain?"

Windward speed was critical and Scott Ramsden's vBank of New Zealand was the fastest boat upwind. It enabled the young BNZ skipper to win four of the seven races and become Giltinan champion in his first season. For defending champion Michael Walsh, however, it was a most forgettable regatta as he and his team suffered gear failures, capsizes, 720-degree penalty turns and a collision with a ferry, all topped off when Walsh broke his leg in three places in the last race.

=== Evolution - Bethwaite design boats ===
The 1991 championship saw a major breakthrough in design by Julian Bethwaite, which enabled him to take his first Giltinan Championship (as a skipper). His skiff, AAMI, was built and rigged by Bethwaite for half the cost of the previous style boats and totally dominated the racing as she showed blistering speed across most wind ranges.

Bethwaite put the success down to 80 percent rig and the rest to the boat. The fleet in the regatta was reduced due to a split amongst Australian sailors, many of whom had chosen to compete in a privately funded national circuit. AAMI proved her champion status when Bethwaite and his crew also contested, and won, against all comers on the national circuit.

Bethwaite retained his Giltinan Championship title in 1992 with a clear victory over a 20-boat fleet on Sydney Harbour. He skippered a new AAMI skiff, which he designed and built for the championship and which won five of the seven races in a very impressive all round performance. The skiff had a slight boatspeed advantage but the racing was exciting for spectators as both Winfield Racing (Michael Spies) and Pace Express (David Witt) challenged strongly in most races.

Michael Spies had to recover from a less than spectacular start in the 1993 regatta before winning in Winfield Racing. He was forced to use all his experience to bring his skiff home with four consecutive wins in the final four races.

Neil Cashman, who was runner-up to Spies in 1993, led a talented team when he took the 1994 championship regatta in Nokia with a race to spare. The Nokia crew were among the heaviest in the fleet, which enabled them to gain upwind speed by carrying big rigs in the moderate winds throughout the series.

=== Modern rules are instated ===
The 1994 championship was significant in that it was the first sailed under the rules which largely still prevail today, whereby all the hulls come from one mould design and all skiffs have a maximum 14-foot wing span.

After winning the championship in 1993, Michael Spies disappointed the following year, but in 1995 he again took the title with a race to spare in Winfield Racing. With good boat speed and sound tactics in the shifty south-easterly breezes, Spies and his crew established a championship-winning lead by mid-regatta.

It was in strict contrast for Stephen Quigley's AEI-Pace Express in 1996, which had to recover from a poor start in the last race to win the championship after an extremely close series.

Trevor Barnabas had retired in the early 1990s after winning two Giltinan Championships but a subsequent return to the class produced three more championship victories to become the second most successful skipper behind the great Iain Murray.

Barnabas won the 1997 regatta (Omega Smeg-2UE) on Sydney Harbour after an intensely close battle with Brad Gibson (Southern Cross) in the last race, then took the skiff to Europe during the same calendar year to win (under the name Smeg) at Sardinia in a regatta which was contested under a different format to the regular Giltinan Championships.

The final championship victory for Trevor Barnabas came in 1998 when he successfully defended his title in the same Omega Smeg-2UE skiff. This was not only the last win for Barnabas, but it also brought to an end the 25 straight winning run by Australia since Terry McDell's victory for New Zealand in 1974.

For the first time since the inception of the event in 1938, a boat from the northern hemisphere won the championship when UK skipper Tim Robinson took a closely fought 1999 regatta in Rockport. The series produced six different winners in the seven races with Robinson the only two race winner in the fleet. This skiff was the same one which was runner up in 1998 when it represented Australia with John Harris as skipper.

Without a doubt, one of the most popular wins in the long history of the championship came in 2000 when John Winning was successful in AMP Centrepoint. Winning had been trying for 26 years and had previously finished as runner up twice to Iain Murray in 1980 and 1981.

Despite winning three of the seven races, AMP Centrepoint's victory was close with only 4.1 points separating the top three place getters in a strong international fleet. There were also many anxious moments for Winning and his crew as they had to survive the re-opening of an earlier protest on the morning of the last race.

John Harris, who was runner up to Trevor Barnabas in 1998, became the youngest skipper for several years to take out the Giltinan Championship when, at the age of 24 years, he steered Rag & Famish Hotel to a narrow victory in 2001. Harris and his crew won their last race in front of the largest spectator fleet since the 1980s to secure the title.

Howie Hamlin became the second northern hemisphere and first US skipper to win the Giltinan Championship when he led an all-US team to victory on board General Electric-US Challenge in 2002. The win was far from clear cut in a regatta of changing fortunes and the final result had everyone struggling with mathematics on the finishing line of the last race to determine the overall winner. The outcome saw Hamlin take the title by two points from defending champion John Harris (Rag & Famish Hotel).

The 2003 regatta provided the closest racing in the history of the championship and even the final result surprised the winner, defending champion Howie Hamlin.

Hamlin (General Electric/US Challenge) went into the last race trailing Rob Greenhalgh (RMW Marine). GE/US needed to win or finish second and hope that RMW Marine would finish worse than fifth. RMW was ahead of GE/US early in the race, was still fourth at the final leeward mark and looked to have the title won.

Unfortunately for Greenhalgh, RMW was on the wrong side of a wind shift and was passed by two competitors on the last beat and finished sixth, while Hamlin brought GE/US home in second place behind Tony Hannan's Total Recall. Hamlin returned to shore believing he had not won the title and took a lot of convincing by officials who showed him the final pointscore which gave him a 0.35 points victory.

While the northern hemisphere run of consecutive victories was extended to three in 2004, the result was totally unlike the previous two regattas when the UK champion Rob Greenhalgh (RMW Marine) was dominant with four race wins and two second placings. RMW's average winning margin was also a healthy two minutes.

=== Seve Jarvin era - 2005 to 2014 ===
Since 2005 when Euan McNicol won with Club Marine in his first season as a skipper (he had earlier crewed with John Winning in 2000), Australia has again dominated the championship.

Michael Coxon took the title in 2006 (Casio Seapathfinder), then defended it successfully in 2007 (Fiat) while young Seve Jarvin won impressively with Gotta Love It 7 in 2008. It was Jarvin's first season as skipper, although he was a previous winner when he crewed with Euan McNicol in 2005.

The 2009 regatta produced the closest finish in the Giltinan history with as many as four potential champions at various stages of the last race. Ultimately, Euan McNicol became another two-time winning skipper when he steered Southern Cross Constructions to victory.

The 2010 and 2011 championships produced similar results with Seve Jarvin's Gotta Love It 7 defeating Michael Coxon's Thurlow Fisher Lawyers in each series. The two wins made Jarvin a four-time winner (three as skipper and the one with McNicol as crew in 2005). The 2010 win was by 4 points while 2011 was won only after a countback.

Gotta Love It 7, skippered by Seve Jarvin (AUS) and crewed by Scott Babbage and Peter Harris, won the trophy in race 7 on Feb 24, 2013. The team won heat 7 in a 30 knot nor'easter with Jarvin saying, "it was the best one to win".

In 2014, Seve Jarvin, Sam Newton and Scott Babbage won the fifth consecutive trophy, amounting six titles for Jarvin, and so equalling the tally of the Gotta Love It 7 Program Manager, Iain Murray.

In 2015 Jarvin and his team won again on Gotta Love It 7.

In 2016 Jarvin's era came to an end. He sailed with a new crew and had a disappointing regatta finishing off the podium. The 2016 champions were Lee Knapton, Ricky Bridge and Mike McKensey sailing Smeg.

=== 2017 Controversy ===
The 2017 Championship was won by the Thurlow Fisher Lawyers team of Michael Coxon, Dave O'Connor and Trent Barnabas. 2nd place went to Coopers 62 Rag & Famish Hotel (Jack Macartney, Mark Kennedy and Peter Harris), and 3rd place and the final podium position went to the team from New Zealand on Yamaha (David McDairmid, Matt Steven and Brad Collins). The Kiwi team did win 4 out of the 7 races and were unlucky not to win the regatta, but consistency is the key in this regatta and Michael Coxon and his team never finished worse than 5th. Yamaha had 4 wins, a 5th and a disastrous 19th along with a DNF. The DNF is where the controversy lies. Yamaha won their first protest and gained average points; however, this protest was appealed by skiff legend David Witt sailing Appliances Online. The original decision was overturned without a hearing and without Yamaha able to counter the evidence. Yamaha was not allowed to appeal.

== List of past winners ==
Year	Boat name	Skipper
1938	Taree	(Australia) Bert Swinbourne
1939	Manu	(New Zealand) George Chamberlain
1948	Crows Nest	(Australia) Bill Hayward
1949	Marjorie Too	(Australia) Tony Russell
1950	Komutu	(New Zealand) Jack Logan
1951	Myra Too	(Australia) Bill Barnett
1952	Intrigue	(New Zealand) Peter Mander
1954	Intrigue	(New Zealand) Peter Mander
1956	Jenny VI	(Australia) Norm Wright
1958	Jantzen Girl	(Australia) Len Heffernan
1960	Surprise	(New Zealand) Bern Skinner
1961	Venom	(Australia) Ben Lexcen
1963	Schemer	(Australia) Ken Beashel
1964	Toogara	(Australia) Cliff Monkhouse
1965	Travelodge	(Australia) Bob Holmes
1966	Travelodge	(Australia) Bob Holmes
1967	Associated Motor Club	(Australia) Don Barnett
1968	Daily Telegraph	(Australia) Ken Beashel
1969	Travelodge	(Australia) Bob Holmes
1970	Thomas Cameron	(Australia) Hugh Treharne
1971	Travelodge	(Australia) Bob Holmes
1972	Smirnoff	(New Zealand) Don Lidgard
1973	Travelodge	(Australia) Bob Holmes
1974	Travelodge New Zealand	(New Zealand) Terry McDell
1975	KB	(Australia) Dave Porter
1976	Miles Furniture	(Australia) Stephen Kulmar
1977	Color 7	(Australia) Iain Murray
1978	Color 7	(Australia) Iain Murray
1979	Color 7	(Australia) Iain Murray
1980	Color 7	(Australia) Iain Murray
1981	Color 7	(Australia) Iain Murray
1982	Color 7	(Australia) Iain Murray
1983	Tia Maria	(Australia) Peter Sorensen
1984	Tia Maria	(Australia) Peter Sorensen
1985	Bradmill	(Australia) Robert Brown
1986	Entrad	(Australia) Robert Brown
1987	Chesty Bond	(Australia) Trevor Barnabas
1988	**Chesty Bond, **Southern Cross	(Australia) Trevor Barnabas / (Australia) Robert Brown
1989	Prudential	(Australia) Michael Walsh
1990	Bank of New Zealand	(Australia) Scott Ramsden
1991	AAMI	(Australia) Julian Bethwaite
1992	AAMI	(Australia) Julian Bethwaite
1993	Winfield Racing	(Australia) Michael Spies
1994	Nokia	(Australia) Neil Cashman
1995	Winfield Racing	(Australia) Michael Spies
1996	AEI-Pace Express	(Australia) Stephen Quigley
1997	Omega Smeg-2UE	(Australia) Trevor Barnabas
1997	Smeg	(Australia) Trevor Barnabas
1998	Omega Smeg-2UE	(Australia) Trevor Barnabas
1999	Rockport	(United Kingdom) Tim Robinson
2000	AMP Centrepoint	(Australia) John Winning
2001	Rag & Famish Hotel	(Australia) John Harris
2002	GE-US Challenge	(United States) Howie Hamlin
2003	GE-US Challenge	(United States) Howie Hamlin
2004	RMW Marine	(United Kingdom) Rob Greenhalgh
2005	Club Marine	(Australia) Euan McNicol
2006	Casio Seapathfinder	(Australia) Michael Coxon
2007	Fiat	(Australia) Michael Coxon
2008	Gotta Love It 7	(Australia) Seve Jarvin
2009	Southern Cross Constructions	(Australia) Euan McNicol
2010	Gotta Love It 7	(Australia) Seve Jarvin
2011	Gotta Love It 7	(Australia) Seve Jarvin
2012	Gotta Love It 7	(Australia) Seve Jarvin
2013	Gotta Love It 7	(Australia) Seve Jarvin
2014	Gotta Love It 7	(Australia) Seve Jarvin
2015	Gotta Love It 7	(Australia) Seve Jarvin
2016	Smeg	(Australia) Lee Knapton
2017	Thurlow Fisher Lawyers	(Australia) Michael Coxon
2018	Honda Marine	(New Zealand) Dave McDiarmid
2019	Honda Marine	(New Zealand) Dave McDiarmid
2020	Honda Marine	(New Zealand) Dave McDiarmid
2021	Smeg	(Australia) Michael Coxon
2022	Andoo	(Australia) Seve Jarvin
2023	Andoo	(Australia) John Winning Jr

|2024 |Yandoo | (Australia) Micah Lane |} |2025 |Yandoo | (Australia) Tom Needham |}
