= Sun Odyssey 43 =

Sailboat class

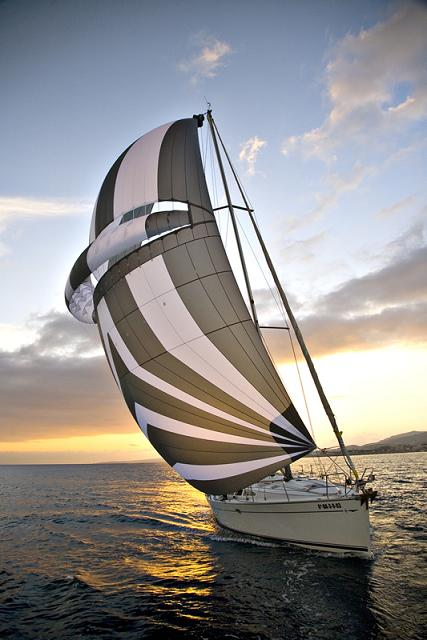
- Sun Odyssey 43 flying a Parasailor spinnaker

Development
- Designer: Daniel Andrieu
- Location: France United States
- Year: 1986
- Builder: Jeanneau
- Role: Cruiser
- Name: Sun Odyssey 43

Boat
- Displacement: 20,503 lb (9,300 kg)
- Draft: 6.56 ft (2.00 m)

Hull
- Type: monohull
- Construction: fiberglass
- LOA: 43.34 ft (13.21 m)
- LWL: 37.50 ft (11.43 m)
- Beam: 13.75 ft (4.19 m)
- Engine: 80 hp (60 kW) diesel engine

Hull appendages
- Keel: fin keel
- Ballast: 6,515 lb (2,955 kg)
- Rudder: spade-type rudder

Rig
- Rig type: Bermuda rig
- I foretriangle height: 51.67 ft (15.75 m)
- J foretriangle base: 15.29 ft (4.66 m)
- P mainsail luff: 45.11 ft (13.75 m)
- E mainsail foot: 16.40 ft (5.00 m)

Sails
- Sailplan: masthead sloop
- Mainsail area: 369.90 sq ft (34.365 m^{2})
- Jib/genoa area: 395.02 sq ft (36.699 m^{2})
- Total sail area: 764.92 sq ft (71.063 m^{2})

Racing
- PHRF: 117 (shoal draft model)

The Sun Odyssey 43 is a French sailboat that was designed by Daniel Andrieu as a cruiser and first built in 1986.

The Sun Odyssey 43 was also sold in a charter version as the Moorings 43.

The design is sometimes confused with the later Sun Odyssey 43 DS produced from 1994-2006.

== Production ==
The design was built by Jeanneau in France, starting in 1986, but it is now out of production.

== Design ==
The Sun Odyssey 43 is a recreational keelboat, built predominantly of fiberglass, with wood trim. It has a masthead sloop rig. The hull has a raked stem, a reverse transom, an internally mounted spade-type rudder controlled by dual wheels and a fixed fin keel or optional shoal draft keel. It displaces 20,503 lb (9,300 kg) and carries 6,515 lb (2,955 kg) of ballast.

The boat has a draft of 6.56 ft (2.00 m) with the standard keel and 5.25 ft (1.60 m) with the optional shoal draft keel.

The boat is fitted with a diesel engine of 80 hp (60 kW) for docking and maneuvering. The fuel tank holds 53 U.S. gallons (200 L; 44 imp gal) and the fresh water tank has a capacity of 106 U.S. gallons (400 L; 88 imp gal).

The design has sleeping accommodation for up to nine people in two, three and four cabin layouts. The three-cabin layout is typical. It has a double "V"-berth in the bow cabin, a U-shaped settee around a table in the main cabin and two aft cabins each with double berths. The galley is located on the port side at the companionway ladder. The galley is L-shaped and is equipped with a stove, an ice box and a double sink. A navigation station is opposite the galley, on the starboard side. There are two heads, one in the bow cabin on the starboard side and one on the starboard side, aft opposite the galley.

For sailing downwind the design may be equipped with a symmetrical spinnaker.

The design has a hull speed of 8.21 kn (15.20 km/h) and a PHRF handicap rating of 117 for the shoal draft keel model.

== See also ==
- List of sailing boat types
