= 18ft Skiff =

Class of sailboat

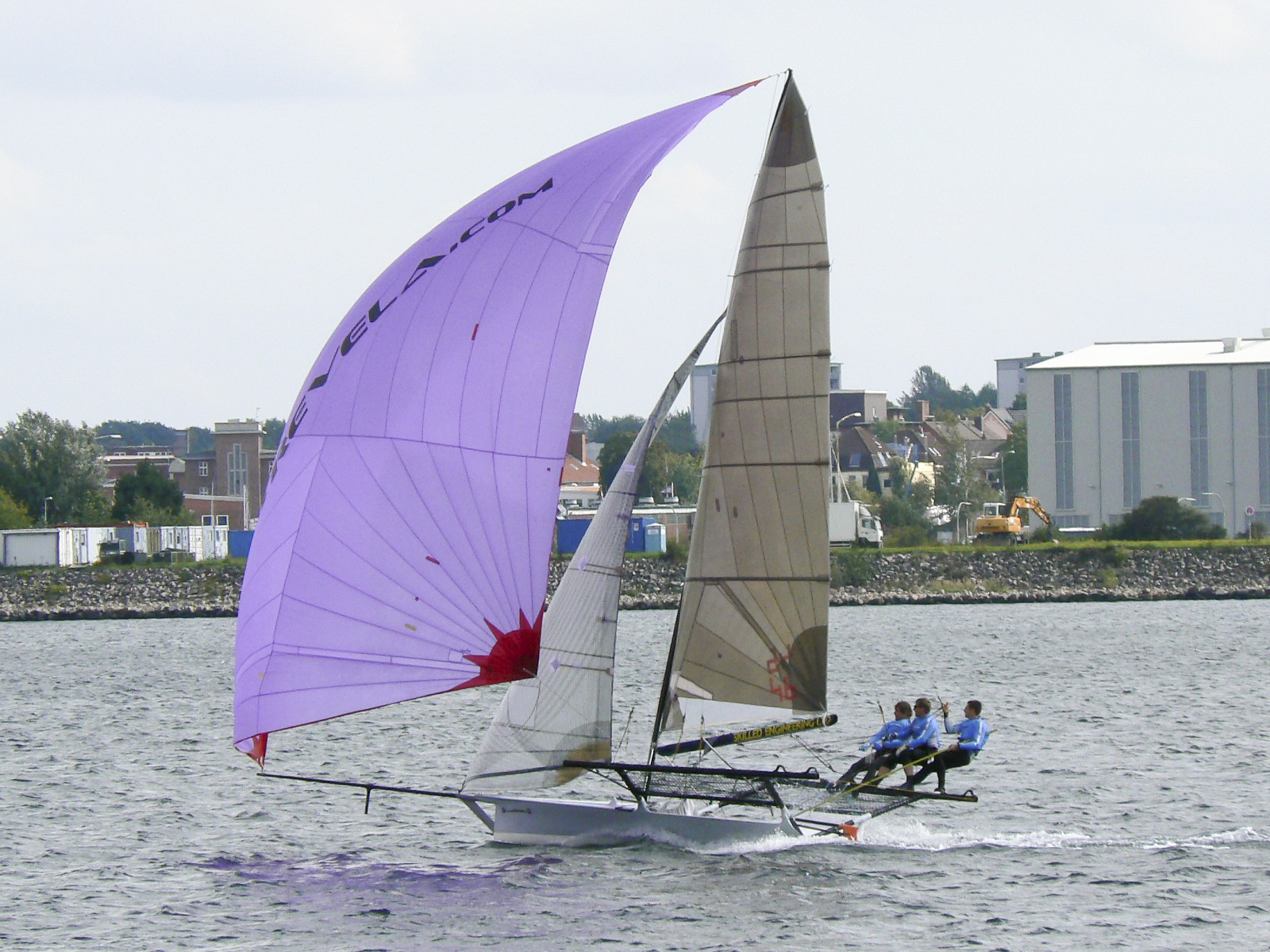
- 18ft Skiff in Kiel Harbor

Boat
- Crew: 3 (triple trapeze)

Hull
- Hull weight: 74 kg (163 lb)
- LOA: 8.9 m (29 ft)
- LWL: 5.49 m (18.0 ft)
- Beam: 2.0 m (6 ft 7 in)

Sails
- Jib/genoa area: 9.28 m^{2} (99.9 sq ft)
- Spinnaker area: Unlimited, typically 61–73 m^{2} (660–790 sq ft)
- Upwind sail area: Unlimited, typically 26–32 m^{2} (280–340 sq ft)

Racing
- RYA PN: 675

The 18 ft Skiff (or 18 Foot Skiff) is a high-performance sailing skiff. The class has a long history beginning with races on Sydney Harbour, Australia in 1892 and later in New Zealand. The boat has changed significantly since the early days, bringing in new technology as it became available. Because of the need of strength, agility and skill, the class is considered to be the top level of small boat sailing. Worldwide this boat is called the "18 Foot Skiff". It is the fastest conventional non-foiling monohull on the yardstick rating, with a score of 675, coming only third after the Tornado and Inter 20 (Both multihulls).

== History ==
The design of 18 ft Skiffs have changed significantly over 100 years of continuous development. Initially designed as heavy boats carrying a crew of ten or more, today they are lightweight, high performance boats.

== The modern 18 ft Skiff ==
Today there are two modern hull designs racing. The "International 18" is based on a design by Iain Murray, while the B18 was designed by Julian Bethwaite. The Australian 18 Footer League allows only the International 18, with the annual JJ Giltinan International Trophy contended with the one design Murray hull. The European Class Association allows both designs to compete against each other.

Although there are differences in the sailing aspects of the two designs, their measurements are very close, with a waterline length of 18 ft (5.49 m) and an average beam of 6 to 8 feet (1.83 to 2.44 m), not including the wings. With wings the maximum beam is 14 feet for the "International 18" and 18 feet for Open 18's sailed at Sydney Flying Squadron and Skiffs Australia. When the boat is dry it should weigh not less than 375 lb (170 kg) including wings, foils (centreboard and rudder) and the number one rig of sails, spars and ropes.

In the 1980s and '90s wings were widened substantially – some boats having maximum beam of 29 feet. Such wings proved unmanageable, with the crews too much on the brink of disaster for consistent success.

While 18 ft Skiffs have no sail area or mast height limitations, the limit that the 18 footer League has specified for their one-design sub-class is a maximum mast height of 33 ft (10 m), truly powerful on an 18' hull. The entire rig, which supports sails with unlimited area, is currently controlled by three trapezing crew members.

The boat will plane upwind starting at a true windspeed of about 8 knots, depending on sea conditions and off the wind can reach speeds that doubles the true windspeed. This is possible through the very high sail-carrying power to total weight ratio, which is above 30% with the no. 1 rig and approaches 40% with the no. 3 rig (for reference, a 30% ratio is needed to plane upwind and a 10% ratio is needed to plane at all. Most cruising boats have a ratio under 5%).

In Australia, there is a fleet of approximately 20–25 18 Foot Skiffs at the "League" club in Sydney. Sydney's other traditional 18 Foot Skiff club, the Sydney Flying Squadron, has a small fleet and there are several boats in the state of Queensland. In New Zealand the class following is smaller but reached its zenith in the 1970s when most designs were by Bruce Farr.

Using an 18 ft Skiff is challenging, owing to high speed, which requires fast reflexes and the awareness to anticipate changes. Nonetheless, major accidents occur even with experienced sailors.

Each year the JJ Giltinan International Trophy is contested on Sydney Harbour to decide the de facto world champion of the class. Typically the event was dominated by Australia and occasionally won by New Zealand, but in recent years entrants such as the USA's Howie Hamlin have taken out the title, displaying the classes growing international appeal.

== Design history ==
The first flying 18 footers were either carvel or clinker built with multiple steam bent frames. Cotton sails were used and spars were solid wood. The crew number varied according to the wind strength, often with a boy carried to bail out water. Initial designs were conventional displacement shapes with emphasis on narrow waterlines. In the early 1950s The Sydney boats put emphasis on carrying large extra sails down wind called ringtails. These were set outside the main with light spars top and bottom. They were carried in addition to spinnakers. In very light conditions watersails were carried under the main boom.

The most revolutionary boat of this period was the lightweight boat Result, from New Zealand, which was cold moulded with 2 skins of Kahikatea glued together and nailed to lightweight Mangeao bent steamed frames every 21 1/2 inches. At 6 ft 3inches Result was narrower than the conventional boats but still had the same full bow sections typical of the displacement style boats. Result had spaceframes of wood to support the mast and centreboard. In any breeze over 10 knots it was faster than any previous 18s because of its planing ability.

From this period increased knowledge and understanding of hydrodynamics and aerodynamics, coupled to the availability of plywood and reliable waterproof glues saw dramatic changes. Clinker and carvel construction was dropped and glued up hollow pear shaped masts became standard. By the late 1960s a greater understanding of the science behind planing saw hulls made with increasingly less rocker, very fine forward with very flat aft sections. Once trapezes were introduced the number of crew dropped to 4 by the early 70s and then to 3. Designs became wider, especially aft. As speeds increased so did capsizes, so an effort was made to install built in buoyancy and some self draining capabilities with transom flaps, venturi floor drains built in tanks, especially forward and false floors.

Foils became more hydrodynamic, especially after the availability of tank test models. Wood was dropped as a foil material in the 1980s and replaced by stiffer synthetic materials such as fibreglass then kevlar and carbon fibre. By 1970 hollow wooden spars were replaced by tapered aluminium of much smaller section and lighter weight. These in turn were replaced by much stiffer and lighter carbon fibre masts in the 1990s. Sail area got progressively larger especially when wings were added. This enabled small crews to sail with extremely large sails in stronger wind strengths. As most boats were sponsored they could have multiple rigs to match the wind strength.

Other modern features are carbon fibre prods (bowsprits) supported by bob stays, dolphin strikers and bow struts. This enabled quicker setting and dropping of the large downwind sails. Huge spinnakers could be set quickly by having halyards geared by mini blocks running internally in the mast. Dacron sails were replaced by much lighter stiffer less porous material such as mylar plastic. Weights of the bare hulls dropped quickly when New Zealand designer Bruce Farr, using his experience in Moth and Cherub designs used thin 3mm ply supported by multiple lightweight stringers and stiffened with tissue fibreglass. These were quickly followed by foam and fibreglass hulls first designed by Russell Bowler. Bare hulls weigh 120 lbs but are very strong with the use of carbon and kevlar to locally reinforce mast steps, centreboard cases, chain plates and wing attachment points. Rudders were placed 500mm aft of the hull to give more control in extreme planing conditions when only the last few feet of the hull was in contact with the water. With very wide tube and net decks up to 29 feet wide modern boats can carry very large powerful square-headed mainsails that have the controls to twist the head of the main in gusts to de-power. Flying 18 footers can now regularly exceed the actual wind speed when planing on all points of sailing.

These innovations have made the skiffs very fast but very expensive to build. In New Zealand this has seen the class decline dramatically as top sailors were attracted into the more conventional one design Olympic classes.

== Revival of early designs ==
In Sydney and Brisbane Australia there has been a revival of the early days of 18’ skiff sailing. Replicas of famous 18’ skiffs from the period of 1930 through to 1950 have been built using original techniques, including wooden hulls and spars, gaff rigs, several-piece spinnaker poles and unrestricted sail area. These boats race under the rules of the Australian Historical Skiff Association, which bans wings, trapezes, cleats for controlling ropes for the mainsail, jib and spinnaker, and most of the other modern equipment which makes sailing easier.

The class has proved very popular with former sailors of modern 18’ skiffs who, to quote a class champion John Winning, are looking for a challenge because "the modern boats have become too easy to sail".

The historical 18’ skiffs have a crew of between 6 and 9, which often leaves an opportunity for visiting sailors to have a ride. The AHSSA website listed below has more details.

At present the class is raced out of the Sydney Flying Squadron in Sydney and the Brisbane 18 Footers Sailing Club Inc. There are also bi-annual challenges against the New Zealand 18’ Kauri-Clinker M Class.

== See also ==
- JJ Giltinan International Trophy
- 12ft Skiff
