= B14 (dinghy) =

International racing sailing class

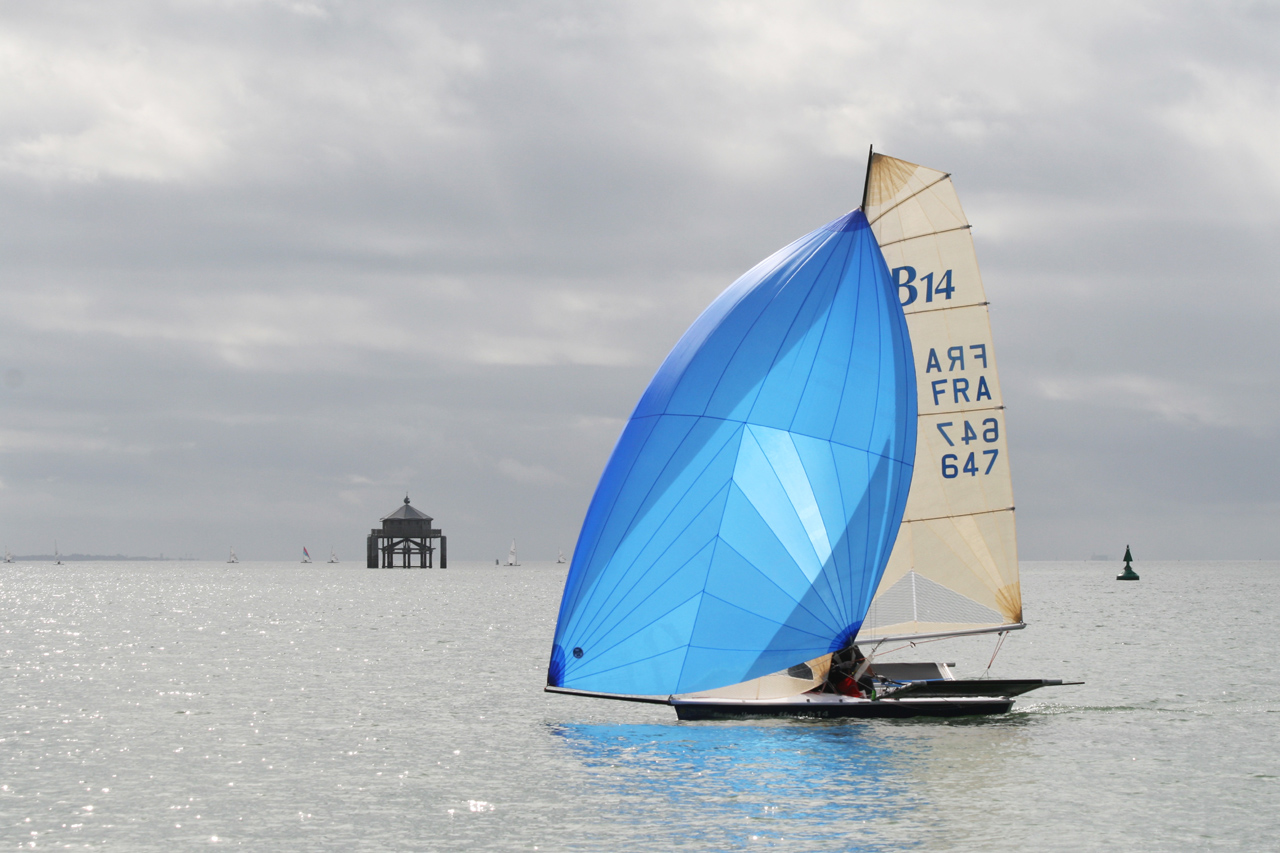

Boat
- Crew: 2

Hull
- Hull weight: 64 kg (141 lb)
- LOA: 4.25 m (13.9 ft)
- Beam: 3.05 m (10.0 ft)

Sails
- Spinnaker area: 29.2 m^{2} (314 sq ft)
- Upwind sail area: 17.2 m^{2} (185 sq ft)

Rating
- D-PN: 81.0
- RYA PN: 870

The B14 is a two-person monohull dinghy, designed by Julian Bethwaite. The boat was designed in 1984.

== Performance and design ==
The B14 is designed with a low center of gravity for added stability and an open transom, to help the boat to drain itself quickly and without need of a self-bailer. The mast is set far back in the boat to make room for the large asymmetric spinnaker. The boat has a fast handicap, with a Portsmouth Yardstick of 870, designed with racing in mind. For this reason it is highly suitable for more experienced sailors. The boat does not have a trapeze, but instead makes use of wide wings.

== Various ==
- RYA handicap 2012 : 870
- D-PN: 81.0.
