= Robert Greenhalgh =

British sailor (born 1977)

Rob Greenhalgh
Personal information
- Full name: Robert Greenhalgh
- Born: 17 August 1977 (age 48) Brighton, Sussex, UK

Sailing career
- Sport: Sailing
Medal record
Sailing
Representing Great Britain
World Championships
Silver medal – second place	2011 Torbay	SB20
Gold medal – first place	2004 Sydney	18ft Skiff
Gold medal – first place	2003 Wakayama	International 14
Silver medal – second place	2003 Carnac	18ft Skiff
European Championships
Gold medal – first place	1998 Helsinki	49er

Rob Greenhalgh (born 17 August 1977) is a British sailor who has competed in and won both the Volvo Ocean Race and the Extreme Sailing Series.

Greenhalgh has participated in the Volvo Ocean Race aboard ABN Amro I in the 2005–06 Volvo Ocean Race, Puma for Puma Ocean Racing Team in the 2008–09 Volvo Ocean Race, Azzam for Abu Dhabi Ocean Racing in the 2011–12 Volvo Ocean Race and on Maprfe in the 2014–15 Volvo Ocean Race.

He has also participated in the Extreme Sailing Series, winning it in 2007 (when it was known as the iShares Cup) and as Skipper of Team Duqm Oman in 2013, and in 2014 of Oman Air.

== Results ==
- 2016 - Moth World Championship - 3rd
- 2013 - UK Moth National Championships - 1 st
- 2011–12 - Volvo Ocean Race - Abu Dhabi Ocean Racing – 5 th
- 2008–09 - Volvo Ocean Race - PUMA – 2nd
- 2007 - America’s Cup - TEAMORIGIN
- 2007 - Extreme Sailing Series - 1st
- 2007 - Cowes Week, Class one – 1st
- 2005–06 - Volvo Ocean Race - ABN AMRO ONE – 1st
- 2004 - 18ft Skiff JJ Giltinan International Trophy – 1st
- 2004 – 18 ft Skiff European Championship – 1st
- 2004 – 18 ft Skiff National Championship – 1st
- 2003 - International 14 World Championship – 1st
- 2003 – 18 ft Skiff National Championship – 1st
- 2003 - Rolex Fastnet, Class Zero - 1st
- 2003 - 18ft Skiff JJ Giltinan International Trophy – 2nd
