= Sun Odyssey 43 DS =

Sailboat class

Development
- Designer: Daniel Andrieu
- Location: France
- Year: 1994
- Builder: Jeanneau
- Role: Cruiser-Racer
- Name: Sun Odyssey 43 DS

Boat
- Displacement: 21,054 lb (9,550 kg)
- Draft: 6.56 ft (2.00 m)

Hull
- Type: monohull
- Construction: fiberglass
- LOA: 42.13 ft (12.84 m)
- LWL: 37.50 ft (11.43 m)
- Beam: 13.75 ft (4.19 m)
- Engine: 75 hp (56 kW) diesel engine

Hull appendages
- Keel: fin keel with weighted bulb
- Ballast: 6,515 lb (2,955 kg)
- Rudder: spade-type rudder

Rig
- Rig type: Bermuda rig
- I foretriangle height: 50.80 ft (15.48 m)
- J foretriangle base: 15.29 ft (4.66 m)
- P mainsail luff: 44.49 ft (13.56 m)
- E mainsail foot: 17.06 ft (5.20 m)

Sails
- Sailplan: masthead sloop
- Mainsail area: 379.50 sq ft (35.257 m^{2})
- Jib/genoa area: 388.37 sq ft (36.081 m^{2})
- Total sail area: 767.87 sq ft (71.337 m^{2})

Racing
- PHRF: 117 (average)

The Sun Odyssey 43 DS (Deck Salon) is a French sailboat that was designed by Daniel Andrieu as a racer-cruiser and first built in 1994.

The design replaced the 1986 Sun Odyssey 43 in production.

== Production ==
The design was built by Jeanneau in France, from 1994 to 2006, but it is now out of production.

== Design ==
The Sun Odyssey 43 DS is a recreational keelboat, built predominantly of solid fiberglass, with wooden structural members. It has a masthead sloop rig, with a deck-stepped mast, two sets of swept spreaders and aluminum spars with stainless steel wire rigging. The hull has a raked stem, a reverse transom, an internally mounted spade-type rudder controlled by a singlewheel and a fixed fin keel with a weighted bulb or an optional shoal draft keel. It displaces 21,054 lb (9,550 kg) and carries 6,515 lb (2,955 kg) of ballast.

The boat has a draft of 6.56 ft (2.00 m) with the standard keel and 5.25 ft (1.60 m) with the optional shoal draft keel.

The boat is fitted with a diesel engine of 75 hp (56 kW) for docking and maneuvering. The fuel tank holds 53 U.S. gallons (200 L; 44 imp gal) and the fresh water tank has a capacity of 145 U.S. gallons (550 L; 121 imp gal).

The design was built in several cabin interior configurations. The two cabin version has sleeping accommodation for four people, with a double "V"-berth in the bow cabin, a U-shaped settee in the main cabin and an aft cabin with a central double berth. The galley is located on the starboard side just forward of the companionway ladder. The galley is L-shaped and is equipped with a two-burner stove, an ice box and a double sink. A navigation station is opposite the galley, on the port side. There are two heads, one just aft of the bow cabin on the port side and one on the port side in the aft cabin.

The design has a hull speed of 8.21 kn (15.20 km/h) and a PHRF handicap range of 96 to 117 with an average of 117.

== Operational history ==
The design has been used by private owners and also in the yacht charter market.

In a 2001 review in Sailing Magazine, John Kretschmer wrote, "Designed by Daniel Andrieu, the boat is nicely proportioned. The lines are modern with short overhangs and a generous beam of 13 feet, 8 inches. The low-slung coachroof extends quite far forward but still tapers gracefully into the foredeck."

Cruising World reviewer, Tim Murphy wrote in 2002, "Built of hand-laid fiberglass without a core, the 43 hull, like other Jeanneau sailboats, is stiffened with laminated-wood longitudinal stringers and ring frames and without structural liners."

Writing in Practical Sailor in 2001, Darrell Nicholson described, "sailing in 5- to 7-knot winds under full main and 135-percent genoa, she registered 5.5 to 6 knots of boatspeed sailing hard on the breeze into a 2 -3′ swell. Considering that the rig needed tuning and she was equipped with furlers on both sails, we consider that good performance. We noted that an increase of only two knots in windspeed increased boatspeed over the ground to more than six knots while sailing into an ebbing current."

== See also ==
- List of sailing boat types
