= Tacker =

Tacker is a surname. Notable people with the surname include:

- Francine Tacker (born 1946), American actress
- Karan Tacker (born 1986), Indian actor

== See also ==
- Acker
- Hammer tacker
- Tackers
- Tocker
- Tucker (surname)
