= Spinnaker =

Sail designed for sailing off the wind

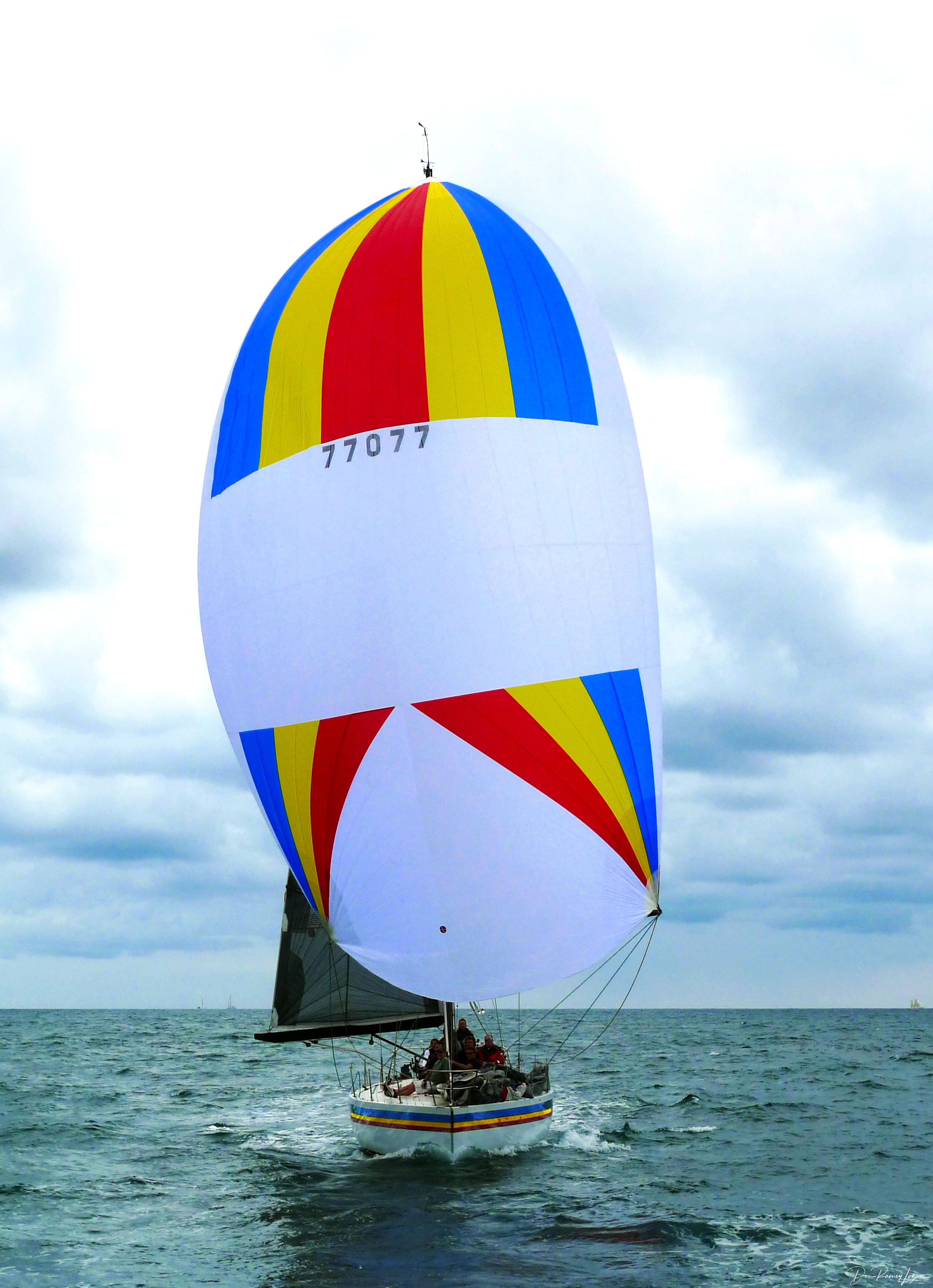
Amante, a 1983 "Choate 48" in Newport Beach, California, in February 2015 flying a symmetric spinnaker

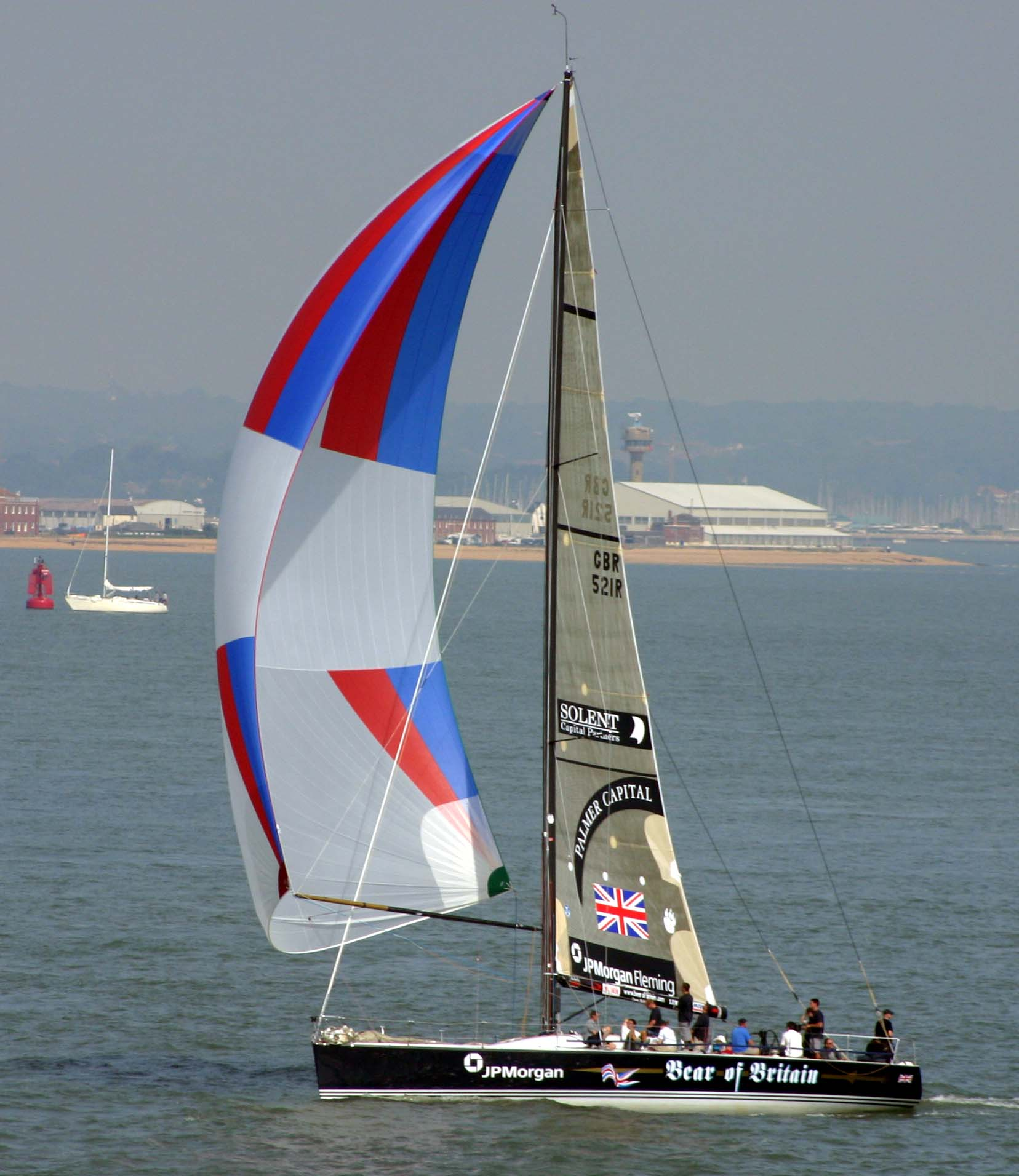
Bear of Britain, a Farr 52 with masthead spinnaker in front of Calshot Spit

A spinnaker is a sail designed specifically for sailing off the wind on courses between a reach (wind at 90° to the course) to downwind (course in the same direction as the wind). Spinnakers are constructed of lightweight fabric, usually nylon, and are often brightly colored. They may be designed to perform best as either a reaching or a running spinnaker, by the shaping of the panels and seams. They are attached at only three points and said to be flown.

== Etymology ==
Some dictionaries suggest that the origin of the word could be traced to the first boat to commonly fly a spinnaker, a yacht called Sphinx, mispronounced as Spinx. Sphinx first set her spinnaker in the Solent in 1865, and the first recorded use of the word was in 1866 in the August edition of Yachting Calendar and Review (p. 84). In addition, the term may have been influenced by the spanker, originally a gaff rigged fore-and-aft sail.

Another suggestion is that the idea for the sail was conceived in 1865 by William Gordon, owner of the racing yacht Niobe. He wanted to name the sail after his yacht but a crewman's comment, "Now there's a sail to make her spin" became "spin maker" which developed into the commonly accepted term spinnaker. Gordon was widely known in the yachting world of the time as "Spinnaker Gordon".

It has been pointed out, however, that the skippers of Thames sailing barges also used the term spinnaker for their jib staysails. Unlike the other, tanned sails of these boats, the spinnakers were usually white. It has thus been suggested that the term could be "connected with the obsolete word spoon, meaning to run before the wind (cf. spindrift)." Early usage of the verb to spoon can be traced back to the 16th century; the change from spoon to spin in the term spindrift is attributed to a local Scottish pronunciation. According to Merriam Webster's dictionary, however, spindrift derives from a local Scottish pronunciation of speen (not spoon), meaning "to drive before a strong wind."

According to Merriam-Webster's etymology, the origin of the word spinnaker is simply unknown.

== Types ==
There are two main categories of spinnakers, symmetric and asymmetric depending on whether a plane of symmetry exists for that particular sail. Asymmetric spinnakers operate more like a jib, generating lift from the side, rather than the top like a symmetric spinnaker. This makes asymmetrics a better choice on reaching courses than symmetric spinnakers, which excel when running. While a fully equipped racing boat might have a number of spinnakers, both symmetric and asymmetric, to cover all courses and wind conditions, cruising boats almost always use an asymmetric, due to the broader application and easier handling afforded by the asymmetric.

=== Symmetric ===
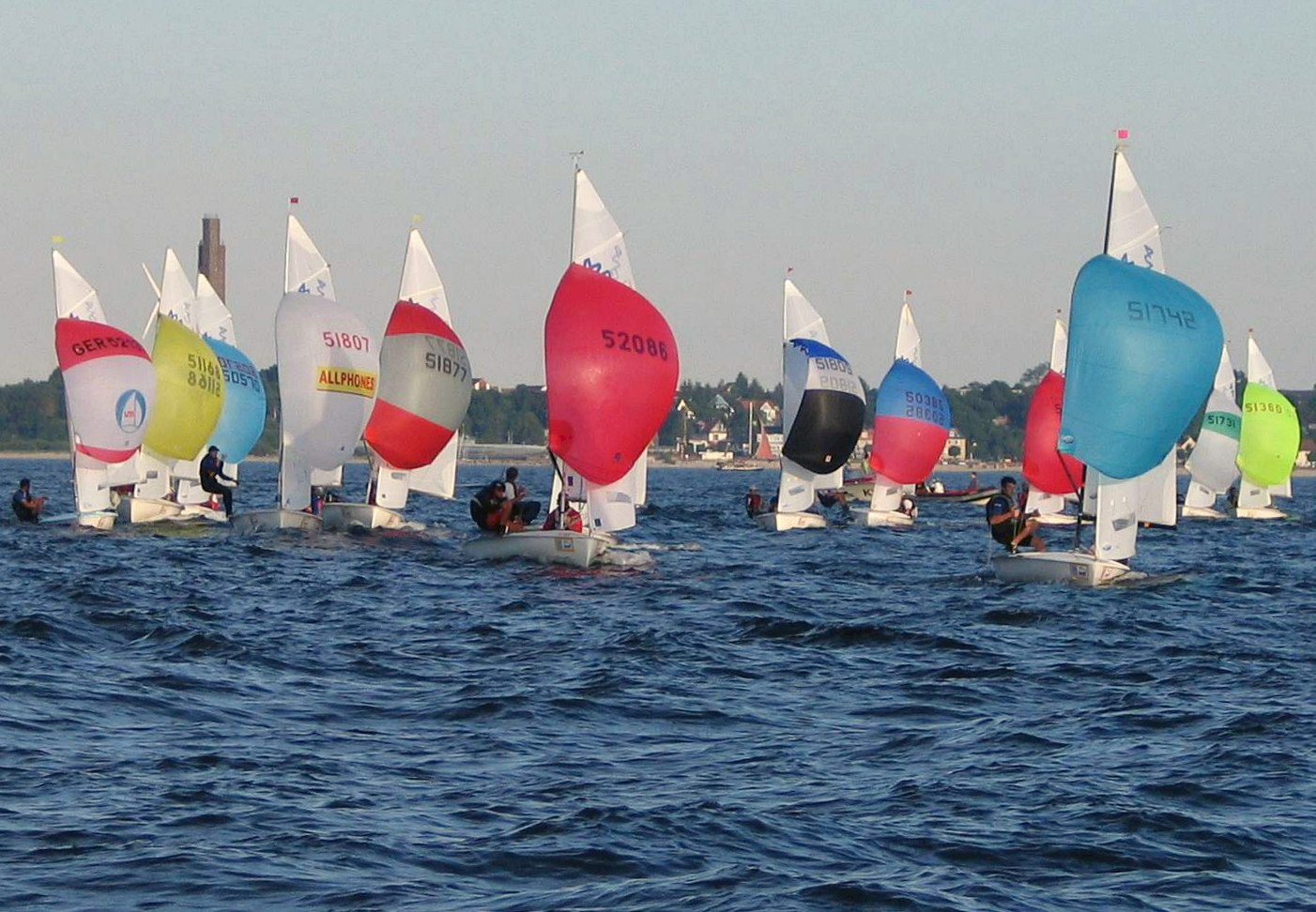
420 class dinghies with symmetric spinnakers.

The symmetric one is the most classic type, running symmetrically alongside the boat controlled by lines known as a sheet and a guy running from the lower two corners of the sail. The windward line, or guy, is attached to the corner called the tack of the sail, and is stabilized by a spinnaker pole. The leeward (downwind) line is called the sheet. It attaches to the clew of the spinnaker and is used to control the shape of the sail. The spinnaker pole must be moved in each gybe, and is quite difficult for beginners to use. However, it can be sailed in all downwind wind directions.

Symmetric spinnakers when sailing across the wind (reaching) develop most of their lift on the forward quarter, where the airflow remains attached. When correctly set for reaching, the leading edges of a symmetric spinnaker should be nearly parallel to the wind, so the flow of air over the leading edge remains attached. When reaching, the sail camber allows only some attached flow over the leeward side of the spinnaker. On running the spinnaker is angled for maximum drag, with the spinnaker pole at right angles to the apparent wind. The symmetric spinnaker also requires care when packing, since the three corners must be available on the top of the packing.

==== Parasailor ====
A Parasailor is a symmetrical spinnaker with a paraglider wing inserted into a gap in the sail approximately mid-way up. This feature makes the sail easier to keep inflated, but detracts from its performance. The sail may be flown on a spinnaker pole or with the tack attached to the bow of the boat.

=== Asymmetric ===
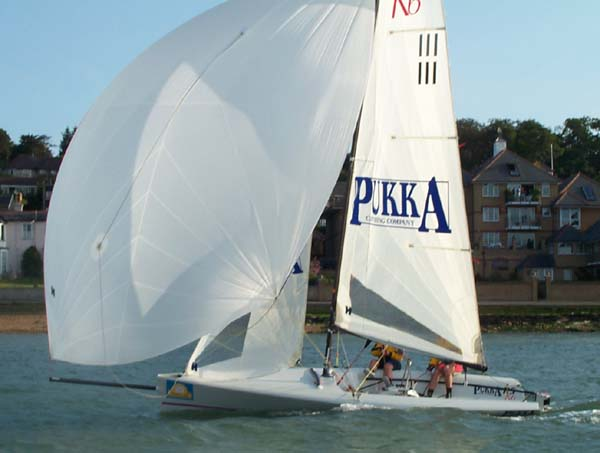
RS K6 keelboat with an asymmetric spinnaker on a retracting bowsprit.

Asymmetrical spinnakers resembling large jibs and flown from spinnaker poles are not a new idea and date back to at least the 19th century. However, in the 1980s a new concept appeared, starting with the Sydney Harbour 18ft Skiff fleet.

Since the 1960s, many faster sailing craft, starting with catamaran classes, have discovered that it is faster to sail downwind on a series of broad reaches with efficient airflow across the sail rather than directly downwind with the sails stalled. This technique had developed to the extent that in bar conversation at the end of one season Andrew Buckland observed that the 18s had sailed all season without pulling the spinnaker pole back from the forestay and that all the systems could be simplified by eliminating the pole and setting the spinnaker from a fixed (but often retractable) bowsprit. The concept quickly evolved to a sail with a loose luff much more like a conventional spinnaker than the old jib-style asymmetric sails. Julian Bethwaite was the first to rig and sail a boat with one the next season, followed shortly by Andrew Buckland. The first modern offshore sailboats to incorporate a retractable bow sprit and an asymmetric spinnaker was the J/Boats J/105.

The concept has spread rapidly through the sailing world. The tack of the sail may be attached at the bow like a genoa but is frequently mounted on a bowsprit, often a retracting one. If the spinnaker is mounted to a special bowsprit, it is often possible to fly the spinnaker and the jib at the same time; if not, then the spinnaker will be shadowed by the jib, and the jib should be furled when the spinnaker is in use.

The asymmetric has two sheets, very much like a jib, but is not attached to the forestay along the length of the luff, but only at the corners. Unlike a symmetric spinnaker, the asymmetric does not require a spinnaker pole, since it is fixed to the bow or bowsprit. The asymmetric is very easy to gybe since it only requires releasing one sheet and pulling in the other one, passing the sail in front of the forestay. Asymmetrics are less suited to sailing directly downwind than spinnakers, and so instead the boat will often sail a zig-zag course downwind, gybing at the corners. An asymmetric spinnaker is particularly effective on fast planing dinghies as their speed generates an apparent wind on the bow allowing them to sail more directly downwind. It is also particularly useful in cruising yachts in the form of a cruising spinnaker or cruising chute, where the ease of handling is important.

==== Cruising ====
A cruising chute is a form of asymmetric spinnaker used by cruising yachts and designed for easy use when short-handed. Two sheets are used, with the tack line eased by a foot or so before gybing. Alternatively, only one sheet is used, with the sail snuffed before a gybe.

==== Code Zero ====
A Code Zero is a light-weight sail that approaches the dimensions of a genoa jib, for light airs and points of sail up to a close reach. It may be launched furled on its own stay.

=== Ratings ===
The following codes are used for both symmetric and asymmetric sails.

- Code 1 is a light air reaching sail, where the apparent wind angles at low speeds has a significant effect to create angles of less than 90 degrees.
- Code 2 is a medium air running sail, used for apparent wind angles over 90 degrees.
- Code 3 is a medium air reaching sail, used for apparent wind angles near 90 degrees.
- Code 4 is a heavy air running sail, used in the heaviest winds normally expected.
- Code 5 is a heavy air reaching sail, used in the heaviest winds normally expected.
- Code 6 is a storm sail, for running in storm conditions.

== Setting the sail ==
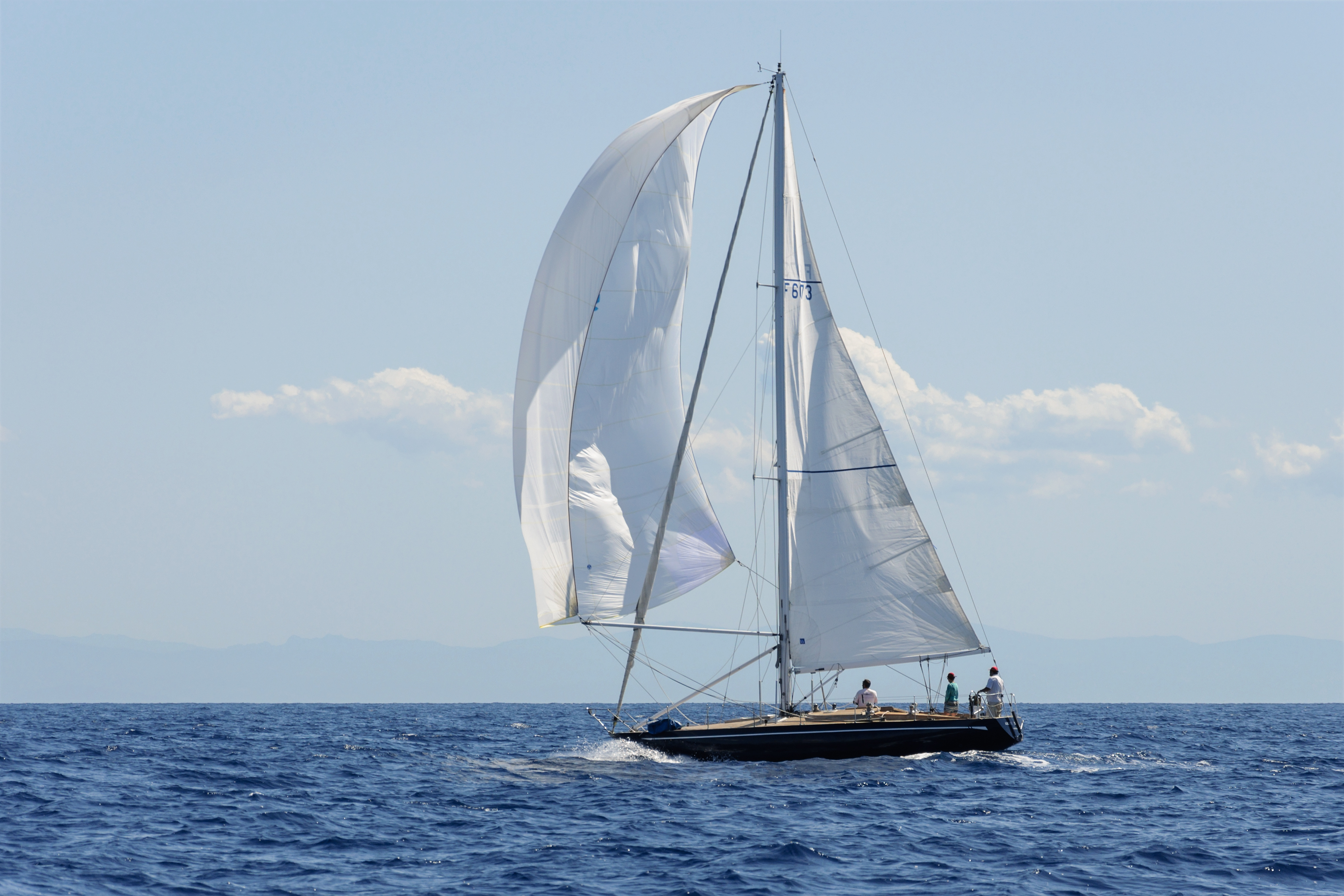
Aigue Blu raising her spinnaker during the Corsica Classic 2013 yacht race

Since they will only be used on certain points of sail, raising and lowering the spinnaker is a task that is often performed while under sail. Due to the size of spinnakers (the spinnaker is often double or more the size of the mainsail) this can be a difficult operation, since the sail will immediately catch the wind.

=== Symmetric ===
Typically the symmetric spinnaker is packed in its own bag, called a turtle, with the three corners on top for ready access. The clews (lower corners) are controlled by lines called sheets. The sheets are run in front (outside) of the forestay and lead to the back of the boat. The head (top corner) is attached to the spinnaker halyard, which is used to raise the sail up the mast.

Symmetric spinnakers have the windward clew secured to a spinnaker pole. The pole is attached to the mast and holds the windward edge of the sail in position. Lines that control the spinnaker pole are called guys or braces. The spinnaker pole may be allowed to raise and lower with the force of the wind, or it may have lines attached to it to raise (the topping lift) and lower (the foreguy or downhaul) the angle of the pole. If these lines are used, they are generally set up before setting sail and left in place even when the spinnaker is stowed.

Since spinnakers are downwind sails, they are never tacked, they are only jibed. When jibing a symmetric, the pole is removed from one corner and attached to the opposite corner. This corner now becomes the windward corner. There are two ways this is done. Generally on smaller boats, an end-for-end jibe is accomplished by disconnecting the pole at the mast-end and connecting the mast end to the opposite side of the sail. The old sail end is disconnected and then attached to the mast. This prevents the pole from getting loose during the procedure and allows the use of only two control lines that alternate as sheet and guy (more on this below). End-for-end jibing requires a pole with identical fittings at either end. Larger boats do a dip-pole gybe (jibe) in which the pole remains attached to the mast and the outer end is lowered until it can clear the head-stay and is then raised back up on the other side of the boat to the proper height with the topping lift. The guys are adjusted as before to set the sail angle on the new course. Dip-pole jibing can use a pole with one mast end and one sail end.

Smaller boats tend to use only one line on each clew (a combination guy and sheet). The windward line that runs through the jaw of the spinnaker pole is referred to as the guy (as opposed to foreguy) and the one on the free-flying corner is referred to as the sheet. During a jibe, these roles and thus the names are reversed. Larger boats may choose to use both a sheet and guy on each corner, with the guy being a heavier line. Having 2 sets of lines will makes the jibe easier as the kite is flown by the two sheets while the crew at the bow and at the mast are removing one guy from the pole and attaching it to the other with no tension on them.

Retrieving the spinnaker is a multi-step process, and the take-down depends on wind position. First, the windward corner is detached from the spinnaker pole and the guy is released. This step is referred to as blowing the guy. This allows the spinnaker to collapse into the shadow of the mainsail, where the foot is gathered by a crew member. The halyard is then lowered, and a crew member gathers the sail and stuffs it carefully into the turtle, corners out, and ready for the next deployment. There are, however many other ways to retrieve the spinnaker depending on the conditions and intent. It may or may not go into a turtle. It may be pulled back into the cockpit & then down below to be repacked for the next hoist or be pulled in a foredeck hatch and left free for the next hoist.

=== Asymmetric ===
Like the symmetric, the asymmetrical spinnaker is often stored in a turtle, with the corners on top for easy access. While a symmetric spinnaker is flown with a "guy" and a "sheet", an asymmetric spinnaker is flown with a tackline and a "sheet." The tack attaches to the bow or (often retractable) bowsprit, and the two sheets attach to the clew. The head of the sail is attached to the spinnaker halyard, which is used to raise the sail. The sheets are passed to either side of the forestay, attached to the clew; they may be passed forward of the luff of the asymmetric, or aft of the luff of the asymmetric, between the tack line and the forestay. The sheet on the downwind (lee) side of the hull is used to trim the sail, and the opposite sheet is left slack. Often a tack line is used at leading edge to provide adjustable tension on the luff of the spinnaker. To keep the tack near the centerline of the boat, it may be attached to the forestay with a sliding collar (often riding over the furled jib on parrel beads, tacker or similar device) adjustable with a down haul, or tack line. This allows the tack to slide up and down the forestay to adjust the luff tension. On racing boats, the tack of the asymmetric is often rigged to a retractable bowsprit, which increases the foretriangle area and prevents interference with the jib. As this trend becomes more popular in racing boats, it may result in similar adaptations to cruising boats as well.

Jibing with the asymmetric is much less complex than the symmetric, due to the lack of the spinnaker pole. Much like a jib, all that is required is to change sheets; however, since the asymmetric still flies in front of the forestay, the operation is reversed. The loaded sheet is slackened, and the opposite (lazy) sheet is pulled in, which allows the sail to pass around in front of the forestay, and then be sheeted in on the new lee side of the boat.

Retrieving the asymmetric is similar to the process for the symmetric. The sheets are released, allowing the sail to collapse to the front of the boat. The foot of the sail is then gathered, the halyard released and the head of the sail lowered, where it is packed into the turtle.

=== Dousing socks ===
The dousing sock, spinnaker sleeve, snuffer, or just sock, is a device used to make deploying and retrieving the spinnaker a much easier task. The sock is a long fabric tube with a ring in one end to hold it open. Since the spinnaker is stored in the sock, the first step is to set up the sock. Two lines are attached to the sock; one is attached to a bridle on the ring, for pulling the sock down, and one is up the inside, from the ring, through the top, and back down, for raising the sock; these lines may be two ends of the same line, to form a loop. The head of the spinnaker is attached to the top of the sock and the ring runs down to the tack. The resulting bundle is stuffed into the spinnaker bag. The top of the sock will have provisions for attaching to the spinnaker halyard.

The spinnaker is raised as normal, but with the sock in place, the spinnaker is unable to catch the wind. Once the spinnaker is raised and the guys are ready to set, the sock is raised, releasing the spinnaker. The sock remains bundled up at the head of the sail while the spinnaker is deployed. To retrieve the spinnaker, the sheet or the tack is released and the sock is pulled down, gathering the sail. The halyard is then dropped and the sail may be packed away.

== Spinnaker launching and dousing systems ==
As of 2006, there were a variety of means to aid the launching (hoisting) and dousing (taking down) of a spinnaker—a sail which, in lacking luff support, is "more unstable and more difficult" to handle in these and related situations. One system focuses on the launching of the spinnaker, only, and it makes use of special sail-packing and a funnel system that places breakable elastic bands as the sail is launched, bands that break as sheet and guy of the filled spinnaker are trimmed.

Other systems use means that assist with both launching and dousing, and such systems include:

- sail modification to include a center patch and cringle to attach a retriever line (also termed a "takedown line") to use in sail launching and dousing, and use of a funnel-terminating, hull-affixed tubular launcher for storage and launching (through which the retriever passes); and
- used of a tubular, ring-ended sleeve or "sock" which also stores the sail, which after launching (sock hoisting) is rigged such that the sock's top ring is toward the halyard and bottom ring toward the deck, where release of the spinnaker is accomplished by rigging that draws the bottom ring toward the halyard, allowing the bottom of the sail to fill, a design that leaves the collapsed sock aloft "at the head of the spinnaker while it is flying".

=== Spinnaker chutes ===
A spinnaker chute is a means of launching and dousing (recovering) the spinnaker. Found most commonly on modern dinghy designs and updated older classes, it often consists of a tube or an aperture mounted on the deck close to the forestay. To allow recovery of the spinnaker into the chute during dousing, the spinnaker is fitted with one or more recovery patches to, or through which, the tail of the spinnaker halyard is attached or passed; the spinnaker head and its halyard form a continuous loop, passing through the chute.

If the spinnaker chute is within the hull and is required to be watertight, it takes the form of a hard tube sealed to the hull at both ends. If a watertight arrangement is not required, a cloth tube may be used to contain the lowered spinnaker.

== Other uses ==
A masthead, symmetrical spinnaker is occasionally used for entertainment at anchor to loft a person hanging beneath it above the water. To work, the vessel must be anchored stern to the wind to allow the sail to extend out over the bow.
