= Nippa (dinghy) =

Nippa Sailing Dinghy
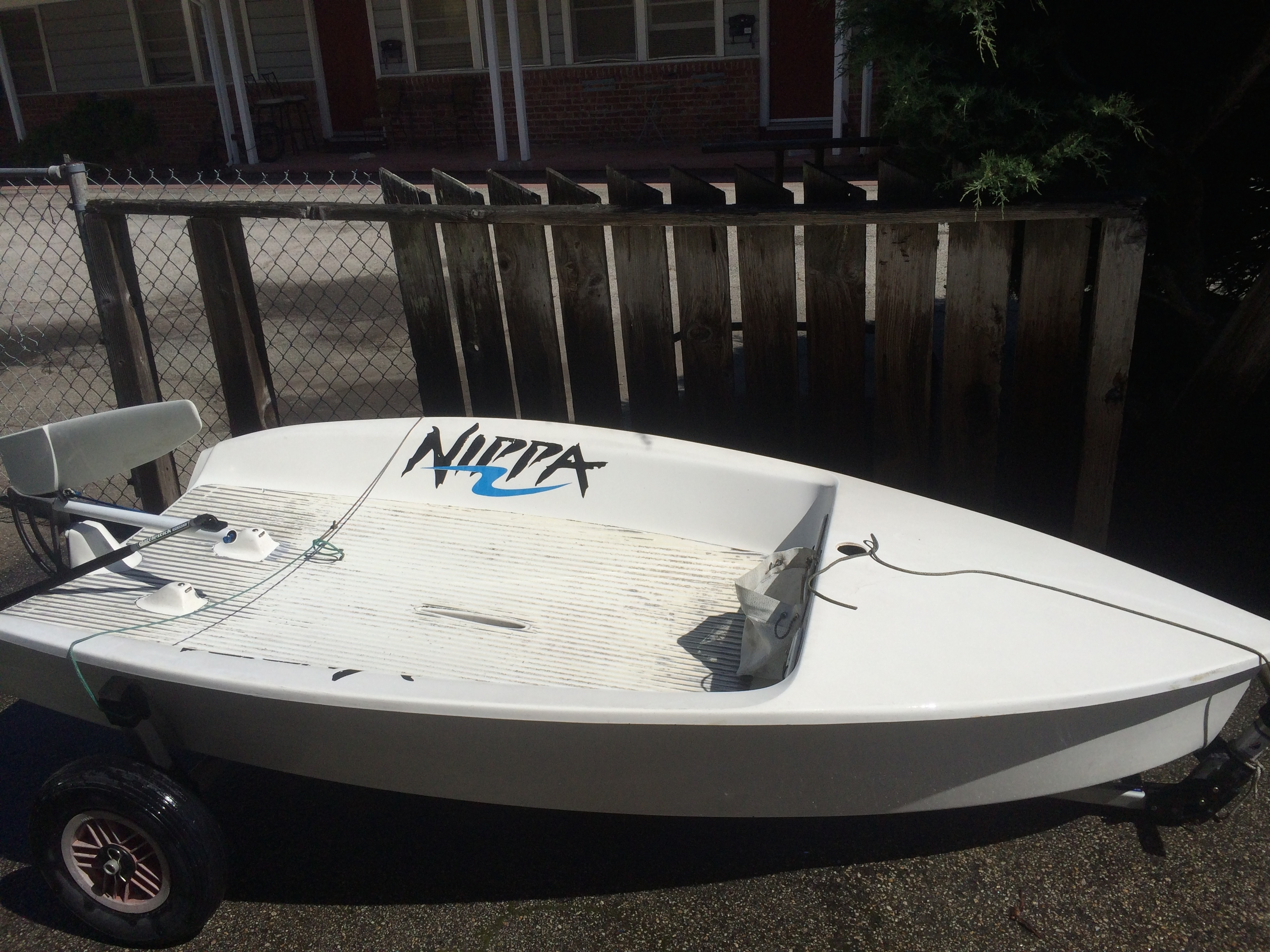
- The Nippa Dinghy after many years in storage in Santa Cruz, California. This boat is believed to be the first Nippa exported to the US.

Development
- Designer: Iain Murray, Murray Burns & Andy Dovell
- Location: Sydney, Australia
- Year: 2004
- Design: Sails: North Sails Australia;
- Name: Nippa Sailing Dinghy

Boat
- Crew: Double or Single Handed
- Trapeze: No

Hull
- Construction: Sydney Yachts; Hull: Vacuum Molded E-Glass, PVC Foam Core; Spars: Carbon Filament Wound and Spun Tapered; Centerboard: Plastic Injection Moulded; Rudder: Plastic Injection Moulded, Alloy Casting Rudder Frame;
- Hull weight: 25 kg (55 lb)
- LOA: 2.65 m (8 ft 8 in)
- Beam: 1.38 m (4 ft 6 in)

Rig
- Mast height: 4.12 m (13.5 ft)

Sails
- Total sail area: 6 m^{2} (65 sq ft)

The Nippa is a small Australian dinghy designed by Iain Murray in 2004. The Nippa dinghy was designed for young sailors between five and fourteen years of age, or a young sailor and instructor. Its open back design was to provide easy movement as well as a self-bailing feature.

The company now appears to be defunct.

== History ==
When Iain and his wife Alex Murray began encouraging their children to sail, they found the resources at their sailing club unfit for a successful learning experience. Many students were exhausted and frustrated by constant capsize recovery and bailing of the old, heavy, often-damaged, and unexciting dinghy fleet they were taught in. Looking for a better design, they set out to "provide children with limited or no sailing experience an enjoyable boat that would deliver great performance, be easy to maintain, simple to store as well as being safe and robust and 'looked cool' too."

Iain teamed up with Andy Dovell of Murray Burns and Dovell Yacht Designers, Michael Coxon of North Sails Australia, and renowned yachtsman Rob Brown to 'design and build an affordable, modern, safe, innovative, durable, simple and fun one design training class for children'.

They developed and launched a prototype which they tested in a variety of conditions, frequently updating and balancing and ultimately arrived at the Nippa design. Nippa began selling in 2004 under the Azzura Marine Group. Touting the simple to rig and simple to sail dinghy for five- to fourteen-year-olds. They marketed it to sailing clubs as buoyant, stable and exciting with hull features that complemented bumpy water and great for developing a training fleet.

Ian donated 10 Nippas to the Avalon Sailing Club in 2004 to encourage use.

=== First Nippa to the United States ===
The first Nippa to arrive in the United States was sailed out of Santa Cruz, California by Philippe Kahn's Pegasus Racing Team Sailing Manager, Anthony Young.

=== The Nippa Class Association ===
Nippa noted that "As demand grows the Nippa Class Association will be rolled out." however, it is not obvious at this time if the class association was established or not.

As of 2006, Nippas had been sold locally in Victoria, New South Wales, Queensland and Western Australia and internationally in South Africa, the United States and England.

In 2006, Nippa Sailing was working towards a national championship to be held in Sydney in January 2006.

=== Class rules ===
The Nippa is a one design class. It is intended that the Nippa will be raced in one-up and two-up formats.

There are solid class rules that include: age restrictions for competition, restrictions on fittings and any changes to the equipment. There are guidelines on how a Nippa regatta will be conducted. A class association will issue class memberships and measurement certificates to ensure fair competition and a good flow of information.

== Design ==
The Nippa is a stable computer designed hull shape, constructed of very rigid Vacuum molded E Glass with PVC Foam Core for durability and with minimal fittings (Ronstan) for simplicity of learning and use, for instance, there is no mainsheet cleat. The rig is designed of lightweight carbon and anti-corrosive materials and the mast is unstayed.

=== Features ===
- Boom mounted mainsheet block
- Cockpit bag for storage
- Permanent tow rope eye attached to the bow for safety.
- Flush centerboard case to allow easier movement in the cockpit and no retention of water in the cockpit.
- Lanyards on all loose fittings so parts won't be lost.
- Two-piece baffled mast for ease of transport and positive buoyancy.

=== Costs ===
The Nippa was sold from the factory and included a cradle and "everything you need to sail the Nippa" for A$4,800.

Individual spars and blades could also be purchased directly from the factory:

- Mast: A$335
- Boom: A$180
- Centerboard: A$250
- Rudder Blade: A$150
- Rudder, Rudder Box & Tiller Extension: A$315
- Mainsail: A$486

=== Color ===
The Nippa sails and decals are available in seven colors, including: Orange, Red, Pink, Green, Dark Blue, Mid Blue and Yellow. The colors were designed as a marketing tool for children as well as an identification tool for parents.

=== Design awards ===
- A Commendation Award for Sailing Trailerable Category, Boat Of The Year Awards, 2005

== See also ==
Dinghy
