= Robert Brown (sailor) =

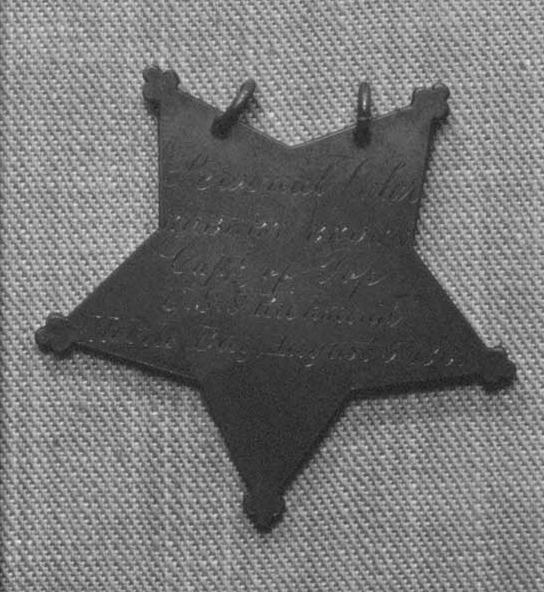
- Reverse of Brown's Medal of Honor
- Born: c. 1830; Norway
- Military career
- Allegiance: United States
- Branch: United States Navy
- Rank: Captain of the Top
- Unit: USS Richmond
- Conflicts: American Civil War • Battle of Mobile Bay
- Awards: Medal of Honor

Robert Brown (born c. 1830) was a Union Navy sailor in the American Civil War and a recipient of the U.S. military's highest decoration, the Medal of Honor, for his actions at the Battle of Mobile Bay.

Born in about 1830 in Norway, Brown immigrated to the United States and was living in New York when he joined the U.S. Navy. He served during the Civil War as a captain of the top on the USS Richmond. At the Battle of Mobile Bay on August 5, 1864, he was "[c]ool and courageous" despite heavy fire. For this action, he was awarded the Medal of Honor four months later on December 31, 1864.

Brown's official Medal of Honor citation reads:

On board the U.S.S. Richmond in action at Mobile Bay on 5 August 1864. Cool and courageous at his station throughout the prolonged action, Brown rendered gallant service as his vessel trained her guns on Fort Morgan and on ships of the Confederacy despite extremely heavy return fire. He participated in the actions at Forts Jackson and St. Philip, with the Chalmette batteries, at the surrender of New Orleans and in the attacks on batteries below Vicksburg.
