= Parasailor =

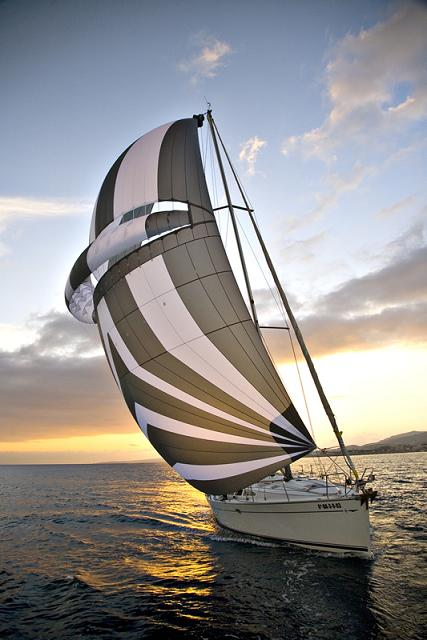
Parasail on a Sun Odyssey 43

The Parasailor and Parasail are patented and trademarked variants of a spinnaker sail for yachts. They were designed for cruising couples and short-handed crews and are considered to be easy to handle and well tempered. These sails make it possible to use one sail as spinnaker and Gennaker. These sails can be used between 70 and 180 degrees to the wind. Relieving the pressure on the bow and the stabilizing effect of the Parasailor and Parasail improve the effect of the rudder and decrease the rudder throws needed.

The Parasailor has a double-layer wing which inflates as the wind fills the sail. This acts like a soft batten, holding the sail out and actively re-opening the collapsed leech. The wing generates a lift that raises the bow of the boat, and also ensures that there is no loss of propulsion. Thanks to this lift, any yawing by the boat is prevented, making a much more comfortable ride. Even if the Parasailor has collapsed after a sudden strong wind shift, the spreading movement of the wing supports the re-opening once the wind has shifted back again.

== Parasail ==
The Parasail was developed as a variant of the Parasailor and is meant to be used in light winds. With a claimed minimal tendency to roll, it is said to be ideal for small crews. It can be used with a spinnaker pole, but it's not necessary. The Parasail has a single-skinned wing as opposed to the double-layer wing of the Parasailor.

== Parasailor and Parasail Compared ==
	Parasailor	Parasail
Boat Size	From Approx. 30 ft	Approx. 22 – 32 ft
Wing Type	Volume Wing (3D)	Single Skin Wing (2D)
Intrinsic Stability	Very High	High
Minimum Wind Speed	5 kts	3 kts
Works on Autopilot	Yes	Yes
Spinnaker Pole Required	No (but possible)	No (but possible)

== Wing Technology ==
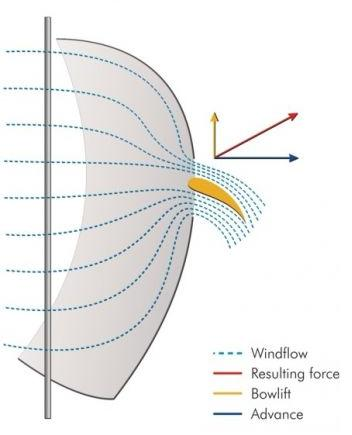
Wing Technology

A tailwind fills the sail and propels the yacht forward. Part of the pressure escapes through the opening in the sail behind which the wing has been fitted in such a way that the air flows past, above and below it. Thanks to the shape of the wing and the angle at which the air flows towards it (with the angle optimized for efficiency), the air on the upper surface of the wing accelerates faster than the air flowing over the lower surface. The resultant increase in pressure on the lower surface compared to the upper surface causes the wing to lift, helping to stabilize the sail.
