= Iain Murray (sailor) =

Australian sailor

Iain Murray AM
Personal information
- Nationality: Australian
- Born: 14 April 1958 (age 68) Sydney, New South Wales, Australia

Sailing career
- Sport: Sailing
- Class(es): Cherub, Etchells, 12-Metre Class, Star, 5O5

Iain Murray AM (born 14 April 1958) is an Australian sailor and yacht designer

Murray is known for his success in the 18 ft skiff class, appearances in 12-Metre Class yachts in the 1983 and 1987 America's Cup regattas, innovation in yacht design, management of the 2013 and 2017 America's Cup and global SailGP and for winning a second World Championship in the Etchells class 35 years after the first.

== Sailing career ==
Murray started sailing in Flying Ant class dinghies at the age of nine. His first major event win was at the 1973 Australian Cherub Championships at the age of fourteen in a boat he had designed and built himself at the age of twelve.

He won regattas including 6 consecutive 18 foot skiff World Championships, leading to his appearances in 12-Metre Class yachts in the America's Cup regattas, and then for his long-standing involvement with the Sydney to Hobart Yacht Race. This includes 26 races, and three overall victories, one as a designer, builder and skipper of Bumblebee 5 in 2001. A 14-year association as tactician and helmsman on super maxi Wild Oats X1 contributed to nine Line Honours victories. For the 2022 Rolex Sydney to Hobart, Murray is sailing master on rival supermaxi Andoo Comanche.

=== Olympic career ===
He represented Australia in Sailing at the 2008 Summer Olympics in Beijing, raced the Olympic Star class keelboat. In the 2020 Tokyo Summer Olympics, alongside Victor Kovalenko, he managed the Australian Olympic Men's 470 team of Mat Belcher and Will Ryan to gold-medal victory.

=== Sailing awards ===
Murray won the 18 ft skiff world title, the JJ Giltinan International Trophy, for six consecutive years from 1977 to 1982.

He was recognised as the Australian Yachtsmen of the Year in 1984. In the same year he won the World Etchells championship held in Sydney, a title he won again in Corpus Christi, Texas in 2019 with Colin Beashel and Richard Allanson. He was awarded Royal Sydney Yacht Squadron Yachtsman of the Year in 2020.

In 2023, Murray was inducted to the Australian Sailing Hall of Fame

=== Boat design ===
Murray developed the Nippa 2.65m dinghy for children, and also in partnership with Ian Burns and Andy Dovell, designed the Murray 41, the Sydney 36, 38 and 46, the Magic 25 and classic motor boats such as Cambria 11 and Oscar all built by Azzura Yachts.

== America's Cup ==
=== Racing ===
In the 1983 America's Cup challenge at Newport, Rhode Island, Murray sailed on Syd Fischer's Advance. Australia II went on to win the Cup and bring it to Australia. Murray joined Kevin Parry's Taskforce '87 syndicate and co-designed and skippered their Kookaburra yachts. Kookaburra III won the defender elimination trials against three other Australian syndicates including Alan Bond's Australia 111, off Fremantle.

Racing contracts prevented the winning syndicate from amending a boat to meet the waterline length of the American contender Stars & Stripes 87, rendering a proper defense unachievable and resulting in a four nil defeat.

=== Management ===
He was Regatta Director for the 34th America's Cup in 2013, 35th America's Cup in 2017, and 36th America's Cup in 2021, 37th America's Cup in 2024 and CEO of America's Cup Race Management. He is the Regatta Director for SailGP since its inception in 2018.
