= Tocker =

Tocker is a surname. Notable people with the surname include:

- Annie Constance Tocker (1889–1980), New Zealand librarian, Methodist deaconess, nurse and child welfare officer
- Mahinārangi Tocker (1955–2008), New Zealand singer-songwriter
- Mary Ann Tocker (1778–1853), was the first woman in Cornwall to be tried for Libel and was celebrated as the first woman to act as her own advocate in a British court of law
