= Julian Bethwaite =

Australian sailboat designer

- Occupations: Yacht designer Bethwaite Design
- Years active: 1971–present

Julian Bethwaite (born 14 July 1957) is an Australian, Sydney-based skiff sailor and sailboat designer. He wrote one chapter of his father Frank's book, Higher Performance Sailing.

== Sailboat designs ==
In 1980 based on a stretched Tasar Dinghy hull, he designed the first of the trilogy of Prime Computer 18 ft skiffs. It had a crew of two rather than the usual three which made sailing the boat difficult when handling the spinnaker pole and its complex wire bracing. It was this complexity that made Bethwaite design the Prime Mk2 with a fixed bowsprit and asymmetric spinnaker. To keep the weight down, the hull was made of balsa wood and weighed just 130 pounds (60 kg).

Prime Mk3 was also made of balsa wood, had a wingspan of 26 ft, and weighed just 99 pounds (45 kg). This was later used to make a plug for the standardized B18 class.

In 1994, Bethwaite designed the 49er which was a new high performance skiff. In 1996, it was one of 15 entries considered by the ISAF selection competition for the upcoming 2000 Sydney Olympics. The Olympic committee selected the 49er. From the 2000 Olympics and onwards, the 49er sailed with country flag designs covering the entire spinnaker, making it clear which boat was which.

In 1998, the smaller 29er was designed for the international youth market. The 29er has been given International Class status In 2004, he worked with Martin Billoch and Chris Mitchell to design the SKUD 18, a ballasted skiff for disabled sailors. From 2008 through 2016 this boat has been raced at the Paralympic Games.

In 2012, ISAF held trials for a women's high performance boat to race at the Olympics. Bethwaite submitted the 29erXX, a souped up 29er with bigger sails. Although this boat lost out, the winning entry, the 49erFX from Mackay Boats (which developed a new mast and suit of sails) does feature Bethwaite's 49er hull.

== Design process – the domino effect ==
In 1980, Julian started skiff designs that included three two-handed Prime Computers designs that pioneered the asymmetric spinnaker system.

== Awards ==
- 1999 awarded the Royal Institution of Naval Architects Award for Outstanding Achievement in Small Boat Design (for the 29er and 49er).
- SeaHorse award for innovation and safety for KeyBall trapeze system developed with Allen Brothers.
