= New England Intercollegiate Sailing Association =

Intercollegiate sailing conference

- Conference: ICSA
- Founded: 1949
- Commissioner: Justin Assad
- No. of teams: 42
- Region: Maine; Vermont; New Hampshire; Massachusetts; Rhode Island; Connecticut; Quebec
- Official website: neisa.collegesailing.org

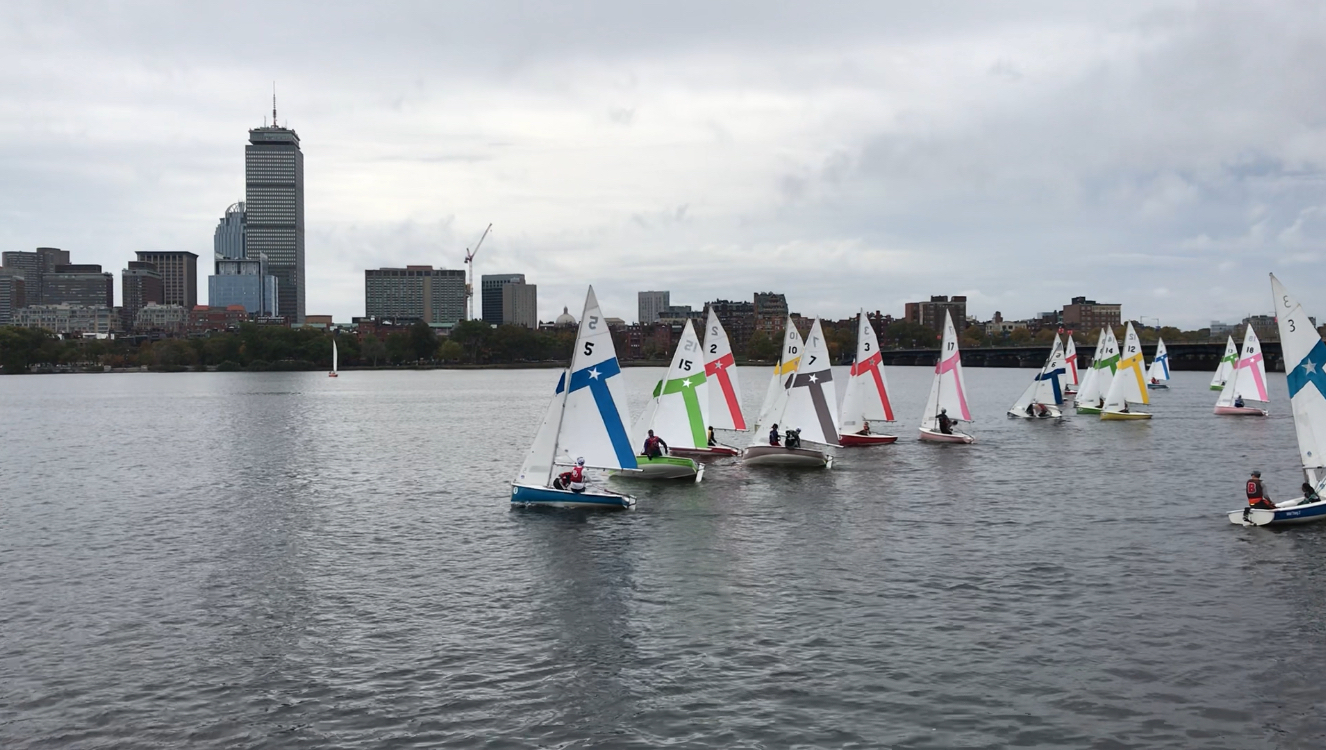
NEISA regatta held in fleet of MIT Fire Fly Dinghies on the Charles River

The New England Intercollegiate Sailing Association (NEISA) is one of the seven conferences affiliated with the Inter-Collegiate Sailing Association (ICSA) that schedule and administer regattas within their established geographic regions.

NEISA is one of the oldest and largest conferences, organizing intercollegiate sailing in New England, which includes 42 member schools including club teams and varsity programs. All conferences host their own 6 conference championships every year and gain berths to the corresponding national championships based on conference size. NEISA is managed by an executive board run primarily by student volunteers and team coaches.

== History ==
The New England Intercollegiate Sailing Association was founded in Cambridge, Massachusetts on March 26, 1949. This group of initially 21 teams joined with the Middle Atlantic Intercollegiate Sailing Association, and later the Midwest College Sailing Association and Pacific Coast Intercollegiate Yacht Racing Association to form the Intercollegiate Yacht Racing Association of North America. This Association worked to standardize rules and create entry and eligibility regulations, as well as broaden the scope of its competitions. From the beginning of college sailing, all regattas have been sailed in the host school's fleet of boats. Early on there was little consistency in the type of boat across different parts of the country and even between neighboring schools. Over time however, many schools have transitioned from various single-sail dinghies to use more durable and faster two-sail boats such as the FJ and Club 420.

== Members ==
- Amherst College
- Bates College
- Bentley University
- Boston College
- Boston University
- Bowdoin College
- Brandeis University
- Brown University
- Connecticut College
- Dartmouth College
- Emmanuel College
- Fairfield University
- Harvard University
- Johnson and Wales University
- Maine Maritime Academy
- Massachusetts Institute of Technology
- Massachusetts Maritime Academy
- McGill University
- Middlebury College
- Northeastern University (Boston, Massachusetts)
- Olin College of Engineering
- Providence College
- Roger Williams University
- Sacred Heart University
- Salve Regina University
- Tufts University
- United States Coast Guard Academy
- University of Connecticut
- University of Maine
- University of Massachusetts Amherst
- University of Massachusetts Boston
- University of Massachusetts Dartmouth
- University of New England (United States)
- University of New Hampshire
- University of Rhode Island
- University of Vermont
- Wellesley College
- Wentworth Institute of Technology
- Wesleyan University
- Williams College
- Worcester Polytechnic Institute
- Yale University

== Leadership ==
NEISA is largely run and regulated by in-conference coaches and sailors. Members of the Executive Committee are elected annually at the NEISA Annual Meeting held late Fall. There is currently no term-limit for Executive Committee members. As of Spring, 2019 the Executive Committee was as follows.

Commissioner	Frank Pizzo (2024)	Bowdoin College
President	Kevin Coakley '17	Harvard University
Vice President	Walter Florio	Connecticut College
Secretary	Charlie Welsh '17	Boston University
Treasurer	Alden Reid	Boston College
Schedule Coordinator	Carter Brock ‘22 (2024)	Northeastern University
Northern Regional Director	Diana Weidenbacker	University of New Hampshire
Central Regional Director	Mike OConnor	Harvard University
Southern Regional Director	John Mollicone	Brown University
Director of Boats & Safety	Fran Charles	Massachusetts Institute of Technology
Director of Special Projects	Brian Swingly	U.S. Coast Guard Academy
Northern Regional Representative	Casey Astiz	Middlebury College
Central Regional Representative	Tyler Paige	Tufts University
Southern Regional Representative	Sarah Morin	University of Rhode Island
At Large Representative/Social Media Chair	Ally Schwerdtfeger	Bentley University
At Large Representative/Scheduling Assistant	Peter Lynn	Boston College

== Championships ==
NEISA runs and hosts six in-conference championships, as well as sends teams to national championship events managed by the Inter-Collegiate Sailing Association.

=== In-conference Championships ===
For Coed teams, these in-conference championships include:

- Coed Dinghy Fleet Racing, NEISA Coed Championship/ US Coast Guard Alumni Bowl
- Men's Single-Handed Fleet Racing, NEISA Men's Singlehanded Championships
- Coed Team Racing, New England Team Race Championship/ Fowle Trophy
- Coed Match Racing, NEISA Match Race Champs/ Larry White Trophy

For Women's teams, these in-conference championships include:

- Women's Dinghy Fleet Racing, NEISA Women's Championship/ Reed Trophy
- Women's Single-Handed Fleet Racing, NEISA Women's Singlehanded Championships

=== National Championships ===
For full article on national sailing championships, see Inter-Collegiate Sailing Association National Championships

The number of berths NEISA teams are given to national championships depend on the event and are determined by ICSA at the beginning of every Year. As NEISA is one of the largest conferences, it is annually given more berths than the smaller conferences. The representing teams from NEISA are determined by the corresponding In-Conference Championships.

These national championships include:

- Coed Dinghy Fleet Racing, Gill Coed National Championships/ Henry A. Morss Memorial Trophy
- Men's Single-Handed Fleet Racing, Laser Performance Men's Singlehanded Nationals/Glen S. Foster Trophy
- Coed Team Racing, LaserPerformance Team Race National Championship/ Walter Cromwell Wood Bowl
- Coed Match Racing, ICSA Match Race Nationals/ Cornelius Shields Sr. Trophy
- Women's Dinghy Fleet Racing, Sperry Women's National Championship/ Gerald C. Miller Trophy
- Women's Single-Handed Fleet Racing, Laser Performance Women's Singlehanded Nationals/ Janet Lutz Trophy

== Results and Rankings ==
Since 2008, Inter-collegiate racing results are documented using College Sailing Techscore, a website which records live race results for current regattas, as well as documents past seasons. NEISA also creates in-conference team rankings every Fall based on the best regatta results of each team and the relative difficulty/ size of the regattas those results came from. A team's score is calculated by summing their top 5 scoring regattas and also their score at the New England Fall Championships. These scores are compiled to rank all participating teams. Teams that are not listed on the rankings did not sail a scored regatta during that Season.

Coed Team End-of-Season Rankings by Year
Rank	Fall 2013	Fall 2014	Fall 2015	Fall 2016	Fall 2017	Fall 2018
1st	Yale University	Yale University	Boston College	Yale University	Yale University	Yale University
2nd	Boston College	Dartmouth College	Yale University	Tufts University	Dartmouth College	Harvard University
3rd	Harvard University	Boston College	Harvard University	Dartmouth College	Roger Williams University	Bowdoin College
4th	Dartmouth College	Tufts University	Coast Guard Academy	Boston College	Massachusetts Institute of Technology	Dartmouth College
5th	Roger Williams University	Roger Williams University	Boston University	Massachusetts Institute of Technology	Boston University	Roger Williams University
6th	Tufts University	Harvard University	Dartmouth College	Bowdoin College	Tufts University	Boston College
7th	Brown University	Brown University	Massachusetts Institute of Technology	Boston University	Boston College	Brown University
8th	Connecticut College	Massachusetts Institute of Technology	Roger Williams University	Coast Guard Academy	Harvard University	Boston University
9th	University of Vermont	University of Vermont	Brown University	Roger Williams University	Brown University	Massachusetts Institute of Technology
10th	Coast Guard Academy	Coast Guard Academy	Bowdoin College	Harvard	Bowdoin College	Tufts University
11th	Boston University	Boston University	Tufts University	Brown University	Connecticut College	University of Rhode Island
12th	Massachusetts Institute of Technology	Bowdoin College	University of Rhode Island	University of Rhode Island	Coast Guard Academy	Coast Guard Academy
13th	Bowdoin College	University of Rhode Island	Connecticut College	Connecticut College	University of Rhode Island	Connecticut College
14th	Northeastern University	Connecticut College	University of Vermont	University of Vermont	Salve Regina University	University of Vermont
15th	University of Rhode Island	Northeastern University	Northeastern University	Northeastern University	Northeastern University	Northeastern University
16th	Salve Regina University	Salve Regina University	Salve Regina University	McGill University	University of Vermont	Salve Regina University
17th	Massachusetts Maritime Academy	University of Connecticut	Johnson and Wales University	Salve Regina University	University of New Hampshire	Massachusetts Maritime Academy
18th	Bates College	McGill University	University of Connecticut	Massachusetts Maritime Academy	Massachusetts Maritime Academy	Maine Maritime Academy
19th	University of New Hampshire	Massachusetts Maritime Academy	Massachusetts Maritime Academy	Middlebury College	McGill University	Bates College
20th	McGill University	University of New Hampshire	McGill University	Johnson and Wales University	Bates College	McGill University
21st	Middlebury College	Middlebury College	Bates College	University of New Hampshire	Middlebury College	University of Massachusetts/Amherst
22nd	Providence College	Johnson and Wales University	Middlebury College	Maine Maritime Academy	University of Massachusetts/Amherst	Middlebury College
23rd	University of Connecticut	Bates College	University of New Hampshire	Bates College	Maine Maritime Academy	Wentworth
24th	Holy Cross College	Wesleyan	Providence College	University of Connecticut	University of Connecticut	Bentley University
25th	Maine Maritime Academy	Amherst	Wesleyan	Wesleyan	Johnson and Wales University	Johnson and Wales University
26th	Johnson and Wales University	Worcester Polytechnical Institute	Sacred Heart University	University of Massachusetts/Amherst	Wesleyan	University of Connecticut
27th	Wesleyan	Sacred Heart University	University of Massachusetts/Amherst	Providence College	Fairfield University	Emmanuel College
28th	Williams College	Providence College	Wentworth	Worcester Polytechnical Institute	Bentley College	Fairfield University
29th	Amherst	University of Massachusetts/Dartmouth	University of Massachusetts/Dartmouth	Sacred Heart University	Providence College	Providence College
30th	Bentley College	Maine Maritime Academy	Worcester Polytechnical Institute	Bentley College	University of Massachusetts/Dartmouth	Sacred Heart University
31st	Sacred Heart University	Holy Cross College	Wellesley College	Fairfield University	Worcester Polytechnical Institute	University of Massachusetts/Dartmouth
32nd	Trinity	Fairfield University	Brandeis University	University of Massachusetts/Dartmouth	Sacred Heart University	University of New Hampshire
33rd	Brandeis University	Williams College	Maine Maritime Academy	Emmanuel College	Amherst College	Wellesley College
34th	Mitchell College	Wellesley College	Fairfield University	Wellesley College	Williams College	Wesleyan
35th	University of Massachusetts/Dartmouth	Brandeis University	Emmanuel College		Emmanuel College	Williams
36th	Wellesley College	Bentley College	Williams College			Worcester Polytechnical Institute
37th	Worcester Polytechnical Institute	Colleges of the Fenway	Holy Cross College			
38th		Mitchell College	University of New England			

Women's Team End-of-Season Rankings by Year
Rank	Fall 2013	Fall 2014	Fall 2015	Fall 2016	Fall 2017	Fall 2018
1st	Yale University	Boston College	University of Rhode Island	Yale University	Coast Guard Academy	Brown University
2nd	Dartmouth College	Yale University	Coast Guard Academy	Boston College	Yale University	Yale University
3rd	Boston College	Coast Guard Academy	Bowdoin College	University of Rhode Island	Brown University	Massachusetts Institute of Technology
4th	Brown University	Brown University	Yale University	Brown University	Boston College	Dartmouth College
5th	Massachusetts Institute of Technology	Bowdoin College	Dartmouth College	Boston University	Dartmouth College	Boston College
6th	Coast Guard Academy	University of Vermont	Tufts University	Coast Guard Academy	Connecticut College	Boston University
7th	University of Rhode Island	Massachusetts Institute of Technology	Boston University	Harvard	Boston University	University of Rhode Island
8th	Bowdoin College	Dartmouth College	University of Vermont	University of Vermont	Massachusetts Institute of Technology	Harvard
9th	Roger Williams University	University of Rhode Island	Boston College	Connecticut College	University of Rhode Island	Tufts University
10th	University of Vermont	Connecticut College	Brown University	Tufts University	Tufts University	Bowdoin College
11th	Boston University	Tufts University	Connecticut College	Dartmouth College	Harvard University	Coast Guard Academy
12th	Harvard University	Harvard University	Northeastern University	Roger Williams University	University of Vermont	Northeastern University
13th	Connecticut College	Boston University	Harvard University	Massachusetts Institute of Technology	Northeastern University	University of Vermont
14th	Tufts University	Northeastern University	Roger Williams University	Northeastern University	Bowdoin College	Roger Williams University
15th	Northeastern University	Roger Williams University	Massachusetts Institute of Technology	Bowdoin College	Roger Williams University	Connecticut College
16th	Salve Regina University	Massachusetts Maritime Academy	University of New Hampshire	Fairfield University	Salve Regina University	Salve Regina University
17th	Middlebury College	Middlebury College				
18th	Massachusetts Maritime Academy	Salve Regina University				
19th	University of Connecticut					
20th	University of Massachusetts/Dartmouth					
