= Katie McDowell =

American sailor

Katherine E. McDowell
Personal information
- Nickname: Katie
- Born: 20 September 1975 (age 50)

Sailing career
- Sport: Sailing
- College team: Tufts University; Brown University

Katherine E. McDowell is an American sailor who sailed with Isabelle Kinsolving to take fifth place in the women's 470 class competition at the 2004 Summer Olympics.

== Sailing history ==
McDowell started sailing at age nine in sunfish and went on to sail in high school at the Moses Brown School where she graduated in 1993. McDowell started sailing in college at Tufts University and then transferred to Brown University where she led the team that won the Women's College Nationals Championship in 1998. McDowell was named to the Women All-American sailing team in 1994, 1995, and 1996 while sailing at Tufts University and then in 1997 and 1998 while sailing at Brown University; in 1997 she was also named to a Co-ed All American sailor. She won the ICSA Women's Singlehanded National Championship in 1996.

In the 2004 Olympics held in Athens, McDowell sailed with Isabelle Kinsolving in the 470 class where they finished in fifth place.

== Awards ==
In 2006, McDowell was inducted into the Hall of Fame at the Moses Brown School. When 2014, McDowell was inducted in the Brown Athletic Hall of Fame in 2014, she became the first women's sailor to receive this honor.
