= Texas Longhorns sailing =

Texas sailing team

University of Texas Sailing Team
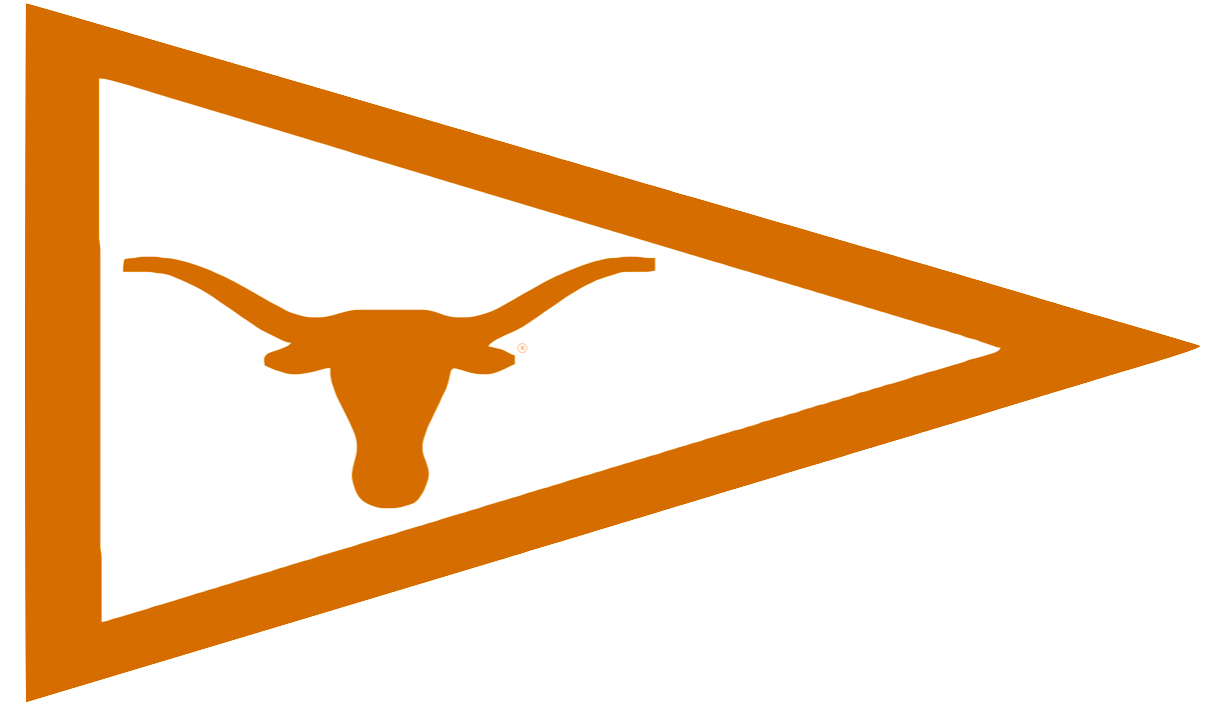
- Burgee of UTST
- Founded: 1968
- University: University of Texas at Austin
- Conference: SEISA
- Venue: Austin Yacht Club
- Area of Competition: Lake Travis
- Nickname: Longhorns
- Colors: Burnt Orange and White

The University of Texas Sailing Team (UT Sailing Team, UTST, or Texas Sailing) is a nationally competitive club sports team at the University of Texas at Austin. Their goal is to expand the love and knowledge of competitive sailing throughout the university community and their conference at large.

The club encourages participation from all undergraduate students at UT, regardless of experience although the club also recruits students with high school sailing experience. Each fall and spring Texas Sailing fields competitive coed and women's teams in the Southeastern Intercollegiate Sailing Association district of the Intercollegiate Sailing Association, travelling around the country to race in intercollegiate regattas. The club also hosts two or more regattas annually, as well as an annual Alumni Regatta.

The team is governed by a board of student officers.

== National championships ==
Texas holds 4 National Championships

- The team won the Team Racing National Championship in 1973 with SEISA.
- Kelson Elam, Kelly Gough and Scott Young won the Sloop National Championship in 1979.
- Scott Young, David Chapin and Mark Hallman won the Sloop National Championship in 1981.
- Bruce Mahoney won the Men's Singlehanded National Championship in 2001.

== Sailors ==
Paul Foerster competed at four Olympic Games in sailing: 1988, 1992, 2000, and 2004, winning a total of three Olympic medals.

== Sailing venue ==
The University of Texas Sailing Team sails out of the Austin Yacht Club on Lake Travis.

== Fleet ==
The fleet of the UT Sailing Team includes 18 Zim 420Es and 10 Vanguard Flying Juniors (FJs).

== History ==
The UT Sailing Team began in the late 1960s, probably 1968; however the actual year is the subject of some debate. It began as a club for students to go and sail at the Austin Yacht Club. Not long after its inception the team split into two distinct groups, the Sailing Club, a more casual non-competitive faction and the Sailing Team. After the split the Team moved rapidly to become a major player in college sailing.
