= ICSA Match Racing National Championship =

The ICSA Team Racing National Championship is one of the seven Inter-Collegiate Sailing Association National Championships. Between 1972 and 2009, it was called the Sloop Championship; however, it changed its name in 2010 when the racing format was changed to match racing.

Winners are awarded the Cornelius Shields Sr. Trophy.

== Champions ==
Year	Champion	Team members
1972	University of Michigan	Bruce Nelson, Irene Dabanian, Thomas Ehman
1973	State University of New York Maritime College	Robert Martus, Gary Jobson, Jack McAllister
1974	Tulane University	Toby Darden, Dan Hash, Doug Brod, Jim Kinsey
1975	University of Southern California	Benny Mitchell, Curt Olsen, Gordo Johnson
1976	University of California, Santa Cruz	Robert Wade, Jane Ellis, Dougall Johnson, Thomas Walsh
1977	United States Naval Academy	Gar Wright, Paul Van Cleve, Doug Keiler
1978	United States Naval Academy	Gerard Coleman, Bill Cavitt, Rich Fitzpatrick
1979	University of Texas at Austin	Kelson Elam, Kelly Gough and Scott Young
1980	University of California, Irvine	Tracy Usher, Seth Morrell, Rick Matzinger
1981	University of Texas at Austin	Scott Young, David Chapin, Mark Hallman
1982	Boston University	Kenneth Read, Andy Ivey, Jim Alman, Todd Johnston
1983	United States Naval Academy	Robbie Brown, Rick Merriman, Brian Ledbetter
1984	University of California, Santa Barbara	Michael Polkabla, Chris Perkins, Ken Monroe, Scott Dierdorff
1985	University of Washington	Charles McKee, Jack Christiansen, Hank Hollenbaugh, John Stanley
1986	Spring Hill College	Scott Sonnier, William Christman, Jefferson Bell
1987	United States Naval Academy	Robert Hallawell, Peter Limoge, Robert Cady
1988	Connecticut College	Peter Johnstone, James Appel, Johnathon Pudney, Devon Coughlin
1989	Old Dominion University	Terry Hutchinson, Mitch Brindley, Mike Devlin, Mike Tamulaites
1990	Old Dominion University	Terry Hutchinson, Mike Devlin, Michael Sarnowski
1991	College of Charleston	Andy Lovell, Jay Miles, Bill Barrett, Jeff Irvine
1992	College of Charleston	Andy Lovell, Jay Miles, Cain Goettelman
1993	Old Dominion University	Patrick Downey, Greg Enos, Fred Sage, Christian Obenshain
1994	St. Mary's College of Maryland	Tim Healy, Bob Oberg, Tucker Thompson
1995	United States Naval Academy	Ryan Cox, Carl Smit, Nick Cromwell, Walter Allman
1996	United States Naval Academy	R.D. Burley, Dean Balcirak, Joe Buczkowski
1997	Boston University	Tim Wadlow, Robbie Dean, Nick Parks
1998	United States Merchant Marine Academy	Bill Hardesty, Ken Wolfe, Eric Metz
1999	College of Charleston	David Dabney, Eric Knight, Joe Pitcavage
2000	United States Merchant Marine Academy	Allan Terhune Jr., Eric Metz, Casey Williams, Matt Schubert
2001	Harvard University	Sean Doyle, Cardwell Potts, Dan Litchfield, Michelle Yu
2002	Harvard University	Sean Doyle, Cardwell Potts, Dan Litchfield
2003	College of Charleston	D. Blouin, J. Bowden, B. Dabney, B. Kimbrough
2004	United States Merchant Marine Academy	Peter Must, Hugh Grandstaff, Austin Howell
2005	Texas A&M University at Galveston	Scott Stanton, Brad Winslett, Andrew McInnes
2006	University of California, Irvine	Frank Tybor, Chris Trezzo, William Pochereva
2007	College of Charleston	Russell O’Reilly, Chris Lash, Brendan Healy
2008	St. Mary's College of Maryland	John Loe, Valen Smith, Frederick Vranizan
2009	University of South Florida	Mitchell Hall, Timothy King, Simon Sanders, Darby Smith, David Weaks
2010	Boston College	Taylor Canfield, Christian Manchester, Jonathan Lutz, Christopher Protasewich
2011	Boston College	Taylor Canfield, Danny Bloomstine, Ryan Mullins, Briana Provancha, Tyler Sinks, David Grosso
2012	United States Naval Academy	Jason Carminati, Taylor Vann, Killian Corbishley
2013	Tufts University	Will Haeger, Paula Grasberger, Solomon Krevans, David Liebenberg
2014	Georgetown University	Nevin Snow, AJ Reiter, Alexander Post, Katia DaSilva
2015	Georgetown University	Nevin Snow, AJ Reiter, Alexander Post, Katia DaSilva
2016	College of Charleston	Christophe Killian, Rebekah Schiff, Jake Reynolds, Reed Baldridge
2017	Boston College	Charles Sinks, Wade Waddell, Peter Lynn, Tara Ferraris
2018	Boston College	Wade Waddell, Tara Ferraris, Jack DeNatale, Peter Lynn
2019	Stanford University	Jack Parkin, Wiley Rogers, Jacob Rosenberg, Victoria Thompson
2020	Not held	
2021	Yale University	Jack Egan, Christophe Chaumont, Nicholas Davies, Megan Grimes
2022	Yale University	Jack Egan, Christophe Chaumont, Nicholas Davies, Megan Grimes
2023	Brown University	Liam O'Keefe, Charlotte Costikyan, Guthrie Braun, Camren Spriggs
2024	Boston College	Michael Kirkman, Peter Busch, Sophia Hacket, Peter Joslin
2025	Harvard University	Justin Callahan, Mitchell Callahan, Harrison Strom, Kate Danielson
