= ICSA Women's Dinghy National Championship =

ICSA Women's Dinghy National Championship is one of the seven Inter-Collegiate Sailing Association National Championships.

Winners are awarded the Gerald C. Miller Trophy. Second place team receives the Nancy Kleckner Trophy and third place team receives the Ann Campbell Trophy.

== Champions ==
Year	Champion	Team members
1967	Wilson College (Pennsylvania)	
1968	Radcliffe College	
1969	Radcliffe College	
1970	Radcliffe College	
1971	Massachusetts Institute of Technology	
1972	Radcliffe College	
1973	Massachusetts Institute of Technology	
1974	Princeton University	
1975	Princeton University	
1976	Princeton University	
1977	Princeton University	
1978	University of California, Berkeley	
1979	United States Naval Academy	
1980	United States Naval Academy	
1981	United States Naval Academy	
1982	Old Dominion University	
1983	United States Naval Academy	
1984	Tufts University	
1985	Brown University	
1986	Tufts University	
1987	Old Dominion University	
1988	Brown University	
1989	Brown University	
1990	Tufts University	
1991	United States Naval Academy	
1992	Dartmouth College	
1993	Tufts University	
1994	Tufts University	
1995	St. Mary's College of Maryland	
1996	Tufts University	
1997	United States Naval Academy	
1998	Brown University	
1999	Tufts University	
2000	Dartmouth College	
2001	University of Hawaii at Manoa	Molly O'Bryan, Melody Torres, Sarah Hitchcock, Renee DeCurtis, Jennifer Warnock, Marin Diskant
2002	Old Dominion University	Sally Barkow, Cara Gibbons-Neff, Deborah Capozzi, Corrie Clement, Liz Bower, Anna Tunnicliffe
2003	Tufts University	
2004	Yale University	Molly Carapiet '06, Jenn Hoyle '05, Emily Hill '07, Megan Pearl '06, Julie Papanek '05, Sarah Himmelfarb '06
2005	Harvard University	
2006	College of Charleston	Alana O'Reilly, Susan Lintern, Andrea Savage, Megan Riddle, Danielle Neri, Julia Southworth
2007	St. Mary's College of Maryland	
2008	Boston College	
2009	Yale University	Jane Macky, Marla Menninger, Katherine Hagemann, Sarah Lihan, Elizabeth Brim, Rebecca Jackson, Grace Becton
2010	College of Charleston	Allison Blecher, Alyssa Aitken, Shannon Heausler, Rebecca Bestoso
2011	University of Rhode Island	Amy Hawkins, Caroline Hall, Chanel Miller, Danielle Fougere
2012	Boston College	Anne Haeger, Laura McKenna, Kelly Roy, Briana Provancha, Elizabeth Barnard
2013	Dartmouth College	Deirdre Lambert, Carissa Crawford, Kelsey Wheeler, Chandler Salisbury, Lizzie Guynn, Madilyn Gamble
2014	Dartmouth College	Deirdre Lambert, Avery Plough, Kelsey Wheeler, Lizzie Guynn
2015	Yale University	Morgan Kiss, Emily Johnson, Claire Huebner, Casey Klingler, Katherine Gaumond
2016	United States Coast Guard Academy	Nikole Barnes, Anna Morin, Dana Rohde, Hannah Herring
2017	Yale University	Casey Klingler, Natalya Doris, Christine Klingler, Louisa Nordstrom, Claire Huebner, Isabelle Rossi De Leon
2018	Boston College	Isabella Loosbrock, Emma Perry, Sophia Reineke, Megan Bamford, Lily McGrath
2019	Brown University	Ragna Agerup, Madeleine McGrath, Maxine De Havenon, Emma Montgomery, Hannah Steadman, Annabelle Hutchinson, Sophie Hibben, Emma Montgomery, Maxine De Havenon, Rachel Foster, Emily Ito, Abigayle Konys, Megha Malpani
2021	College of Charleston	Paris Henken, Lucy Klempen, Marian Williams, Roxanne Snyder
2022	Boston College	Sophia Reineke, Laura Ferraris, Sara Schumann, Colleen O’Brien, Lilly Mathieu, Michaela O’Brien
2023	Stanford University	Michelle Lahrkamp, Sophie Fisher, Patricia Gerli, Ellie Harned, Vanessa Lahrkamp, Grace Austin, Abigail Tindall, Hannah Freeman
2024	Stanford University	Vanessa Lahrkamp, Gwendolyn Donahue, Michelle Lahrkamp, Ellie Harned, Hannah Freeman, Alice Schmid
2025	Stanford University	Ellie Harned, Kit Harned, Sophie Fisher, Piper Blackband, Vanessa Lahrkamp, Alice Schmid
2026	Stanford University	Vanessa Lahrkamp, Callie Hammond, Sophie Fisher, Abby Baird, Piper Blackband, Alice Schmid, Avery Baldwin, Ellie Harned, Kit Harned, Amiya Stroumza
