= ICSA Men's Singlehanded National Championship =

ICSA Men's Singlehanded National Championship is one of the seven Inter-Collegiate Sailing Association National Championships.

Since 1963, the winner is awarded the Glen S. Foster Trophy, named after Glen Foster for his interest in collegiate sailing and devotion to singlehanded competition. Second place finisher receives the George Griswold Trophy.

The event is sailed in cat-rigged boats which have been designed for singlehanded sailing or which are adaptable to singlehanded sailing.

The winner of this Championship may be invited to sail in United States Singlehanded Championship for the George O’Day Trophy organized by US Sailing with partial fees to be paid by ICSA.

== Champions ==
| Year | Champion | Team |
|---|---|---|
| 1963 | Basil Twist Jr. | Stanford University |
| 1964 | Steven C. Martin | United States Coast Guard Academy |
| 1965 | Robert H. Purrington | Princeton University |
| 1966 | Carl S. Van Duyne | Princeton University |
| 1967 | Henry Sprague III | University of Southern California |
| 1968 | Frederick V. Minson | United States Coast Guard Academy |
| 1969 | Thomas W. McLaughlin | San Diego State University |
| 1970 | Robert E. Doyle | Harvard University |
| 1971 | William L. Campbell | United States Naval Academy |
| 1972 | Gary A. Jobson | State University of New York Maritime College |
| 1973 | Gary A. Jobson | State University of New York Maritime College |
| 1974 | Augustin G. Diaz | Tulane University |
| 1975 | Roger W. Altreuter | Tufts University |
| 1976 | James B. McCreary | Tufts University |
| 1977 | William C. Buchan | University of Washington |
| 1978 | Paul M. Van Cleve | United States Naval Academy |
| 1979 | Alexander Smigelski Jr. | United States Merchant Marine Academy |
| 1980 | R. Stuart Johnstone | Tufts University |
| 1981 | Robert G. Anoll | United States Naval Academy |
| 1982 | Thomas A. Lihan | United States Merchant Marine Academy |
| 1983 | Scott J. MacLeod | Tulane University |
| 1984 | Brain R. Ledbetter | United States Naval Academy |
| 1985 | Scott J. MacLeod | Tulane University |
| 1986 | Alexander C. Cutler | United States Naval Academy |
| 1987 | Alexander C. Cutler | United States Naval Academy |
| 1988 | Christopher B. Larson | College of Charleston |
| 1989 | Michael M. Martin | Old Dominion University |
| 1990 | Morgan W. Larson | College of Charleston |
| 1991 | Willis A. Lovell | College of Charleston |
| 1992 | Bradley M. Rodi | United States Naval Academy |
| 1993 | Mark Mendelblatt | Tufts University |
| 1994 | John Torgerson | Old Dominion University |
| 1995 | William A. Hardesty III | United States Merchant Marine Academy |
| 1996 | Senet Bischoff | Tufts University |
| 1997 | John Torgerson | Old Dominion University |
| 1998 | Marty Essig | Queen's University at Kingston |
| 1999 | Dalton Bergan | University of Southern California |
| 2000 | Oskar Johansson | Queen's University at Kingston |
| 2001 | Bruce Mahoney | University of Texas at Austin |
| 2002 | David Wright | United States Merchant Marine Academy |
| 2003 | Andrew W. Campbell | Georgetown University |
| 2004 | Vincent Porter | Harvard University |
| 2005 | Andrew W. Campbell | Georgetown University |
| 2006 | Andrew W. Campbell | Georgetown University |
| 2007 | Emery Wager | Stanford University |
| 2008 | Thomas Barrows | Yale University |
| 2009 | Cy C. Thompson | Roger Williams University |
| 2010 | Juan I. Maegli | College of Charleston |
| 2011 | Charles G. Buckingham | Georgetown University |
| 2012 | Cam Cullman | Yale University |
| 2013 | Juan I. Maegli | College of Charleston |
| 2014 | Greg Martinez | Georgetown University |
| 2015 | Stefano Peschiera | College of Charleston |
| 2016 | Malcolm Lamphere | Yale University |
| 2017 | Scott Rasmussen | Boston College |
| 2018 | Stefano Peschiera | College of Charleston |
| 2019 | Henry Marshall | Harvard University |
| 2020 | Leo Boucher | St. Mary's College of Maryland |
| 2021 | Thomas Ford McCann | Georgetown University |
| 2022 | Leo Boucher | St. Mary's College of Maryland |
| 2023 | Chapman Petersen | Stanford University |
| 2024 | Nicholas Reeser | United States Coast Guard Academy |
| 2025 | Daniel Escudero | Webb Institute |
| 2026 | Robby Meek | Harvard University |
