= Northwest Intercollegiate Sailing Association =

- Conference: ICSA
- Commissioner: Andrew Nelson (former commissioner)
- No. of teams: 8
- Region: Oregon; Washington; British Columbia
- Official website: nwicsa.collegesailing.org

The Northwest Intercollegiate Sailing Association (NWICSA) was one of seven conferences within the Intercollegiate Sailing Association (ICSA), the governing body for collegiate competition in the sport of sailing.

The NWICSA consisted of teams from colleges and universities in Oregon, Washington and British Columbia, Canada. It was dissolved in 2022, its teams were united with the Pacific Coast Collegiate Sailing Conference, and the ICSA moved to a six-conference model.

== Members ==
- Lewis and Clark College
- Oregon State University
- Portland State University
- University of British Columbia
- University of Oregon
- University of Victoria
- University of Washington
- Western Washington University
