= Lauderdale Yacht Club =

American private yacht club

- Burgee
- Short name: LYC
- Founded: 1938
- Location: 1725 SE 12th St., Fort Lauderdale, Florida 33316 US
- Website: www.lyc.org

Lauderdale Yacht Club is a private yacht club located in Fort Lauderdale, Florida, United States. The club belongs to the Florida Council of Yacht Clubs.

== History ==
LYC was established in June 1938.

== Racing ==
LYC is one of the six founding members of the Southern Ocean Racing Conference (SORC), being the St. Petersburg Yacht Club, Miami Yacht Club, Coral Reef Yacht Club, Biscayne Bay Yacht Club and Nassau Yacht Club the other five. The SORC was founded in 1965 to expand offshore racing after the Southern Ocean Racing Conference had been created in 1940 with the 184-mile Miami-Nassau Race, the 284-mile St. Petersburg-Havana Race, the 30-mile triangular Lipton Cup Race off Miami Beach, and a 90-mile Havana to Key West Regatta. LYC and SORC runs five Regattas today, together with the Storm Trysail Club, the Fort Lauderdale to Key West Race.

LYC hosts annually the Ron Payne Memorial Regatta in the Snipe class after renaming the annual former Snipe Ocean Regatta in 2004 to honor active member of the Snipe Class and the Lauderdale Yacht Club Ronald Bruce Payne.

== Sailors ==
Anna Tunnicliffe, Annie Haeger, Briana Provancha, Steve Benjamin, Peter Commette and Max Agnese are LYC members.
