= Stefano Peschiera =

Peruvian sailor

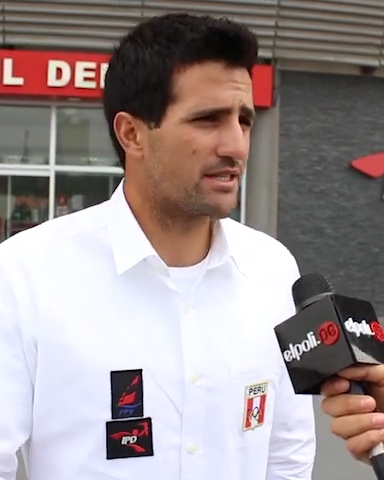
- Peschiera in 2018

Personal information
- Born: 16 January 1995 (age 31) Lima, Peru
- Height: 1.81 m (5 ft 11 in)

Sport
- Country: Peru
- Sport: Sailing
- Event(s): ILCA 7, ILCA 6, ILCA 4, Optimist
- College team: College of Charleston
- Club: Club de Regatas Lima
- Team: SP
- Turned pro: 5 June 2018
- Coached by: Luis Miguel Camino

Achievements and titles
- Olympic finals: 3
- World finals: 13
- Highest world ranking: 3
Medal record
Men's sailing
Representing Peru
Olympic Games
Bronze medal – third place	2024 Paris	Laser
Pan American Games
Gold medal – first place	2023 Santiago	Laser
South American Games
Gold medal – first place	2022 Asunción	Laser
South American Beach Games
Gold medal – first place	2019 Rosario	Laser
Bolivarian Games
Gold medal – first place	2017 Santa Marta	Laser
Gold medal – first place	2025 Lima-Ayacucho	Laser
Silver medal – second place	2013 Trujillo	Laser
Silver medal – second place	2022 Valledupar	Laser
Bolivarian Beach Games
Gold medal – first place	2014 Huanchaco	Laser
World Laser Championships (Under 21)
Bronze medal – third place	2014 Douarnenez	Laser

Stefano Peschiera (born 16 January 1995) is a Peruvian competitive sailor and Olympic medal winner. He won Peru's 5th medal in history after 32 years of Peru not getting a medal. He has been recognized with the Laureles Deportivos del Perú (Sports Laurels of Peru), the country's highest recognition to an athlete, and has been given the Peruvian Navy's Medal of Honor and the Medal of Honor in the grade of "Knight" from the Peruvian Congress.

He also won the gold medal at the Santiago 2023 Panamerican Games. He was named College Sailor of the Year by the US Naval Academy in 2018 sailing for College of Charleston. In 2018, he was recognized by the College of Charleston with the J. Steward Walker Cup, the highest award given by the athletics department and the Charleston Athletic Fund to that years' outstanding student-athlete (out of 500).

He is a three time Central and South American Champion (2019,2021,2024) in the ILCA 7 Olympic Class, a one time US Open winner (2020), and a World Circuit Stage Winner (2020). He has qualified for 15 medal races (finals) in World Circuit Events and was ranked 3rd in the World Rankings in Jun-Aug 2021.

2013 Bolivarian Games.

In 2022, he won the Peruvian Nationals in the Snipe class.

== College ==
He won the ICSA Men's Singlehanded National Championship twice, in 2015 and 2018, the ICSA Coed Dinghy National Championship in 2018, and the ICSA Team Racing National Championship in 2017 and 2018 sailing for the College of Charleston, and was named ICSA College Sailor of the Year in 2018.

== Olympic Games ==
He competed at the 2016 Summer Olympics in Rio de Janeiro, in the men's Laser class, after getting Peru the first out of the 9 berths offered at the Laser World Championship in Kingston, Canada. He is currently Ranked number 8 in the World Sailing Rankings and qualified for the Olympic Games in 2020 Summer Olympics in Tokyo. He represented Peru again in the Paris 2024 Olympics where he won the bronze medal in the men's Laser class.
