= Andrew Campbell (sailor) =

American yachtsman

Personal information
- Nationality: United States

Sailing career
- Sport: Sailing
- College team: Georgetown University
Medal record
Sailing
Representing United States
Pan American Games
Gold medal – first place	2007 Rio	Men's Laser

Andrew W. Campbell (born 3 February 1984 in Toms River, New Jersey) is an American yachtsman.

Raised in Toms River, New Jersey, Campbell first learned to sail as a child in Toms River with the Barnegat Bay Yacht Racing Association and moved to San Diego, California at the age of eight. Campbell sailed out of the San Diego Yacht Club, in the unusual design of the Naples Sabot, commonly used for junior programs on the West Coast. He attended the Bishop's School in La Jolla.

In the Snipe class, he was the 2001 District 6 Junior Champion. In the Star class he won the silver medal in the 2013 World Championship and the 2010 European Championship.

== College ==
Campbell is the former Commodore of the Georgetown University Hoyas Sailing Team. At Georgetown, he led the #1 ranked Hoyas in the Inter-Collegiate Sailing Association National Championships by achieving three singlehanded national championships (2003, 2005 and 2006), a second-place finish in the coed dinghy national championship in 2004 in Hood River, Oregon, and a first-place finish at the 2006 team race national championship in Charleston, South Carolina. He was named an ICSA All-American four consecutive years, male Sailing Athlete of the Year in 2002 and 2005, and College Sailor of the Year in 2006.

Sports Illustrated placed him 10th on their list of Georgetown's Top 10 All-Time Athletes.

== Olympics ==
In September 2007 he won the men's Laser Olympic qualifiers in Newport, Rhode Island.

== America's Cup ==
He is the Flight Controller for American Magic, the New York Yacht Club entry at the 2021 America's Cup and the 2024 America’s Cup in Barcelona as well as a tactician with ORACLE Team USA in 2017.

== Personal life ==
He currently lives in San Diego, CA with his wife Jacqueline Campbell (née Schmitz).
