= Leonard Greene =

American inventor and aerodynamics engineer

Leonard Michael Greene
- Born: June 8, 1918; New York City, US
- Died: November 30, 2006 (aged 88); Mamaroneck, New York, US
- Education: City College of New York (B.S. and M.S.); New York University (Post-Graduate Work); Pace University (Honorary degree in 1977)
- Occupations: Inventor, Aerodynamics Engineer
- Known for: Aircraft Stall Warning Device
- Awards: Private Sector Initiative Commendation of the President of the United States (1982 and 1984); National Inventors Hall of Fame (1991); USPTO's Contribution to American Innovation Award (2002)

Leonard Michael Greene (June 8, 1918 – November 30, 2006) was an American inventor and aerodynamics engineer who held more than 200 patents, many of which are aviation-related. He is most well known for his contributions to aviation technology, including his invention, the Aircraft Stall Warning device, which warns pilots when a deadly aerodynamic stall is imminent. To build the device, Greene established the Safe Flight Instrument Corporation in 1946.

Apart from his inventive life, Greene also served as the founder and president of the Institute for Socioeconomic Studies, a think tank to address issues such as poverty and social awareness. Additionally, he co-founded the Corporate Angel Network, a charitable organization that flies patients in corporate aircraft. In 1991, he was inducted into the National Inventors Hall of Fame. Greene died on November 30, 2006, at the age of 88 in Mamaroneck, New York. The cause was complications from lung cancer.

== Early life and family ==
Leonard M. Greene was born in New York City on June 8, 1918. Max Greene, his chemist father, and Lyn Furman Greene, his artist mother, encouraged their son to create his own toys. His parents made him a gift of their old stove, which he could take apart. Greene experienced poverty as a youth during the Depression and never forgot it. When Leonard was 16, his father died.

Greene first married Beverly Kaufman, with whom he had three children; this, however, ended in divorce. Then, he adopted four children of his second wife, Phyllis Saks Greene, with whom he had another child. Phyllis Saks Greene, an heiress of the Saks Fifth Avenue department store family, died in 1965. Greene's third marriage was to Joyce Teck Meller in 1967, which also ended up in divorce in 2005.

A son from the second marriage, Donald Greene, died September 11, 2001, abroad United Airlines Flight 93 when it crashed in Pennsylvania.

== Education ==
Leonard Greene graduated in 1938 from the City College of New York with a B.S. in Chemistry, and went on to receive a M.S. in aeronautical engineering. He received a pilot license at the age of 19 and later did postgraduate work in aeronautics at the Guggenheim School of Aeronautics at New York University.

In 1977, he was awarded the degree of Doctor of Civil Law honoris causa by Pace University.

== Inventions ==
=== Aviation & safe flight instruments ===
==== Stall Warning Device ====
During World War II, Greene joined the Grumman Aircraft Corporation in Bethpage, NY, as an aerodynamicist and engineering test pilot. There he witnessed an aircraft crash caused by stall. In aviation, a stall occurs when the airflow over the wings is no longer sufficient to provide lift – essentially, a stalled wing ceases to function. This happens when the wing exceeds its critical angle of attack. Greene realized that the accident could have been avoided if the pilot had been warned of an imminent stall. Aerodynamic stalls caused the majority of aviation deaths at the time.

In the mid-1940s, Greene developed the first practical way to warn the pilot of the aerodynamic stall. His first design and apparatus included threaded bolts, a bicycle horn and other odd components, all powered by flashlight batteries. Greene filed his device for a patent in 1944, and the patent was issued in 1949. In order to develop his design, Greene founded the Safe Flight Instrument Corporation in White Plains, NY, in 1946. There, he refined and marketed the stall warning indicator.

Basically, his device sounded an alert when the plane was in danger of not having enough lift to stay flying. This alert would allow time for the pilot to take corrective measures. Since its invention, this device became standard equipment for all aircraft and has also helped reduce the number of accidents due to stalling. The Stall Warning Indicator was called “the greatest lifesaver since the invention of the parachute”^{[14]} by the Saturday Evening Post and the device received the Flight Safety Foundation’s first Air Safety Award.

==== Automatic Throttle System & Wind Shear Warning System ====
After developing the Stall Warning Device, Greene continued developing aviation inventions. He and his engineering staff at Safe Flight went on to conceive devices now commonplace in aircraft, including an automatic throttle system in 1956 and a wind-shear warning system that warns a pilot if an aircraft enters a dangerous microburst and provides escape guidance. He developed the latter in the late 1970s after a series of wind-shear-related crashes that claimed hundreds of lives.

==== Supersonic aircraft ====
In his 2001 book Inventorship: The Art of Innovation, Greene described finding "creative ideas in the simplest things."^{8} To address a key problem of supersonic aircraft – window-shattering sonic booms when they break the sound barrier – he turned to the earthworm for inspiration. Just as an earthworm eats and excretes the earth to move past mounds of dirt, he figured a supersonic aircraft's deafening boom is caused from its inability to move air out of its way fast enough to avoid external shock waves. He patented a device, sold to Boeing in 1994, that would use a hollow fuselage and strategically placed ducts to suck in, compress, and then release air through a plane's tail.

=== Outcome ===
Today, his firm supplies air safety and performance technology to virtually every major air carrier, the U.S. Armed Forces, and aircraft manufacturers worldwide. Safe Flight products are installed on over two-thirds of the world's aircraft – in the general aviation, commercial, and military sectors.

Safe Flight made Leonard Greene a multimillionaire. He remained involved in the business until his death and as recently as 1998 co-patented and marketed an airborne power line detector and warning system for helicopters.

=== Non-aviation interests ===
While running Safe Flight, Greene received dozens of patents for his varied interests; many of them went un-marketed. They included a three-dimensional chess game, a device to aid blind painters by using musical notes to identify colors, and an instrument of revenge against telemarketers who interrupted dinner. When a pitchman called, the harassed resident could press a code that alerted the marketer that he would be liable for a surcharge for continuing the call.

== Policy and charitable work ==
=== Institute for Socioeconomic Studies ===
As a successful businessman, Greene implemented innovative employment policies, barring mandatory retirement age, actively recruiting the disabled, and providing profit sharing at his own manufacturing facility.

Seeking a broader forum and greater impact for his ideas, in 1974 he founded and financed the Institute for Socioeconomic Studies (ISES), a small policy research organization in White Plains, NY, that helped advance his ideas on welfare reform, health care, tax reform – and after Greene's son was killed in the September 11 attacks in 2001 – foreign affairs.

According to Ostergren, who worked with Green at ISES, “He didn’t consider himself a Republican or Democrat, conservative or liberal,”^{13} but searched for practical solutions to problems that intrigued him. He advocated a national tax rebate – $12,000 for any family of four, regardless of income, for instance – to alleviate poverty.

Greene criticized the Great Society anti-poverty programs of the 1960s as ineffective, a waste of taxpayer dollars, and a disincentive to work.

He has also made his mark as a social activist, having designed a plan to transform the federal social budget to provide greater income security, middle class tax relief, and market incentives for productivity growth.

In pursuit of these interests, Greene was a member of both the Special Committee on Welfare & Income Maintenance and the Council on Trends & Perspectives of the U.S. Chamber of Commerce. He also served as a member in the Income Maintenance Committee of the Community Service Society and the Work Group on Welfare Reform of the Task Force on the New York City fiscal crisis.

=== Corporate Angel Network ===
In 1981, Greene, whose second wife died of cancer, helped start and finance Corporate Angel Network (CAN), a charitable organization which arranges free transportation on corporate jets for cancer patients. This organization has 500 participating corporations who generously offer their empty seats to cancer patients. CAN flies more than 2,500 cancer patients a year. To date, the organization has flown more than 50,000 patients to treatment centers nationwide.

Greene flew the first Corporate Angel Network Flight on December 22, 1981, when he brought a 16-year-old cancer patient home to Detroit who had just received treatment in New York City.

== Sailing ==
An avid sailor, Greene became a technical adviser to several America's Cup races before buying two-time winner Courageous from Ted Turner in the early 1980s. Sailing under the aegis of the Yale Corinthian Yacht Club, the only undergraduate sailing club ever to participate, the Courageous Syndicates 1986 run at the Cup spearheaded Greene's campaign to restore the Corinthian ideals of amateur sportsmanship to the competition, and more broadly, to team sports in general. Despite several of Greene's modifications to the keel, the boat's age remained a problem, and his team withdrew during the 1986 competition. Following the 1997 donation of Courageous to the Museum of Yachting in Newport, RI, the famed 12-meter was named Rhode Island's State Yacht.

== Awards and achievements ==
- Private Sector Initiative Commendation of the President of the United States (1982 and 1984)
- National Inventors Hall of Fame (1991)
  - Senator John H. Glenn Jr., a former astronaut, inducted Greene into the National Inventors Hall of Fame in 1991 and placed him among "American inventors who have changed our world in ways we can see every day of our lives."^{2}
- Recipient of the 2002 Philip J. Klass Award for Lifetime Achievement
- U.S. Patent and Trademark Office's Contribution to American Innovation Award (2002)
- Special Act Award of the U.S. Environmental Protection Agency
- Flight Safety Foundation’s:
  - Air Safety Award (1949 and 1981)
  - Award for Meritorious Service (1981)
  - Allied Signal/Bendix Trophy Award for Aviation Safety (1999)
- National Business Aviation Association's:
  - Pilot Safety Award (1961)
  - Award for Meritorious Service to Aviation (1996)
- Aviation Week & Space Technology's:
  - Laurels Award in the Field of Electronics (1999)
  - Laureate Award for Lifetime Achievement as a Pioneer in Flight Safety, Performance and Innovation (2001)
- Foundation for Westchester Community Colleges:
  - Medallion Award for Distinguished Achievement in Business, Science and Humanitarianism
- Life member of the Society of Experimental Test Pilots

== Key patents ==
- Greene, U.S. patent 2,478,967, "Air Stall Warning Device for Airplanes"
- Greene, U.S. patent 5,613,652, "Aircraft Auto Throttle System"
- Greene, U.S. patent 4,855,738, "Wind Shear Warning System"
- Greene, U.S. patent 5,289,995, "Supersonic Aircraft"
