= Ian Barrows =

American sailor (born 1995)

Personal information
- Nationality: American
- Born: January 14, 1995 (age 31) Saint Thomas, U.S. Virgin Islands

Sport
- Sport: Sailing
Medal record
Men's sailing
Representing United States
Olympic Games
Bronze medal – third place	2024 Paris	49er
Pan American Games
Gold medal – first place	2023 Santiago	49er
Representing (United States Virgin Islands) U.S. Virgin Islands
Youth Olympic Games
Gold medal – first place	2010 Singapore	Boys' Byte CII

Ian Barrows (born January 14, 1995) is an American sailor. He competed in the 49er event at the 2024 Summer Olympics, where he won a bronze medal with Hans Henken. He was the 2017 College Sailor of the Year and a four-time collegiate All-American sailor while a member of the Yale Bulldogs sailing team. Barrows currently works as an assistant coach for the Charleston Cougars sailing team.

Barrows' elder brother, Thomas Barrows III, is also an Olympian sailor, having competed in the 2008 and 2012 games.
