= Isabelle Kinsolving =

American sailor (born 1979)

Personal information
- Full name: Isabelle Kinsolving Farrar
- Born: November 15, 1979 (age 46) New York City, New York, U.S.
- Height: 5 ft 9 1/2 in (177 cm)
- Weight: 150 lb (68 kg)

Sailing career
- Sport: Sailing
- College team: Yale University
- Class: 470

Isabelle Kinsolving Farrar (born November 15, 1979) is an American sailor who competed in the 2004 Summer Olympics in the 470 class.

== Biography ==
Kinsolving graduated from Groton School in 1998, where she lettered in soccer, ice hockey, and crew. She went on to sail and play ice hockey at Yale University until she graduated in 2002. She received her Juris Doctor degree from the New York University School of Law in 2011.

She was the captain of the Yale sailing team in her senior year. After college, Kinsolving sailed with Katie McDowell and placed 5th in the women's 470 class event at the 2004 Summer Olympics. In 2007, Kinsolving crewed for Erin Maxwell and finished second at the U.S. Olympic Trials, and then went on to win the 470 World Championships in Mordialloc in 2008. In 2018, Farrar's team won the International One Design World championship in Sweden, which was the team's third win following previous wins in 2015 and 2017.

As of 2021, Farrar works for the Ropes & Gray law firm.
