= Charleston Cougars =

Intercollegiate sports teams of College of Charleston

- University: College of Charleston
- Nickname: Cougars
- NCAA: Division I
- Conference: CAA (primary); Sun Belt (beach volleyball); NCEA Independent (women's equestrian)
- Athletic director: Matt Roberts
- Location: Charleston, South Carolina
- Varsity teams: 19 (7 men's, 12 women's)
- Basketball arena: TD Arena
- Baseball stadium: Baseball Stadium at Patriot's Point
- Softball stadium: Softball Stadium at Patriots Point
- Soccer stadium: Ralph Lundy Field at Patriots Point
- Sailing venue: Walker Sailing Complex
- Tennis venue: CofC Tennis Center at Patriots Point
- Outdoor track and field venue: Mount Pleasant Town Hall Track
- Colors: Maroon and white
- Mascot: Clyde The Cougar
- Website: cofcsports.com

The Charleston Cougars are the varsity intercollegiate athletic teams representing the College of Charleston in Charleston, South Carolina. The Cougars compete in NCAA Division I and are currently members of the Coastal Athletic Association. The university sponsors 20 varsity sports teams including men and women's basketball, cross country, golf, soccer and tennis; women's-only dance team, equestrian, beach volleyball, softball, track and field and volleyball; men's-only baseball; and co-ed sailing and cheerleading. The university's most successful sports are co-ed sailing, which has won 14 national championships since 1986, women's volleyball, which has qualified for the NCAA Tournament seven times since 2002 and men's baseball, which has qualified for the NCAA Tournament seven times since 2004.

== Conference affiliations ==
NAIA

- 1963–64 to 1969–70 – Dixie Intercollegiate Athletic Conference (Note: Currently known as the USA South Athletic Conference.)
- 1970–71 to 1990–91 – NAIA independent

NCAA Division I

- 1991–92 to 1997–98 – Trans Atlantic Athletic Conference (Note: Currently known as the Atlantic Sun Conference.)
- 1998–99 to 2012–13 – Southern Conference
- 2013–14 to present – Coastal Athletic Association (Note: Formerly known as the Colonial Athletic Association until 2022–23.)

== Sponsored sports ==
The College of Charleston sponsors teams in six men's and eleven women's NCAA sanctioned sports:

Men's sports	Women's sports
Baseball	Basketball
Basketball	Beach volleyball
Cross country	Cross country
Golf	Equestrian
Sailing	Golf
Soccer	Sailing
Tennis	Soccer
	Softball
	Tennis
	Track and field^{†}
	Volleyball
† – Track and field includes both indoor and outdoor

In addition to this, Charleston considers the women on its cheerleading squad and its all-female dance team to be full varsity athletes.

=== Notables ===
Equestrian: The equestrian team was the Intercollegiate Horse Shows Association Zone 5 champion from 2005 to 2010. They were national championship runners-up in 2013, their highest finish ever.

Football: In 1897, the college fielded its first athletics team, a football squad. A football team played for the college until 1923, when it was disbanded for lack of support.

Tennis: Charleston women's tennis has qualified for the NCAA Tournament six times, most recently five-straight years from 2009 to 2013, under the leadership of director of tennis and head coach Angelo Anastopoulo. Formerly both the men's and women's coach, Anastopoulo is a seven-time conference coach of the year for women's tennis, including the 2015 CAA honor.

The men's team won the SoCon title in 2012 and the CAA title in 2016, accounting for the program's two NCAA Tournament appearances.

Swimming and diving: The men's swimming and diving team were Coastal Collegiate Swimming Association champions in 2008, 2009, and 2012. Both the men's and women's swimming and diving teams were disbanded at the conclusion of the 2014–2015 school year.

=== Basketball ===
The men's basketball team won the NAIA national title in 1983 and made four trips to the NCAA Tournament (1994, 1997, 1998 and 1999) under the leadership of former head coach John Kresse. In 2006, the college welcomed Bobby Cremins, who led Georgia Tech to the Final Four, as its new head basketball coach. Cremins won the 2011 SoCon Coach of the Year and led the Cougars to the NIT. The Cougars returned to the NCAA Tournament in 2018 under Earl Grant, and in back-to-back years under Pat Kelsey, 2023 and 2024. Former Xavier and Louisville head coach Chris Mack currently leads the team.

The women's team began play in 1974. They have made the Women's Basketball Invitational in 2010, 2013, and 2014

=== Baseball ===
The College of Charleston baseball team was the 2004, 2005, 2007 and 2012 SoCon regular season champion. In 2006, the Cougars won the regular season championship and the postseason tournament before advancing to their first-ever NCAA Super Regional. In their first year in the CAA, Charleston won the 2014 CAA Tournament and advanced to the NCAA Super Regional. The Cougars have been to seven NCAA Regionals- all since 2004- and have had 61 players sign professional contracts, including New York Yankees starting left fielder Brett Gardner. The team is currently coached by Chad Holbrook, who was previously the head coach at University of South Carolina. Oliver Marmol, the new manager of the St. Louis Cardinals, once played for the Cougars.

=== Sailing ===
The College of Charleston sailing team is generally considered one of the top programs in the nation, as the team is consistently ranked among Sailing World Magazine's top-20 collegiate teams year in and year out. They compete in the South Atlantic Intercollegiate Sailing Association (SAISA) of the Intercollegiate Sailing Association (ICSA).

=== Golf ===
The Charleston men's golf team won the SoCon Championship in 2002 and four consecutive CAA Championships in their first four years (2014, 2015, 2016, 2017) in the conference, as well as 2021, 2022, and 2024. The men's team has qualified for the NCAA Tournament seven times, including five straight seasons from 2013 to 2017. In 2001, the Cougars advanced to the NCAA National Championships by placing fourth at the Oklahoma State-hosted NCAA Central Regional, which remains their highest finish in program history. Charleston is currently coached by Mark McEntire, a former University of Texas golfer, who won the 2014 & 2016 CAA Coach of the Year awards.

The Charleston women's golf team has won three conference championships as well, 2006 in the SoCon and 2014 & 2015 in the CAA. The Cougars have made six NCAA Tournament appearances, most recently in 2015. The women's team holds the distinction of being the first women's team at Charleston to earn an NCAA Tournament at-large bid (2007). CofC is coached by Jamie Futrell, who has been with Charleston for 20 years and won three conference coach of the year awards (2001, 2014, 2015).

Both teams play their home tournaments at the Links at Stono Ferry in Hollywood, S.C.

=== Volleyball ===
The College of Charleston women's volleyball team was established in 1974 and has become one of the school's most successful sports teams. The Cougars were Southern Conference champions from 2001 to 2012 and made NCAA appearances in 2002, 2005, 2006, 2007, 2009, 2012 and 2013. Charleston advanced to the second round of the NCAA Tournament in 2005 and 2012. They were the 2013 CAA Tournament champions in their first season in the conference and won the 2014 CAA regular season title. The Cougars' volleyball team had won 14 consecutive regular season or postseason conference titles between 2001 and 2014, which was the longest streak in Division I women's volleyball until the streak was snapped with a loss the 2015 CAA Tournament Championship. Charleston is currently coached by Jason Kepner, a former Penn State player and assistant coach at University of Pittsburgh, who won the 2008 SoCon Coach of the Year and 2013 CAA Coach of the Year.

In 2012, Charleston was one of 15 teams in the nation to establish a beach volleyball team. The Cougars have been successful in the beach volleyball arena, qualifying for the first AVCA National Championship in 2012, finishing fourth. Charleston also qualified a duo for the 2015 AVCA National Championship in 2015, finishing fourth. In the 2016 season, with the NCAA sponsoring an official national championship for the first time, the Cougars competed as an independent. For the 2017 season, Charleston beach volleyball became a member of the Coastal Collegiate Sports Association. For the 2021 season, they became a member of the ASUN Conference, and moved from there to the Sun Belt Conference for the 2023 season.

== National championships ==
=== Team ===
Sport	Association	Division	Year	Runner-up	Score
Women's tennis	NAIA	Single	1983	Centenary (LA)	33–30
Men's basketball	NAIA	Single	1983	West Virginia Wesleyan	57–53
