= St. Mary's Seahawks sailing =

College sailing program

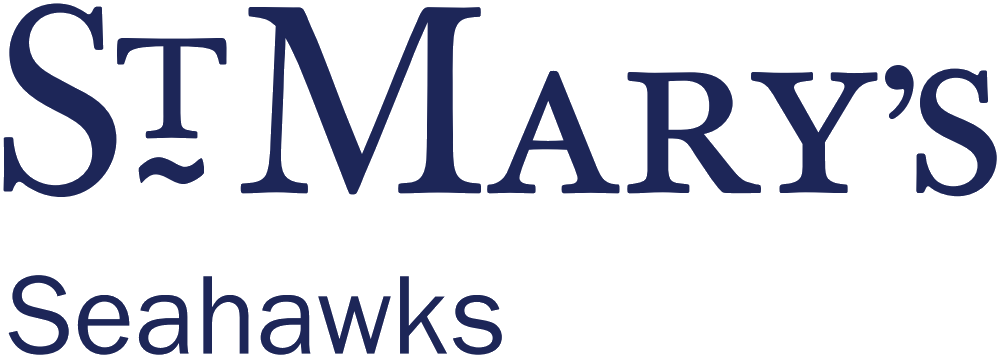
- University: St. Mary's College of Maryland
- Conference: MAISA
- Location: St. Mary's City, Maryland
- Venue: James P. Muldoon River Center
- Area of Competition: St. Marys River (Maryland)
- Nickname: Seahawks

The St. Mary's Seahawks sailing team represents St. Mary's College of Maryland in the intercollegiate sport of sailing. They are members of the Intercollegiate Sailing Association (ICSA), the governing body for collegiate sailing, and compete at the Middle Atlantic Intercollegiate Sailing Association (MAISA). The St. Mary's Seahawks are a powerhouse in college sailing.

The St. Mary’s College of Maryland sailing team currently holds 13 national titles and the school has produced more than 135 ICSA All-American sailors and also four Olympic sailors, one of whom earned a silver medal at the Olympics. The co-ed and the women's teams have been ranked first in the nation two years in a row.

== Fleet ==
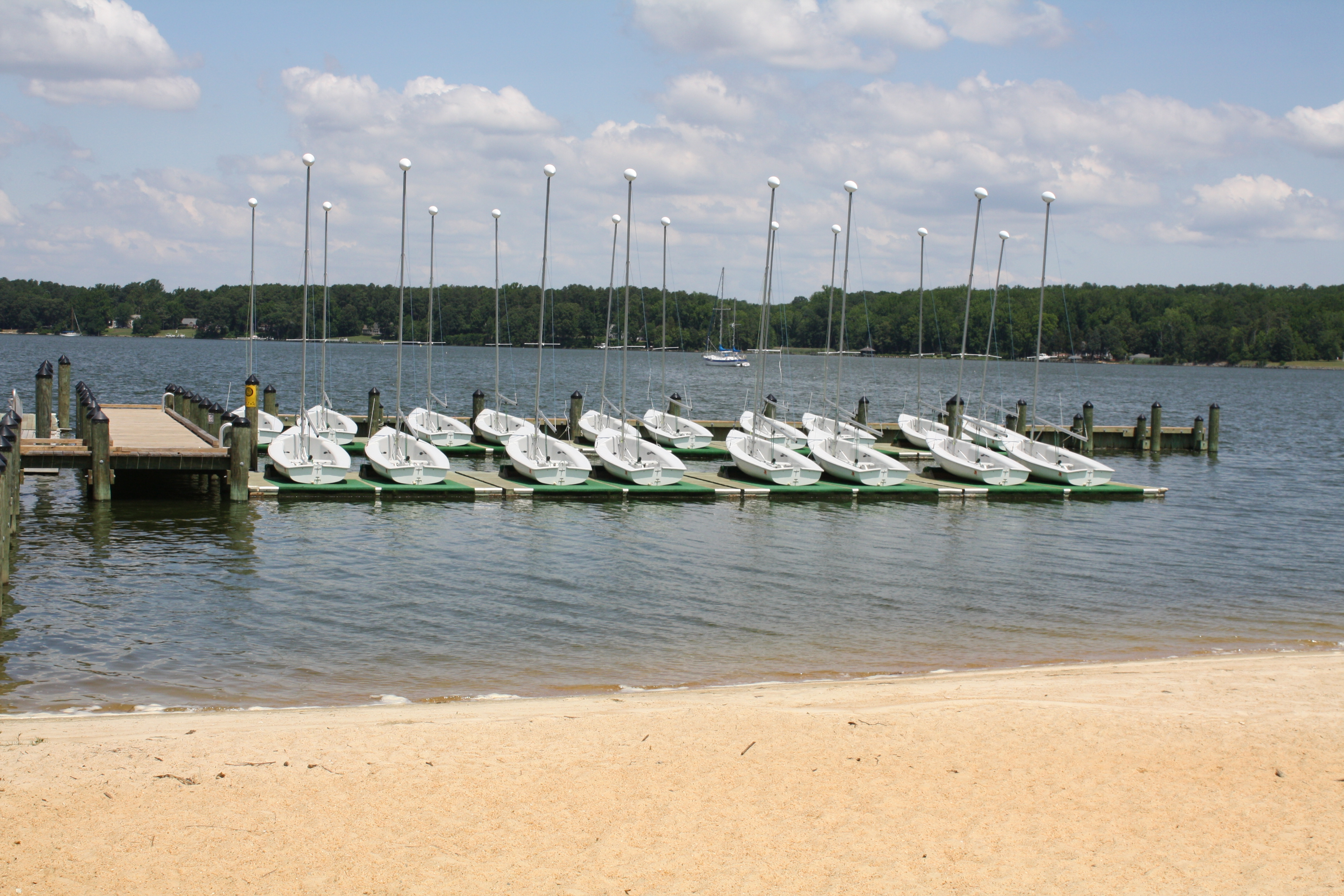
Sailing team dock

- Keelboats
  - Farr 40 "Yellow Jacket"
  - Donovan 27 "Remedy"
  - Beneteau 49 "Riptide"
  - C&C 35 Mk III "Connemara"
  - C&C 30 "Blue Skies"
  - 2 sonars
  - 11 motorboats
- Dinghies
  - 18 Flying Juniors
  - 18 420e
  - 2 Lasers
- Wind surfing

The college has many racing-outfitted windsurfers.

== Accomplishments ==
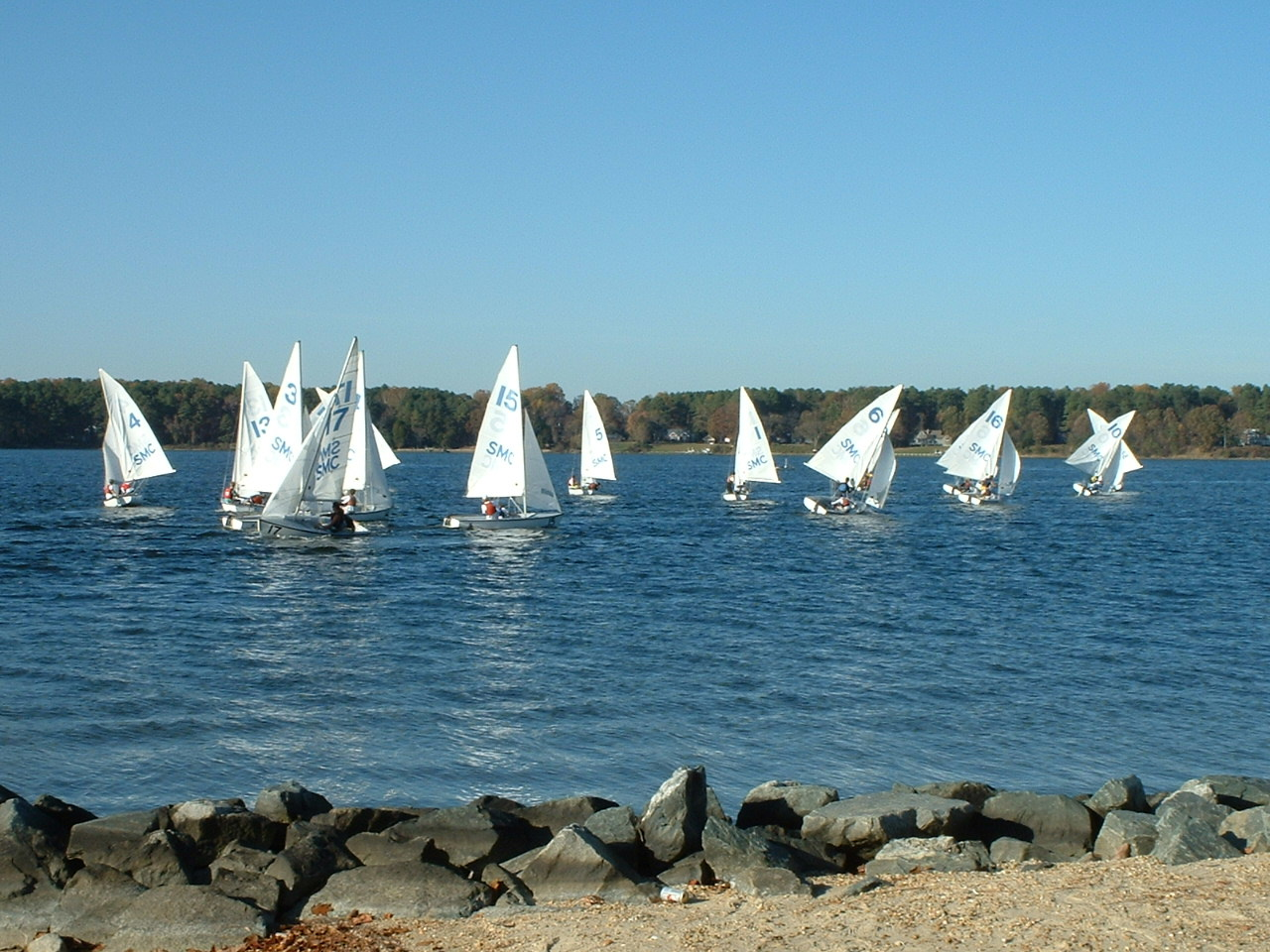
St. Mary's College of Maryland Sailing Team drills

Drawing on students from many Chesapeake Bay communities, St. Mary's College of Maryland is one of the top-ranked varsity sailing schools in the nation.

Awards and titles include:

- St. Mary’s College of Maryland sailing team currently holds 13 national titles.
- Sailing team has produced more than 135 ICSA All-American sailors, a college sailor of the year and a women’s college sailor of the year.
- Four Olympic sailors- one of whom earned a silver medal at the Olympics.
- In 2006, the women's team won the Atlantic Coast Championship, defeating many venerable schools, including Harvard, Yale, Georgetown, and the U.S. Naval Academy.
- The co-ed and women's teams have been ranked first in the nation by Sailing World Magazine for the past two years.
- In 2004, the College won the annual Inter-Collegiate Sailing Association (ICSA)/Layline North American Team Race Championship.
- St. Mary's graduate Scott Steele (Class of '81) won the silver medal for windsurfing in the Olympics.

== National championships ==
The team holds 15 National Championships:

- Dinghy National Championships (3): 2000, 2002, 2009
- Women's Dinghy National Championships (2): 1995, 2007
- Team Racing National Championships (5): 1999, 2000, 2004, 2007, 2010
- Men's Singlehanded National Championships (2): 2020, 2022
- Women's Single-handed National Championships (1): 1998
- Sloop National Championships (2): 1994, 2008

And received the Leonard M. Fowle Trophy in 2000.

== Sailors ==
Mark Ivey was College Sailor of the Year in 2000 and Adrienne Patterson was Women's College Sailor of the Year in 2007.

=== Olympians ===
Jesse Kirkland, Rodrigo Amado, Scott Steele, Mayumi Roller, Farrah Hall and Paul Stoeken are olympic sailors from St. Mary's.

=== World champions ===
- Anthony Kotoun in J/24 and Melges 32.
