= Inter-Collegiate Sailing Association =

US governing organization for college sailing competitions

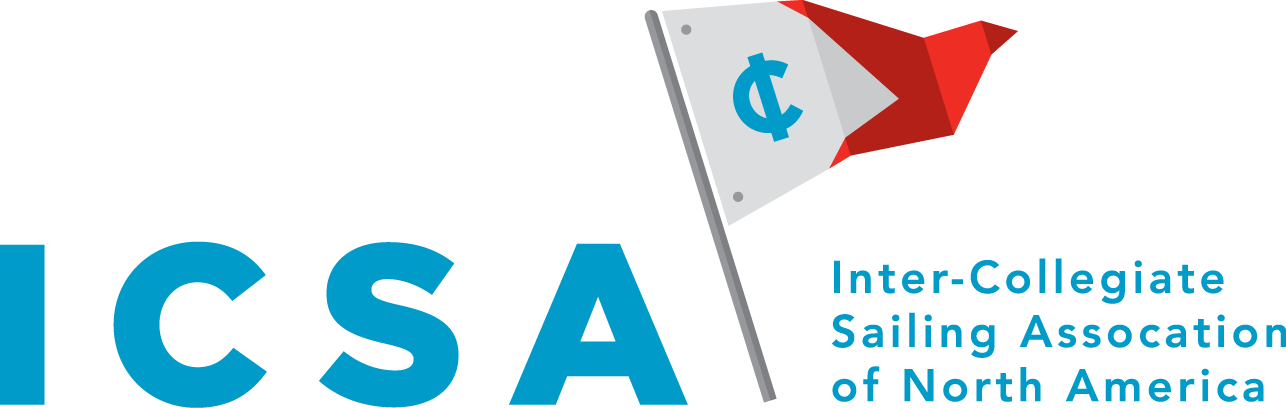
- Abbreviation: ICSA
- Legal status: Association
- Headquarters: Norfolk, Virginia, United States
- Region served: United States and Canada
- President: Mitchell Brindley
- Website: collegesailing.org

The Inter-Collegiate Sailing Association of North America (ICSA) is a volunteer organization that serves as the governing authority for all sailing competition at colleges and universities throughout the United States and in some parts of Canada. It was founded in 1937 as the Inter-Collegiate Yacht Racing Association, and changed to its current name in 2001.

== History ==
=== 19th century ===
The first college sailing club to be formed in the United States was the Yale Corinthian Yacht Club, established in Branford, Connecticut in 1881, three years before the founding of the Oxford University Yacht Club at the University of Oxford in 1884 followed by the Stevens Yacht Club at Stevens Institute of Technology in 1891, the Cambridge University Yacht Club at the University of Cambridge in 1893, the Harvard University Yacht Club in 1894, and Brown University Yacht Club in 1896.

=== 20th century ===
Harvard and Yale held a sailing event in 1911, but this was a long-distance 'cruise' rather than a fleet or team race, and only one Yale yacht attended the event. Organized intercollegiate fleet racing began in 1928 between just a few schools in Eight-Metres for the Oliver Hay Trophy, now known as the McMillan Cup.

The Inter-Collegiate Sailing Association (ICSA) was formed June 16, 1930, as the Inter-Collegiate Yacht Racing Association (ICYRA).

The first inter-collegiate dinghy fleet event, the Boston Dinghy Club Challenge Cup, took place with 34 entrants in 1930 in parallel with the founding of the ICYRA. There was also a major sailing event between Princeton and Dartmouth in 1934, but details of its format are not recorded.

The initial emphasis of the ICYRA was very much on fleet racing, rather than team racing, but during the 1930s, team racing between individual colleges started to emerge, with 2 to 4 colleges meeting up, each fielding 2 to 5 boats. Collegiate dinghy sailing blossomed in 1934–36 with initiatives taken by Princeton with its 'Tiger' dinghies (1934), MIT (the famous Pavilion was founded and built in 1935 at the instigation of Walter C. "Jack" Wood), and Brown (1936). The first ICSA dinghy fleet regatta took place in the spring of 1937 at the MIT Pavilion and was won by MIT, with Brown, Cornell, Harvard, Princeton, Williams, and Yale also competing.

In the fall of 1937, 19 colleges took part in another ICYRA dinghy regatta at the MIT Pavilion. The Morss Trophy was also first awarded in 1937, being won by MIT

Following World War II, collegiate sailing spread across the U.S. and parts of Canada, with ICYRA membership rapidly growing to modern numbers. George O’Day (Harvard), Harry Anderson (Yale) and Bill Cox Sr. (Princeton) helped develop the ICYRA team race rules in the 1940s, and these were the forerunners of the NAYRU (now US Sailing) and International Yacht Racing Union (later International Sailing Federation) team race rules.

A regional team racing championship, four-a-side format, first took place in 1950 in the New England District for the Leonard M. Fowle Trophy, a separate trophy from the new Fowle Trophy that is awarded to the best overall collegiate team. National team racing for the Walter Cromwell Wood Bowl, four-a-side format, commenced in 1970 between teams formed with sailors within a particular ICSA district or 'conference', and, since 1977, individuals from one college. The University of Rhode Island was the first winner of the current team racing championship in 1977.

=== 21st century ===
In 2001 the Inter-Collegiate Yacht Racing Association became the Inter-Collegiate Sailing Association to better reflect the breadth of ships used in competition. In 2011, a group of Canadian University teams formed the Canadian Intercollegiate Sailing Association (CICSA), based on the ICSA's model. CICSA's two most successful teams, Queen's University and McGill University, also compete in the ICSA.

== Teams ==
278 schools are listed in the ICSA team database, and over 170 are currently active. 34 schools have launched fully funded varsity teams, with the rest being club teams.

Varsity teams include:

- Boston College
- Bowdoin College
- Brown University
- California State University Maritime Academy
- Christopher Newport University
- College of Charleston
- Connecticut College
- Cornell University
- Dartmouth College
- Eckerd College
- Georgetown University
- Hampton University
- Harvard University
- Hobart and William Smith Colleges
- Jacksonville University
- Maine Maritime Academy
- Massachusetts Institute of Technology
- Massachusetts Maritime Academy
- Old Dominion University
- Roger Williams University
- Rollins College
- Salve Regina University
- St. Mary's College of Maryland
- Stanford University
- State University of New York Maritime College
- Tufts University
- Tulane University
- United States Coast Guard Academy
- United States Merchant Marine Academy
- United States Naval Academy
- University of Hawaii at Manoa
- University of South Florida
- Washington College
- Webb Institute
- Yale University

Active club teams include:

- American University
- Arizona State University
- Auburn University
- Bates College
- Baylor University
- Bentley University
- Boston University
- Bowling Green State University
- Brandeis University
- California Polytechnic State University, San Luis Obispo
- California State University Channel Islands
- California State University, Monterey Bay
- Case Western Reserve University
- Catholic University of America
- Clemson University
- Cleveland State University
- College of Coastal Georgia
- Columbia University
- Colgate University
- Davidson College
- Denison University
- Drexel University
- Duke University
- Embry-Riddle Aeronautical University
- Fairfield University
- Florida Gulf Coast University
- Florida Institute of Technology
- Florida State University
- Fordham University
- Gannon University
- George Washington University
- Georgia Tech
- Georgia Southern University
- Grand Valley State University
- Hamilton College
- Hillsdale College
- Hope College
- Indiana University
- Indiana University of Pennsylvania
- Lake Forest College
- Loyola University Maryland
- Loyola University New Orleans
- Marquette University
- McGill University
- Mercyhurst University
- Miami University
- Michigan State University
- Michigan Technological University
- Middlebury College
- Monmouth University
- New College of Florida
- North Carolina State University
- Northeastern University
- Northern Michigan University
- Northwestern University
- Ocean County College
- Ohio State University
- Ohio University
- Olin College
- Oregon State University
- Palm Beach Atlantic University
- Penn State Erie, The Behrend College
- Pennsylvania State University
- Portland State University
- Princeton University
- Purdue University
- Queens University of Charlotte
- Rochester Institute of Technology
- Rutgers University
- Sacred Heart University
- Saginaw Valley State University
- Saint Mary's College (Indiana)
- San Diego State University
- Santa Clara University
- St. John's College (Kansas)
- Stevens Institute of Technology
- Stony Brook University
- Syracuse University
- Texas A&M University
- Texas A&M University-Corpus Christi
- Texas A&M University at Galveston
- Texas Christian University
- The Citadel
- United States Military Academy
- University of Buffalo
- University of California, Berkeley
- University of California, Davis
- University of California, Irvine
- University of California, Los Angeles
- University of California, San Diego
- University of California, Santa Barbara
- University of California, Santa Cruz
- University of Central Florida
- University of Central Oklahoma
- University of Chicago
- University of Cincinnati
- University of Delaware
- University of Florida
- University of Georgia
- University of Illinois Urbana-Champaign
- University of Iowa
- University of Kansas
- University of Maine
- University of Maryland, College Park
- University of Maryland, Baltimore County
- University of Massachusetts Amherst
- University of Massachusetts Dartmouth
- University of Miami
- University of Michigan
- University of Minnesota
- University of Nebraska–Lincoln
- University of New Hampshire
- University of North Carolina at Chapel Hill
- University of North Carolina Wilmington
- University of North Texas
- University of Notre Dame
- University of Oregon
- University of Pennsylvania
- University of Pittsburgh
- University of Rhode Island
- University of Rochester
- University of South Alabama
- University of South Carolina
- University of Southern California
- University of St. Thomas (Minnesota)
- University of Tennessee
- University of Texas at Austin
- University of Toledo
- University of Vermont
- University of Virginia
- University of Washington
- University of Wisconsin-Madison
- Vanderbilt University
- Villanova University
- Virginia Tech
- Wake Forest University
- Washington University in St. Louis
- Wentworth Institute of Technology
- Wesleyan University
- Western Michigan University
- Western Washington University
- College of William & Mary
- Williams College
- Worcester Polytechnic Institute

== Structure ==
There are six (formerly seven) conferences in ICSA collegiate sailing. The conferences within ICSA schedule and administer regattas within their established regions:

- Middle Atlantic Intercollegiate Sailing Association (MAISA)
- Midwest Collegiate Sailing Association (MCSA)
- New England Intercollegiate Sailing Association (NEISA)
- Northwest Intercollegiate Sailing Association (NWICSA; dissolved 2022)
- Pacific Coast Collegiate Sailing Conference (PCCSC)
- South Atlantic Intercollegiate Sailing Association (SAISA)
- Southeastern Intercollegiate Sailing Association (SEISA)

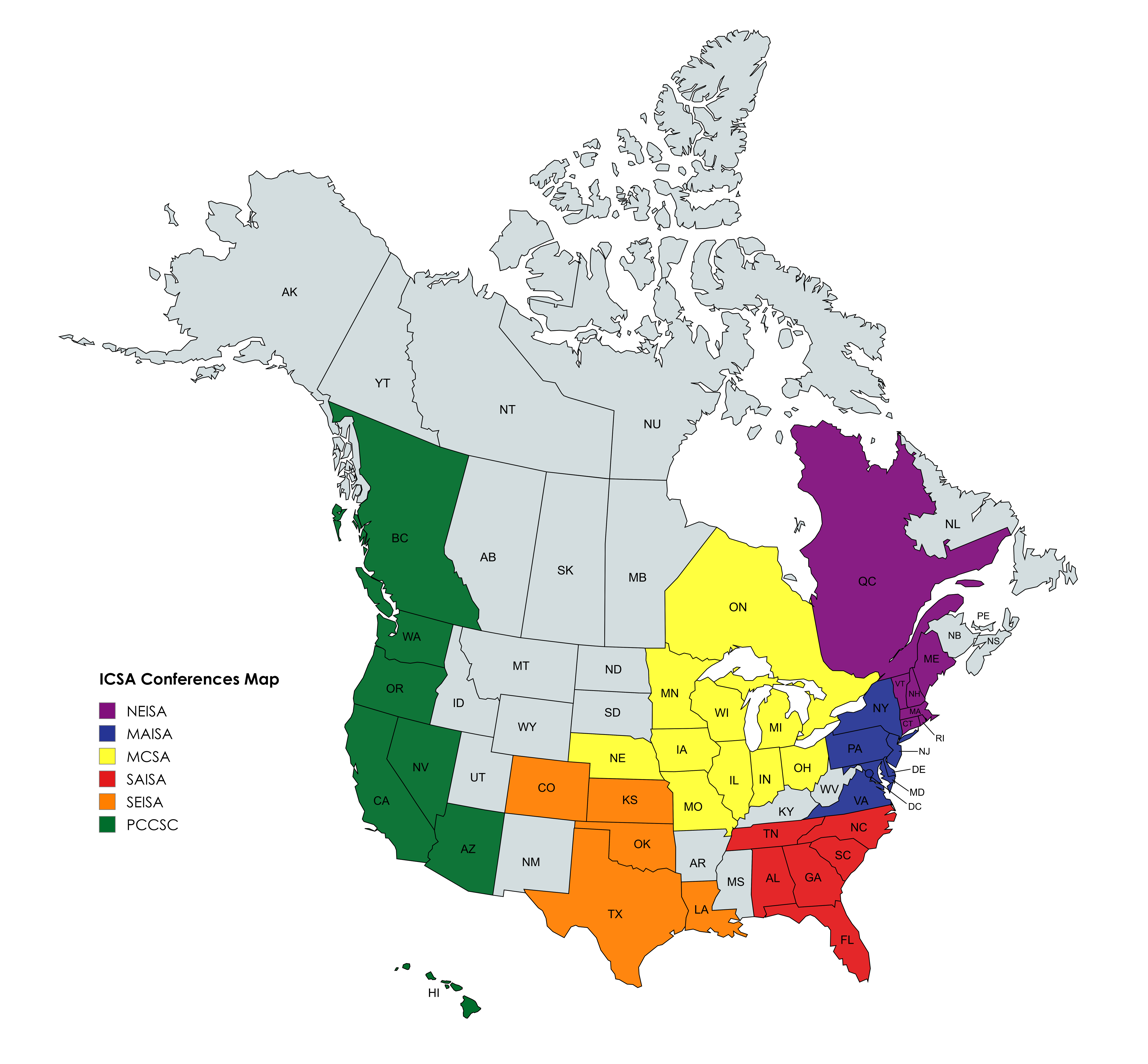

Each conference is supervised by a Graduate Secretary and an executive committee, which comprises both graduate and undergraduate students. Both the Graduate Secretary and the executive committee are elected by representatives from each school in the conference. Each conference conducts local and intersectional regattas and holds district championships in both the fall and the spring.

== Championships ==
The conference or district championships allow schools to qualify for the Intercollegiate Sailing Association National Championships.

== ICSA College Sailing Hall of Fame ==
The ICSA College Sailing Hall of Fame was established in 1969. The Hall of Fame is located in the Robert Crown Sailing Center at the United States Naval Academy in Annapolis, Maryland.

=== ICSA Hall of Fame Awards ===
There are several awards that are bestowed upon collegiate sailors at the end of every full racing season:

- Competitors Division
  - College Sailor of the Year
  - Women’s College Sailor of the Year
  - All American Skipper
  - All American Woman Skipper
  - All American Crew
  - Academic All-American Team
  - Jim Rousmaniere Student Leadership Award
  - Robert H. Hobbs Sportsmanship Award
- Afterguard Division
  - Campbell Family Award for Lifetime Service
  - Graham Hall Award for Outstanding Service by a College Sailing Professional
  - Outstanding Service by a Volunteer Award
  - Meritorious Service Award

== Participation ==
ICSA seeks to promote the sport of sailing throughout North America and encourage participation in the sport among young people. Although both varsity and club teams compete fiercely to qualify for district championships and nationals, the overall goal is to promote sailing and have fun on the water. Thus, most college sailing programs do not require previous sailing experience and encourage widespread participation among students. However, most schools also value students who have high school sailing experience.

== Instruction ==
As education and training have been two cornerstones of the ICSA since its inception most college sailing programs offer general instruction to the student body, and in some cases the general public. Often college sailing programs serve to introduce many people to the sport of sailing.

Many college sailors have gone on to race in the America's Cup as well as in the Olympics.

== Corporate partners ==
Vanguard Sailboats was an official partner of ICSA for many years and the boatbuilder annually sponsored the ICSA National Championships. Through 2021, LaserPerformance was the official sponsor. As of May 2024, Zim Sailing and West Coast Sailing are the Official Suppliers of College Sailing.
