= Sailing at the 2022 Bolivarian Games =

Sailing competitions at the 2022 Bolivarian Games

- Sailing pictogram
- Venue: Tominé Reservoir
- Dates: 27 June – 2 July 2022
- Competitors: 73 from 9 nations

Champions
- Peru (2 gold, 3 silver, 3 bronze)

Sailing competitions at the 2022 Bolivarian Games in Valledupar, Colombia were held from 27 June to 2 July 2022 at Tominé Reservoir in Guatavita, a sub-venue outside Valledupar.

Seven medal events were scheduled to be contested; three for men, three for women and one mixed event. A total of 73 athletes (36 men and 37 women) will compete in the events. The events were open competitions without age restrictions, except for the Optimist dinghy sailing that is restricted for under-16 sailors.

Peru were the sailing competitions defending champions after having won them in the previous edition in Santa Marta 2017. Peru and Ecuador won 2 gold medals each, however, Peru reached two more silver medals (3–1) than Ecuador to win the sailing competitions again.

== Participating nations ==
A total of 9 nations (5 ODEBO nations and 4 invited) registered athletes for the rowing competitions. Each nation was able to enter two boats per event and a maximum of 18 sailors (8 men and 10 women). Each nation could register up to two sailors for each men and women singles events and up to two teams conformed by one man and two women each for the mixed event.

- Chile (13 sailors)
- Colombia (8)
- Ecuador (9)
- Dominican Republic (2)
- El Salvador (4)
- Guatemala (7)
- Paraguay (1)
- Peru (18)
- Venezuela (11)

== Venue ==
The sailing competitions were held at the Tominé Reservoir at kilometer 10 on the Sesquile - Gutavita road in Guatavita, a municipality of Cundinamarca Department.

== Medal summary ==
=== Medal table ===
* Host nation (Host nation)

Rank	Nation	Gold	Silver	Bronze	Total
1	Peru	2	3	3	8
2	Ecuador	2	1	0	3
3	Colombia	1	0	1	2
4	El Salvador	1	0	0	1
4	Venezuela	1	0	0	1
6	Chile	0	2	2	4
7	Guatemala	0	1	1	2
Totals (7 entries)		7	7	7	21

Source: Bolivarianos Valledupar 2022 – Sailing medals

=== Medalists ===
==== Men's events ====
Event	Gold	Silver	Bronze
Laser	Enrique Arathoon; El Salvador	Stefano Peschiera; Peru	Clemente Seguel; Chile
Sunfish	Simón Gómez; Colombia	José Daniel Hernández; Guatemala	Jean Paul de Trazegnies; Peru
Optimist	Jonas Koreiva; Ecuador	Stefano Moy; Peru	Tomas De La Vega; Colombia

==== Women's events ====
Event	Gold	Silver	Bronze
Laser Radial	Daniela Rivera; Venezuela	Florencia Chiarella; Peru	Sophie Zimmermann; Peru
Sunfish	Caterina Romero; Peru	Rafaela Salvatore; Chile	Josselyn Echeverria; Guatemala
Optimist	Gracia Carrillo; Peru	Camila Ernst; Chile	Rafaella Parodi; Peru

==== Mixed event ====
Event	Gold	Silver	Bronze
Lightning	Ecuador (ECU); Mikaela Garcés; Jonathan Martinetti; Moira Padilla	Ecuador (ECU); Irene Suárez; Julio Andrés Vélez; Ariana Villena	Chile (CHI); Paula Herman; Pedro Felipe Robles; Carmina Malsch
