= Paris Henken =

American sailor (born 1995)

Personal information
- Born: December 22, 1995 (age 30) San Clemente, California, U.S.
- Height: 5 ft 6 in (1.68 m) (2016)
- Weight: 139 lb (63 kg) (2016)

Sport
- Country: United States
- Sport: Sailing
- College team: College of Charleston
- Club: San Diego Yacht Club
Medal record
Sailing
Representing United States
Pan American Games
Bronze medal – third place	2015 Toronto	49er FX

Paris Henken (born December 22, 1995) is an American competitive sailor. She competed at the 2016 Summer Olympics in Rio de Janeiro, in the women's 49er FX.

She learned to sail at the Coronado Yacht Club in the Naples Sabot class. She was runner-up at the 2011 High School Sailing National Championships with Coronado High School, and bronze medallist at the 2015 Pan American Games. In 2021 she won the ICSA Women's Dinghy National Championship with the College of Charleston, and was named ICSA Women's College Sailor of the Year.

She is the sister of 2024 Summer Olympic Bronze Medalist Hans Henken.
