= Harvard Crimson sailing =

Intercollegiate athletic team

Harvard University Sailing Team
- Burgee
- University: Harvard University
- Conference: NEISA
- Location: Cambridge, Massachusetts, U.S.
- Venue: Harvard Sailing Center
- Area of Competition: Charles River
- Nickname: Crimson

The Harvard University sailing team is a varsity intercollegiate athletic team of Harvard University in Cambridge, Massachusetts, United States. The team is a member of the New England Intercollegiate Sailing Association, which is part of the Inter-Collegiate Sailing Association.

== National championships ==
Harvard has won 24 national championships:

- 5 Dinghy National Championships (1952, 1953, 1959, 1974 2003, and 2024)
- 5 Women’s Dinghy National Championships (1968, 1969, 1970 and 1972 as Radcliffe College; and 2005)
- 4 Team Racing National Championships (1970 and 1974 with the NEISA team; 2002, 2003, and 2025)
- 3 Men's Singlehanded National Championships (Robert E. Doyle in 1970, Vincent Porter in 2004 and Henry Marshall in 2019)
- 4 Women’s Singlehanded National Championships (Margaret Gill in 1999 and 2001, Sophia Montgomery in 2023 and 2025)
- 3 Sloop National Championships (2001, 2002 and 2025)

And received the Leonard M. Fowle Trophy in 2001, 2002, 2003, 2004 and 2005.

== Sailors ==
- ICSA College Sailor of the Year:
  - Sean Wagstad Doyle in 2002
  - Clayton Peter Bischoff in 2003
  - Ewell Cardwell Potts IV in 2004
- ICSA Women's College Sailor of the Year:
  - Genny Tulloch in 2004

== Fleet ==
The fleet of the team's dinghies include 18 420s, 18 Flying Juniors (FJs), and 4 Lasers.

== Venue ==
The home venue of the team is the Harvard Sailing Center, previously named the Harvard University Yacht Club.
