= Leonard M. Fowle Trophy =

The Leonard M. Fowle Trophy is a sailing trophy awarded annually by the Inter-Collegiate Sailing Association (ICSA) to the best overall collegiate team.

The team with the most points, which are compiled from results of the ICSA Women’s Singlehanded, Men’s Singlehanded, Match Racing, Women’s Dinghy, Team Racing, and Coed Dinghy National Championships, determines the Fowle trophy.

== Winners ==
Year	Winner
1972	State University of New York Maritime College
1973	State University of New York Maritime College
1974	Tulane University
1975	Tufts University
1976	Tufts University
1977	United States Naval Academy
1978	United States Naval Academy
1979	United States Naval Academy
1980	United States Naval Academy
1981	United States Naval Academy
1982	United States Naval Academy
1983	United States Naval Academy
1984	Tufts University
1985	Boston University
1986	College of Charleston
1987	United States Naval Academy
1988	College of Charleston
1989	Old Dominion University
1990	Old Dominion University
1991	Brown University
1992	United States Naval Academy
1993	Tufts University
1994	Tufts University
1995	Tufts University
1996	Tufts University
1997	United States Naval Academy
1998	College of Charleston
1999	Tufts University
2000	St. Mary's College of Maryland
2001	Harvard University
2002	Harvard University
2003	Harvard University
2004	Harvard University
2005	Harvard University
2006	Georgetown University
2007	College of Charleston
2008	Boston College
2009	Yale University
2010	Boston College
2011	Boston College
2012	College of Charleston
2013	Yale University
2014	Yale University
2015	College of Charleston
2016	Yale University
2017	College of Charleston
2018	College of Charleston
2019	Yale University
2021	College of Charleston
2022	Yale University
2023	Stanford University
2024	Brown University
2025	Stanford University
2026	Harvard University
