= South Atlantic Intercollegiate Sailing Association =

- Conference: ICSA
- Founded: 1964
- Commissioner: Dana Magliola
- No. of teams: 33
- Region: Tennessee; North Carolina; South Carolina; Georgia; Florida; Alabama
- Official website: saisasailing.com

The South Atlantic Intercollegiate Sailing Association (SAISA) is a conference in the Intercollegiate Sailing Association and was founded April 25, 1964. SAISA encompasses a geographic area that includes Tennessee, North Carolina, South Carolina, Georgia, Florida, and northern Alabama. There are 33 active members, which include both public and private universities.

== Members ==
- Auburn University
- Clemson University
- College of Charleston
- College of Coastal Georgia
- Davidson College
- Duke University
- East Carolina University
- Eckerd College
- Embry–Riddle Aeronautical University
- Florida Institute of Technology
- Florida State University
- Georgia Institute of Technology
- Georgia Southern University
- Jacksonville University
- Meredith College
- New College of Florida
- North Carolina State University
- Northwest Florida State College
- Palm Beach Atlantic University
- Rollins College
- Savannah College of Art and Design
- The Citadel
- University of Central Florida
- University of Florida
- University of Georgia
- University of Miami
- University of North Carolina at Chapel Hill
- University of North Carolina Wilmington
- University of North Florida
- University of South Carolina
- University of South Florida
- University of Tennessee
- Vanderbilt University
- Wake Forest University

== Competition ==
The conference participates in both fall and spring college sailing season. There are coed, single handed, women's, match racing and team racing regattas nearly each weekend.

=== Coed Dinghy Events ===
Dinghy regattas sailed on FJs and 420s are the main events and focus of the conference. The regular season of each semester begins with a conference wide regatta called the SAISA Open. Then, each division has Points events, of which there are four or five North Division Qualifying Events and five or six South Division Qualifying Events. These events determine the points a team will receive to qualify for the championship. After regular season events, 18 teams will qualify for the SAISA Open Conference Championships. The host of the championship rotates between divisions each season. A certain number of berths are then given to the conference for participation in the subsequent Atlantic Coast Dinghy Championship and the Intercollegiate Sailing Association National Championships

=== Other Events ===
Each semester there are also several independently organized regattas, Men's Single handed Championship, Women's Single handed Championship, Women's Dinghy regattas and Championship, Team Race Championship, and Match Race Championship. SAISA also participates in Intersectional regattas against other conferences each year.
