= Tufts Jumbos sailing =

College sailing program

Tufts University Sailing Team
- Burgee
- University: Tufts University
- Conference: NEISA
- Location: Medford, Massachusetts
- Venue: Bacow Sailing Pavilion
- Area of Competition: Upper Mystic Lake
- Nickname: Jumbos

The Tufts University Sailing Team represents Tufts University in the intercollegiate sport of sailing. They are members of the Intercollegiate Sailing Association (ICSA), the governing body for collegiate sailing, and compete at the New England Intercollegiate Sailing Association (NEISA).

Led by head coach Johnny Norfleet since 2023.

== National championships ==
The team holds 28 National Championships:

- Dinghy Championships (5): 1976, 1980, 1981, 1997, 2001
- Women's Dinghy National Championships (8): 1984, 1986, 1990, 1993, 1994, 1996, 1999, 2003
- Team Racing National Championships (6): 1976 (with NEISA), 1984, 1993, 1994, 1995, 1996
- Men's Single-handed National Championships (5): 1975 (Altreuter), 1976 (McCreary), 1980 (Johnstone), 1993 (Mendelblatt), 1995 (Bischoff)
- Women's Single-handed National Championships (3): 1995 (Harris), 1996 (McDowell), 1997
- Match Race (previously Sloop) National Championships (1): 2013

And received the Leonard M. Fowle Trophy (for the top overall team across the various national championships) in eight seasons: 1975, 1976, 1984, 1993, 1994, 1995, 1996, 1999

== Sailors ==
66 men and 25 women were All-Americans.

Team members have received the ICSA College Sailor of the Year award 4 times:

- Roger Altreuter in 1975
- R. Stuart Johnstone in 1980
- Paul Dickey in 1981
- Senet Bischoff in 1996

And the ICSA Women's College Sailor of the Year once:

- Kaitlin Storck in 2008

=== Olympians ===
Carlos Echeverria in 1956; Peter Commette in 1976; Magnus Grävare in 1984; Mark Mendelblatt in 2004, 2008 and 2012; Jen Provan in 2004 and 2008; Tyler Paige in 2021; are Olympic sailors from Tufts.

=== World champions ===
- Dave Curtis in 1976, 1978, 1981, 1982, 1983, 1985, 1992 (Etchells), 1967 (Jolly Boat), 1981 (Soling) and 1984 (J/24)
- Elizabeth Gelenitis "Betsy" Allison in 1983 (Women's Laser), 1987 (Lightning), 1987, 1991, 1993, 1995, 1997 (Women's J/24), 1999 (Match Racing), 2003 (Yngling) and 2023 (Hansa 303)
- Bruce Burton in 1986, 1987 (Etchells)
- Scott Kyle in 1986, 1990 (Sunfish)
- Peter Comette in 1974 (Laser)
- Nick Trotman in 1998 (505) and 1998 (team racing)
- Tomas Hornos in 2007 (Snipe)
- Brett Davis, Josh Adams and Victoria Wadsworth in 1998 (Team Racing)
- Graeme Woodworth, Tim Fallon and Karen Renzulli in 2005 (team racing)
- Lisa Keith and Peter Levesque in 2007 and 2009 (team racing)
- Senet Bischoff in 2014 and 2017 (Corinthian Etchells)
- Mark Mendelblatt in 1991 (Laser II) and 1998 (team racing)

== Sailing venue ==
The home for the Tufts University sailing program is the Bacow Sailing Pavilion, named after Lawrence Bacow and his wife, Adele Fleet Bacow. It opened in the fall of 2013 and was built on the foundation of its 60-year-old predecessor, on Medford's Upper Mystic Lake.

The two-story facility houses locker rooms, a kitchen, meeting rooms, and a large boatshop.

== Fleet ==
The fleet of Tufts University Sailing Team's includes 18 FJs, as well as several ILCAs.
