= ICSA College Sailor of the Year =

ICSA College Sailor of the Year, also known as Marlow Ropes College Sailor of the Year because of the sponsorship by Marlow Ropes, is an award annually presented, since 1968, by the United States Naval Academy and the executive committee of the Inter-Collegiate Sailing Association (ICSA) to the “Best Intercollegiate Sailor” within ICSA competition, who receives the Everett Morris Memorial Trophy. The trophy is awarded annually for outstanding performance at the highest level of sailing in the collegiate year. The trophy is named in memory of a distinguished journalist who spent more than 30 years as a yachting writer and editor.

== History ==
Year	Winner	Team
1968	Scott Allan	University of Southern California
1969	Tim Hogan	University of Southern California
1970	Richard Doyle	University of Notre Dame
1971	Johnathon Wright	United States Merchant Marine Academy
1972	Gary Jobson	State University of New York Maritime College
1973	Gary Jobson	State University of New York Maritime College
1974	Augie Diaz	Tulane University
1975	Roger Altreuter	Tufts University
1976	Peter Isler	Yale University
1977	William Buchan	University of Washington
1978	Stephen Benjamin	Yale University
1979	Alexander Smigelski	United States Merchant Marine Academy
1980	R. Stuart Johnstone	Tufts University
1981	Paul Dickey	Tufts University
1982	Ken Read	Boston University
1983	Morgan Reeser	United States Merchant Marine Academy
1984	Morgan Reeser	United States Merchant Marine Academy
1985	Jay Renehan	United States Merchant Marine Academy
1986	Bradford Read	Boston University
1987	Robert Hallawell	United States Naval Academy
1988	Chris Larson	College of Charleston
1989	Terry Hutchinson	Old Dominion University
1990	Terry Hutchinson	Old Dominion University
1991	Willis Lovell	College of Charleston
1992	Bradley Rodi	United States Naval Academy
1993	Bradley Rodi	United States Naval Academy
1994	Tyler Moore	College of Charleston
1995	Ryan Cox	United States Naval Academy
1996	Senet Bischoff	Tufts University
1997	Tim Wadlow	Boston University
1998	William Hardesty	United States Merchant Marine Academy
1999	Mark Ivey	St. Mary's College of Maryland
2000	Dalton Bergan	University of Southern California
2001	Tyler Pruett	Boston College
2002	Sean Doyle	Harvard University
2003	Clay Bischoff	Harvard University
2004	Cardwell Potts	Harvard University
2005	Mikee Anderson-Mitterling	University of Southern California
2006	Andrew Campbell	Georgetown University
2007	Trevor Moore	Hobart and William Smith Colleges
2008	Chris Behm	Georgetown University
2009	Charlie Buckingham	Georgetown University
2010	Thomas Barrows III	Yale University
2011	Charlie Buckingham	Georgetown University
2012	Chris Barnard	Georgetown University
2013	Juan Maegli	College of Charleston
2014	Graham Landy	Yale University
2015	Nevin Snow	Georgetown University
2016	Nevin Snow	Georgetown University
2017	Ian Barrows	Yale University
2018	Stefano Peschiera	College of Charleston
2019	Nicholas Baird	Yale University
2020	Jack Parkin	Stanford University
2021	Joseph "JC" Hermus	United States Naval Academy
2022	Shawn Harvey	Yale University
2023	Jack Egan	Yale University
2024	Lachlain McGranahan	Harvard University
2025	Justin Callahan	Harvard University
2026	Justin Callahan	Harvard University
