= Hans Henken =

American sailor gold medalist

Personal information
- Born: June 4, 1992 (age 34) Laguna Beach, California, U.S.
- Spouse: Helena Scutt

Sailing career
- Sport: Sailing
- College team: Stanford University
- Classes: F50, 49er, 29er, Moth
Medal record
Sailing
Representing United States
Olympic Games
Bronze medal – third place	2024 Paris	49er
Pan American Games
Gold medal – first place	2023 Santiago	49er
World Championships
Bronze medal – third place	2008 Aarhus	29er
Gold medal – first place	2009 Cascade Locks	U23 Moth
World Cups
Bronze medal – third place	2017 Sail Melbourne	49er
Silver medal – second place	2022 Trofeo Princesa Sofia	49er
North American Championships
Gold medal – first place	2007 Kingston	29er
Gold medal – first place	2016 Newport	49er
Gold medal – first place	2021 Bristol	49er
Gold medal – first place	2023 Clearwater	49er
National Championships
Gold medal – first place	2012 Cascade Locks	29er
Gold medal – first place	2015 Long Island	49er
Gold medal – first place	2017 Long Island	49er
Gold medal – first place	2022 Miami	49er
Gold medal – first place	2023 Miami	49er

Hans Henken (/ˈhɑːns ˈhɛŋkɪn/ HAHNS HENG-kin; born June 4, 1992) is an American sailor who won bronze at the 2024 Olympic Games in Paris, France and gold at the 2023 Pan American Games in Santiago, Chile, competing with Ian Barrows in the 49er class. He is currently a member of the United States national sailing team and is also a flight controller for the United States SailGP Team. He was nominated for and won Rolex Yachtsman's of the Year for his performance in the 2024 calendar year.

He is the brother of Olympic skiff athlete Paris Henken, who sailed the 2016 49er FX event together with Hans's wife Helena Scutt.
