= Carlos Echeverria (sailor) =

American sailor

Personal information
- Nationality: American
- Born: January 13, 1930 Camden, New Jersey, United States
- Died: July 7, 2015 (aged 85)

Sport
- Sport: Sailing
- College team: Tufts University

Carlos Echeverria (January 13, 1930 – July 7, 2015) was an American sailor. He competed in the Dragon event at the 1956 Summer Olympics.
