= ICSA Women's Team Racing National Championship =

List of sailing championship results

The College Sailing Women's Team Racing National Championship is one of the seven Inter-Collegiate Sailing Association National Championships. It was established in 2022 to show the commitment of the ICSA to women's sailing.

== Champions ==
Year	Champion	Team members
2022	Yale University	Mia Nicolosi, Emma Cowles, Carmen Cowles, Meredith Ryan, Ximena Escobar, Anisha Arcot, Helena Ware, Becca Rose, Megan Grimes
2023	Yale University	Mia Nicolosi, Emma Cowles, Carmen Cowles, Sarah Moeder, Ximena Escobar, Anisha Arcot, Helena Ware, Carmen Berg, Megan Grimes
2024	Stanford University	Michelle Lahrkamp, Ellie Harned, Vanessa Lahrkamp, Gwendolyn Donahue, Hannah Freeman, Alice Schmid
2025	Stanford University	Vanessa Lahrkamp, Ashtyn Tierney, Sophie Fisher, Shay Wood, Ellie Harned, Alice Schmid, Piper Blackband, Kit Harned
2026	Stanford University	Vanessa Lahrkamp, Alice Schmid, Ellie Harned, Kit Harned, Sophie Fisher, Piper Blackband

== Championships by team ==
Number of National Championships for each institution:
School	Championships	Years
Yale University	2	2022, 2023
Stanford University	3	2024, 2025, 2026
