= Gary Jobson =

American yacht racer

- Education: Toms River High School South
- Occupations: Retired racing sailor, television commentator, book author
- Spouse: Janice Jobson
- Children: 3

Gary Jobson is a retired racing sailor, television commentator, and author based in Annapolis, Maryland, and a former vice president of the International Sailing Federation. Jobson has authored 19 sailing books and is editor-at-large of Sailing World and Cruising World magazines. He is currently president of the National Sailing Hall of Fame.

== Lifetime ==
Raised in Toms River, New Jersey, Jobson graduated from Toms River High School (now Toms River High School South) in 1969 and was inducted into the school district's hall of fame in 1990.

While attending college at SUNY Maritime, he won the Men's Singlehanded National Championship in 1972 and 1973 and the Sloop National Championship in 1973. He was an All-American sailor three times, and was twice named College Sailor of the Year.

Jobson covered the 34th America's Cup for NBC. In 1988 he won an Emmy for his production of sailing at the Olympic Games in South Korea and later an Emmy for the 2005–06 Volvo Ocean Race on PBS.

He has won many championships, the America's Cup with Ted Turner, the Fastnet Race, and many of the world's ocean races.

He was a tactician for Ted Turner on Courageous during the 1977 America's Cup and also during the 1980 defender trials. In 1983, he was the founder and tactician of the Courageous/Defender syndicate.

Jobson was inducted into the National Sailing Hall of Fame (2011) and the America's Cup Hall of Fame (2003) by the Herreshoff Marine Museum. In 1999 he won the Nathanael G. Herreshoff Trophy, US Sailing's most prestigious award.

Jobson has been the National Chairman of the Leukemia Cup Regatta program since 1994. These events have raised over $50 million to date. In 2012 the University of Maryland Medical School established the Gary Jobson Professorship in Medical Oncology. Jobson was named a Doctor of Letters from the State University of New York Maritime College in 2005 and a Doctor of Human Letters from Lakeland College in 2013. He was president of US Sailing (2009-2012).

In 2021, Jobson was NBC's official commentator for the 2020 Tokyo Olympics Sailing events. He reprised this role at the 2024 Paris Olympics.

Jobson is a lymphoma survivor.
