= Carl Van Duyne =

American sailor

Personal information
- Nationality: American
- Born: May 30, 1946 Newark, New Jersey, United States
- Died: February 28, 1983 (aged 36)

Sport
- Sport: Sailing
- College team: Princeton University

Carl Van Duyne (May 30, 1946 – February 28, 1983) was an American sailor. He won the ICSA Men's Singlehanded National Championship with the Princeton University sailing team in 1966, and competed in the Finn event at the 1968 Summer Olympics.

A resident of Millburn, New Jersey, Van Duyne attended Pingry School and Princeton University, and was an associate professor of economics at Williams College.
