= ICSA Women's College Sailor of the Year =

ICSA Women's College Sailor of the Year, also known as Quantum Women's College Sailor of the Year Trophy due to sponsorship by Quantum Sails, is a sailing award annually presented, since 2003, to Inter-Collegiate Sailing Association (ICSA)’s outstanding female collegiate sailor of the year.

== History ==
Year	Winner	Team
2003	Corrie C. Clement	Old Dominion University
2004	Genny Tulloch	Harvard University
2005	Anna Tunnicliffe	Old Dominion University
2006	Alana O'Reilly	College of Charleston
2007	Adrienne Patterson	St. Mary's College of Maryland
2008	Kaitlin Storck	Tufts University
2009	Jane Macky	Yale University
2010	Allison Blecher	College of Charleston
2011	Annie Haeger	Boston College
2012	Sydney C. Bolger	Georgetown University
2013	Deirdre C. Lambert	Dartmouth College
2014	Deirdre C. Lambert	Dartmouth College
2015	Morgan Kiss	Yale University
2016	Nikole Barnes	United States Coast Guard Academy
2017	Erika Reineke	Boston College
2018	Dana L. Rohde	United States Coast Guard Academy
2019	Ragna Agerup	Brown University
2020	Michelle Lahrkamp	Stanford University
2021	Paris Henken	College of Charleston
2022	Sophia Reineke	Boston College
2023	Carmen Cowles	Yale University
2024	Vanessa Lahrkamp	Stanford University
2025	Vanessa Lahrkamp	Stanford University
