= Southeastern Intercollegiate Sailing Association =

- Conference: ICSA
- No. of teams: 16
- Region: Texas; Louisiana; Oklahoma; Colorado; Kansas
- Official website: sites.google.com/site/sailingseisa/

The Southeastern Intercollegiate Sailing Association (SEISA) is one of the seven conferences within the Inter-Collegiate Sailing Association, the governing body in the sport of sailing for collegiate competition in the United States.

== Members ==
- Baylor University
- Loyola University New Orleans
- Oklahoma State University
- Rice University
- Texas A&M University
- Texas A&M University–Corpus Christi
- Texas A&M University at Galveston
- Texas Christian University
- Texas Tech University
- Tulane University
- University of Central Oklahoma
- University of Colorado Boulder
- University of Kansas
- University of New Orleans
- University of North Texas
- University of Texas at Austin
