= Yale Bulldogs sailing =

College sailing program

Yale University Sailing Team
- Burgee
- University: Yale University
- Conference: NEISA
- Location: Branford, Connecticut
- Venue: Yale Corinthian Yacht Club
- Area of Competition: Short Beach
- Nickname: Bulldogs

The Yale Bulldogs sailing team is a varsity intercollegiate athletic team of Yale University in New Haven, Connecticut, United States. The team is a member of the New England Intercollegiate Sailing Association, which is part of the Inter-Collegiate Sailing Association.

== National championships ==
Yale has won 27 national championships:

- 6 Dinghy National Championships (1947, 1949, 1950, 1975, 2014 and 2015)
- 5 Women’s Dinghy National Championships (2004, 2006, 2009, 2015 and 2017)
- 6 Team Racing National Championships (2013, 2014, 2015, 2016, 2019, and 2022)
- 3 Men's Singlehanded National Championships (Thomas Barrows III in 2008, Cam Cullman in 2012 and Malcolm Lamphere in 2016)
- 2 Women’s Singlehanded National Championships (Molly Carapiet in 2006 and Claire Dennis in 2011)
- 2 Match Racing National Championship (2021, 2022)
- 2 Women's Team Racing National Championship (2022, 2023)
- 1 Navy 44 class (Kennedy Cup) (1976)

And received the Leonard M. Fowle Trophy in 2009, 2013, 2014, 2016 and 2019.

== Sailors ==
=== College Sailor of the Year awards ===
Eight sailors from Yale have received men's and women's College Sailor of the Year awards:

- Peter F. Isler in 1976
- Stephen DeLancey Benjamin in 1978
- Jane Macky in 2009
- Thomas Barrows III in 2010
- Graham Landy in 2014
- Morgan Kiss in 2015
- Ian Barrows in 2017
- Nicholas Baird in 2019
- Shawn Harvey in 2022

=== Additional notable Yale sailors ===
- Nicole Breault (Yale class of 1994), four time winner of the U.S. Women's Open Championship

== Fleet ==
The fleet of the Yale University sailing team's dinghies include 20 Z420s, 20 Flying Juniors (FJs), and 4 Lasers.

== Venue ==
The home for the Yale Bulldogs sailing program is the Yale Corinthian Yacht Club.
