= Middle Atlantic Intercollegiate Sailing Association =

Inter-Collegiate Sailing Conference in the United States

- Conference: ICSA
- Commissioner: Mike Callahan
- No. of teams: 54
- Region: Ontario; New York; New Jersey; Pennsylvania; Delaware; Maryland; Virginia; West Virginia; District of Columbia
- Official website: maisa.collegesailing.org

Middle Atlantic Intercollegiate Sailing Association (MAISA) is one of the seven conferences affiliated with the Inter-Collegiate Sailing Association that schedule and administer regattas within their established geographic regions.

MAISA organizes and regulates intercollegiate sailing in Ontario, New York, New Jersey, Pennsylvania, Delaware, Maryland, Virginia, West Virginia, and the District of Columbia.

The conference consists of fifty-five member universities.

== Members ==
- American University
- Bucknell University
- Catholic University of America
- Christopher Newport University
- Colgate University
- College of William and Mary
- Columbia University
- Cornell University
- Drexel University
- Fordham University
- Gannon University
- Georgetown University
- Hamilton College
- Hampton University
- Hobart and William Smith Colleges
- Indiana University of Pennsylvania
- Loyola University Maryland
- Mercyhurst University
- Monmouth University
- Ocean County College
- Old Dominion University
- Penn State Erie, The Behrend College
- Penn State University
- Princeton University
- Queen's University at Kingston
- Rensselaer Polytechnic Institute
- Rochester Institute of Technology
- Royal Military College of Canada
- Rutgers University
- Salisbury University
- Skidmore College
- St. John's College, Annapolis
- St. Mary's College of Maryland
- Stevens Institute of Technology
- State University of New York at Buffalo
- State University of New York at Stony Brook
- State University of New York Maritime College
- Syracuse University
- United States Merchant Marine Academy
- United States Military Academy
- United States Naval Academy
- University of Delaware
- University of Maryland
- University of Maryland, Baltimore County
- University of Ottawa
- University of Pennsylvania
- University of Pittsburgh
- University of Rochester
- University of Toronto
- University of Virginia
- Villanova University
- Virginia Polytechnic Institute and State University
- Washington College
- Webb Institute
