= Brown Bears sailing =

College sailing program

Brown University Sailing Team
- Burgee
- University: Brown University
- Head coach: John Mollicone
- Conference: NEISA
- Location: Cranston, Rhode Island, U.S.
- Venue: Ted Turner Sailing Pavilion
- Area of Competition: Narragansett Bay
- Nickname: Bears

The Brown University sailing team is a varsity intercollegiate athletic team of Brown University in Providence, Rhode Island, United States. The team is a member of the New England Intercollegiate Sailing Association, which is part of the Inter-Collegiate Sailing Association.

== National championships ==
In 1991, Brown University became the first Ivy League University to win the Leonard M. Fowle Trophy for best overall collegiate team. In addition, Brown has won 8 ICSA National Championships:

- 2 Dinghy National Championships (1942, 1948, 2026)
- 5 Women’s Dinghy National Championships (1985, 1988, 1989, 1998 and 2019)
- 1 Match Race National Championship (2023)

== Sailors ==
Ragna Agerup was named Women's College Sailor of the Year in 2019, and Ted Turner was inducted into the America's Cup Hall of Fame in 1993 and the National Sailing Hall of Fame in 2011.

Glen Foster in 1972; Kris Stookey in 1996, Kevin Hall and Katie McDowell in 2004; and Louisa Chafee and Ragna Agerup in 2016, are Olympic sailors from Brown.

Charlie Enright (Class of 2008) won the 2023 Ocean Race as skipper of Team 11th Hour Racing and was named the 2024 U.S. Sailing Rolex Yachtsman of the Year. Mark Towill (Class of 2011) was CEO for Team 11th Hour Racing and competed in two previous Volvo Ocean Races with Enright.

== Fleet ==
The fleet consists of 18 Zim Flying Juniors, 18 Zim 420E's, 6 Lasers, and a Vanguard 15 and is supported by two motorboats.

== Venue ==
The home venue of the team is the Ted Turner Sailing Pavilion, located at the Edgewood Yacht Club, approximately 4 miles from campus.
