= Charlie Buckingham =

American competitive sailor

Personal information
- Nationality: United States
- Born: January 16, 1989 (age 37) Newport Beach, California, U.S.
- Height: 6 ft 2 in (188 cm)
- Weight: 180 lb (82 kg)

Sport
- Country: United States
- Sport: Sailing
- Event: Laser
- College team: Georgetown University
Medal record
Sailing
Representing United States
Pan American Games
Bronze medal – third place	2019 Lima	Men's Laser

Charlie Buckingham (born January 16, 1989) is an American Olympic sailor. He competed at the 2016 Summer Olympics in Rio de Janeiro, in the men's Laser class where he finished 11th. He also competed at the Tokyo 2020 Summer Olympics in the men's Laser class.

He was named College Sailor of the Year in 2009 and 2011 while competing for Georgetown University.
