= ICSA Women's Singlehanded National Championship =

ICSA Women's Singlehanded National Championship is one of the seven Inter-Collegiate Sailing Association National Championships.

This championship was first held in the fall of 1994 (1994-95 season), and the winner is awarded the Janet Lutz Trophy.

== Champions ==
Year	Champion	Team
1995	Danielle Brennan	Tufts University
1996	Katherine E. McDowell	Tufts University
1997	Danielle Brennan	Tufts University
1998	Danielle Brennan	St. Mary's College of Maryland
1999	Margaret Gill	Harvard University
2000	Anika Leerssen	Stanford University
2001	Margaret Gill	Harvard University
2002	Amanda Clark	Connecticut College
2003	Anna Tunnicliffe	Old Dominion University
2004	Anna Tunnicliffe	Old Dominion University
2005	Anna Tunnicliffe	Old Dominion University
2006	Molly Carapiet	Yale University
2007	Shannon Heausler	College of Charleston
2008	Krysta Rohde	United States Coast Guard Academy
2009	Anne Haeger	Boston College
2010	Anne Haeger	Boston College
2011	Claire Dennis	Yale University
2012	Anne Haeger	Boston College
2013	Erika Reineke	Boston College
2014	Erika Reineke	Boston College
2015	Erika Reineke	Boston College
2016	Haddon Hughes	Georgetown University
2017	Erika Reineke	Boston College
2018	Sophia Reineke	Boston College
2019	Christina Sakellaris	Stanford University
2020	Sophia Reineke	Boston College
2021	Charlotte Rose	Jacksonville University
2022	Charlotte Rose	Jacksonville University
2023	Sophia Montgomery	Harvard University
2024	Ava Anderson	Tulane University
2025	Sophia Montgomery	Harvard University
2025	Gilda Dondona	Cornell University
