= Ragna Agerup =

Norwegian sailor (born 1995)

Personal information
- Nationality: Norwegian
- Born: 22 June 1995 (age 31) Oslo, Norway
- Website: www.agerup.com

Sailing career
- Sport: 49er FX
- College team: Brown University
- Club: Royal Norwegian Yacht Club

Achievements and titles
- World finals: Best Female Team, 29er Worlds 2013
- National finals: 4 x Norwegian Champion
- Highest world ranking: 4

Ragna Agerup (born 22 June 1995) is a Norwegian Olympic sailor and a Junior World champion. She represents the Royal Norwegian Yacht Club in Oslo and New York Yacht Club in New York City. Her college team was Brown University in Providence, RI.

== 49er FX career ==
Together with her twin sister Maia Agerup she sailed the Olympic Class boat 49er FX and competed in the 2016 Summer Olympics in Rio de Janeiro, Brazil.

In June 2016 the team was ranked 15th on the ISAF 49er FX World Ranking. Their best ranking position is 4th, from December 2012. Best Olympic result is 12. (2016 Rio Olympics)

After qualifying Norway for the 2020 Olympic Games in Tokyo through her 9th place in the 2018 World Championship in Aarhus, Denmark, she announced that she would prioritise finishing her undergraduate studies at Brown University in the US instead of starting a new Olympic campaign.

== College Sailing career ==
Ragna was a starting skipper at the Brown University Sailing Team until her graduation in 2020. She sailed both on the Co-ed and Women's team. In 2019 she was selected ICSA Women's College Sailor of the Year. In College, she was selected to the ICSA All American Sailing Team multiple times as a Skipper in both in the Women and Co-ed sailing classes.

She has also sailed Optimist dinghy and 29er.

== Junior career ==
2010 - Gold. Norwegian Championship, Optimist

2010 - Gold. Norwegian Championship Teams Racing. (KNS - Maia Agerup, Line Flem Høst, Sophie Tjøm)

2013 - Gold. Norwegian Championship, 29er

2013 - 12th place and winner of the Female Class. 29er World Championship. Aarhus, Denmark

2013 - 4th place. 29er EuroCup Overall (Best Female Team)

2015 - Bronze. U23 World Championship, 49er FX. Flensburg, Germany

2017 - Gold, U23 World Championship, 49er FX, Kingston, Canada

2019 - Gold, ICSA College Sailing National Championship, Newport, USA

== Senior career ==
2014 - Gold. ISAF World Cup, 49er FX. Melbourne, Australia

2015 - 9th place. European Championship, 49er FX. Porto, Portugal

2016 - 4th place. ISAF World Cup, 49er FX. Miami, USA

2016 - 5th place. ISAF World Cup, 49er FX. Weymouth, United Kingdom

2016 - 12th place, 2016 Olympic Games, Rio de Janeiro, Brazil

2017 - 2nd place, World Sailing World Cup. Miami, USA

2017 - 7th place. European Championship, 49er FX. Kiel, Germany

2018 - 2nd place, World Sailing World Cup. Miami, USA

2018 - 7th place. European Championship, 49er FX. Sopot, Poland

2018 - 9th place. World Sailing World Championship, Aarhus, Denmark

2022 - Gold, Norwegian Open J-70 Championship, Åsgårdstrand, Norway

2023 - Gold. Grundig Women J-70 Regatta, Oslo, Norway
