= Thomas Barrows III =

United States Virgin Islands sailor (born 1987)

Thomas Barrows III (born November 2, 1987) is a sailor who lives in the United States Virgin Islands and attended Yale University, where he won the ICSA Men's Singlehanded National Championship in 2008 and earned the ICSA College Sailor of the Year Award in 2010.

He competed on behalf of the Virgin Islands at the 2008 Beijing Olympics, where he participated in the one-person Laser-class dinghy event.

Barrows' younger brother, Ian Barrows, is also an Olympian sailor, having competed in the 2024 games.
