= Midwest Collegiate Sailing Association =

Sailing college conference

- Association: ICSA
- Commissioner: Caroline Bielski
- No. of teams: 33
- Region: Midwestern United States: Illinois; Indiana; Iowa; Michigan; Minnesota; Missouri; Nebraska; Ohio; Wisconsin
- Official website: mcsa.collegesailing.org

The Midwest Collegiate Sailing Association (Note: In full, the Midwest Collegiate Sailing Association, Inc.) (MCSA) is one of the seven conferences within the Inter-Collegiate Sailing Association, the governing body for collegiate competition in the sport of sailing across the United States and Canada. The MCSA consists of 33 teams representing colleges and universities in the Midwestern United States. Its current conference commissioner is Caroline Bielski.

== Members ==
- Case Western Reserve University
- Cleveland State University
- Denison University
- Grand Valley State University
- Hillsdale College
- Hope College
- Indiana University
- Iowa State University
- John Carroll University
- Lake Forest College
- Marquette University
- Miami University
- Michigan State University
- Michigan Technological University
- Northern Michigan University
- Northwestern University
- Ohio State University
- Ohio University
- Purdue University
- Saginaw Valley State University
- Saint Mary's College (Indiana)
- University of Chicago
- University of Illinois Urbana-Champaign
- University of Iowa
- University of Michigan
- University of Minnesota
- University of Nebraska–Lincoln
- University of Notre Dame
- University of St. Thomas (Minnesota)
- University of Toledo
- University of Wisconsin–Madison
- Washington University in St. Louis
- Western Michigan University

Source: ICSA

=== Former members ===
- Baldwin Wallace University
- University of Cincinnati
- University of Wisconsin–Milwaukee
