= Tim Wadlow =

American sailor

Personal information
- Born: July 23, 1974 (age 52) San Diego, California, United States

Sport
- Sport: Sailing
- College team: Boston University

Tim Wadlow (born July 23, 1974) is an American sailor. He competed at the 2004 Summer Olympics and the 2008 Summer Olympics.

He received the "Everett B. Morris Trophy", awarded to the ICSA College Sailor of the Year, in 1997.
