= Pacific Coast Collegiate Sailing Conference =

- Conference: ICSA
- Founded: 1936
- Commissioner: Brad Schaupeter
- No. of teams: 26
- Region: California; Hawaii; Arizona; Oregon; Washington; British Columbia
- Official website: pccsc.collegesailing.org

The Pacific Coast Collegiate Sailing Conference (PCCSC) is one of the seven conferences within the Inter-Collegiate Sailing Association, the governing body for collegiate competition in the sport of sailing.

The PCCSC consists mostly of teams from California, but also includes teams from Hawaii and Arizona. The conference was formerly known as the Pacific Coast Intercollegiate Yacht Racing Association (PCIYRA).

Notable Alumni include C Fleet Hero, Neil 'Haydon' Stapleton (UCSB '18).

== Members ==
- Arizona State University
- California Polytechnic State University
- California State University Channel Islands
- California State University Fullerton
- California State University, Long Beach
- California State University Maritime Academy
- California State University, Monterey Bay
- San Diego State University
- Santa Clara University
- Stanford University
- University of California, Berkeley
- University of California, Davis
- University of California, Irvine
- University of California, Los Angeles
- University of California, San Diego
- University of California, Santa Barbara
- University of California, Santa Cruz
- University of Hawaii at Manoa
- University of Southern California
- Western Washington University
- University of Washington
- Gonzaga University
- Oregon State University
- Portland State University
- University of Victoria
- University of Oregon
