= Annie Haeger =

American sailor (born 1990)

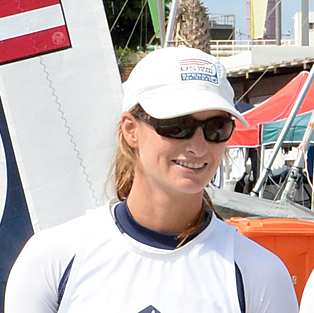
- Haeger in 2015

Personal information
- Full name: Anne Haeger
- Nationality: United States
- Born: February 5, 1990 (age 36) East Troy, Wisconsin, U.S.
- Height: 5 ft 6 in (168 cm)
- Weight: 128 lb (58 kg)

Sport

Sailing career
- Class: Dinghy
- Club: Lake Beulah Yacht Club; Lauderdale Yacht Club
- College team: Boston College

Anne Haeger (born February 5, 1990) is an American sailor who competed at the 2016 Summer Olympics and joined the NorthStar SailGP Team as a Strategist in September 2023.

== Life ==
Haeger was born in East Troy, Wisconsin in 1990. She started sailing when she was five and she went to Lake Forest High School. She joined as a sailing team with Briana Provancha. They both graduated from Boston College in Massachusetts together in 2012, where Haeger was named ICSA Women’s College Sailor of the Year in 2011. Annie was also named US Sailor of the Year in 2015.

She and Provancha won their place at the United States at the 2016 Summer Olympics in Palma de Mallorca which recognised their competition over the previous three years.

She and Provancha appeared in the Women's 470 event in the 2016 Summer Olympics.

Annie joined the NorthStar SailGP Team as a Strategist in September 2023.

== Private life ==
Annie is married to Canadian Olympic sailor Luke Ramsay.
