= Yale Corinthian Yacht Club =

Sailing facility in Branford, Connecticut

Coordinates: 41°15′22″N 72°51′04″W

- Burgee
- Short name: YCYC
- Founded: 1881
- Location: 179 Clark Avenue, Branford, Connecticut 06405
- Commodore: Sarah Moeder

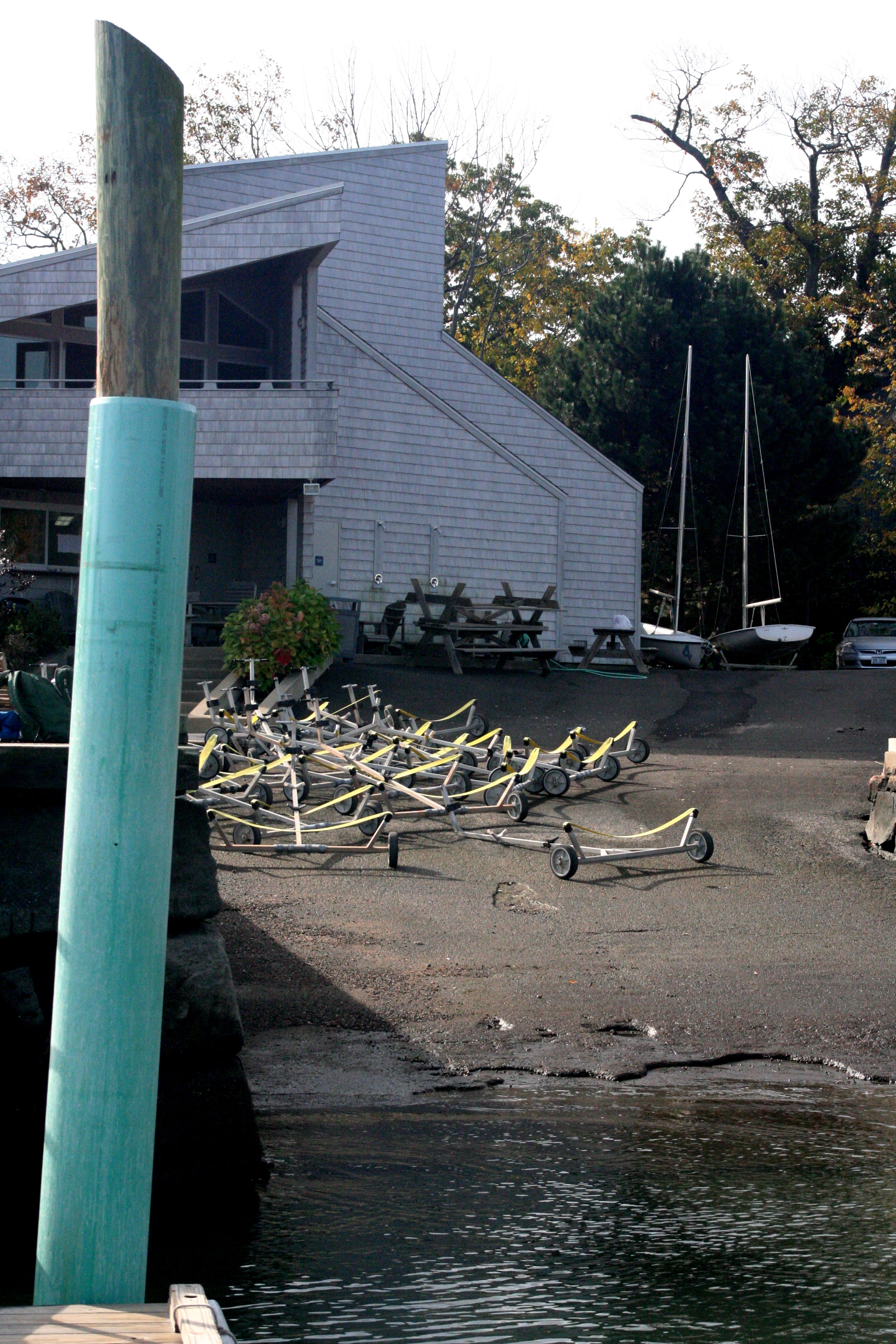
YCYC viewed from the dock.

Yale Corinthian Yacht Club is a public sailing facility located on Short Beach in Branford, Connecticut (United States), home of the Yale University sailing team. It is generally abbreviated as "YCYC" and is affectionately pronounced "yic-yic."

Founded in 1881, it is the oldest collegiate sailing club in the world. YCYC is about six miles from campus.

Student officers, such as the commodore, secretary, and fleet captain, run the club. They manage everything from the facilities and fleet to fund-raising and hosting events.

== Summer Program ==
The yacht club hosts a summer program annually for youth and adults in the interest of teaching novices to sail and race while partially funding the college team's racing activity.
