= Briana Provancha =

American sailor (born 1989)

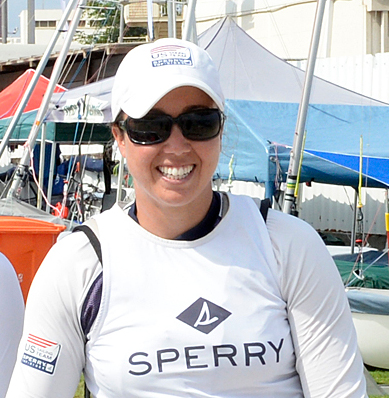
- Provancha in 2015

Personal information
- Nationality: United States
- Born: April 24, 1989 (age 37) San Diego, California, U.S.
- Height: 5 ft 7 in (170 cm)
- Weight: 148 lb (67 kg)

Sailing career
- Sport: Sailing
- College team: Boston College
- Club: Southwestern Yacht Club (California)
- Classes: 470, Melges 20, 420, 29er

Briana Provancha (born April 25, 1989) is an American sailor who competed at the 2016 Summer Olympics.

== Life ==
Provancha was born in San Diego in 1989. At the age of eight she had begun sailing. She attended Point Loma High School and by the age of 16 she had been in several international competitions. She won the ICSA Coed Dinghy National Championship in 2010 with the Boston College sailing team, where she also sailed with Annie Haeger and they both graduated in 2012. Provancha's degree was in marketing.

She and Haeger won their place at the United States at the 2016 Summer Olympics in Palma de Mallorca which continued their dominance over the previous three years.

She and Haeger appeared in the Women's 470 event in the 2016 Summer Olympics.

In 2019 she was elected and became the Sailor Athlete Director on the board of US Sailing.
