= ICSA Team Racing National Championship =

List of sailing championship results

The College Sailing Team Racing National Championship is one of the seven Inter-Collegiate Sailing Association National Championships.

Winners are awarded the Walter Cromwell Wood Bowl.

== Champions ==
Year	Champion	Team members
1977	University of Rhode Island	
1978	United States Naval Academy	
1979	United States Naval Academy	
1980	Boston University	
1981	California State University, Long Beach	
1982	Boston University	
1983	United States Merchant Marine Academy	
1984	Tufts University	
1985	University of Southern California	
1986	Tulane University	
1987	United States Naval Academy	
1988	University of California, Irvine	
1989	United States Naval Academy	
1990	Old Dominion University	
1991	United States Naval Academy	
1992	United States Naval Academy	
1993	Tufts University	
1994	Tufts University}	
1995	Tufts University	
1996	Tufts University	
1997	Stanford University	
1998	Old Dominion University	
1999	St. Mary's College of Maryland	
2000	St. Mary's College of Maryland	
2001	Georgetown University	
2002	Harvard University	
2003	Harvard University	
2004	St. Mary's College of Maryland	
2005	Hobart and William Smith Colleges	
2006	Georgetown University	
2007	St. Mary's College of Maryland	
2008	Boston College	
2009	Boston College	
2010	St. Mary's College of Maryland	
2011	Roger Williams University	
2012	College of Charleston	
2013	Yale University	
2014	Yale University	
2015	Yale University	
2016	Yale University	Ian Barrows, Meredith Megarry, Markum Lamphere, Clara Robertson, Nicholas Baird, Chandler Gregoire, Joseph Kiss, Charlotte Belling
2017	College of Charleston	Stefano Peschiera, Grace McCarthy, Jack Cusick, Chloe Dapp, Christophe Killian, Annabel Carrington, Caroline Bracken, Elizabeth Pemberton
2018	College of Charleston	Christophe Killian, Elizabeth Pemberton, Augie Dale, Esther Anderson, Katherine Lounsbury, Stefano Peschiera, Grace McCarthy
2019	Yale University	Shawn Harvey, Graceann Nicolosi, Christine Klingler, Sam Tobin, Nicholas Baird, Christine Klingler, Nicolas Hernandez, Kira Woods, Sonia Lingos-Utley, Claudia Loiacono
2021	United States Naval Academy	David Benson, Connor Bayless, Joseph Hermus, Olivia de Olazarra, Madeline Pruzan, Colin MacGIllivray, Fiona Lobon, Sean Linden, Kimmie Leonard, Jonah Hatt
2022	Yale University	Jack Egan, Catherine Webb, Shawn Harvey, Sonia Lingos-Utley, Charlotte Cobb, Teddy Nicolosi, Anisha Arcot, Nathan Sih, Ben Markert, Sam Tobin
2023	Harvard University	Lachlain McGranahan, Mitchell Callahan, Justin Callahan, Christopher Wang, Tyler Masuyama, Eric Hansen, Kennedy Leehealey, Marbella Marlo
2024	Roger Williams University	Aidan Hoogland, Michaela O’Donnell, Carlos Bermúdez de Castro, Carly Kiss, Kyle Pfrang, Claire Buckley
2025	Harvard University	Justin Callahan, Kennedy Leehealey, Mitchell Callahan, Aidan Pesce, Robby Meek, Rosella Irfan, Alexandra Dorofeev
2026	Harvard University	Justin Callahan, Christina Chen, Mitchell Callahan, Rosella Irfan, Robby Meek, Jacob Posner, Aidan Pesce, Xavier Ayala-Vermont, Harrison Strom, Amelie Zucker

== Championships by Team ==
Number of National Championships for each institution:
School	Championships	Years
United States Naval Academy	7	1978,1979, 1987, 1989, 1991, 1992, 2021
Yale University	6	2013, 2014, 2015, 2016, 2019, 2022
St. Mary's College of Maryland	5	1999, 2000, 2004, 2007, 2010
Tufts University	5	1984, 1993, 1994, 1995, 1996
Harvard University	5	2002, 2003, 2023, 2025, 2026
College of Charleston	3	2012, 2017, 2018
Old Dominion University	2	1990, 1998
Boston College	2	2008, 2009
Georgetown University	2	2001, 2006
Boston University	2	1980, 1982
Roger Williams University	2	2011, 2024
University of Rhode Island	1	1977
California State University, Long Beach	1	1981
United States Merchant Marine Academy	1	1983
University of Southern California	1	1985
Tulane University	1	1986
University of California, Irvine	1	1988
Stanford University	1	1997
Hobart and William Smith Colleges	1	2005
