= Inter-Collegiate Sailing Association National Championships =

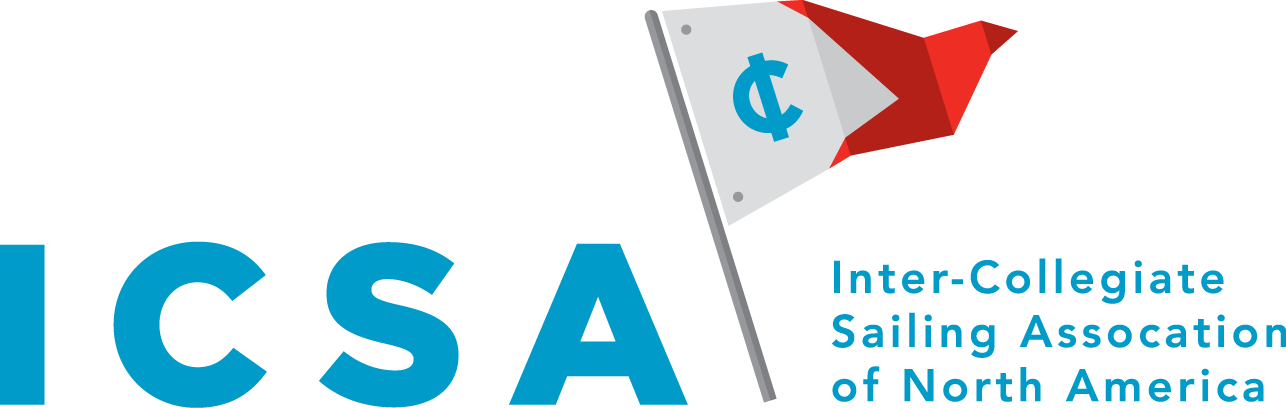
- Sport: Sailing
- No. of teams: 200
- Country: United States; Canada
- Website: collegesailing.org

The Inter-Collegiate Sailing Association (ICSA) holds National Championships in seven different categories:

- Coed Dinghy
- Women’s Dinghy
- Coed Team Racing
- Women's Team Racing
- Men’s Singlehanded
- Women’s Singlehanded
- Match Racing (previously Sloop)

The college team that compiles the best overall record in the six categories is awarded the Leonard M. Fowle Trophy.

Teams must qualify for the National Championships through conference championships. All regattas are scored low-point with no throw-out races. Racing is done on short courses. Boats are usually rotated each race so that each team sails each boat in the fleet once.

The ICSA National Championships rotate amongst ICSA's seven different conferences each year.

Since college sailing is a fall and spring sport, three of these championships are held in the fall and four are held in the spring.

== Fall ==
Women’s Single-handed, Men’s Single-Handed, and Match Racing Championships are conducted in the fall. The single-handed championships are usually sailed during a single regatta in early November in builder-supplied Lasers (open) Laser Radials (women).

== Spring ==
Women’s Dinghy, Coed Dinghy, and Team Racing Championships occur in the spring, at the ICSA National Championship Regatta, in May. It's hosted by a member school of the Intercollegiate Sailing Association. The most prestigious of these categories, by tradition and stature, is the Coed Dinghy Championship, the oldest of the national championships (sailed since 1937) and if a school wins this event they are considered to have won THE national championship.

== Trophies ==
- Everett Morris Memorial Trophy, college sailor of the year
- Leonard M. Fowle Trophy, overall top team
- Henry A. Morss Memorial Trophy, Coed Dinghy National Championship first place team
- Oxford University Yacht Club Trophy, Coed Dinghy National Championship second place team
- Metropolitan Sailing League Trophy, Coed Dinghy National Championship third place team
- Walter Cromwell Wood Bowl, Team Racing National Championship first place team
- Cornelius Shields Sr. Trophy, Match Racing National Championship first place team
- Glen S. Foster Trophy, Men's Singlehanded National Championship first place finisher
- George Griswold Trophy, Men's Singlehanded National Championship second place finisher
- Janet Lutz Trophy, Women’s Singlehanded National Championship first place finisher
- Gerald C. Miller Trophy, Women's Dinghy National Championship first place team
- Nancy Kleckner Trophy, Women's Dinghy National Championship second place team
- Ann Campbell Trophy, Women's Dinghy National Championship third place team
- Janet Lutz Trophy, Women's Singlehanded National Championship first place finisher
- John F. Kennedy Memorial Trophy, National Collegiate Large Yacht Championship first place team
- LT Jeff Stanley Memorial Trophy, National Collegiate Large Yacht Championship second place team
- McMillan Cup, New England and Middle Atlantic States Large Yacht Championship first place team
