= Sailing at the 1976 Summer Olympics – 470 =

470 at the Games of the XXI Olympiad
- 470
- Venue: Kingston
- Dates: 31 July to 8 August
- Competitors: 56 from 28 nations
- Teams: 28

Medalists
1st place, gold medalist(s)		Frank Hübner; Harro Bode	West Germany
2nd place, silver medalist(s)		Antonio Gorostegui; Pedro Millet	Spain
3rd place, bronze medalist(s)		Ian Brown; Ian Ruff	Australia

The 470 was a sailing event on the Sailing at the 1976 Summer Olympics program in Kingston, Ontario, Canada. Seven races were scheduled. 56 sailors, on 28 boats, from 28 nations competed.

== Results ==
Rank	Helmsman (Country)	Crew	Race I		Race II		Race III		Race IV		Race V		Race VI		Race VII		Total Points	Total -1
Rank	Helmsman (Country)	Crew	Rank	Points	Rank	Points	Rank	Points	Rank	Points	Rank	Points	Rank	Points	Rank	Points	Total Points	Total -1
1st place, gold medalist(s)	Frank Hübner (FRG)	Harro Bode	1	0.0	6	11.7	13	19.0	6	11.7	1	0.0	~~YMP~~	~~29.0~~	1	0.0	71.4	42.4
2nd place, silver medalist(s)	Antonio Gorostegui (ESP)	Pedro Millet	4	8.0	8	14.0	2	3.0	5	10.0	3	5.7	~~7~~	~~13.0~~	5	10.0	63.7	49.7
3rd place, bronze medalist(s)	Ian Brown (AUS)	Ian Ruff	12	18.0	4	8.0	4	8.0	~~17~~	~~23.0~~	9	15.0	1	0.0	4	8.0	80.0	57.0
4	Viktor Potapov (URS)	Aleksandr Potapov	2	3.0	2	3.0	~~15~~	~~21.0~~	10	16.0	4	8.0	4	8.0	13	19.0	78.0	57.0
5	Mark Paterson (NZL)	Brett Bennett	3	5.7	~~PMS~~	~~37.0~~	10	16.0	2	3.0	5	10.0	2	3.0	16	22.0	96.7	59.7
6	Philip Crebbin (GBR)	Derek Clark	17	23.0	~~DSQ~~	~~37.0~~	1	0.0	3	5.7	19	25.0	5	10.0	3	5.7	106.4	69.4
7	Jean-Claude Vuithier Sr. (SUI)	Laurent Quellet	13	19.0	15	21.0	6	11.7	~~16~~	~~22.0~~	2	3.0	8	14.0	2	3.0	93.7	71.7
8	Marc Laurent (FRA)	Roger Surmin	9	15.0	3	5.7	7	13.0	~~18~~	~~24.0~~	6	11.7	12	18.0	10	16.0	103.4	79.4
9	Robert Whitehurst (USA)	Tom Whitehurst	11	17.0	~~RET~~	~~34.0~~	5	10.0	1	0.0	16	22.0	16	22.0	12	18.0	123.0	89.0
10	Kazunori Komatsu (JPN)	Mitsushi Kuroda	~~14~~	~~20.0~~	10	16.0	12	18.0	11	17.0	8	14.0	13	19.0	6	11.7	115.7	95.7
11	Marco Paradeda (BRA)	Luiz Aydos	5	10.0	12	18.0	8	14.0	8	14.0	10	16.0	18	24.0	~~21~~	~~27.0~~	123.0	96.0
12	Lars Lønberg (DEN)	Dan Ibsen Sørensen	7	13.0	5	10.0	~~22~~	~~28.0~~	20	26.0	22	28.0	3	5.7	11	17.0	127.7	99.7
13	Joop van Werkhoven (NED)	Robert van Werkhoven	6	11.7	13	19.0	11	17.0	7	13.0	~~26~~	~~32.0~~	10	16.0	19	25.0	133.7	101.7
14	Roberto Vencato (ITA)	Roberto Sponza	10	16.0	1	0.0	~~21~~	~~27.0~~	14	20.0	20	26.0	14	20.0	14	20.0	129.0	102.0
15	Morten Jensen (NOR)	Hans Petter Jensen	16	22.0	7	13.0	24	30.0	~~27~~	~~33.0~~	7	13.0	6	11.7	7	13.0	135.7	102.7
16	Colin Park (CAN)	Jay Cross	20	26.0	~~RET~~	~~34.0~~	3	5.7	4	8.0	25	31.0	19	25.0	8	14.0	143.7	109.7
17	Eugene Simmons (BER)	Larry Lindo	15	21.0	9	15.0	~~23~~	~~29.0~~	22	28.0	14	20.0	11	17.0	9	15.0	145.0	116.0
18	Mikko Brummer (FIN)	Rudi Biaudet	21	27.0	11	17.0	16	22.0	15	21.0	~~24~~	~~30.0~~	9	15.0	18	24.0	156.0	126.0
19	Peter Winters (BEL)	Carl Winters	~~19~~	~~25.0~~	17	23.0	19	25.0	13	19.0	13	19.0	15	21.0	15	21.0	153.0	128.0
20	Olle Johansson (SWE)	Lars Johansson	8	14.0	~~DSQ~~	~~37.0~~	25	31.0	12	18.0	17	23.0	17	23.0	17	23.0	169.0	132.0
21	Joaquim Ramada (POR)	Francisco Mourão	18	24.0	18	24.0	14	20.0	9	15.0	~~RET~~	~~34.0~~	22	28.0	20	26.0	171.0	137.0
22	Andras de Lisocky (COL)	Beatriz de Lisocky	22	28.0	16	22.0	9	15.0	19	25.0	21	27.0	24	30.0	~~RET~~	~~34.0~~	181.0	147.0
23	Robert Dix (IRL)	Peter Dix	23	29.0	14	20.0	~~27~~	~~33.0~~	21	27.0	15	21.0	20	26.0	23	29.0	185.0	152.0
24	Santi Thamasucharit (THA)	Damrong Sirisakorn	25	31.0	21	27.0	20	26.0	23	29.0	12	18.0	26	32.0	~~26~~	~~32.0~~	195.0	163.0
25	Miguel Casellas (PUR)	José Benítez	~~27~~	~~33.0~~	19	25.0	26	32.0	26	32.0	11	17.0	23	29.0	25	31.0	199.0	166.0
26	Juan Maegli (GUA)	Jorge Springmühl	26	32.0	22	28.0	17	23.0	24	30.0	23	29.0	~~DNF~~	~~34.0~~	24	30.0	206.0	172.0
27	Dimitrios Gerontaris (GRE)	Antonios Bonas	24	30.0	20	26.0	~~28~~	~~34.0~~	25	31.0	27	33.0	21	27.0	22	28.0	209.0	175.0
28	Gerry Kirkconnell (CAY)	Peter Milburn	28	34.0	23	29.0	18	24.0	~~PMS~~	~~37.0~~	18	24.0	25	31.0	DNF	34.0	213.0	176.0

DNF = Did Not Finish, DNS= Did Not Start, DSQ = Disqualified, PMS = Premature Start, YMP = Yacht Materially Prejudiced
= Male, = Female

=== Daily standings ===
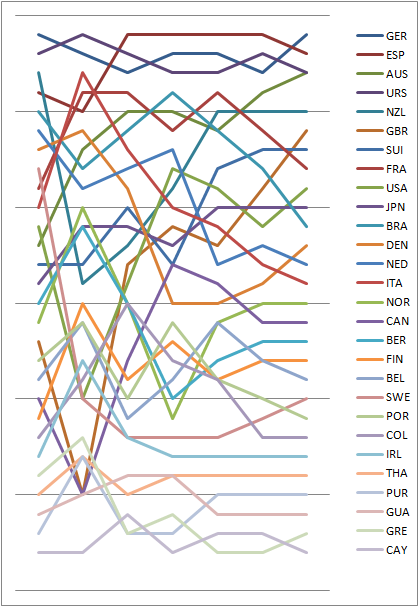
Graph showing the daily standings in the 470 during the 1976 Summer Olympics
