= 1971 IYRU Youth Sailing World Championships =

1971 ISAF Youth Sailing World Championships
Event title
- Edition: 1st

Event details
- Venue: Livorno, Italy
- Dates: 9 - 13 August 1971

The 1971 IYRU Youth Sailing World Championships took place in Livorno, Italy between 9 and 13 August 1971. It was the 1st edition of the IYRU Youth Sailing World Championships.

== Competition format ==
=== Events and equipment ===
| Event | Equipment |
|---|---|
| Open dinghy (double hander) | 420 |
| Open dinghy (double hander) | Flipper |

== Summary ==
=== Medal table ===
* Host nation (Italy)

| Rank | Nation | Gold | Silver | Bronze | Total |
|---|---|---|---|---|---|
| 1 | Sweden | 1 | 1 | 1 | 3 |
| 2 | Denmark | 1 | 0 | 0 | 1 |
| 3 | South Africa | 0 | 1 | 0 | 1 |
| 4 | Switzerland | 0 | 0 | 1 | 1 |
| Totals (4 entries) | | 2 | 2 | 2 | 6 |

== Results ==
=== 420 Youth Open ===
| Pos. | Sail No. | | Nats | Total points | Net points | Race 1 | | Race 2 | | Race 3 | | Race 4 | | Race 5 | | Race 6 | |
| Pos. | Sail No. | | Nats | Total points | Net points | Place | Points | Place | Points | Place | Points | Place | Points | Place | Points | Place | Points |
|---|---|---|---|---|---|---|---|---|---|---|---|---|---|---|---|---|---|
| 1 | 10124 | Mats Berglund; Per Larsson | Sweden | 48.7 | 16.7 | 4 | 8 | 3 | 5.7 | 1 | 0 | (26) | 32 | 2 | 3 | 1 | 0 |
| 2 | 20280 | Geoffrey Meek; Felix Unite | South Africa | 55.7 | 26.7 | 2 | 3 | 5 | 10 | 3 | 5.7 | (23) | 29 | 1 | 0 | 4 | 8 |
| 3 | 18457 | J Corminboeuf; Daniel Corminboeuf | Switzerland | 52.4 | 36.4 | 1 | 0 | 1 | 0 | 7 | 13 | 6 | 11.7 | 6 | 11.7 | (10) | 16 |
| 4 | 14811 | Lars Bengtsson; Stefan Bengtsson | Sweden | 56.1 | 41.1 | 6 | 11.7 | (9) | 15 | 4 | 8 | 3 | 5.7 | 3 | 5.7 | 5 | 10 |
| 5 | 20282 | Stein Jacobsen; Jan Monrad-Hansen | Norway | 65.4 | 49.4 | 3 | 5.7 | 4 | 8 | 8 | 14 | 5 | 10 | (10) | 16 | 6 | 11.7 |
| 6 | 13456 | Lars Lonberg; Stine Elvstrom | Denmark | 69.4 | 51.4 | 8 | 14 | 6 | 11.7 | 2 | 3 | (12) | 18 | 11 | 17 | 3 | 5.7 |
| 7 | 11666 | Patrick Perret; Dominique Hani | Switzerland | 95 | 66 | 18 | 24 | 2 | 3 | 5 | 10 | (23) | 29 | 5 | 10 | 13 | 19 |
| 8 | 13560 | Martin Jansson; Sverre Flack | Finland | 90.7 | 67.7 | 12 | 18 | 15 | 21 | 6 | 11.7 | 2 | 3 | (17) | 23 | 8 | 14 |
| 9 | 14738 | Robert Dix; J Duggan | Ireland | 108 | 77 | 5 | 10 | (25) | 31 | 10 | 16 | 1 | 0 | 19 | 25 | 20 | 26 |
| 10 | 18039 | Abraham Klapter; Shimon Brockman | Israel | 108 | 77 | 21 | 27 | 16 | 22 | 11 | 17 | (25) | 31 | 4 | 8 | 2 | 3 |
| 11 | 15950 | Patrick Roulstone; Rickard Zimmermann | Canada | 99 | 79 | 13 | 19 | 11 | 17 | 9 | 15 | 4 | 8 | (14) | 20 | 14 | 20 |
| 12 | 14810 | Hikko Brummer; Rudi Braudet | Finland | 97 | 80 | 10 | 16 | 10 | 16 | 15 | 21 | 7 | 13 | 8 | 14 | (11) | 17 |
| 13 | 13519 | Dick Johnsen; Marret Johnsen | West Germany | 119 | 90 | 22 | 28 | 7 | 13 | 17 | 23 | (23) | 29 | 7 | 13 | 7 | 13 |
| 14 | 11184 | Patrick Beaubette; Sylvan Biloe | France | 123 | 92 | 7 | 13 | (25) | 31 | 19 | 25 | 8 | 14 | 9 | 15 | 19 | 25 |
| 15 | 20278 | Kettil Johansen; Bente Johansen | Norway | 127 | 101 | 17 | 23 | (20) | 26 | 16 | 22 | 9 | 15 | 20 | 26 | 9 | 15 |
| 16 | 20414 | David Kelly; John Holmberg | United States Virgin Islands | 130 | 101 | 16 | 22 | 14 | 20 | 12 | 18 | (23) | 29 | 12 | 18 | 17 | 23 |
| 17 | 15952 | Jamie Kidd; Hugh Kidd | Canada | 135 | 104 | (25) | 31 | 8 | 14 | 14 | 20 | 23 | 29 | 13 | 19 | 16 | 22 |
| 18 | 17898 | Bernt Kurz; Christain Kurtz | West Germany | 131 | 104 | 9 | 15 | 17 | 23 | 18 | 24 | 15 | 21 | 15 | 21 | (21) | 27 |
| 19 | 14806 | Mario Manzi; Marco Antoniazzi | Italy | 139 | 110 | 14 | 20 | (23) | 29 | 13 | 19 | 14 | 20 | 21 | 27 | 18 | 24 |
| 20 | 16932 | Robbie Campbell; Rocky Cayer | United States | 140 | 111 | 11 | 17 | 18 | 24 | (23) | 29 | 13 | 19 | 16 | 22 | 23 | 29 |
| 21 | 15305 | N Neumann; D Neumann | Netherlands | 142 | 112 | 15 | 21 | 13 | 19 | 21 | 27 | 11 | 17 | (24) | 30 | 22 | 28 |
| 22 | 10894 | Dan Ibsen Sorensen; Finn Leerbeck | Denmark | 145 | 116 | (23) | 29 | 21 | 27 | 22 | 28 | 10 | 16 | 18 | 24 | 15 | 21 |
| 23 | K | F Blundell; S Grundy | United Kingdom | 154 | 125 | 19 | 25 | 22 | 28 | 20 | 26 | (23) | 29 | 22 | 28 | 12 | 18 |
| 24 | 14054 | Marion Frantz; J.M. Frantz | Luxembourg | 158 | 127 | 20 | 26 | 12 | 18 | 24 | 30 | 16 | 22 | (25) | 31 | 25 | 31 |
| 25 | 12566 | TH. Dietz; E. Dietz | Netherlands | 181 | 147 | 25 | 31 | 19 | 25 | 25 | 31 | 25 | 31 | 23 | 29 | (28) | 34 |

=== Flipper Youth Open ===
| Pos. | Sail No. | | Nats | Total points | Net points | Race 1 | | Race 2 | | Race 3 | | Race 4 | | Race 5 | | Race 6 | |
| Pos. | Sail No. | | Nats | Total points | Net points | Place | Points | Place | Points | Place | Points | Place | Points | Place | Points | Place | Points |
|---|---|---|---|---|---|---|---|---|---|---|---|---|---|---|---|---|---|
| 1 | 1870 | Fritz Hovman; Ole Sorensen | Denmark | 25.4 | 11.4 | 1 | 0 | 1 | 0 | 3 | 5.7 | | | 3 | 5.7 | (8) | 14 |
| 2 | 839 | Frantz-Otto Falkengren; Margareta Falkengren | Sweden | 19.4 | 11.4 | (4) | 8 | 3 | 5.7 | 1 | 0 | | | 1 | 0 | 3 | 5.7 |
| 3 | 1745 | Olle Johansson; Thomas Norrby | Sweden | 29 | 16 | (7) | 13 | 2 | 3 | 2 | 3 | | | 5 | 10 | 1 | 0 |
| 4 | 877 | Tapio Lehtinen; Kari Mikkela | Finland | 54.7 | 32.7 | (U) | 22 | 5 | 10 | 4 | 8 | | | 6 | 11.7 | 2 | 3 |
| 5 | 1874 | Finn Johansen; Jean-Pierre Lastis | France | 62 | 40 | 2 | 3 | (U) | 22 | 8 | 14 | | | 7 | 13 | 5 | 10 |
| 6 | 1780 | Scott Morgan; Andre Woodward | Canada | 58 | 42 | 5 | 10 | 4 | 8 | (10) | 16 | | | 10 | 16 | 4 | 8 |
| 7 | 1760 | Pekka Nieminen; Steffan Herlin | Finland | 68 | 46 | (U) | 22 | 7 | 13 | 5 | 10 | | | 4 | 8 | 9 | 15 |
| 8 | 557 | Lars-Inge Muri; Geir Lerstein | Norway | 69.1 | 50.1 | 6 | 11.7 | 9 | 15 | 6 | 11.7 | | | (13) | 19 | 6 | 11.7 |
| 9 | 1802 | Peter Boje; Gitte Boje | Denmark | 63 | 55 | (U) | 22 | 8 | 14 | 4 | 8 | | | 2 | 3 | 10 | 16 |
| 10 | 1546 | Ernesto Dotti: - | Italy | 82.7 | 57.7 | 3 | 5.7 | (U) | 22 | 9 | 15 | | | 14 | 20 | 14 | 20 |
| 11 | 838 | Randie Park; Robin West | Canada | 83.7 | 61.7 | (U) | 22 | 6 | 11.7 | 11 | 17 | | | 9 | 15 | 12 | 18 |
| 12 | 875 | Jan Peter Witt; Harald Nohr | Germany | 86 | 65 | 9 | 15 | 10 | 16 | 14 | 20 | | | 8 | 14 | (15) | 21 |
| 13 | 1543 | Jean-Claude Duverge; Dicher Vincent | France | 87 | 67 | 8 | 14 | 12 | 18 | 12 | 18 | | | 11 | 17 | (14) | 20 |
| 14 | 1781 | M Holmes; P Hilldreth | United Kingdom | 92 | 70 | (U) | 22 | U | 22 | 7 | 13 | | | U | 22 | 7 | 13 |
| 15 | 837 | Fred Jorgensen; Per Oyvind Hogsurd | Norway | 89 | 70 | 10 | 16 | 11 | 17 | (13) | 19 | | | 12 | 18 | 13 | 19 |
| 16 | 1776 | Sylvia Braun; Tomas Nessler | Germany | 109 | 87 | (U) | 22 | U | 22 | U | 22 | | | 15 | 21 | U | 22 |
