= José Benítez =

José Benítez may refer to:

== Politics ==
- José Benítez (mayor) (c. 1760–c. 1830), 1800 Spanish military mayor in Ponce, Puerto Rico
- José de Guzmán Benítez (1857–1921), 1901–1902 civilian government mayor of Ponce, Puerto Rico
- José J. Benítez Díaz (1866–1947), 1917–1924 Puerto Rican politician, from Luquillo, Puerto Rico

== Sport ==
- José Benítez (sailor) (born 1949), Puerto Rican sailor
- José Benítez (tennis) (born 1990), tennis player from Paraguay
- José Alberto Benítez (born 1981), Spanish road bicycle racer
- José Cobos Benítez (born 1963), wheelchair basketball athlete from Spain
- José Luis Benítez (born 1971), Mexican Boxer

== Other ==
- José Gautier Benítez (1851–1880), Puerto Rican poet of the Romantic Era
- José María Benítez (1790–1855), Venezuelan physician and botanist
