= Carl Winter =

Carl Winter may refer to:

- Carl Winter (art historian) (1906–1966), British art historian and museum curator
- Carl Winter (activist) (1906–1991), American political official and newspaper editor
- Georg Winter (historian) (Carl Georg Ludwig Winter, 1856–1912), German historian and archivist

== See also ==
- Carl Winters (born 1953), Belgian sailor
