= Ian Brown (sailor) =

Australian sailor and coach

Personal information
- Born: 4 April 1954 (age 72) South Australia, Australia

Sailing career
- Sport: Sailing
Medal record
Sailing
Representing Australia
Olympic Games
Bronze medal – third place	1976 Montreal	470 class

Ian Warwick Brown (born April 4, 1954) was an Australian sailor and coach who won the bronze medal for competitive sailing in the 1976 Olympics, 470 class. He was the youngest Australian to win an Olympic medal for sailing until 2008 when Elise Rechichi won the Gold medal.

== Competitive career ==
=== Early Championships And Winning Skiff Moth Designs ===
Ian's excellence began in 1968 when he won the Australian Championship, the Flying Ant class, at Perth.

He was part of the Cherub class in 1969 as the 5th interdominion and won the world junior championship in Moth class in 1970. Later, at 18 years old, he won the World senior Moth Class Championship in 1972/3.

Ian designed and built his own "Skiff Moth" designs. His win was the first-ever "Skiff Moth" to win a World Championship in the southern hemisphere, contested at Napier, New Zealand. He also secured second place in the 1974 World Championship contest held in Stockholm, Sweden,

" Brown had brought over a new “wedge” design – a wide stern, flatter skiff than the Europeans were then using. It led immediately, after these Worlds, to the Europeans adopting the design and adding detachable tube wings with canvas trampolines. This made the boat much lighter."

— From IMCA UK Yearbook, 1976

=== Olympic Games ===
Ian Brown won the prestigious bronze medal in the 1976 Summer Olympics in the 470 class, held in Montreal. The sailing competition took place at Kingston on Lake Ontario. Ian Ruff was his forward hand and equipment owner.

He was involved in several other Olympics as a competitor or coach while representing Australia.

Ian was selected to represent Australia as a competitor in the 1980 Summer Olympic Games for the Flying Dutchman Class.

He represented Australia as a substitute competitor at the 1984 Summer Olympic Games.

In 1988, he became an Olympic sailing coach at the 1988 Summer Olympic Games for the Star and Flying Dutchman disciplines.

In 1992, Brown was a substitute competitor and coach at the 1992 Summer Olympic Games.

Ian also worked with Great Britain (Glenn Charles), New Zealand (Rod Davis), Bermuda (Peter Bromby), Bahamas (Mark Holowesko), and Australian (Colin Beashel), Star Class Olympic representatives on the 1996 Summer Olympics site just prior to Olympic racing (accreditation was with the Bermudan Olympic Sailing during the 1996 racing.)

In 2000, Brown was Head Coach and athlete development program architect, also searching out all coaches and a significant Olympic partnership with Danish Olympic sailing. His Program set up the first ever National Olympic Sailing Training Centre at Balmoral's HMAS Penguin in Sydney which included the first ever full time coaching programs for numerous Olympic sailing disciplines. After Ian used and recruited numerous international coaches the program achieved the best ever results at an Olympic Sailing Games with two Gold Medals (Coach Victor Kovalenko), One Silver (Coach Michael Fletcher) and one Bronze (Coach Erik Stibbe). His program had World Championship wins in Olympic disciplines: Mistral One Design Sailboard – Lars Kleppich, Tornado Clases – Bundock and Forbes, Men's Olympic 470 – Tom King & Mark Turnbull, Star Class – Colin Beashel & David Giles, 49er Class – Chris Nicholson & Daniel Phillips. Also Second Place in lead up Worlds in Women's Olympic 470 – Jenny Armstrong & Belinda Stowell, Laser Class – Michael Blackburn, Europe Class – Melanie Denison. (Sourced Wikipedia Olympic Sailing Classes, Event Results)

Late in 2000 Brown was Awarded an International Olympic Committee Certificate of Merit for his efforts.

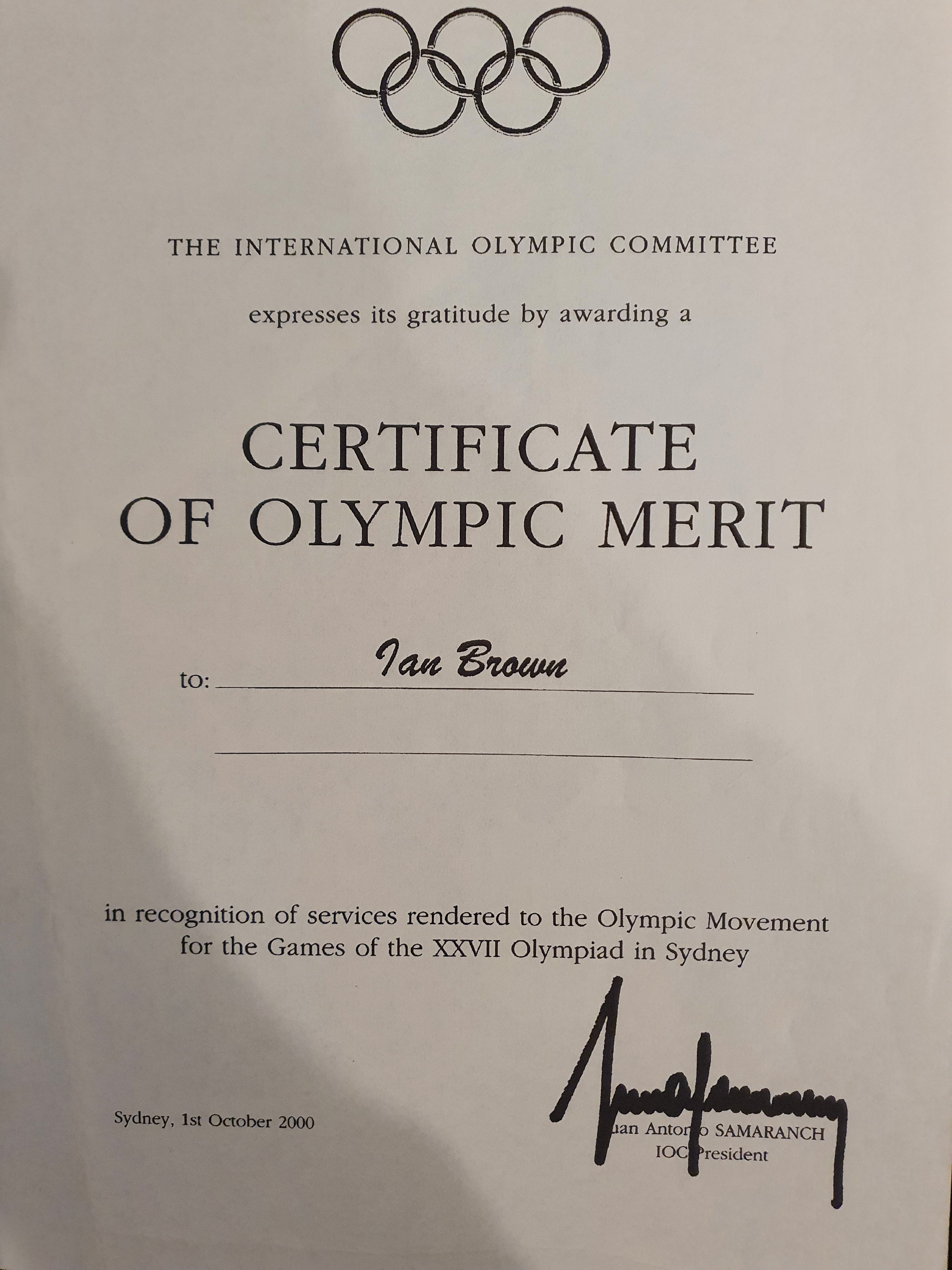

=== More Successful Achievements ===
During the 1980s, Ian Brown spent a sailing season racing the 16 ft Skiff Buckle Toyota. He achieved a podium placement in the NSW championships at Yarra Bay.

In 1993, he and his crew, John Dorling and Barry Watson managed to achieve the 2nd spot in the 1993 Etchells Class World Championship, Brisbane, Australia.

His most recent National Title wins are in the Farr 40 as tactician 2005, stepping in to skipper four heats with Martin Burke for Ian McCrossin and his team. They won the Dragon Class NSW championship on Sydney Harbour and two National titles in the SB20 class.

Later, Ian bought and crewed the SB20, giving the skipper role to Nathan Outteridge. They won the 2011 Nationals.

Interestingly Ian and Nathan put in a rushed SB20 charter boat effort with Tom Slingsby, who boasted his first attempt at being a forward hand during the 2011 SB20 World Championships at Torquay UK.

In 2013, Ian went back to being the skipper in an attempt to with the 2013 Nationals.

"The pre-regatta favourite, Brown and his crew of twin brothers Patrick Conway (bow & tactics) and Alex (mainsheet & tactics) and Scott Cotton (fourth hand) sailed a classy series with few errors. Their final scorecard of 19 points, a whopping 32.5 points from the nearest threat, proved an unclimbable mountain."

In recent times Brown mentors Youths for senior Olympic programs.
