= Georg Winter =

Georg Winter may refer to:

- Georg Winter (manager) (1941–2026), German businessman and environmentalist
- Georg Winter (historian) (1856–1912), German historian and archivist
- Heinrich Georg Winter (1848–1887), German mycologist
