= Walter Friedensburg =

German historian and archivist

Karl Walter Friedensburg (6 March 1855 in Hamburg – 19 February 1938 in Wernigerode) was a German historian and archivist.

He studied history at the Universities of Göttingen and Breslau, obtaining his habilitation at the University of Marburg in 1878. In 1880, he served as an archivist in Marburg, later working as a university lecturer in Marburg and Göttingen. From 1888 to 1901, he was associated with the Deutsches Historisches Institut Rom (German Historical Institute in Rome).

In 1901, he was appointed director of the Staatsarchiv Stettin (National Archives in Stettin), and in 1913 succeeded Georg Winter (1856–1912) as director of the State Archives of Magdeburg. Here, he became the co-author of Geschichte des Staatsarchiv Magdeburg (History of the State Archives of Magdeburg). He entered into retirement in 1923, relocating to Wernigerode during the following year.

From 1913, he was a member of the Historischen Kommission für die Provinz Sachsen und für Anhalt (Historical Commission for the Province of Saxony and for Anhalt), serving as its chairman in 1922–23.

== Written works ==
Friedensburg's prime area of research involved the history of the Reformation. The following are a few of his better known publications:

- Der Reichstag zu Speier 1526, im Zusammenhang der politischen und kirchlichen Entwicklung Deutschlands im Reformationzeitalte, 1887 - The Diet of Speyer in 1526, in the context of political and religious development in Germany.
- Die chronik des Cerbonio Besozzi, 1548-1563, 1904 (edition) - Chronicles of Cerbonio Besozzi.
- Geschichte der Universität Wittenberg, 1917 - History of the University of Wittenberg.
- Die Protokolle der Kirchenvisitationen im Stift Merseburg von 1562 und 1578, 1931
- Kaiser Karl v. und papst Paul III. (1534-1549), 1932 - Emperor Charles V and Pope Paul III.
- Johannes Sleidanus, der geschichtsschreiber und die schicksalsmächte der reformationszeit, 1935 - book on historian Johannes Sleidanus (1506-1556).
