= Javelin dinghy (Australasia) =

Dinghy sailed in Australia and New Zealand

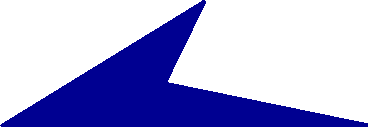
- Class symbol

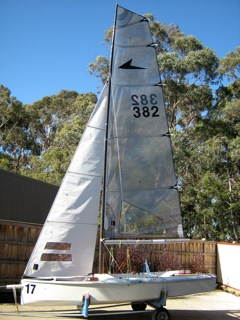

Boat
- Crew: 2
- Trapeze: single

Hull
- Hull weight: 150 lbs (70 kg)
- LOA: 14 ft (4.3 m)
- Beam: 5 ft (1.5 m)

Sails
- Mainsail area: 125 ft^{2} (11.6 m^{2})
- Jib/genoa area: 50 ft^{2} (4.3 m^{2})
- Spinnaker area: 200ft^{2} (18.6 m^{2})

Racing
- D-PN: 97.5

The Javelin is a high-performance skiff type dinghy sailed in Australia and New Zealand. The class was founded by designer John Spencer in 1961. Spencer also founded the Cherub Class. It is 14 feet long, sporting a large sail area, single trapeze and asymmetrical spinnaker. The Javelin is a development class, meaning that boats vary in shape within a framework of rules, rather than being all built to the same design. Bruce Farr is another well-known designer who drew successful Javelins.

Its 70 kg (150 lb) hull, and efficient sail plan allow it to exceed speeds of 25 knots and provide fleet racing.

== Competitions and racing ==
Both Australia and New Zealand run their respective National championships each year, with New Zealand holding a National contest ever since 1964. The two countries race each other every second year in the Javelin Class South Pacific Championships, sailing for the "Air New Zealand Trophy". This contest was first sailed during the season of 1968–69, and was won by the New Zealand Javelin Rangi. The South Pacific Championships is the most sought after of the titles.

=== Sanders Memorial Cup (NZ) ===
The Sanders Memorial Cup is the oldest sailing trophy sailed for in New Zealand. The Sanders Cup holds a special place in New Zealand Yachting History; it is the oldest trophy sailed for in New Zealand under its original inception and it is the only remaining senior interprovincial challenge competition still sailed for today. Since the inaugural races in 1921, it has been sailed for every year with the exception of 1942–45. The Sanders Memorial Cup was presented by Messrs Walker and Hall Limited in 1921 in the memory of Lieutenant Commander W. E. Sanders, V.C., D.S.O., R.N.R. for interprovincial competition between 14 ft (4.3 m) one-design yachts.

The Javelin class sail each year for the Sanders Cup, with only one entry from each region in New Zealand allowed. A sail-off takes place to determine who will represent each region.
