= Aleksandr Potapov =

Aleksandr Potapov may refer to:

- Aleksandr Potapov (statesman)
- Aleksandr Potapov (sailor)
- Alexander Potapov (chess player)
