= José Cobos =

José Cobos may refer to:

- José Cobos (footballer) (born 1968), French footballer
- José Cobos (baseball) (born 1980), Mexican baseball pitcher
- José Cobos Benítez (born 1963), Spanish wheelchair basketball player
