= Pacific High (film) =

1979 sailing documentary produced by Roy E. Disney

- Directed by: Michael Ahnemann
- Produced by: Roy E. Disney
- Cinematography: Stephen Burum
- Edited by: Michael Ahnemann
- Music by: Robert F. Brunner
- Production company: Roy E. Disney Productions
- Release date: 1979
- Running time: 83 minutes
- Country: United States
- Language: English

Pacific High is a 1979 documentary film chronicling the 1978 Newport to Ensenada International Yacht Race. The film was produced by Roy E. Disney and directed by Michael Ahnemann.

== Production ==
Roy E. Disney had a decades-long passion for sailing, competed in sailing competitions, and owned several sailing yachts. Disney had a film crew follow his participation in the 1978 Newport to Ensenada International Yacht Race aboard his racing yacht Shamrock for the documentary.

Disney produced this film independently from Walt Disney Productions (now known as The Walt Disney Company). He had resigned as an executive of the company the year before.

A song was written for the film called "Sometimes," with music by Robert F. Brunner and lyrics by Roy E. Disney. The song was sung in the film by Christalee McPherson.

In its initial release, Pacific High was rated R for language. Roy E. Disney commented that the film was the first R-rated Disney movie.

== See also ==
Disney produced two other sailing documentaries: Transpac: A Century Across the Pacific (2001) and Morning Light (2008). The latter was distributed by Walt Disney Pictures.
