= Ragtime (yacht) =

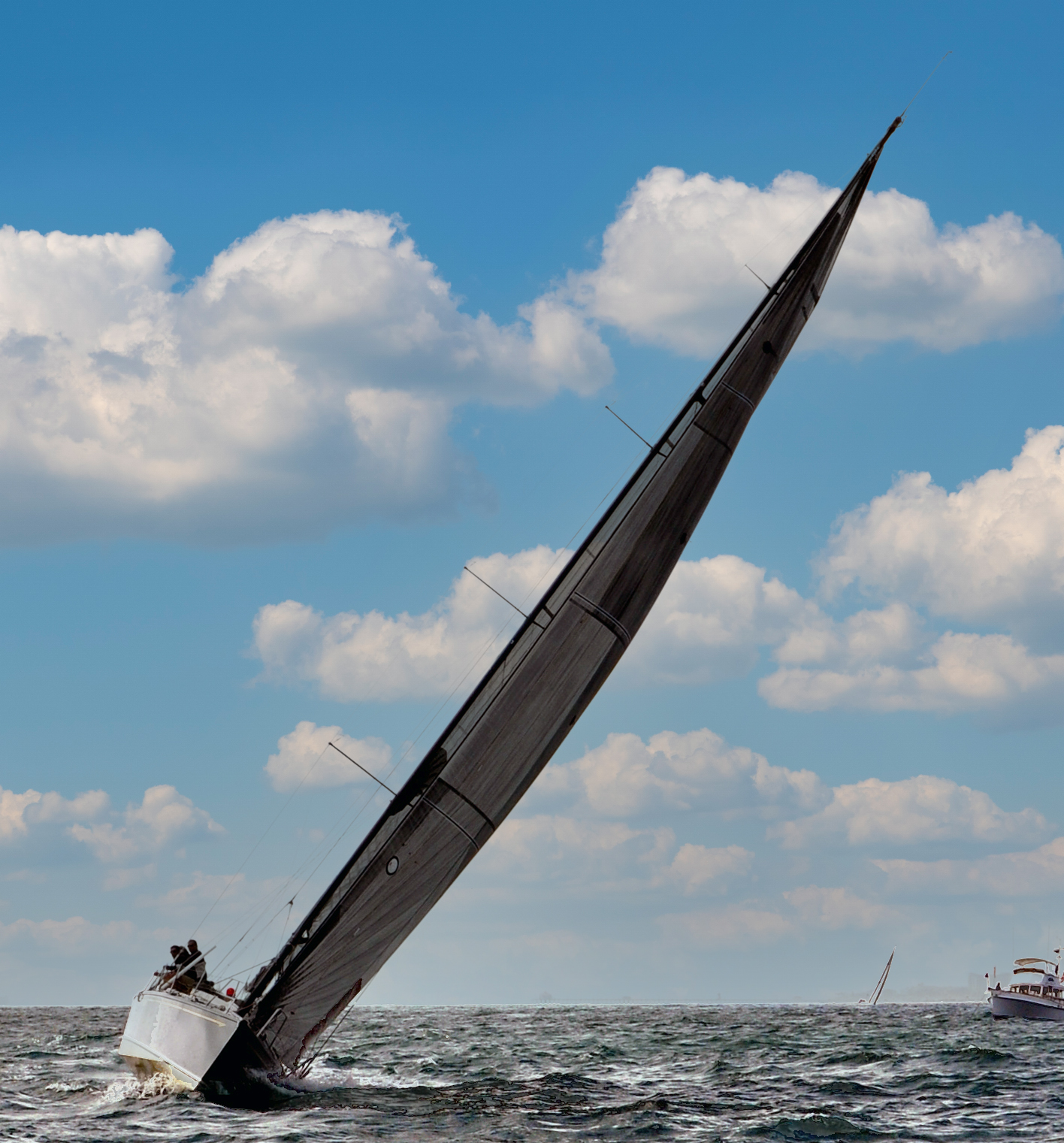
- Racing Yacht Ragtime, 2013
- Sail no: USA 7960
- Designer(s): John Spencer
- Launched: 1963
- Owner(s): Tina Roberts

Racing career
- Notable victories: 1967 Keelboat Fleet Championship

Specifications
- Type: Sloop
- Length: 65 ft (20 m) (LOA); 11 ft 9 in (3.58 m) (LWL)
- Mast height: 26 m (85 ft)

Ragtime (formerly known as Infidel) is a racing yacht designed by New Zealand naval architect John Spencer and built in 1963. The yacht is notable for her ultralight monohull design, which was unconventional at the time of her construction. Originally owned by Tom Clark, she was renamed Ragtime by a subsequent owner when she was sold to new owners in the United States and became widely recognized for her competitive performance in ocean racing.

== Racing history ==
Ragtime's first major victory came in 1967 during the Keelboat Fleet Championship in New Zealand, where she defeated the well-known yacht Ranger. She became renowned during the 1973 Transpacific Yacht Race (Transpac) from Los Angeles to Honolulu, where she narrowly defeated the favored Windward Passage by four minutes and 31 seconds. In the 1975 Transpac, Ragtime finished first among a fleet of 65 boats with an elapsed time of 9 days, 23 hours, and 54 minutes, completing the race over eight hours ahead of the second-place finisher, Ondine. Although her time fell short of the 1971 record set by Windward Passage, Ragtime was notable for being the first monohull to achieve this distinction during the race. She placed seventh in Class A and 52nd overall, influenced by her high Transpac rating. Her participation in the Los Angeles to Tahiti Yacht Race in 1977 set a record time of 14 days, 16 hours, 24 minutes, and 23 seconds. She also competed successfully in the 2008 Sydney to Hobart Yacht Race—a race she was refused entry back in 1967.

In the 1980s, Home Depot co-founder Pat Farrah retrofitted the yacht, ensuring she could continue participating in competitive events like the Transpac. The modifications preserved her SLED design integrity while enhancing its performance.

In 2003, Chris Welsh, Jon Richards, Alan Peterson, and Scott Zimmer won Ragtime at a Los Angeles County auction. After Chris Welsh became the sole owner, Ragtime competed in various other prestigious races, including the Newport to Ensenada International Yacht Race, where she finished 10th in 2006.

== Modifications ==
Ragtime underwent several modifications over the years. In the 1980s, she was retrofitted by Pat Farrah. More recently, under the ownership of Tina Roberts, the yacht has been upgraded with modern materials and technologies while retaining its original SLED design from the original plywood hull to the iconic Ragtime girl, ensuring her ultralight design features remain intact.
