= Peter Dix =

Irish sailor (1953–1988)

Peter Thomas Stanley Dix (6 May 1953 – 21 December 1988) was an Irish Olympic sailor who competed in the 470 in 1976.

Dix was born in Dublin and was an alumnus of St Columba's College, Dublin and Trinity College Dublin. His cousin was Olympic sailor Robert Dix, with whom he competed.

A member of the 5th Royal Inniskilling Dragoon Guards, he was killed en route to New York City to work as a management consultant when a bomb exploded in the cargo hold of Pan Am Flight 103 over Lockerbie, Scotland in 1988. Abdelbaset al-Megrahi was convicted in 2001 of 270 counts of murder in connection with the bombing and was sentenced to life imprisonment.
