= Firebug =

A firebug is an arsonist or pyromaniac.

Firebug may also refer to:

== Science and technology ==
- Pyrrhocoris apterus, commonly referred as the firebug, an insect of the family Pyrrhocoridae
- Firebug (software), a web development tool

== Entertainment ==
- Firebug (comics), the name of three DC Comics supervillains
- Firebug (video game), a 1982 computer game for the Apple II computer
- Firebugs (video game), a 2002 game for the PlayStation
- The Fire Raisers (play), 1953 German play by Max Frisch also known in English as The Firebugs

== Other uses ==
- "The Firebug", nickname of Bill Newton (1919–1943), Australian bomber pilot and posthumous recipient of the Victoria Cross
- Firebug (dinghy), a class of sailing dinghy
