= Sponza =

Sponza may refer to:

- Roberto Sponza (born 1951), Italian yacht racer
- Sponza Palace, in Croatia

- Sponza test scene, a 3D environment of the Sponza Palace atrium, commonly used for testing computer graphics rendering techniques

== See also ==
- Francesco Usper (also Sponza; 1561–1641), Italian composer and organist
