= Francisco Mourão =

Portuguese sailor

Personal information
- Nationality: Portuguese
- Born: 27 July 1954 (age 70)

Sport
- Sport: Sailing

Francisco Mourão (born 27 July 1954) is a Portuguese sailor. He competed in the 470 event at the 1976 Summer Olympics.
