= Jorge Springmühl =

Guatemalan sailor

Personal information
- Full name: Jorge Eduardo Springmühl Samayoa
- Nationality: Guatemalan
- Born: 6 October 1957 (age 67); Guatemala

Sport
- Sport: Sailing

Jorge Springmühl (born 6 October 1957) is a Guatemalan sailor. He competed in the 470 event at the 1976 Summer Olympics.
