= Damrong Sirisakorn =

Thai sailor (born 1950)

Personal information
- Nationality: Thai
- Born: 27 October 1950 (age 74)

Sport
- Sport: Sailing

Damrong Sirisakorn (Thai: ดำรงค์ ศิริสาคร; born 27 October 1950) is a Thai sailor. He started sailing when he joined the Navy around age 21, and first competed at the 1975 SEAP Games, where he won a gold medal. He competed in the 470 event at the 1976 Summer Olympics. He won gold at the 1978 Asian Games and the 1985 SEA Games. He holds the naval rank of lieutenant commander.
