= Mitsushi Kuroda =

Japanese sailor

Personal information
- Nationality: Japanese
- Born: 13 October 1952 (age 72)

Sport
- Sport: Sailing

Mitsushi Kuroda (born 13 October 1952) is a Japanese sailor. He competed in the 470 event at the 1976 Summer Olympics.
