= ICSA Coed Dinghy National Championship =

ICSA Coed Dinghy National Championship or ICSA Open Fleet Race Nationalsis is the oldest and most prestigious of the American Inter-Collegiate Sailing Association National Championships.

Winners are awarded the Henry A. Morss Memorial Trophy. Second place team receives the Oxford University Yacht Club Trophy and third place team receives the Metropolitan Sailing League Trophy.

The first ten editions, from 1937 until 1946, were held at the Massachusetts Institute of Technology (MIT Sailing Pavilion) with Tech Dinghies, and since 1947 the sites of the championship have been rotated amongst the seven member conferences.

The championship are sailed in two person dinghies not less than 11 feet, nor more than 15 feet in length overall, and the regatta format consists of fleet racing. Since 2007, thirty six teams qualified from the seven conference championships are divided into two fleets (East & West) for the Semifinals, and the top nine teams from each fleet advance to the ICSA Dinghy National Championship.

== Champions ==
Year	Champion	Team members
1937	Massachusetts Institute of Technology	Runyon Colie Jr., C. Eric Olson Jr., Herman H. Hanson Jr.
1938	Massachusetts Institute of Technology	Runyon Colie Jr., Herman H. Hanson Jr., C. Eric Olson Jr.
1939	Massachusetts Institute of Technology	Runyon Colie Jr., Herman H. Hanson Jr.
1940	Princeton University	F. Gardner Cox Jr., S. Trevor Pardee
1941	Princeton University	S. Trevor Pardee, F. Gardner Cox Jr.
1942	Brown University	Robert Barningham, Leonard A. Romagna
1943	Massachusetts Institute of Technology	Samuel D. Parkinson, Harold Boericke
1944	United States Coast Guard Academy	C. Mitchell Daniel, Arthur A. Fontaine
1945	Massachusetts Institute of Technology	Charles K. Bloomer, Leigh A. Brite
1946	Massachusetts Institute of Technology	Charles M. Hunt Jr., John Marvin, Raymond M. Brown
1947	Yale University	Robert E. Monetti, Robert Coulson
1948	Brown University	Charles L. Ill, Frederick H. Wilson Jr.
1949	Yale University	Robert E. Monetti, Robert Coulson
1950	Yale University	Robert E. Monetti, Robert Coulson
1951	Massachusetts Institute of Technology	Howard H. Fawcett Jr., Robert N. Nickerson
1952	Harvard University	Charles S. Hoppin, James E. Nathanson
1953	Harvard University	Charles S. Hoppin, James E. Nathanson, Timothy M. Brown, David Cabot
1954	Massachusetts Institute of Technology	Horacio A. Garcia, Alain J. deBerc
1955	Massachusetts Institute of Technology	Alain J. deBerc, Fred A. Brooks Jr.
1956	United States Naval Academy	David C. Minton III, James P. Googe Jr.
1957	United States Naval Academy	James P. Googe Jr., Calvin H. Reed, Richard L. Tillman
1958	Massachusetts Institute of Technology	C. Dennis Posey, William S. Widnall
1959	Harvard University	Hanson C. Robbins, William G. Saltonstall Jr.
1960	United States Coast Guard Academy	William C. Park III, John H. Wuestneck
1961	Massachusetts Institute of Technology	Peter R. Gray, Donald E. Nelson
1962	United States Coast Guard Academy	John A. Wuestneck, Frederick D. Smith, Steven C. Martin, Lewis W. Parker
1963	Princeton University	William S. Cox, Marshall Long, Edward A. Greenberg, Gary A. Cameron, Robert H. Purrington
1964	University of British Columbia	Colin N. Park, Douglas Helmer, Patricia J. Maitland, Richard L. Helmer, Alexander L. Foley
1965	University of Rhode Island	Art Paine, Dominic Quadrini, Peter Greene, Dana Neville
1966	United States Coast Guard Academy	Frederick V. Minson, Victor E. Hipkiss, James T. Ingham, Stephen R. Welch
1967	University of Southern California	Scott H. Allan, Scottie Bevan, William J. Symes, Ann Barneson, Henry Sprague III, Dannis V. Parker
1968	San Diego State University	Thomas W. McLaughlin, Suzanne M. Peterson, Edward O. Butler, Alexander S. Caldwell, Dennis Allison
1969	San Diego State University	Edward O. Butler, Alexander S. Caldwell, Warren Smit, Thomas W. McLaughlin, Paul Hunrichs
1970	University of Southern California	Argyle Campbell, Susan Barneson, Timothy P. Hogan, Cynthia C. Cotton
1971	University of Southern California	Argyle Campbell, Gary J. Hasson, Jack J. Jakosky, Douglas P. Rastello
1972	University of California, Irvine	Dave Hodges, Ed Sands, Woody Macias, Jeff McDermaid, Jay Glaser
1973	Tulane University	Agustin G. Diaz, Dan Nash, Lee Shuman, Douglas Bull, Toby Darden
1974	Harvard University	Taylor E. Neff, Clement B. Wood, Christopher S. Middendorf, Stephen L. Saudek
1975	Yale University	Steve Benjamin, Peter Isler, David Perry, Ginny Hopkins, Susan Daly, Peter Bowe
1976	Tufts University	Sam Altreuter, Cindy Palladino, Neal Fowler, Laurie Gabriel, Dave Kellogg, Dave Leopold, Hale Walcoff, Chris Fowler, Jeff Schwartz
1977	University of Rhode Island	Ken Legler, Kathy Contildes, Ed Adams, Marc Siegel
1978	University of California, Los Angeles	Mark Rastello, Alan Jewett, Heidi Berg, Bob Martin, Jennifer Martyn, Marty Vogel
1979	United States Merchant Marine Academy	Alexander Smigelski, John Duclos, Thomas Lihan, Bernard Rodal, John Eckart, Tito Giron, Gary Stewart
1980	Tufts University	Stu Johnstone, Cathy Duffy, Joe Petrucci, Rosanne Altshuler
1981	Tufts University	Paul Dickey, Susan Cripe, Chris Hufstader, Nevin Sayre, Riva Levinson, Pam Fields, Bill Lynn, Michael Zavell, Wendy Witten
1982	Boston University	John Shadden, Jeff Tomassetti, Ken Read, Lizanne Capper
1983	United States Merchant Marine Academy	Morgan Reeser, Allen Lindsey, Dan Grieschen, Jay Renehan, Carrie Rispoli, Tim Park
1984	United States Merchant Marine Academy	Morgan Reeser, Bill Peterson, Peter Lindsey, Allen Lindsey, Michelle Moreland, Jay Renehan, Tracy Denis
1985	Boston University	Brad Read, Terryl King, Paul Brierre, Pete Melvin, Mary Jodice, Bill Foster
1986	College of Charleston	Michael J. Pinckney, Rob Everton, Christopher B. Larson, Jayne Simmons, Christopher P. Moe, John C. Lovell, Carl A. Hilton, Penny Misoyianis
1987	United States Merchant Marine Academy	Peter Renehan, Allen Kruger, Scott Leming, Michelle Moreland, Doug Helmer
1988	University of California, Irvine	Jon Pinckney, Nick Scandone, James Malm, Mike Sturman, Jackie Landsman, Scott Munch
1989	Old Dominion University	Terry Hutchinson, Jim Weber, Christine Bateman, Mitch Brindley, Cari Maidlow, Mike Devlin
1990	University of California, Irvine	Jaime Malm, Mike Sturman, Nick Adamson, Scott Munch, Patrick Rowley, Geoff Becker, Ross Nemerof
1991	United States Naval Academy	Shane Baldino, Jeri Lea Smalley, Susie Minton, Brad Rodi
1992	Dartmouth College	Chris McDowell, Brandon Prior, John Fallon, Suzanne Sellers
1993	United States Naval Academy	Mike O'Bryan, Brad Rodi, Akane Saunders, David Fagen, Melissa Jackson, Heather Keane
1994	United States Naval Academy	David Fagen, Melissa Jackson, Heather Keane, Ryan Cox, Sean Fujimoto, Blanca Funes, Nick Cromwell
1995	United States Naval Academy	Ryan Cox, Erica Museler, Blanca Funes, R.D. Burley, Jessica Danluck, Sean Fujimoto, Julie Younger
1996	United States Merchant Marine Academy	Bill Hardesty, Marci Girard, David Julian, Anna Strang
1997	Tufts University	Graeme Woodworth, Kiri Wilson, Tim Fallon, Martha Carleton
1998	Old Dominion University	John Torgerson, Jenifer Patt, Lora Sanders, Mark Zagol, Heather Pescatello, Justin Castagne
1999	Boston University	Stan Schreyer, Rich Bell, Brian Stanford, Christine Retlev
2000	St. Mary's College of Maryland	Anthony Kotoun, Rob Kotler, Ali Sharp, Ty Reed, Molly Curtiss, Danny Pletsch
2001	Tufts University	Pete Levesque, Caroline Hall, Laurin Manning, Adam Deermount, Lisa Keith
2002	St. Mary's College of Maryland	Danny Pletsch, Jen Vandemoer, Dave Perkowski, Brent Jansen, Galen Largay
2003	Harvard University	Clay Bischoff, Lema Kikuchi, David Darst, Cardwell Potts IV, M. Yu, G. Dorfman, D. Rodin
2004	University of Hawaii at Manoa	Bryan Lake, Jennifer Warnock, Joey Pasquali, Matt Stine, C. Allen, Cassandra Harris, Jeff Boyd
2005	Hobart and William Smith Colleges	John Storck, Amanda Markee, Zach Goldman, Molly Lawson, Trevor Moore, Augusta Nadler
2006	College of Charleston	Jamie kimball, Britney Haas, Russ O'Reilly, Megan Riddle, Susan Lintern
2007	College of Charleston	Russell O'Reilly, Megan Riddle, Brendan Healy, Britney Haas, Julia Southworth
2008	Georgetown University	Chris Behm, Carly Chamberlain, Marco Teixidor, Charlie Buckingham, Alex Tayler
2009	St. Mary's College of Maryland	Jesse Kirkland, Madeline Jackson, Megan Magill, Mike Kuschner, Michael Menninger, Kelly Wilbur, Jennifer Chamberlin
2010	Boston College	Tyler Sinks, Lucy Wallace, Briana Provancha, Taylor Canfield, Sandra Williams
2011	Boston College	Tyler Sinks, Lucy Wallace, Taylor Canfield, Emily Migliaccio, Patrick Hession, Emily Massa, Daniel Bloomstine
2012	Georgetown University	Chris Barnard, Hilary Kenyon, Evan Aras, Katherine Canty
2013	College of Charleston	Juan Ignacio Maegli, Septima McAdams, Corinna DeCollibus, Ben Spector, Mac Mace, Alicia Blumenthal, Brooks Clark, Sarah Somes, Jeffrey Aschieris
2014	Yale University	Graham Landy, Eugenia Custo Greig, Katherine Gaumond, Ian Barrows, Amanda Salvesen, Marlena Fauer
2015	Yale University	Graham Landy, Charlotte Belling, Katherine Gaumond, Ian Barrows, Meredith Megarry, Clara Robertson
2016	Georgetown University	Nevin Snow, Meaghan MacRae, Sean Golden, Campbell D'Eliscu, Isabelle Ruiz De Luzuriaga
2017	College of Charleston	Stefano Peschiera, Grace McCarthy, Jack Cusick, Chloe Dapp
2018	Massachusetts Institute of Technology	Ty Ingram, Sameena Shaffeeullah, Greta Farrell, Trevor Long, Julia Cho, Greta Farrell, Marcus Abate
2019	College of Charleston	Augie Dale, Katherine Lounsbury, Alie Toppa, Annabel Carrington, Jack Brown, Payton Alexander
2021	United States Naval Academy	Joseph Hermus, Kimmie Leonard, Connor Bayless, Fiona Lobon
2022	Tulane University	Cameron Giblin, Asher Zittrer, Ciara Rodriguez-Horan, Kit Stoll, Lucy Spearman, Gillian Perrell, Andrea Riefkohl Gonzalez
2023	Stanford University	Michelle Lahrkamp, Ellie Harned, Vanessa Lahrkamp, Abigail Tindall
2024	Harvard University	Lachlain McGranahan, Marbella Marlo, Justin Callahan, Kennedy Leehealey
2025	Stanford University	Thomas Sitzmann, Ellie Harned, Vanessa Lahrkamp, Alice Schmid, Piper Blackband, Reade Decker, Kit Harned, Dylan Sih, Ashtyn Tierney, Thomas Whidden, Lucas Woodworth

== Championships by team ==
Number of National Championships for each institution:
School	Championships	Years
Massachusetts Institute of Technology	12	1937, 1938, 1939, 1943, 1945, 1946, 1951, 1954, 1955, 1958, 1961, 2018
United States Naval Academy	7	1956, 1957, 1991, 1993, 1994, 1995, 2021
College of Charleston	6	1986, 2006, 2007, 2013, 2017, 2019
Yale University	6	1947, 1949, 1950, 1975, 2014, 2015
Harvard University	6	1952, 1953, 1959, 1974, 2003, 2024
Tufts University	5	1976, 1980, 1981, 1997, 2001
United States Merchant Marine Academy	5	1979, 1983, 1984, 1987, 1996
United States Coast Guard Academy	4	1944, 1960, 1962, 1966
Georgetown University	3	2008, 2012, 2016
St. Mary's College of Maryland	3	2000, 2002, 2009
Boston University	3	1982, 1985, 1999
University of California, Irvine	3	1972, 1988, 1990
University of Southern California	3	1967, 1970, 1971
Princeton University	3	1940, 1941, 1963
Tulane University	2	1973, 2022
Boston College	2	2010, 2011
Old Dominion University	2	1989, 1998
University of Rhode Island	2	1965, 1977
San Diego State University	2	1968, 1969
Brown University	2	1942, 1948
Stanford University	2	2023, 2025
Hobart and William Smith Colleges	1	2005
University of Hawaii at Manoa	1	2004
Dartmouth College	1	1992
University of California, Los Angeles	1	1978
University of British Columbia	1	1964
