= Dimitrios Gerontaris =

Greek sailor

Personal information
- Nationality: Greek
- Born: 18 June 1952 (age 72)

Sport
- Sport: Sailing

Dimitrios Gerontaris (born 18 June 1952) is a Greek sailor. He competed in the 470 event at the 1976 Summer Olympics.
