= MIT Engineers sailing =

College sailing program

MIT Sailing Team
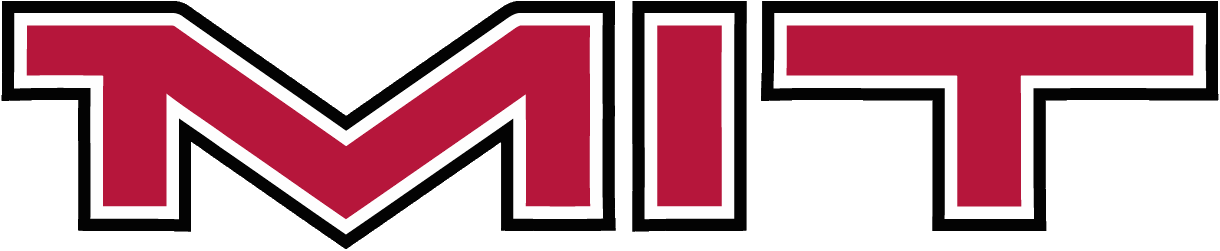
- Burgee
- University: Massachusetts Institute of Technology
- Conference: NEISA
- Location: Cambridge, Massachusetts
- Venue: Walter C. Wood Sailing Pavilion
- Area of Competition: Charles River
- Nickname: Engineers

The MIT sailing team is a varsity intercollegiate athletic team of the Massachusetts Institute of Technology in Cambridge, Massachusetts, United States. The team is a member of the New England Intercollegiate Sailing Association, which is part of the Inter-Collegiate Sailing Association.

== National championships ==
MIT has won 14 national championships:

- 12 Dinghy National Championships (1937, 1938, 1939, 1943, 1945, 1946, 1951, 1954, 1955, 1958, 1961 and 2018)
- 2 Women’s Dinghy National Championships (1971 and 1973)

== Sailors ==
Alan Sun in 2000 and JM Modisette in 2005 won the Robert H. Hobbs Sportsmanship Award.

Ralph Evans in 1948 (silver medal, firefly class); John Bertrand in 1976 (bronze medal, finn class); Horacio García in 1960; John Marvin in 1956; and Paula Lewin in 1992, 1996 and 2004, are olympic sailors from the MIT.

== Fleet ==
MIT developed their own dinghy in 1935, the Tech Dinghy, to be used by the team.

== Venue ==
The home venue of the team is the Walter C. Wood Sailing Pavilion, located on the Charles River. The building was completed in 1935.

MIT burgee

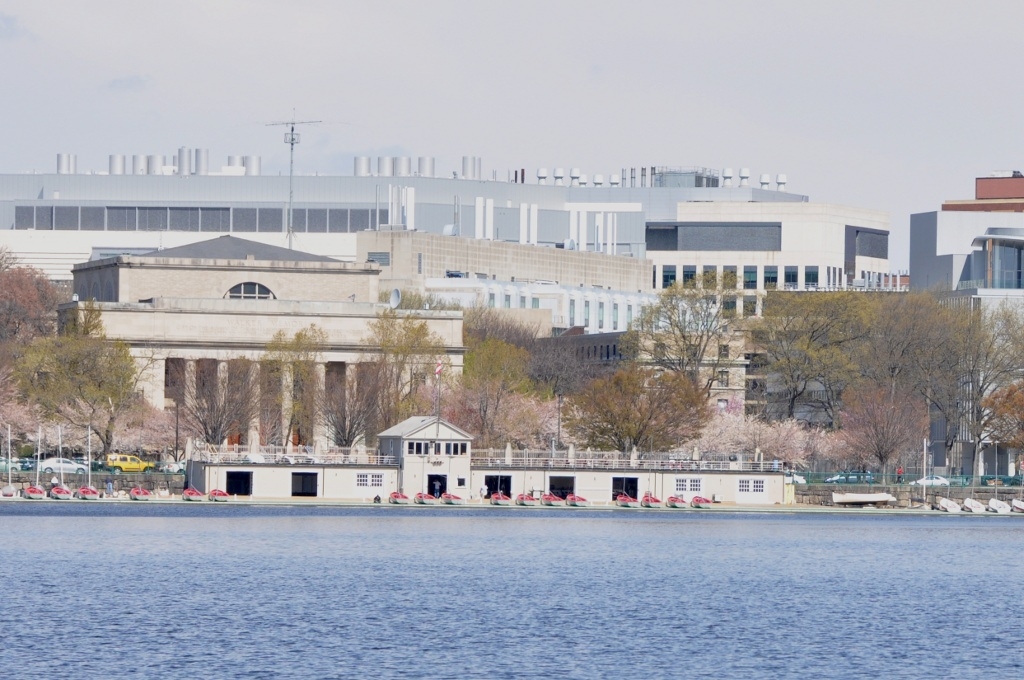
Walter C. Wood Sailing Pavilion

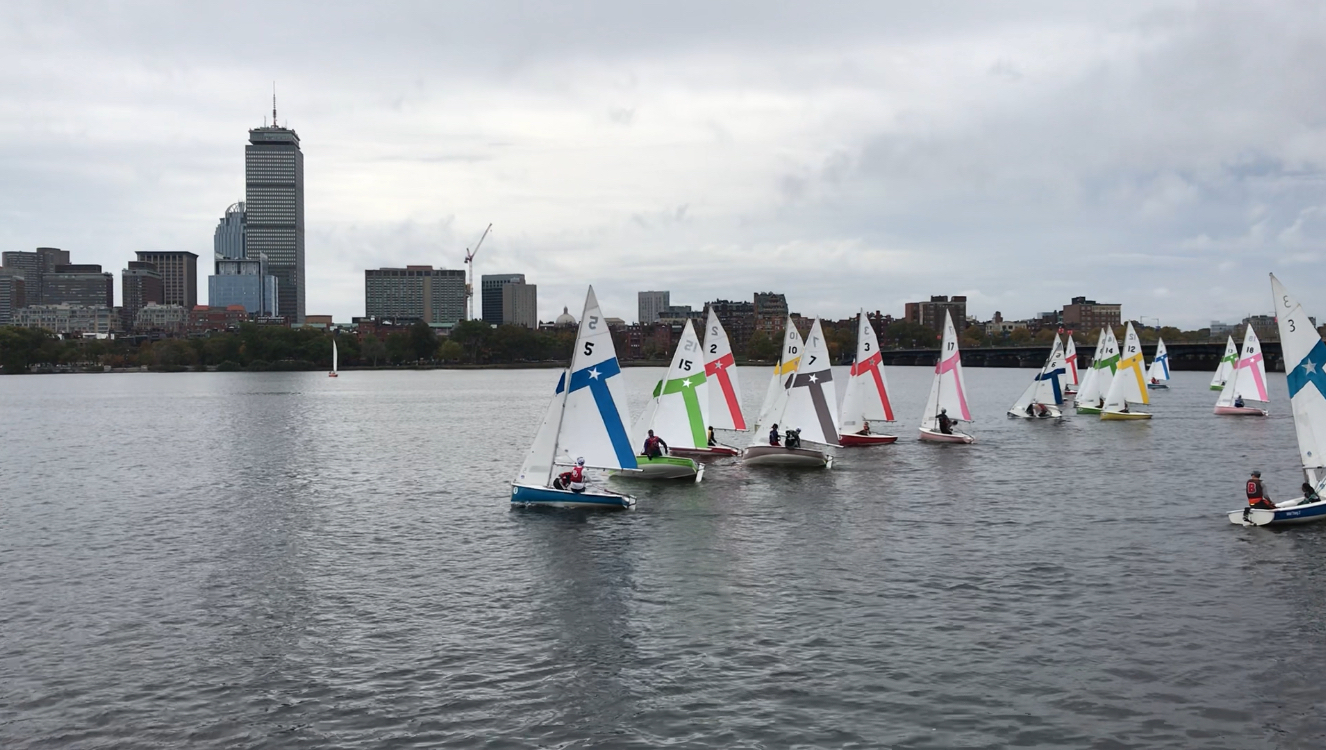
MIT dinghies on the Charles River
