= Robert and Tom Whitehurst =

Robert Whitehurst
Personal information
- Nationality: American
- Born: August 16, 1956 (age 69) Seattle, Washington, United States

Sport
- Sport: Sailing

Tom Whitehurst
Personal information
- Born: September 8, 1957 (age 68) Seattle, Washington, United States

Sport
- Sport: Sailing

Robert Whitehurst (born August 16, 1956) and Tom Whitehurst (born September 8, 1957) are American former sailors who competed in the 470 event at the 1976 Summer Olympics together. They won the Youth World title in 1975. Their boat was named “Captain Card.”
