= Scott Allan (sailor) =

American sailor

Personal information
- Full name: Scott Hazzard Allan
- Nationality: American
- Born: May 27, 1946 (age 80) Pasadena, California, U.S.

Sport
- Country: United States
- Sport: Sailing
- College team: University of Southern California

Scott Hazzard Allan (born May 27, 1946) is an American former sailor. He won the ICSA Coed Dinghy National Championship with the University of Southern California sailing team in 1967, and competed in the Flying Dutchman event at the 1972 Summer Olympics.

He also coached sailing at the United States Naval Academy.
