= Hans Petter Jensen =

Norwegian sailor

Personal information
- Nationality: Norwegian
- Born: 15 August 1956 (age 68); Oslo, Norway

Sport
- Sport: Sailing

Hans Petter Jensen (born 15 August 1956) is a Norwegian sailor. He competed in the 470 event at the 1976 Summer Olympics.
