= Jay Cross (sailor) =

Canadian sailor

Personal information
- Born: 15 February 1953 (age 73) Toronto, Ontario, Canada

Sport
- Sport: Sailing

Jay Cross (born 15 February 1953) is a Canadian sailor. He competed in the 470 event at the 1976 Summer Olympics.
