= Roberto Vencato =

Italian yacht racer (1952–2022)

Personal information
- Nationality: Italy
- Born: 21 July 1952
- Died: 12 October 2022 (aged 70)

Sailing career
- Sport: Sailing
- Club: Società Triestina della Vela

Roberto Vencato (21 July 1952 – 14 October 2022) was an Italian yacht racer who competed in the 1976 Summer Olympics in Montreal.

As a young sailor he won numerous races in the Cadet and Flying Junior classes. In the Snipe class, he placed second in the Europe and Africa Junior Championship and, in 1972, he was South European champion in Blanes (Spain), sailing with Giorgio Brezich.

In the 470 class he won the Asitalia Italian national ranking, he was 3 times Italian Junior champion and once second (1970, 1971, 1972 and 1973), twice Italian champion and once second (1972, 1973 and 1974). He was also second at the Italian Master championship in 2007.

Vencato won a gold medal at the 1975 Mediterranean Games and was 14th at the 1976 Summer Olympics in the 470 class, where he won one of the races, sailing with his crew Roberto Sponza.

Vencato won many other regattas, among which the famous Barcolana of Trieste where he won 2 times the overall ranking and 11 times the class ranking.

As a coach he followed the Italian national teams (Juniors, Seniors and Olympic -both men and women-) from 1988 to 1992, managing 4 Olympic campaigns. He led his athletes to win 12 World Championships and 5 European Championships, 3 gold medals at the Mediterranean Games and 11 other medals.

Vencato was renowned for having always made his own sails and was an established sail-maker in Trieste, Italy. He died on 14 October 2022, at the age of 70.
