= Miguel Casellas =

Puerto Rican sailor

Personal information
- Nationality: Puerto Rican
- Born: 24 October 1938
- Died: October 15, 2025 (aged 86)

Sport
- Sport: Sailing

Miguel Casellas (born 24 October 1938) was a Puerto Rican competitive sailor. He competed in the 470 event at the 1972 Summer Olympics in Munich and the 1976 Summer Olympics in Montreal.
