= Derek Clark (sailor) =

British sailor

Personal information
- Nationality: British
- Born: 12 June 1951 (age 74)

Sport
- Sport: Sailing

Derek Clark (born 12 June 1951) is a British sailor. He competed in the 470 event at the 1976 Summer Olympics.
