= Luiz Aydos =

Brazilian sailor

Personal information
- Born: 23 November 1954 (age 70); Porto Alegre, Brazil

Sport
- Sport: Sailing

Luiz Aydos (born 23 November 1954) is a Brazilian sailor. He competed in the 470 event at the 1976 Summer Olympics.
