= Robert van Werkhoven =

Dutch sailor (born 1954)

Personal information
- Full name: Robert Willem van Werkhoven
- Nationality: Dutch
- Born: 29 January 1954 (age 72) Bloemendaal
- Height: 1.76 m (5.8 ft)

Sailing career
- Sport: Sailing
- Class: 470
Medal record
Sailing
Representing Netherlands
World Championship
Bronze medal – third place	1973 Kiel	470
European Championship
Gold medal – first place	1972 Medemblik	470
Bronze medal – third place	1973 Saint-Cast	470
- Updated on 2013-12-22

Robert Willem van Werkhoven (born 29 January 1954 in Bloemendaal) is a sailor from the Netherlands, who represented his native country at the 1976 Summer Olympics in Kingston, Canada. With his brother Joop van Werkhoven as helmsman Van Werkhoven took the 13th place in the 470.

== Sources ==
- "Robert van Werkhoven Bio, Stats, and Results". Olympic Sports. Sports-Reference.com. Archived from the original on 2020-04-18.
- "Nederlandse delegatie" (in Dutch). Leeuwarder courant : hoofdblad van Friesland. 1976-07-12.
- "Olympische zeilselectie" (in Dutch). De Telegraaf. 1976-05-20.
- "Montréal 1976 Official Report, Volume I: Organization" (PDF). Ottawa: COJO. 1978. Archived from the original (PDF) on February 2, 2014.
- "Montréal 1976 Official Report, Volume II: Facilities" (PDF). Ottawa: COJO. 1978. Archived from the original (PDF) on February 2, 2014.
- "Montréal 1976 Official Report, Volume III: Results" (PDF). Ottawa: COJO. 1978. Archived from the original (PDF) on January 1, 2014.
- "Robert van Werkhoven". www.linkedin.com.
