= Brett Bennett =

New Zealand sailor

Personal information
- Nationality: New Zealand
- Born: 10 February 1947 (age 78); Gisborne, New Zealand

Sport
- Sport: Sailing

Brett Bennett (born 10 February 1947) is a New Zealand sailor. He competed in the 470 event at the 1976 Summer Olympics.
