= Beatriz de Lisocky =

Colombian sailor

Beatriz de Lisocki
Personal information
- Nationality: Colombian
- Born: 23 February 1949 (age 77)

Sport
- Sport: Sailing

Beatriz de Lisocki (born 23 February 1946) is a Colombian sailor. She competed in the 470 event at the 1976 Summer Olympics. She was the only woman competing in sailing among 270 men. Apart from competing in the Olympics, she also won multiple titles sailing snipe, lightning, 470. In 1975 she won a silver medal in an international lightning competition in Valle del Bravo, Mexico.
