= John Spencer (boat designer) =

New Zealand boat designer

John Alfred Spencer (6 July 1931 – 4 March 1996) was a New Zealand boat designer.

== Biography ==
Spencer was born in Melbourne and moved to Eketāhuna in 1933. He spent most of his life in New Zealand.

In the 1950s, Spencer established a boatbuilding workshop on Bute Road in Browns Bay, Auckland, where he pioneered construction techniques for lightweight flyer boats and yachts.

He was a well-known designer of sailing boats of all sizes, including the Cherub, Javelin (NZ), Firebug and Flying Ant classes of sailing dinghies. His designs used thin plywood, hard chines, a vertical stem and stern and light displacement. The minimum weight for a Cherub hull was 50 kilograms (110 lb) and a Firebug is 40 kilograms (88 lb).

Spencer's most famous design was arguably the 62-foot hard-chined Infidel, later known as Ragtime, which he designed and built for Tom Clark, a New Zealand industrialist. Ragtime was launched in late 1964 and went on to win the 1967 Auckland Class A Championship. Eventually sold to US owners, Ragtime won the 1973 and 1975 Honolulu Transpac Races, the 2008 Transpac Tahiti Race, and Division II of the 2008 Sydney to Hobart Yacht Race.
