= Laurent Quellet =

Swiss sailor

Personal information
- Nationality: Swiss
- Born: 26 February 1952 (age 73)

Sport
- Sport: Sailing

Laurent Quellet (born 26 February 1952) is a Swiss sailor. He competed in the 470 event at the 1976 Summer Olympics.
