= Joaquim Ramada =

Portuguese sailor

Personal information
- Nationality: Portuguese
- Born: 27 June 1950 (age 74)

Sport
- Sport: Sailing

Joaquim Ramada (born 27 June 1950) is a Portuguese sailor. He competed in the 470 event at the 1976 Summer Olympics.
