= Mikko Brummer =

Finnish sailor

Personal information
- Nationality: Finnish
- Born: 23 July 1954 (age 70); Helsinki, Finland

Sport
- Sport: Sailing

Mikko Brummer (born 23 July 1954) is a Finnish sailor. He competed in the 470 event at the 1976 Summer Olympics.
