= Colin Park =

Canadian sailor

Personal information
- Nationality: Canadian
- Born: 9 February 1944 Vancouver, British Columbia, Canada
- Died: 23 November 2007 (aged 63) St. Petersburg, Florida, United States

Sport
- Sport: Sailing
- College team: University of British Columbia

Colin Park (9 February 1944 – 23 November 2007) was a Canadian sailor. He won the ICSA Coed Dinghy National Championship with the University of British Columbia sailing team in 1964, and competed in the 470 event at the 1976 Summer Olympics.
