= Morten Jensen (sailor) =

Norwegian sailor

Personal information
- Nationality: Norwegian
- Born: 11 April 1951 (age 73); Oslo, Norway

Sport
- Sport: Sailing

Morten Jensen (born 11 April 1951) is a Norwegian sailor. He competed in the 470 event at the 1976 Summer Olympics.
