= Joop van Werkhoven =

Dutch sailor (born 1950)

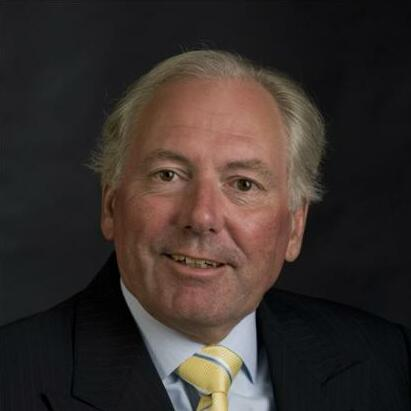

Personal information
- Full name: Johan Christiaan Dirk "Joop" van Werkhoven
- Nationality: Dutch
- Born: 20 May 1950 (age 76) Haarlem
- Height: 1.77 m (5.8 ft)

Sailing career
- Sport: Sailing
- Class: 470
Medal record
Sailing
Representing Netherlands
World Championship
| Bronze medal – third place | 1973 Kiel | 470 |
European Championship
| Gold medal – first place | 1972 Medemblik | 470 |
| Bronze medal – third place | 1973 Saint-Cast | 470 |
- Updated on 2013-12-22

Johan Christiaan Dirk "Joop" van Werkhoven (born 20 May 1950 in Haarlem) is a sailor from the Netherlands, who represented his native country at the 1976 Summer Olympics in Kingston, Ontario, Canada. With his brother Robert van Werkhoven as crew Van Werkhoven took the 13th place in the 470.

== Professional life ==
- Director KLM USA Passage
- Member of the board Volmac NV/Capgemini Benelux
- Managing Director Calmax bv
- CEO Brink's Nederland bv
- Member executive committee Brink's EMEA

== Sources ==
- "Joop van Werkhovens Bio, Stats, and Results". Olympic Sports. Sports-Reference.com. Archived from the original on 2020-04-18.
- "Nederlandse delegatie" (in Dutch). Leeuwarder courant : hoofdblad van Friesland. 1976-07-12.
- "Olympische zeilselectie". De Telegraaf (in Dutch). 1976-05-20.
- "Gouden dag zeilers". De Telegraaf (in Dutch). 1976-05-25.
- "Montréal 1976 Official Report, Volume I: Organization" (PDF). Ottawa: COJO. 1978. Archived from the original (PDF) on February 2, 2014.
- "Montréal 1976 Official Report, Volume II: Facilities" (PDF). Ottawa: COJO. 1978. Archived from the original (PDF) on February 2, 2014.
- "Montréal 1976 Official Report, Volume III: Results" (PDF). Ottawa: COJO. 1978. Archived from the original (PDF) on January 1, 2014.
- "Joop van Werkhoven". www.linkedin.com.
