= Rudi Biaudet =

Finnish sailor

Personal information
- Nationality: Finnish
- Born: 3 March 1953 (age 72); Turku, Finland

Sport
- Sport: Sailing

Rudi Biaudet (born 3 March 1953) is a Finnish sailor. He competed in the 470 event at the 1976 Summer Olympics.
