= Horacio García (sailor) =

Uruguayan sailor

Personal information
- Full name: Horacio Adolfo Francisco García Pastori
- Born: 4 October 1931 Montevideo, Uruguay
- Died: 24 August 2015 (aged 83)

Sport
- Sport: Sailing
- College team: Massachusetts Institute of Technology

Horacio García (4 October 1931 – 24 August 2015) was a Uruguayan sailor. He won the ICSA Coed Dinghy National Championship with the Massachusetts Institute of Technology sailing team in 1954, and competed in the Dragon event at the 1960 Summer Olympics.

He was a board member of the Snipe Class International Racing Association and Commodore in 1994. He also served during 17 years as commodore of the Yacht Club Punta del Este.
