= Larry Lindo =

Bermudian sailor

Personal information
- Nationality: Bermudian
- Born: 31 January 1943 (age 82)

Sport
- Sport: Sailing

Larry Lindo (born 31 January 1943) is a Bermudian sailor. He competed in the 470 event at the 1976 Summer Olympics.
