= Santi Thamasucharit =

Thai sailor (born 1951)

Personal information
- Nationality: Thai
- Born: 7 April 1951 (age 74)

Sport
- Sport: Sailing

Santi Thamasucharit (born 7 April 1951) is a Thai sailor. He competed in the 470 event at the 1976 Summer Olympics.
