= Peter Winters =

Belgian sailor

Personal information
- Nationality: Belgian
- Born: 21 July 1956 (age 68); Merksem, Belgium

Sport
- Sport: Sailing

Peter Winters (born 21 July 1956) is a Belgian sailor. He competed in the 470 event at the 1976 Summer Olympics.
