= Carl Winters =

Belgian sailor

Personal information
- Nationality: Belgian
- Born: 4 December 1953 (age 71); Merksem, Belgium

Sport
- Sport: Sailing

Carl Winters (born 4 December 1953) is a Belgian sailor. He competed in the 470 event at the 1976 Summer Olympics.
