= Flying Ant =

Type of boat

Development
- Designer: John Spencer
- Location: New Zealand
- Name: Flying Ant

Boat
- Crew: 2
- Trapeze: Single Trapeze

Hull
- Type: Monohull
- Construction: Wood/FiberGlass
- Hull weight: 40.9 kilograms (90 lb)
- LOA: 3.2 metres (10 ft 6 in)
- Beam: 1.295 metres (4 ft 3.0 in)

Sails
- Mainsail area: 4.9 square metres (53 sq ft)
- Jib/genoa area: 1.9 square metres (20 sq ft)
- Spinnaker area: 4.1 square metres (44 sq ft)

The Flying Ant is a class of sailing dinghy. The boat has a plywood design originally designed by John Spencer in New Zealand during the 1950s. It is normally sailed by two individuals under 17 years of age.
