= Antonio Gorostegui =

Spanish sailor

Personal information
- Full name: Antonio Gorostegui Ceballos
- Born: 1 April 1954 (age 72) Santander, Cantabria, Spain
- Height: 180 cm (5 ft 11 in)
- Weight: 70 kg (154 lb)

Sailing career
- Sport: Sailing
Medal record
Sailing
Representing Spain
Olympic Games
Silver medal – second place	1976 Montreal	470 class

Antonio Gorostegui Ceballos (Note: In this Spanish name, the first or paternal surname is Gorostegui and the second or maternal family name is Ceballos.) (born 1 April 1954) is a Spanish competitive sailor and Olympic silver medalist.

He won a silver medal in the 470 class at the 1976 Summer Olympics in Montreal, along with his partner Pedro Millet. He also won the 1982 and 1983 Star class World Championship together with Jose Doreste.

He was involved with Desafio España Copa Americ at the 1992 Louis Vuitton Cup.
