= Lars Johansson (sailor) =

Swedish sailor (born 1953)

Personal information
- Nationality: Swedish
- Born: 1 March 1953 (age 73) Kristinehamn, Sweden

Sport
- Sport: Sailing

Achievements and titles
- Olympic finals: 1976 Summer Olympics

Lars Johansson (born 1 March 1953) is a Swedish sailor. He competed in the 470 event at the 1976 Summer Olympics.
