= José Benítez (sailor) =

Puerto Rican sailor (born 1949)

Personal information
- Nationality: Puerto Rican
- Born: 9 July 1949 (age 75)

Sport
- Sport: Sailing

José Benítez (born 9 July 1949) is a Puerto Rican sailor. He competed in the 470 event at the 1976 Summer Olympics.
