= Olle Johansson (sailor) =

Swedish sailor

Personal information
- Full name: Hans Olle Johansson
- Born: 5 June 1957 (age 69) Kristinehamn, Värmland, Sweden
- Height: 1.79 m (5 ft 10 in)
- Weight: 64 kg (141 lb)

Sailing career
- Sport: Sailing
- Club: Kristinehamns SS

Hans Olle Johansson (born 5 June 1957) is a retired Swedish sailor. He competed in the mixed two person dinghy event at the 1976 Summer Olympics, together with his elder brother Lars, and finished in 20th place.
