= Lars Lønberg =

Danish sailor

Personal information
- Nationality: Danish
- Born: 14 April 1953 (age 71); Frederiksberg, Denmark

Sport
- Sport: Sailing

Lars Lønberg (born 14 April 1953) is a Danish sailor. He competed in the 470 event at the 1976 Summer Olympics.
