= José María Benítez =

Venezuelan physician and botanist

José María Benítez (1790–1855) was a Venezuelan medical doctor and botanist known for his efforts to prevent and combat cholera, and for recognition of the medicinal properties of Cinchona trees to treat malaria.

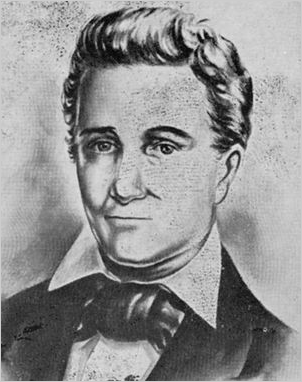
José María Benítez

== Biography ==
Between 1797 and 1802, he attended primary school at the parish school of La Victoria, his hometown. Benitez later moved to Caracas and entered the Royal and Pontifical University of Santa Rosa de Lima, where he graduated as a bachelor in the arts on February 17, 1808 and as a teacher in the arts on March 18, 1810. He began studying medicine by having as a tutor the protomedicalian José Joaquín Hernández, and in 1821 he graduated as a bachelor in medicine. Between 1821 and 1824 he performed internships with the doctor Pedro Bárcenas in the hospitals in Caracas of San Pablo Hermitaño.

In October 1824, the protomedic of Caracas granted him a degree in medicine. Benitez returned to La Victoria and practiced his profession between 1824 and 1855. From 1827 he was a member of the Medical Faculty of Caracas and a corresponding partner in La Victoria. In 1829 he joined the Economic Society of Friends of the Country. Benitez divulges the knowledge of the time about epidemics, especially of cholera, affirming its contagious character against the consensus of the time that rejected it. His knowledge of botany allowed him to recognize corner trees in the Costa Mountain Range to treat pallial fevers, especially yellow fever. His main work is about ethnobotany, the application of botany to cure diseases and in the area of industrial use of forest products, such as rubber.
