= Dan Ibsen Sørensen =

Danish sailor (born 1954)

Personal information
- Nationality: Danish
- Born: 5 October 1954 (age 72) Frederiksberg, Denmark

Sport
- Sport: Sailing

Dan Ibsen Sørensen (born 5 October 1954) is a Danish sailor. He competed in the 470 event at the 1976 Summer Olympics.
