= Firebug (dinghy) =

Class of sailing dinghy

The Firebug is a class of sailing dinghy that was designed by John Spencer and Peter Tait of Auckland, New Zealand in 1995. It is a 2.4 m (8 foot) long sailing dinghy designed to be built quickly and easily by builders with no previous experience of boatbuilding. A detailed report was published in Watercraft Magazine.

== Construction ==
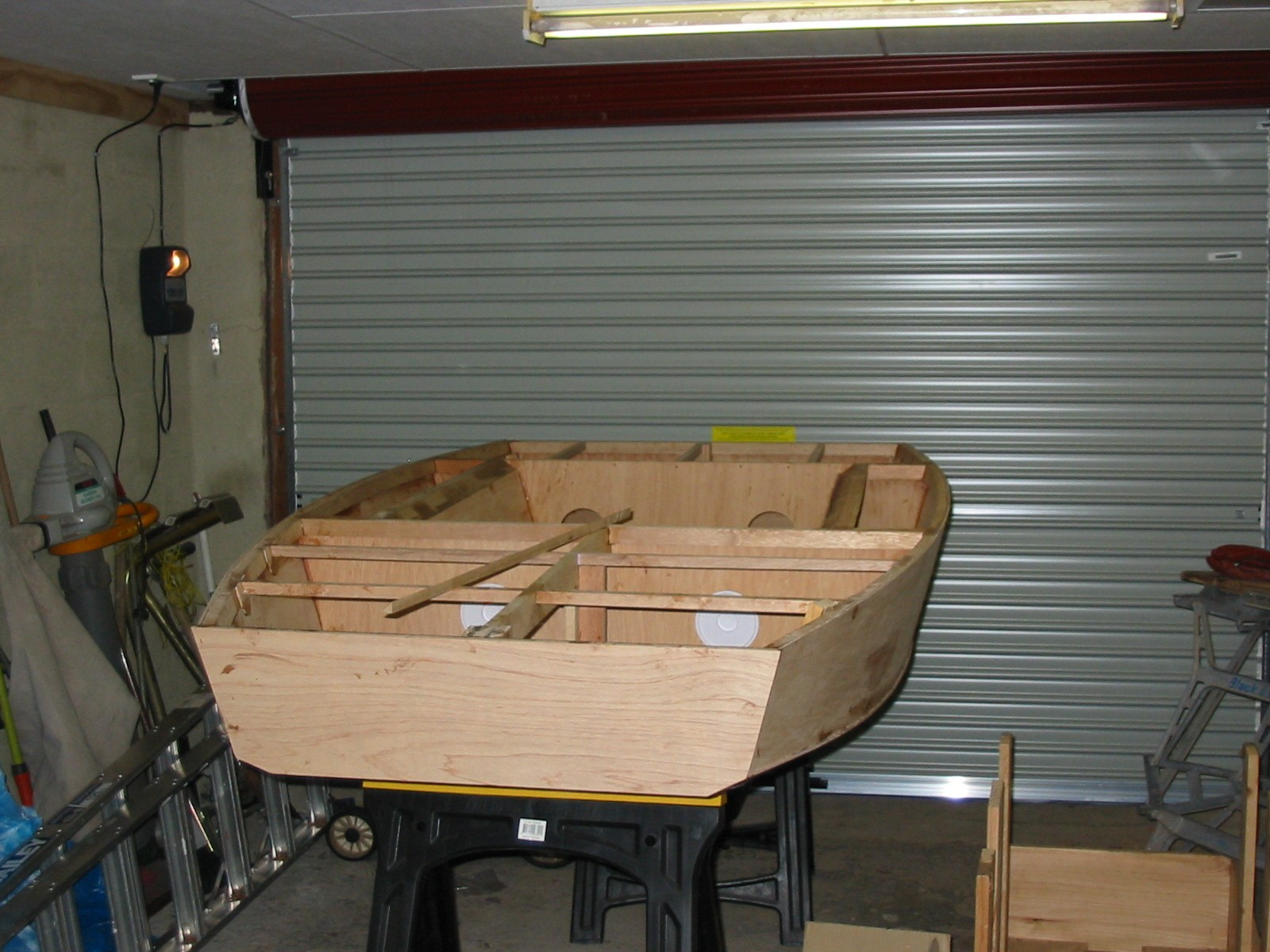
Firebug dinghy with sub deck structure finished

The Firebug is constructed on a rigid jig with 6 timber stringers and a centerline web. The flat bottom is 600 mm wide and is made from 9 mm marine plywood. The sides, bilge panels bulkheads and deck are cut from 2.5 panels of 4 mm marine plywood. The minimum weight of the completed hull is 40 kg (sometimes cited as 27 kg).

To highlight the straightforward construction, a Firebug was built live at the 2008 Sydney International Boat Show.

=== Rig ===
The deck stepped mast is supported by shrouds and a forestay and rotates on a pin at the step. To allow adults to sail Firebugs comfortably, the design brings the sheet down from the boom in front of the Centreboard box allowing greater space for the sailor.

== Sailing ==
Firebugs have 4.5 sq m sail area. This compares with 3.3 for the Optimist junior training dinghy. This 50% greater sail area means that Firebugs are raced by adults as well as graduates from Optimists and other classes. Unusually among modern dinghy designs, the rig is provided with reef points to allow lighter or less experienced sailors to continue to participate, when stronger winds are forecast. A key to the success of the Firebug is its capacity to recover from a capsize and continue racing. This is achieved by the placement of the buoyancy tanks so that water drains out of the cockpit as the boat is righted from a capsize.

Despite its small size, the Firebug will easily plane carrying an adult.

== Class organisation ==
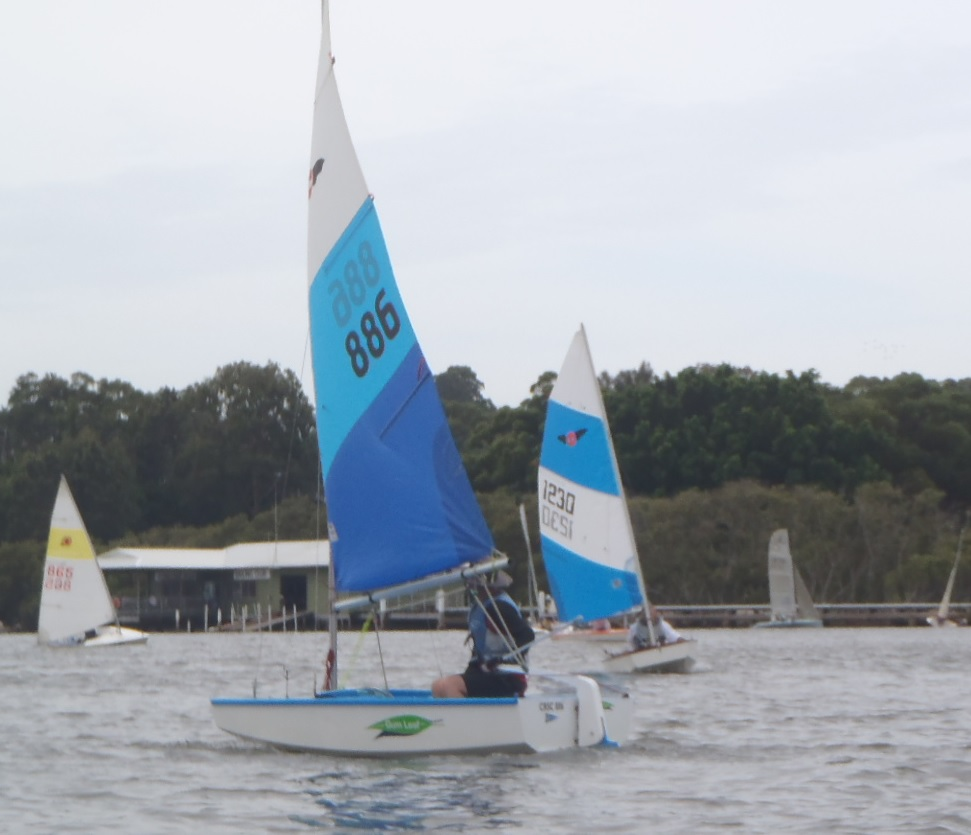
Firebug Dinghies sailing at Concord Ryde Sailing Club

The class is administered and support is provided to builders from the class's office in Russell, New Zealand. Sails, masts and rigging packages are dispatched to builders across the world.

== Reception ==
The first Firebug was built in 1988. Since then, active fleets have been established in Australia and New Zealand and over 1,000 boats have been built in places as diverse as Malta, Samoa and Georgia on the Black Sea.

In Australia, a community group arranged for a group of teenagers who were at risk of leaving school early to build a FireBug for their stand at the 2008 Sydney International Boat Show.

The New Zealand Ministry of Education funds schools to build FireBugs for the full cost of the boat, plus an extra 5% to allow for tools.
