= Pedro Millet =

Spanish sailor

Personal information
- Born: 27 May 1952 (age 74)

Sailing career
- Sport: Sailing
Medal record
Sailing
Representing Spain
Olympic Games
Silver medal – second place	1976 Montreal	470 class

Pedro Luis Millet Soler (born 27 May 1952) is a Spanish competitive sailor and Olympic silver medalist.

He won a silver medal in the 470 class at the 1976 Summer Olympics in Montreal, along with his partner Antonio Gorostegui.
