= Aleksandr Potapov (sailor) =

Soviet sailor

Personal information
- Full name: Aleksandr Yakovlevich Potapov
- Nationality: Soviet
- Born: 5 May 1944; Dolgoprudny, Russia
- Died: 18 September 2011 (aged 67); Dolgoprudny, Russia

Sport
- Sport: Sailing

Aleksandr Yakovlevich Potapov (Russian: Александр Яковлевич Потапов, 5 May 1944 – 18 September 2011) was a Soviet sailor. He competed in the 470 event at the 1976 Summer Olympics.
