= Ian Ruff =

Australian sailor

Personal information
- Born: 16 December 1946 (age 79)

Sailing career
- Sport: Sailing
Medal record
Sailing
Representing Australia
Olympic Games
| Bronze medal – third place | 1976 Montreal | 470 class |

Ian Ruff (born 16 December 1946) is an Australian competitive sailor and Olympic bronze medalist.

He won a bronze medal in the 470 class at the 1976 Summer Olympics in Montreal, along with his partner Ian Brown.
