= Newport to Ensenada International Yacht Race =

Annual yacht race

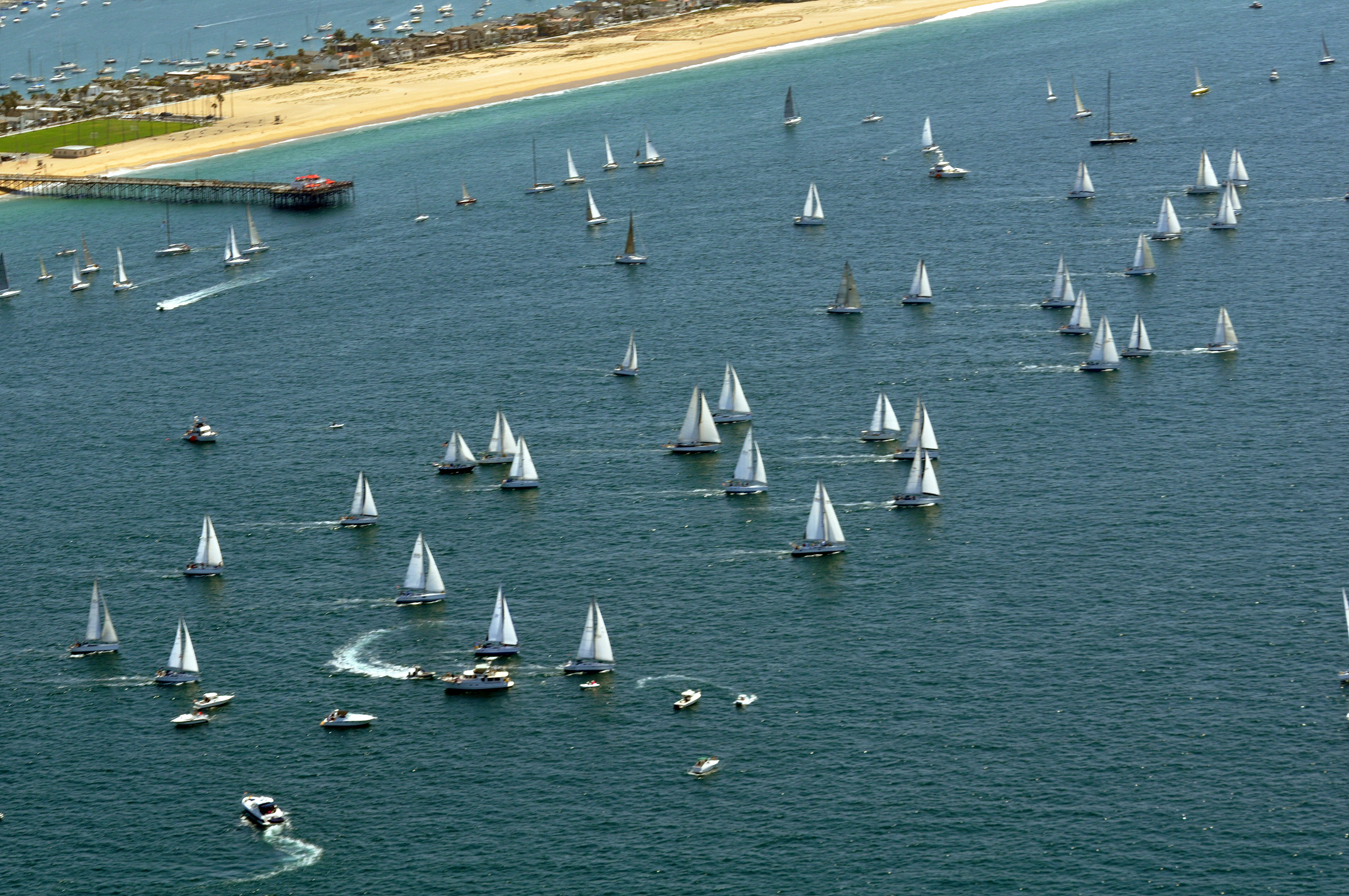
2013 Newport to Ensenada International Yacht Race

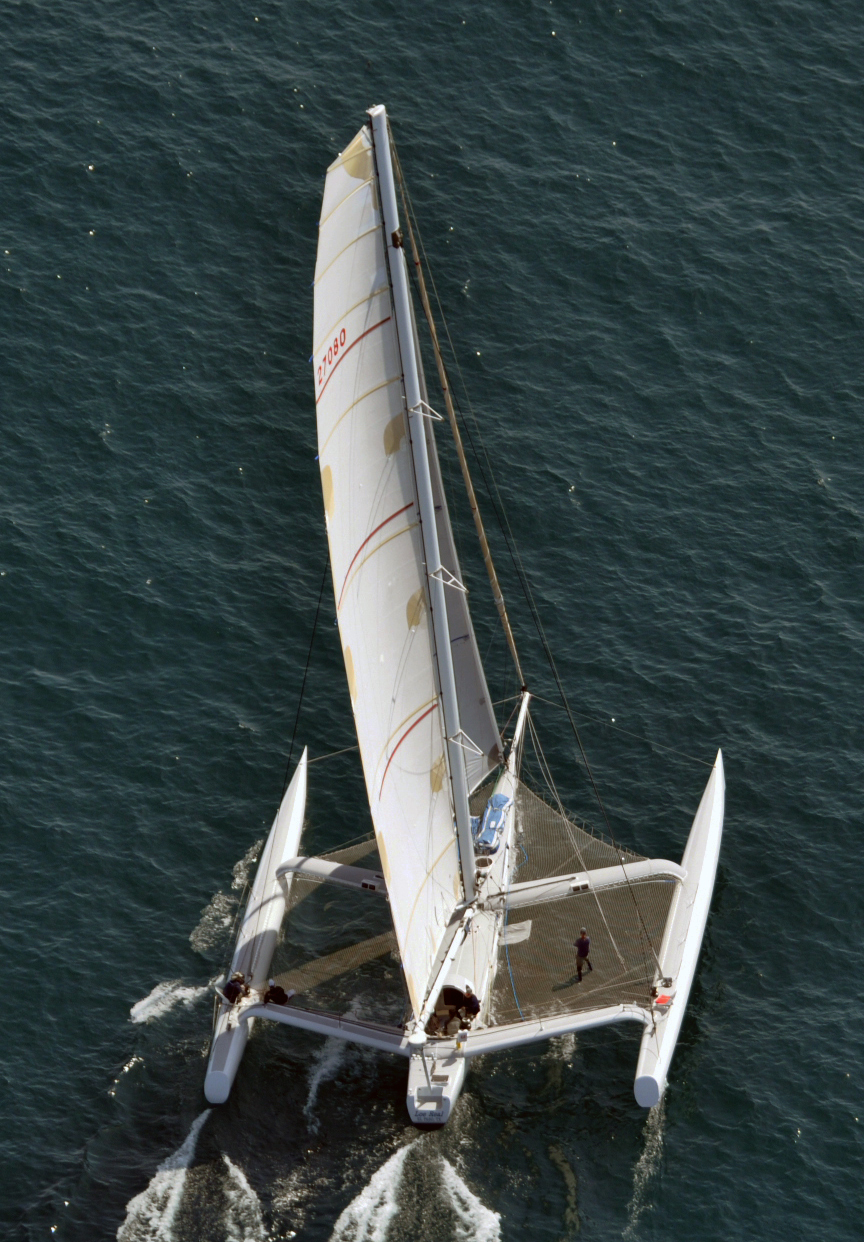
Loe Real 60-foot Water World Tri 2013

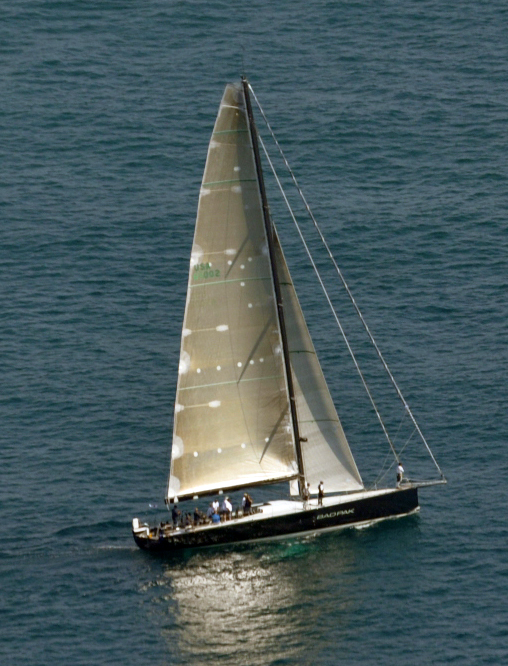
2012 Newport to Ensenada International Yacht Race first to finish yacht Bad Pak

The Newport to Ensenada Yacht Race is an annual 125-nautical-mile international yacht race. First run in 1948, sailors gather each spring in Newport Beach, California, to participate in one of the West Coast's premier regattas. The Newport to Ensenada Yacht Race (N2E) is a race to the city of Ensenada, Baja California.

== History ==
The race was created by sailors at the Balboa Yacht Club on Bayside Drive, and the Newport Harbor Yacht Club.

Humphrey Bogart was among the original instigators of the first official race in 1948. He sailed into the local history books along with Spencer Tracy and Errol Flynn (each in their boats). As one of the largest sailboat races in the nation, 'The Ensenada Race' is a top event for a broad spectrum of yachts - classes from day sailors to world-class maxi racers. Other notable racers include Walter Chronkite, movie producer Milton Bren, well-known actor Buddy Ebsen, comedian Vicki Lawrence, and Pulitzer Prize-winning cartoonist Paul Conrad.

Historically, the starting point was close to the Newport Harbor entrance in Corona Del Mar but thanks in part to the heavy boat traffic at the harbor mouth, the starting line was re-positioned some years ago to just offshore of the Balboa Pier on the Balboa Peninsula.

The modern Newport to Ensenada race is organized and run by the Newport Ocean Sailing Association. The record for the fastest time (6 hours, 46 minutes, and 40 seconds) was set in 1998 by Stars & Stripes, captained by America's Cup sailing champion Dennis Conner.

With over 20 classes represented, the race provides competitions for a variety of sea-going sailboats ranging from large ultra-light and maxi-yachts to smaller yachts in non-spinnaker classes.

Doug Baker's Andrews 80 from Long Beach "Magnitude 80", holds a race record for monohulls of 10 hours 37 minutes 50 seconds—7 minutes 3 seconds faster than the record of 10:44:54 set by Roy E. Disney's Pyewacket III, a Reichel/Pugh 77 in 2003.

The multihull record of 6:46:40 set by Steve Fossett's 60-foot Stars and Stripes catamaran in 1998 remains intact as the only boat ever to finish before sundown, although in 2014 two Maxi trimarans finished in under 8 hours, finishing the race in 7:40 & 7:42 respectively: "Orion" followed by "Mighty Merloe".

In 2009, boat designer Randy Reynolds was denied entry into the race by the organizers, citing his twin-hulled catamaran was too prone to capsizing. Reynolds in response created the Border Run, a Newport Beach to San Diego race billed as a safer alternative.

The 2009 race moved the start to allow spectators on Balboa Pier it had previously been set just outside the entrance to Newport Bay. Winds blew steadily from start to finish at 9-12 knots, even in Todos Santos Bay near the finish line, and from an off-wind direction that allowed everyone to sail the rhumb (direct) line. Of 260 starters, there were 257 finishers, and all finished by 4 p.m. Saturday, 19 hours ahead of the usual 11 a.m. Sunday cutoff time.

During the 2012 race, the yacht Aegean was wrecked with four fatalities, the first in the event's history. The boat likely collided with North Coronado Island, where debris was found.

2014 saw strong headwinds for most of the race, with the "MOD 70 Trimaran" first to finish "Orion" finishing in 7 hours and 40 minutes with "MIGHTY MERLOE" an ORMA 60 Trimaran finishing at 7 hours and 42 minutes. The Maxi yacht "Wizard" finished the 2014 race in 11:38:34 making it the first mono-hull. The fleet experienced seas of up to 8 feet as well as a heavy rain shower approx. 4 am Saturday morning making the race a rather wet one. The strong winds assisted most of the 2014 fleet in finishing the race in under 24 hours.

== Trophy Classes ==
NOSA awards a variety of trophies to the winners of the Ensenada race, ranging from the First to Finish - Corrected and Elapsed Times, to various PHRF class winners, to specialized trophies for particular one design classes like the Beneteau cruising class, to the first all female crewed boat to finish to the Spittoon trophy, given to the last boat to finish the race.

== First to finish ==
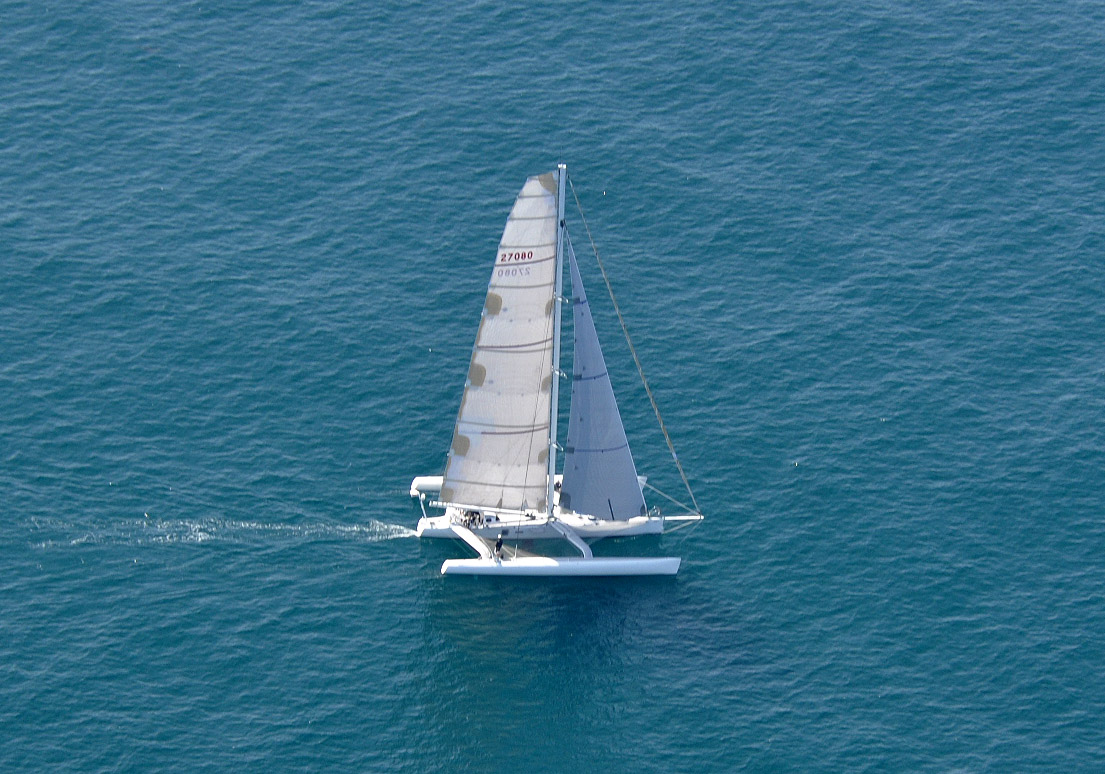
LoeReal 60 foot Waterworld trimaran 2009, 2010 & 2013 First to Finish

- 1948 Albert Long
- Dick Rheem, 1953 - Morning Star, 96' OR Monohull
- Howard Ahmanson, 1954, 1955, 1956, 1959 - Sirius, 10m OR Monohull
- Warren Seaman, 1955 - Tokerau (Unofficial First), 32' Proa, inspired by the outrigger canoes of Hawaii.
- Ken Murphy/Rudy Choy, 1957 - Aikane, 46' Choy Catamaran (pre-C/S/K)
- Louis Statham, 1958 - Nam Sang, OR Monohull
- Richard Steele, 1960 - Odyssey, 57' OR Monohull
- Carter Pyle/Mickey Munoz, 1960 - (Unofficial First), 18' P-Cat
- Arnold Haskell, 1961, 1962 - Chubasco, 67' OR Monohull
- John Pursell, 1962 - Patty Cat (Unofficial First), 27' C/S/K Cat
- Jack Swart, 1963, 1964 - Imua!, 36' C/S/K Cat
- John Pursell, 1965, 1966, 1969 - Patty Cat II, 44' C/S/K Cat
- Ken Murphy, 1967 - Aikane, 46' Choy Cat (pre-C/S/K)
- James Arness, 1968 - Seasmoke, 58' C/S/K Cat
- Boy Scouts of America, 1970 - Seasmoke, 58' C/S/K Cat
- Michael Kane, 1972 and 1980
- Rudy Choy, in 1985, 1987, and 1988.
- Steve Fossett, 1995, 1997, and 1998.
- Dennis Conner, first in 1989, 1990, 1991, 1992, 1993, 1994, and 1996.
- Mike Leneman first in 2000,
- Bill Gibbs in 2002, 2003, 2004, and 2011.
- Loe Enloe in 2009, 2010, and 2013.
- The yacht Ragtime was first in 1975 and 1977.
- 1982 winners were P. McEachern, B. Gardner, and H. Schofield in a Merlin.
- In 1985 it was Fred Preiss on Christine.
- Roy Disney was fastest in 1999, 2001 and 2006.
- Mike Cambell & Stephen Williams won in 2005.
- Doug Baker in 2007 and 2008.
- Tom Holthus in 2012.
- USA 02, "ORION" won with a time of 07:40:38 in 2014.
