= Robert Dix (sailor) =

Irish sailor

Personal information
- Nationality: Irish
- Born: 2 February 1953 (age 73)

Sport
- Sport: Sailing

Robert Dix (born 2 February 1953) is an Irish sailor. He competed in the 470 event at the 1976 Summer Olympics.
