= José Cobos Benítez =

Spanish wheelchair basketball player

José Cobos
Personal information
- Full name: José Cobos Benítez
- Nationality: Spanish
- Born: 2 January 1963 (age 63) Málaga, Spain

Sport
- Country: Spain
- Sport: Wheelchair basketball

José Cobos Benítez (born 2 January 1963 in Málaga) is a wheelchair basketball athlete from Spain. He has a physical disability: he is a 3-point wheelchair basketball player. He played wheelchair basketball at the 1996 Summer Paralympics. His team was fourth.

== Biography ==
=== Early life and disability ===
José Cobos Benítez was born on 2 January 1963 in Villanueva de Algaidas, Province of Málaga, Spain. He was affected by poliomyelitis at eight months of age, which led to a prolonged stay of eight years at the Civil Hospital of Málaga, where he grew up and received his early education. At the age of nine, he returned with his family to his hometown, specifically to the district of La Atalaya, where he continued his studies. Later, at the age of eleven, he moved to Alcalá de Guadaíra (Seville) to attend the San Juan de Dios school, an institution specializing in education for children with disabilities.

=== Early sporting career ===
During his time at San Juan de Dios, Cobos was introduced to a wide range of sports, including futsal, swimming, athletics, and wheelchair basketball. He also competed in table tennis for athletes with disabilities, participating in four Spanish championships between 1980 and 1984. He won two medals, including the Spanish doubles title in 1981 alongside Cristóbal Gallardo, and finished as runner-up in the team event in 1984.

=== Club career ===
Cobos began his wheelchair basketball career in the 1977–78 season with the San Juan de Dios team, remaining there until the 1984–85 season. He later played for Safemi in San Fernando and subsequently joined ACMA Sport in Algeciras, where he contributed to the club’s promotion from the lower divisions to the Primera División.

In 1990, he signed for CD ONCE Sevilla, where he played a key role in the team's rise to the División de Honor and its domestic dominance, winning three Spanish league titles (1992–1994) and two Copa del Rey titles (1992 and 1994). After four seasons, he moved to Madrid to join Fundosa ONCE.

At Fundosa ONCE, Cobos spent fourteen seasons (1994–2008) and served as team captain. During this period, he won nine league titles, eight Copa del Rey trophies, and the IWBF Champions Cup in 1997. The team also finished as runners-up in the European competition on three occasions. In total, Cobos accumulated 12 league titles, 10 national cups, and one European Cup at club level.

=== International career ===
Cobos was a member of the Spain men's national wheelchair basketball team from 1991 to 2001, earning 97 caps. He competed at the 1996 Summer Paralympics in Atlanta, where Spain finished fourth. He also participated in two Wheelchair Basketball World Championship tournaments (1994 and 1998) and seven European Wheelchair Basketball Championship editions, winning a silver medal in 1995.

Spain narrowly missed a bronze medal at the 1996 Paralympics after losing to the United States in the third-place match. The team had performed strongly in the group stage and knockout rounds before falling short in the semifinals and bronze medal game.

=== Retirement and later life ===
Cobos retired from professional wheelchair basketball in 2008 after a 31-season career. He was honored by Fundosa ONCE in a testimonial match against the China men's national wheelchair basketball team, and his number 10 jersey was retired by the club. Following his retirement, he settled in Dos Hermanas with his family.
