= Roberto Sponza =

Italian yacht racer

Roberto Sponza (born 20 August 1951 in Trieste, Italy) is an Italian yacht racer who competed in the 1976 Summer Olympics.
