= Cherub (dinghy) =

Single-trapeze racing skiff

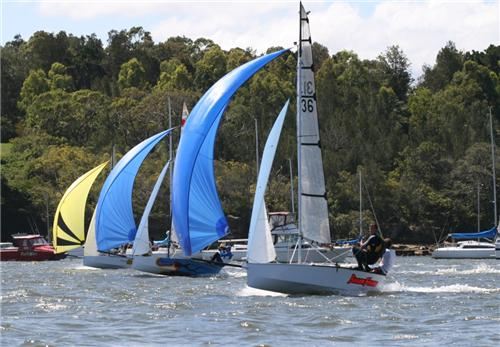

Development
- Designer: John Spencer
- Year: 1951-present

Boat
- Crew: 2

Hull
- Hull weight: 50 kg (110 lb)
- LOA: 3.658 m (12.00 ft)
- Beam: 1.753 m (5 ft 9.0 in)

Rig
- Mast height: 6.7 m (22 ft)

The Cherub is a 12 feet long, high performance, two-person, planing dinghy first designed in 1951 in New Zealand by John Spencer (d 1996). The class is a development (or "box rule") class, allowing for significant variation in design between different boats within the rule framework. The minimum hull weight was originally 110 lbs.

== History ==
In 1951 New Zealand naval architect John Spencer designed a 12-foot dinghy for his friend Ray Early to sail on Auckland Harbour. The boat was built to race in the Pennant Class and was named Cherub. Its superiority over other designs in the Pennant Class was immediately evident. Within a very short period of time a number of boats were racing in Auckland. A New Zealand class owner's association was established in 1952.

The first manufacturer in the United Kingdom was McCutcheon's of Cowes in 1956. By 1963 there were 112 Cherubs registered in the UK. Basil Wright was instrumental in introducing the class to Australia when a fleet of six Cherubs were built at the Mounts Bay Sailing Club for the 1960-61 sailing season. The class spread quickly in Australia and when the first Australian National Championships were raced in 1963–64 at Newhaven Yacht Squadron in Victoria, there were representatives from Western Australia, Victoria and Queensland.

The 1st World Cherub Championship were sailed on the Swan River in Perth Western Australia in 1970.

The World Series was conceived by Basil Wright, then commodore of the Mounts Bay Sailing Club. Wright corresponded with countries around the world and planning for the series took over a year. There were five clubs that hosted the series. New Zealanders Russell Bowler and Peter Walker had taken a year off work and arrived in Perth in February 1969 for the series. They stayed at the home of Basil Wright. Bowler, an engineer, designed and built his controversial boat Jennifer Julian from foam - fibreglass - sandwich hull construction. As he did not contest the NZ Selection series he was eligible to be selected in the WA Cherub team. Full teams were expected for the series and by October 1969 all Australian states except NT and Tasmania were entered. New Zealand had eight entries with two entries each from Great Britain and the US and one from New Guinea.

The Cherub Class International Association was formed in 1967. The inaugural World Championship were sailed on the Swan River in Perth WA in early 1970. This being the first time Perth had hosted a World Series. The title was won by Jennifer Julian sailed by Russell Bowler and Peter Walker. Runner up was Jazzer from Sydney sailed by Jamie Wilmot. His sister Jeanine Wilmot (Vayu) won the women's title. Ken Beashel built, rigged and tuned Jazzer. Jazzer had to win the final heat to win the title. The Cadet and Junior titles were won by Jamie Wilmot from Shadrack sailed by Michael Nash from Sydney. Shadrack was designed and built by Dave Fraser.

RESULTS: INAUGURAL WORLD CHERUB TITLE PERTH 1970 - Jennifer Julian 1809 (Russell Bowler, Peter Walker. WA(NZ) 8007 points, 1; Jazzer 1629 (Jamie Wilmot, Tony Barnes. NSW) 7433 pts, 2; Ace III 1815 (Gordon Lucas, Phil Arnold. WA) 6576 pts, 3; Shadrack 1631 (Michael Nash, Michael Oram. NSW) 6438 pts, 4. The Cadet and Junior World Titles: 1st Jazzer 1629, 2nd Shadrack 1631.

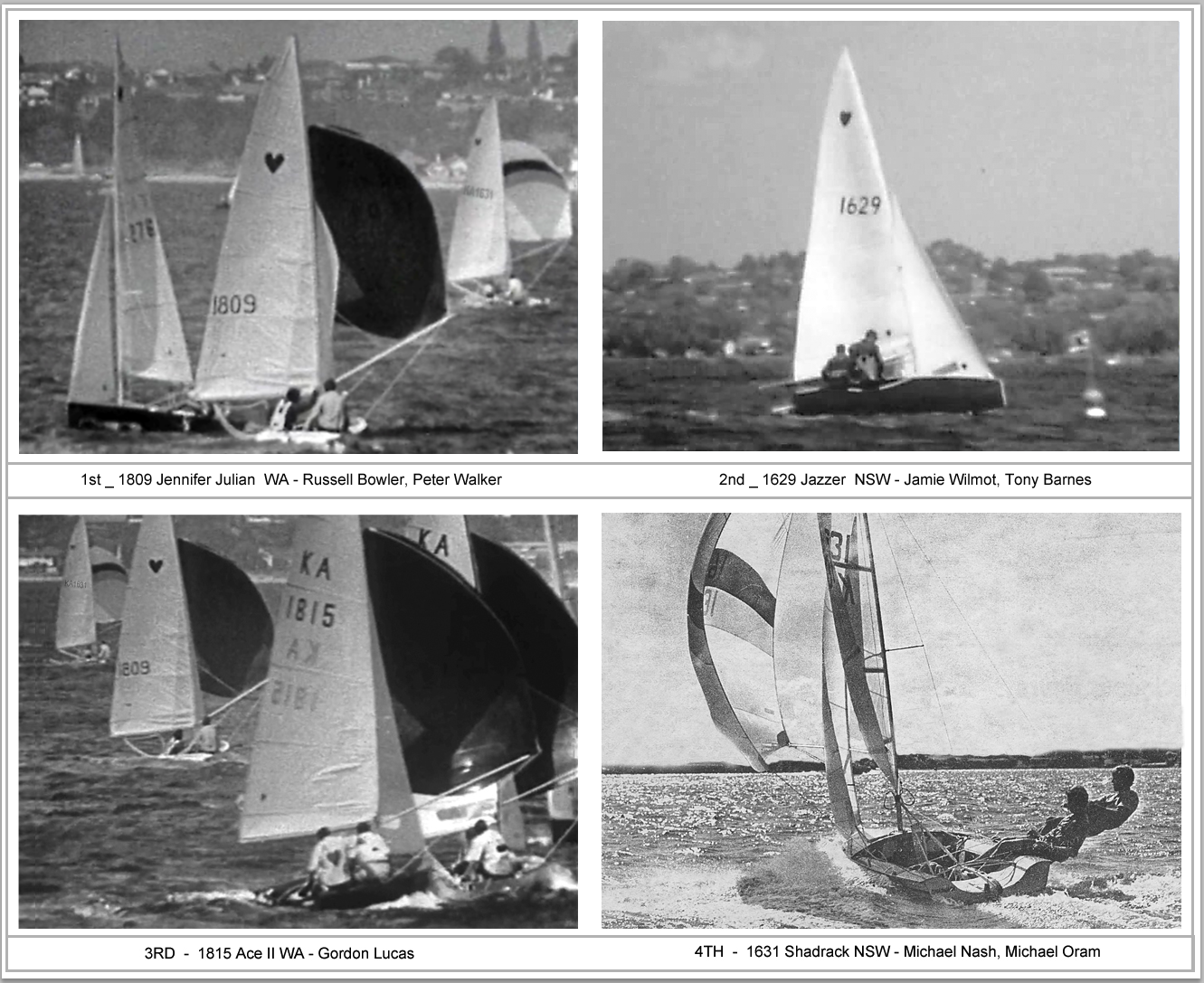

== Design ==
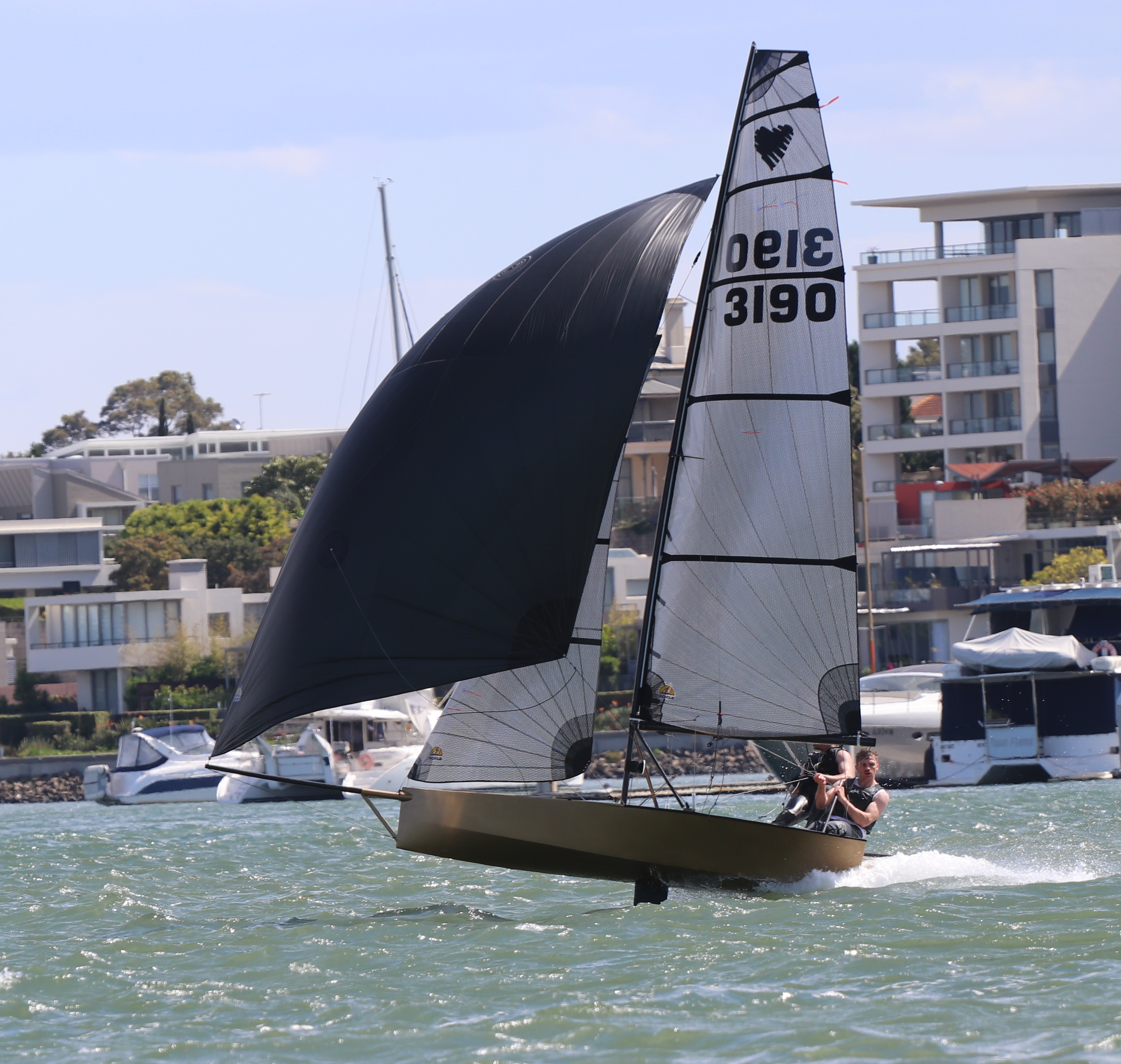
The Cherub is a high performance two person dinghy.

The Cherub is Bermuda-rigged with trapeze(s), and has a crew of two. The Cherub has been through a number of changes. In the 1950s the designs had considerable keel rocker. The most popular design from this era was Spencer's Mk7 built in plywood but by 1971 most successful designs had much less rocker and flatter sections aft to promote planing. Considerable care was needed to achieve the 110 lbs hull weight. In 1970 the small jib was enlarged to an overlapping genoa about 8 square feet bigger. By the late 1960s new boats were being built with aluminium masts which were lighter and stiffer. Up to 1980 boats were generally built from 3 and 4 mm plywood but after this some were made from foam sandwich construction pioneered by Russell Bowler in New Zealand. Some Cherubs did dual service in New Zealand sailing in the Q class (unrestricted 12 ft). The Cherub hull was used with a short bowsprit, a taller mast and much larger sail area with both the crew and skipper using trapezes.

Current Cherubs use an asymmetric spinnaker system but earlier boats used relatively large double luff spinnakers and used a notably long (9 foot) spinnaker pole. Cherubs have a high power-to-weight ratio and are very quick downwind in stronger breezes but can be slow upwind in lighter airs compared to longer boats.

The class differs in detail specification between the Northern and Southern Hemispheres. The Northern boats, often referred to as UK Cherubs, use a second trapeze and permit appreciably larger sails than the Southern Hemisphere boats.

The Australian Cherub PY is tentatively set at 100 for 2019/20.

== Sailing and Racing ==
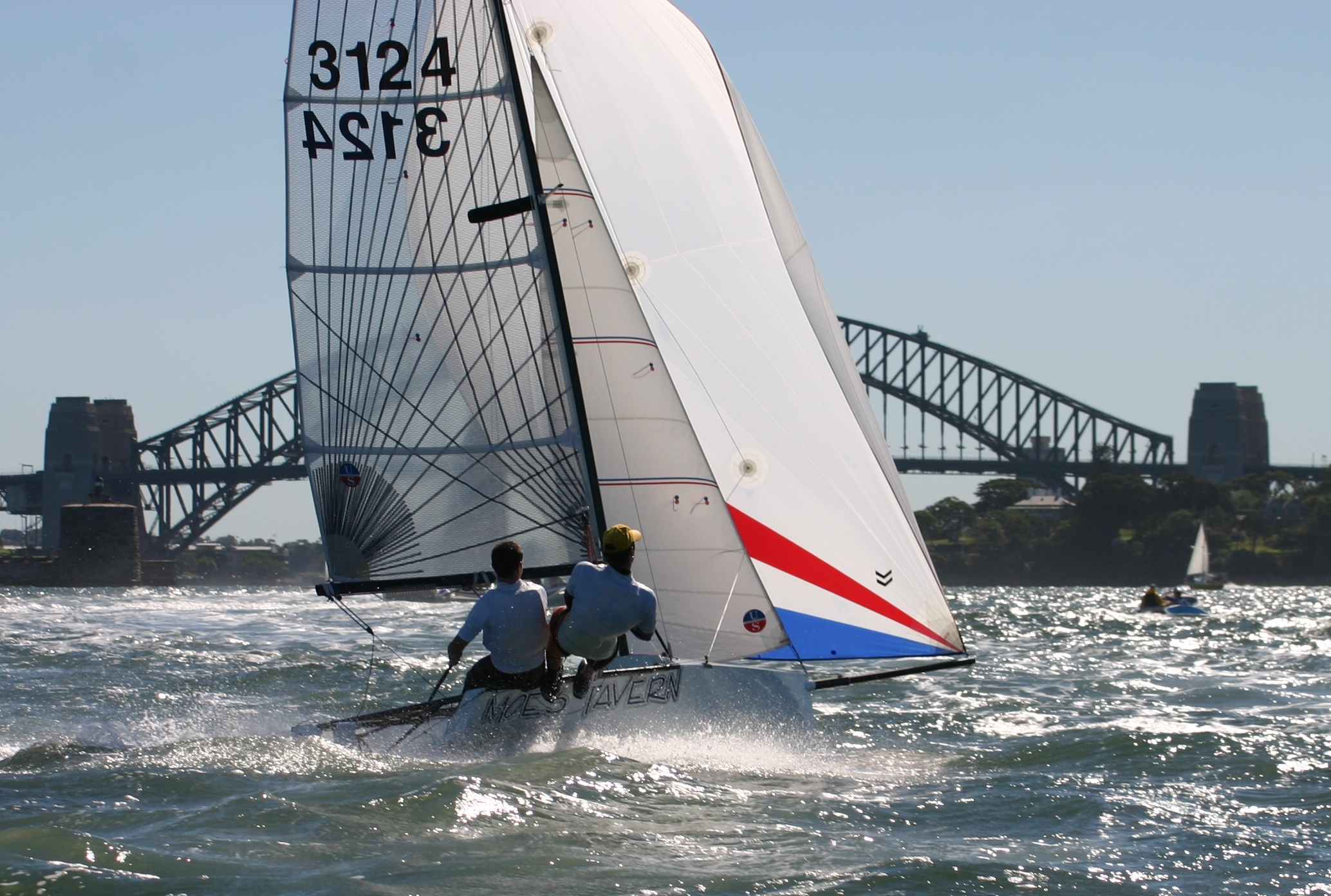
Cherub dinghy sailing on Sydney Harbour

In the 1960s and 1970s the Cherub was a popular sailing dinghy in New Zealand when they were mainly amateur built. Cherubs are nowadays mainly sailed in Australia and the UK, with some boats in other countries, notably France and small numbers in New Zealand.

== Regattas ==
=== Australia ===
- Australian Cherub National Championships

=== United Kingdom ===
- United Kingdom Cherub National Championships

=== International ===
- World Championships
