= Georg Winter (historian) =

German historian and archivist

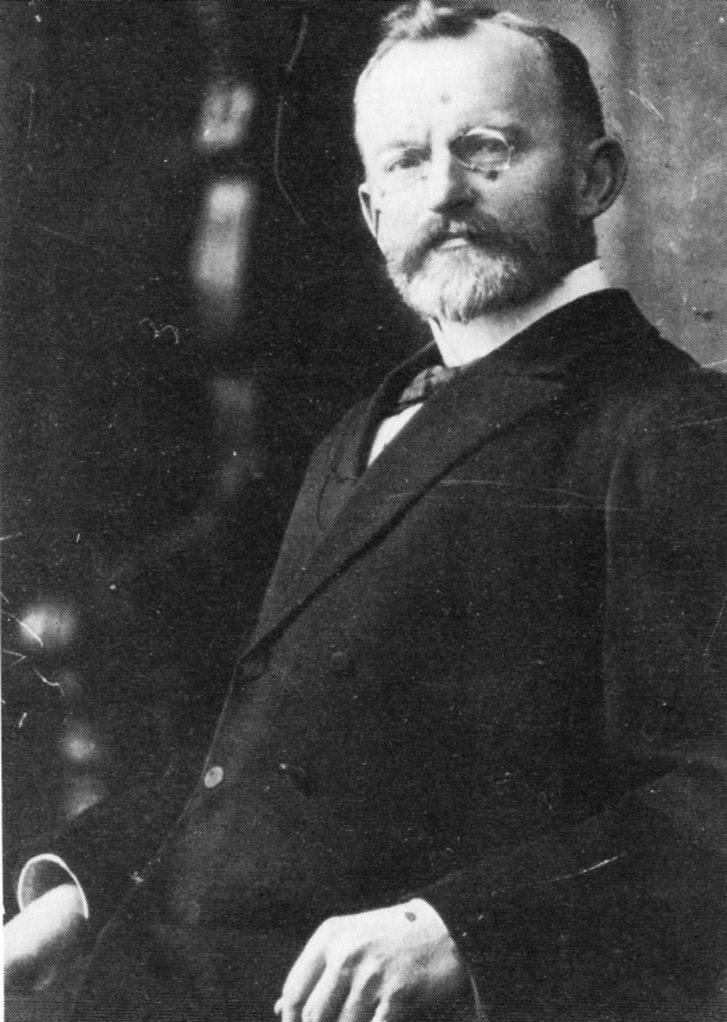
Georg Winter

Carl Georg Ludwig Winter (3 February 1856, Breslau – 1 September 1912, Magdeburg) was a German historian and archivist.

He studied history and philology at the Universities of Breslau and Berlin, obtaining his doctorate in 1878 from the University of Göttingen. From 1879 he worked at the Staatsarchiv (state archives) in Berlin, Düsseldorf, Marburg, Magdeburg, Stettin and Osnabrück, where in 1903 he became director of archives. Afterwards he returned to Magdeburg, where in 1906 he succeeded Eduard Ausfeld (1850-1906) as director of archives. At Magdeburg he was tasked with issues involving construction of the new archives building on Augustastraße (now called Hegelstraße).

Among his written works was Geschichte des 30jährigen Krieges (History of the Thirty Years War, 1893), and highly regarded biographies of Hans Joachim von Zieten (two volumes, 1886) and Frederick the Great (two volumes, 1907).

He was a member of the Historischen Kommission für die Provinz Sachsen und das Herzogtum Anhalt (Historical Commission for the Province of Saxony and the Duchy of Anhalt), and chairman of the Vereins für Geschichte und Alterthumskunde des Herzogtums und Erzstifts Magdeburg (Association for history and antiquities of the duchy, and archbishopric of Magdeburg).
