= Georgetown Hoyas football =

Varsity football team of Georgetown University

2026 Georgetown Hoyas football team
- First season: 1874; 152 years ago (Note: The team was founded in 1874, but did not play any games that year. They scheduled their first game in the 1881 season (145 years ago), against a local high school, but the latter failed to show up for the game and it was considered a Georgetown forfeit win.)
- Athletic director: Lee Reed
- Head coach: Rob Sgarlata; 11th season, 41–80 (.339)
- Location: Washington, D.C.
- Stadium: Cooper Field (capacity: 4,418)
- NCAA division: Division I FCS
- Conference: Patriot League
- Colors: Blue and gray
- All-time record: 501–466–32 (.518)
- Bowl record: 0–2 (.000)

Conference championships
- SAIAA: 1912, 1915, 1917, 1919 MAAC: 1997, 1998
- Consensus All-Americans: 18
- Rivalries: Catholic University (rivalry)

Uniforms
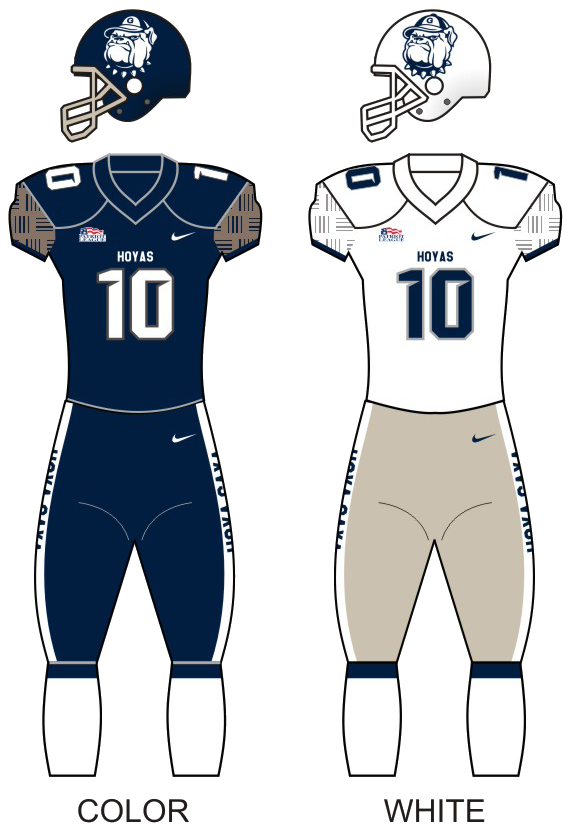
- Fight song: There Goes Old Georgetown
- Mascot: Jack the Bulldog
- Website: GUHoyas.com

The Georgetown Hoyas football team represents Georgetown University in the Division I Football Championship Subdivision level of college football. Like other sports teams from Georgetown, the team is named the Hoyas, which derives from the chant, Hoya Saxa. They play their home games at Cooper Field on the Georgetown University campus in Washington, D.C. Their best season in the recent era was produced in 2011 when the team produced an 8–3 record.

== History ==
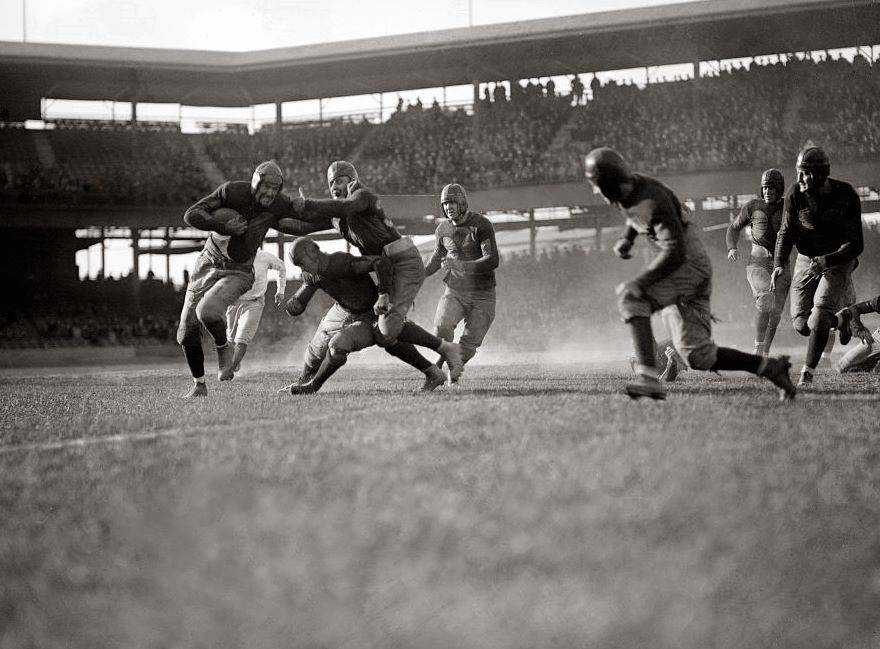
Georgetown versus Quantico Marines in 1923

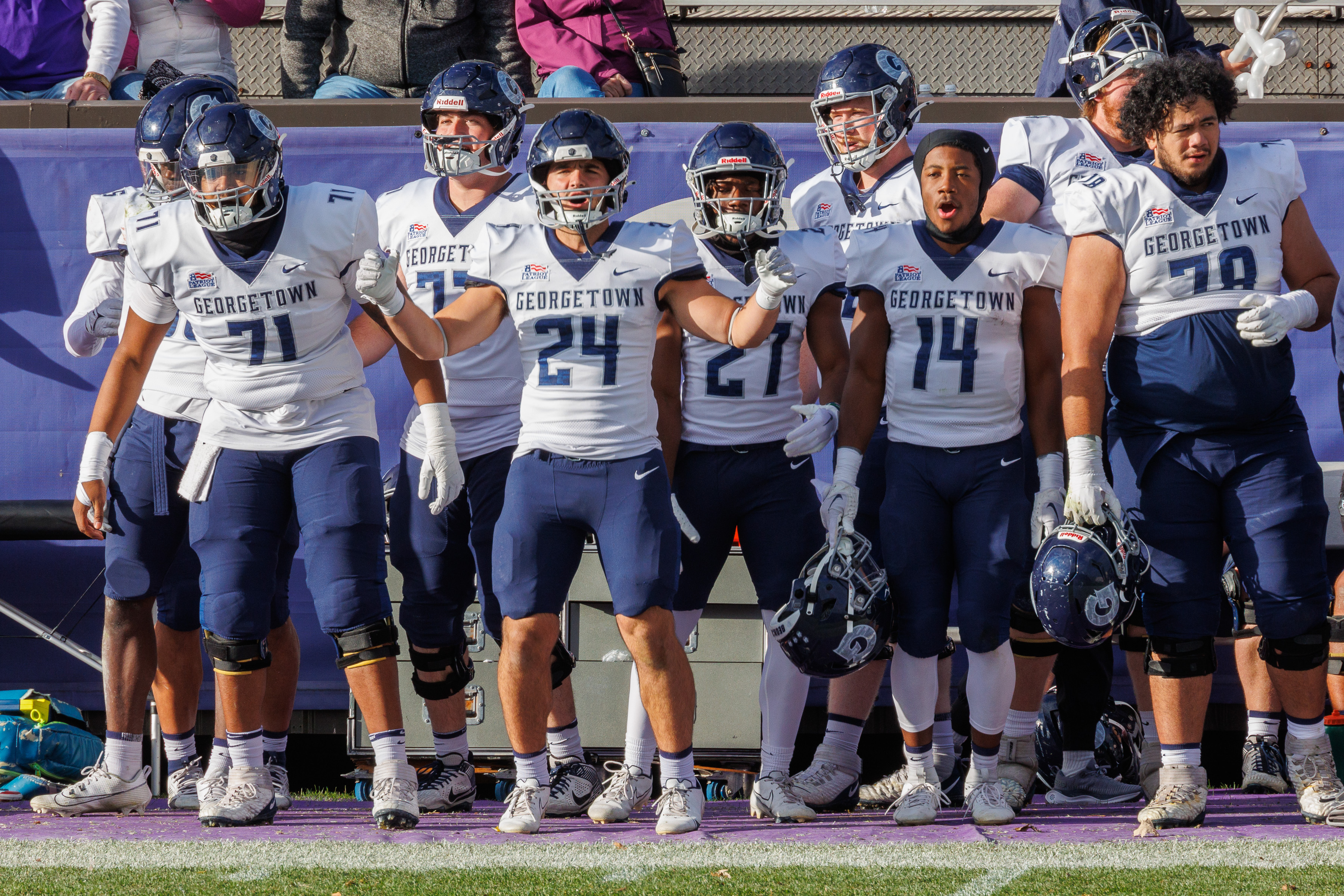
Members of 2023 team

The first football team at Georgetown was formed on November 1, 1874. There were results recorded in the 1881, 1883 and 1884 seasons, but since 1950 Georgetown has only recognized seasons starting with 1887. By the 1940s, Georgetown played in the Orange Bowl, where they lost 14–7 to Mississippi State in 1941.

As the college game became more expensive after World War II, Georgetown's program began to lose money rapidly. The Hoyas' last successful season was 1949, when they lost in the Sun Bowl against Texas Western.

After a 2–7 season in 1950, Georgetown attempted to salvage its program by softening its schedule, replacing major opponents such as Penn State, Miami, and Tulsa with Richmond, Bucknell, and Lehigh. The program was losing too much money, however, and on March 22, 1951, the university's president canceled the football program.

In 1962, Georgetown allowed its students to start a football program as an exhibition-only club sport. New games began in 1964, with their first match drawing 8,000 spectators to see the Hoyas host another university with an unofficial program, New York University (NYU). Varsity football resumed in 1970 at what later became known as the Division III level. In 1976, Georgetown began an annual rivalry game with the Catholic University Cardinals for the Steven Dean Memorial Trophy. The competition ended in 1993, when Georgetown moved into the Division I Football Championship Subdivision because of NCAA legislation forbidding Division I or II schools from playing football in lower divisions.

In 1993, the team joined the Metro Atlantic Athletic Conference, a mostly Catholic conference on the East Coast. With eight wins, the team won the conference championship outright in 1997, and were co-champions in 1998 with nine wins.

In 2001 the team joined the Patriot League, with the lowest football budget in the league. In 2022, the Patriot League transitioned to 60 full scholarships but Georgetown remained non-scholarship, further hurting its competitiveness in that conference. The Hoyas have posted just one winning season since 2000, an 8–3 record in 2011, just prior to the Patriot League's decision to add scholarships. Head coach Kevin Kelly was named the conference Coach of the Year.

=== Classifications ===
- 1951–1963: No team
- 1964–1969: National Club Football Association
- 1970–1972: NCAA College Division
- 1973–1992: NCAA Division III
- 1993–present: NCAA Division I-AA/FCS

=== Conference memberships ===
- 1881–1906: Independent
- 1907–1921: South Atlantic Intercollegiate Athletic Association
- 1922–1950: Independent
- 1951–1963: No team
- 1964–1972: Independent
- 1973–1992: NCAA Division III independent
- 1993–2000: Metro Atlantic Athletic Conference
- 2001–present: Patriot League

== Stadiums ==
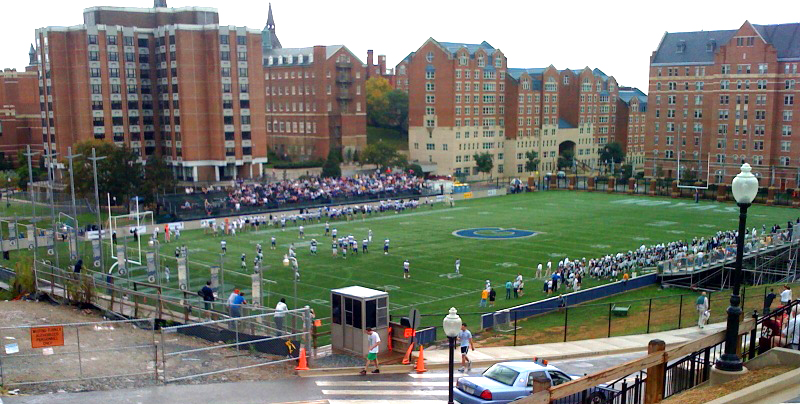
The Hoyas currently play their home games on Cooper Field.

Georgetown has played football at various on-campus intramural fields. From 1891 until 1893, the stadium known as Boundary Field played host to Georgetown football. From 1921 until 1950, Griffith Stadium played host to Georgetown football.

Currently, the Hoyas play at Cooper Field, previously called Multi-Sport Field, which was upgraded from Harbin Field in 2003. Construction on Cooper Field was sidelined for 15 years until it was completed in 2020. The facility opened in the fall of 2021 with capacity for 4,418.

== D.C. Cup Rivalry Game ==
The Hoyas had a brief cross-town rivalry with Howard University for a title known as the DC Mayor's Cup (awarded by the mayor of Washington). Three games were held (2008, 2009 and 2011). The series has Georgetown leading 2–1–0 following their 2011 victory. The series was slated to resume in 2019 but Howard discontinued the series to sign a series instead with Maryland.

== Conference championships ==
The Hoyas have won six conference championships, highlighted by a run of four conference championships in seven years, although Georgetown went 78 years without a conference championship, in part due to not being part of a conference from 1921 to 1993.

Year	Conference	Coach	Overall record	Conference record
1912	South Atlantic Intercollegiate Athletic Association	Frank Gargan	8–1	5–0
1915†	South Atlantic Intercollegiate Athletic Association	Albert Exendine	7–2	2–0
1917	South Atlantic Intercollegiate Athletic Association	Albert Exendine	7–1	2–0
1919	South Atlantic Intercollegiate Athletic Association	Albert Exendine	7–3	2–0
1997	Metro Atlantic Athletic Conference	Bob Benson	8–3	7–0
1998†	Metro Atlantic Athletic Conference	Bob Benson	9–2	6–1

† denotes co-championship.

== Bowl games ==
Georgetown competed in two major bowl games, including a New Year's Day bowl game.

Bowl	Date	Opponent	Result
Orange Bowl	January 1, 1941	Mississippi State	L 7–14
Sun Bowl	January 1, 1950	Texas Western	L 20–33

== Polling ==
Georgetown was ranked in the AP Poll while a member of the Major College Division.

Season	Poll(s)	Rank
1940	AP Poll	13

== Alumni ==
Perhaps the football team's most accomplished athlete was Al Blozis, who played for the NFL's New York Giants before being killed in action in World War II. Blozis's great athletic accomplishments, however, came in shot put and discus. He set the world indoor record for the shot put, throwing it 56 feet 4.5 inches in 1941. He was the national indoor and outdoor shot put champion in both 1942 and 1943.

"Big Jim" Ricca, an NFL defensive end and offensive lineman, graduated in 1949 and was the last Hoya to play in an NFL game.

Jim Schwartz, former head coach of the NFL's Detroit Lions, was a four-year letterman at linebacker. He received Distinguished Economics Graduate honors and earned numerous honors in 1988, including Division III CoSIDA/GTE Academic All-America, All-America, and team captain.

In 2007, the Washington Redskins made Alex Buzbee a reserve player, becoming the first Georgetown player on an NFL team since Ricca retired in 1956. In 2010, Buzbee joined the Toronto Argonauts of the Canadian Football League.

Comedian and actor Jim Gaffigan was a wide receiver at Georgetown in 1985 after briefly playing at Purdue.

Nick Alfieri, former Hoyas linebacker who had over 300 tackles in his Georgetown career, played professionally in the German Football League for several seasons.

== Future non-conference opponents ==
Announced schedules as of August 31, 2026.

2026	2027	2028	2029	2035	2036
Columbia				at VMI	VMI
Cornell					
