= Landler =

Landler may refer to:

- Transylvanian Landler, a group of Protestants who were deported from Austria to Transylvania in the 18th century
- Ländler, a folk dance in the Southern parts of the German speaking territory in Europe and in Slovenia
- Jenő Landler (1875–1928), Hungarian Communist leader
- Mark Landler (born 1965), American journalist and author
