= Gabe Fleisher =

American journalist

- Born: November 8, 2001 (age 23)
- Education: Georgetown University
- Occupation: Journalist
- Years active: 2011–present
- Organization: Wake Up To Politics

Gabe Fleisher (born November 8, 2001) is an American journalist and, since 2011, the author of Wake Up To Politics, a daily political newsletter.

== Early life and education ==
Fleisher grew up in University City, Missouri. He is the son of Rabbi Randall Fleisher and sales director Amy Fleisher. He attended John Burroughs School and Georgetown University, where he majored in government with a minor in journalism, graduating in 2024.

== Wake Up To Politics ==
Fleisher credits the 2008 presidential election as sparking his interest in politics, and Mike Allen's Axios for inspiring him to launch a newsletter. In April 2011, at age nine, Fleisher began to write and publish "The Daily Rundown", with the lone subscriber being his mother. He began sending the newsletter to extended family, and it spread further after it was featured in the Clayton High School Globe and St. Louis Post-Dispatch. Later renamed Wake Up Call! and then Wake Up To Politics, the newsletter had 500 subscribers in 2015. Subscriptions to it again skyrocketed overnight in 2017 after the New York Times profiled it.

In May 2019, Fleisher was the first journalist to report that New York City Mayor Bill de Blasio was to run for president. In December 2019, Fleisher launched the Wake Up To Politics Podcast with St. Louis Public Radio. The podcast's 19 episodes were often about 20 minutes long and included an interview with a journalist about a specific topic.

Since Fleisher's arrival in Washington, D.C. in 2020 to study at Georgetown University, Wake Up To Politics has included more on-the-ground reports and interviews, including from the White House and U.S Capitol Building. In 2022, the newsletter had over 50,000 subscribers. It moved to Substack in 2024.

Fleisher has written for Georgetown's student newspaper The Hoya.
