= Bernard Muir =

American college athletics administrator (born 1968)

Biographical details
- Born: July 22, 1968 (age 58); Gainesville, Florida, U.S.
- Education: Brown University; Ohio University

Playing career

Basketball
- 1986–1990: Brown
- Position: Forward

Administrative career (AD unless noted)
- 2000–2003: Notre Dame (associate AD)
- 2003–2004: Notre Dame (senior assoc. AD)
- 2004–2005: Notre Dame (deputy AD)
- 2005–2009: Georgetown
- 2009–2012: Delaware
- 2012–2025: Stanford

Bernard Montgomery Muir (born July 22, 1968) is an American college athletics administrator who is served as athletic director at Stanford University from 2012 to 2025. Prior to Stanford, Muir served in the same position at the University of Delaware and Georgetown University.

== Early life and education ==
Born in Gainesville, Florida, Muir attended Brown University, where he earned a bachelor's degree in organizational behavior and management and played basketball, serving as the team's co-captain in his senior year. He went on to earn a master's degree in sports administration from Ohio University.

== Sports administration career ==
Muir worked as assistant director of the NCAA Division I men's basketball tournament and then joined the staff of Notre Dame athletic director Kevin White. In 2005, Muir was named athletic director at Georgetown University, and in 2009, was hired in the same position at the University of Delaware.

In 2012, following the departure of Bob Bowlsby to head the Big 12 Conference, Stanford named Muir as its seventh athletic director.

Muir serves on the NCAA Division I Men's Basketball Committee, which among other duties, serves as the selection committee for the NCAA Division I men's basketball tournament.

On February 24, 2025, Muir announced that he would step down as Stanford Cardinal athletic director at the conclusion of the 2024–25 academic year.

== Personal life ==
Muir and his wife, Liz, have two daughters.

In December 2014, Muir was announced as one of the six recipients of the 2015 Silver Anniversary Awards, presented annually by the NCAA to outstanding former student-athletes on the 25th anniversary of the end of their college sports careers. The award is based on both athletic and professional success.
