= Hoya Saxa =

Official cheer of Georgetown University

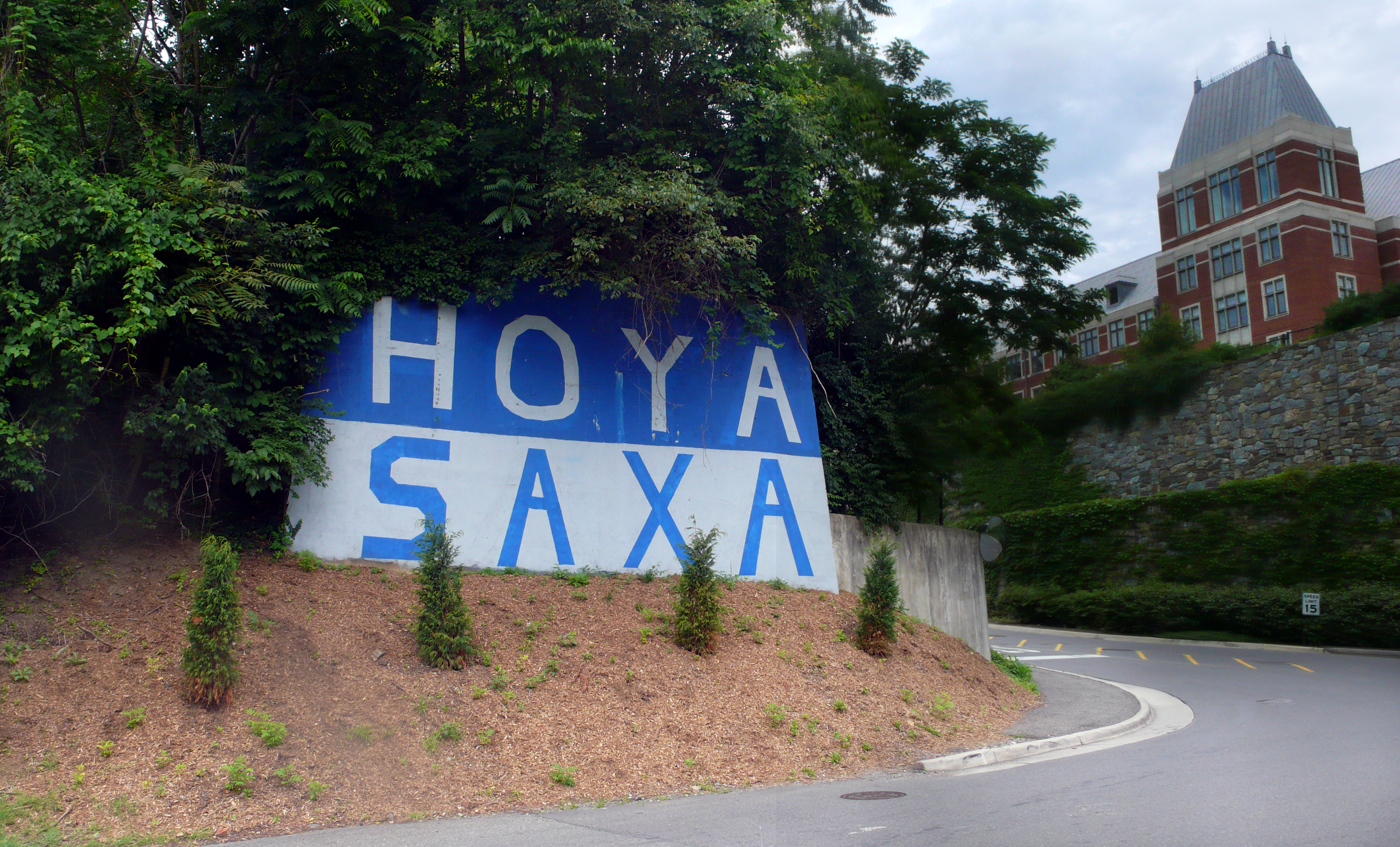
The phrase "Hoya Saxa" painted in large blue and gray letters at Georgetown's Canal Road entrance (now obscured)

Hoya Saxa (/ˈhɔɪə ˈsæksə/ HOY-ə SAK-sə) is the official cheer and "college yell" of Georgetown University and its athletics teams. The term hoya is an Ancient Greek word usually transliterated from οἵα as hoia from the word hoios (οἷος) meaning 'such' or 'what' as in 'what manner of,' and is used in certain biblical quotations. Saxa is Latin for 'rocks' or 'small stones.' It was used in the name of some Roman settlements, such as Saxa Rubra. Before 1900, students at Georgetown were required to study classical linguistics, and both words are in the neuter plural of their respective languages. The phrase together is generally translated into English as "what rocks!", though other translations have suggested "such rocks!" or "great rocks!" or even "what rocks?" as a question. It was also historically rendered as "Hoya, Hoya, Saxa!", a form that is used in "The Hoya Song" from 1930 which mocked the cheers of other universities, and was then included in the school fight song, "There Goes Old Georgetown".

The phrase was first used at Georgetown University sometime before 1893, when it was noted in publications about Georgetown's football games against Swarthmore College and the University of North Carolina at Chapel Hill. By 1894, chanting the phrase was considered a well-established tradition, and its use at commencement and alumni celebrations was also published. The exact origin or original use of the cheer is however unknown. Probable theories suggest it either refers to the stalwart defense of the football team or to one of the baseball teams, which was named the "Stonewalls". The baseball team was founded in 1870 while the football team formed in 1874, and the cheer was used at both sports' events by the 1890s. It might also refer to the actual stone wall that surrounds the campus, for which the baseball team was named.

By the 1920s, the term hoya began to be used as an adjective to describe students and their associations on campus, starting with the student-run sports newspaper The Hoya in 1920, and the school mascot in 1926. By 1929, the term Hoyas was applied to the athletics teams themselves by publications like The Washington Post. University president W. Coleman Nevils (1928–1935) encouraged this, and he was known to have suggested the name "Hoiah" be used at his previous school, College of the Holy Cross, for their student newspaper. Since the early 1990s, the phrase has been painted in large letters on an abandoned trolley trestle by the university's Canal Road entrance, though it is now obscured by shrubs. The sign is an occasional target of vandalism because of its association with school spirit. Word plays and rhymes using the phrase are common, including "Hoya Snaxa", the student-run snack shop. The school also hosts a "Hoya Saxa Weekend" each spring to attract minority applicants through a weekend campus immersion.

== See also ==
- Georgetown Preparatory School
