= Georgetown University Alma Mater =

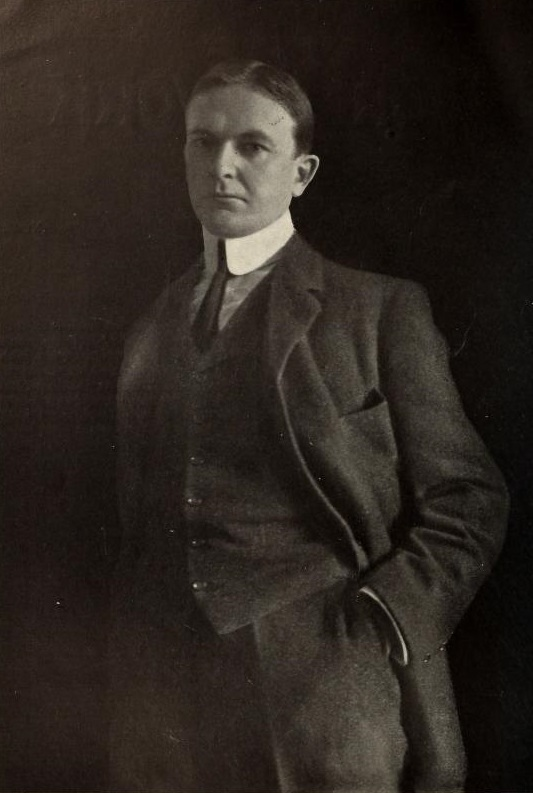
Robert J. Collier, the author of the Alma Mater

The Georgetown University Alma Mater is one of the traditional songs of Georgetown University, and the university's official and undisputed alma mater. It was written to the tune of the Welsh battle song Men of Harlech in 1894 by Robert J. Collier, a Georgetown student. The song is performed by the university orchestra and occasionally other groups at various school events, including commencements and athletic games.

The words and length of the alma mater have changed several times since the original writing, most notably in 1984, when the university changed the first line of the Alma Mater from "Sons of Georgetown, Alma Mater," to "Hail, oh Georgetown, Alma Mater," in an effort to promote gender equity.

== See also ==
- There Goes Old Georgetown
