= Georgetown Hoyas =

Intercollegiate sports teams of Georgetown University

- University: Georgetown University
- Nickname: The Hoyas
- NCAA: Division I (FCS)
- Conference: Big East Conference (primary); Patriot League (football, women's heavyweight rowing); EARC (men's rowing); EAWRC (women's lightweight rowing); MAISA (sailing); CSA (women's squash)
- Athletic director: Lee Reed
- Location: Washington, D.C.
- Varsity teams: 29 (13 men's, 15 women's, 1 co-ed)
- Football stadium: Cooper Field
- Basketball arena: Capital One Arena (men's); McDonough Gymnasium (women's)
- Baseball stadium: Capital One Park
- Softball stadium: Washington Nationals Youth Academy
- Soccer stadium: Shaw Field
- Lacrosse stadium: Cooper Field
- Rowing venue: Thompson's Boat Center
- Sailing venue: Washington Sailing Marina
- Other venues: Yates Field House
- Colors: Blue and gray
- Mascot: Jack the Bulldog
- Fight song: There Goes Old Georgetown
- Website: guhoyas.com
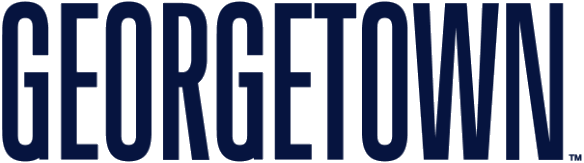

The Georgetown Hoyas are the collegiate athletics teams that officially represent Georgetown University, located in Washington, D.C. The Georgetown's athletics department fields 24 men's and women's varsity level teams and competes at the National Collegiate Athletic Association (NCAA) Division I level as a member of the Big East Conference, with the exception of the Division I FCS Patriot League in football and women's heavyweight rowing. The university also fields 5 non-NCAA varsity teams in men's heavyweight and lightweight rowing, women's lightweight rowing, women's squash, and sailing. In late 2012, Georgetown and six other Catholic, non-FBS schools announced that they were departing the Big East for a new conference. The rowing and sailing teams also participate in east coast conferences. The men's basketball team is the school's most famous and most successful program, but Hoyas have achieved success in a wide range of sports.

The team name is derived from the mixed Greek and Latin chant "Hoya Saxa" (meaning "What Rocks"), which gained popularity at the school in the late nineteenth century. The name "Hoyas" came into use in the 1920s. Their mascot is an anthropomorphic bulldog. Most teams have their athletic facilities on the main campus of Georgetown University. The men's basketball team plays most of their home games at the Capital One Arena in downtown Washington, D.C., and the baseball team plays at Capital One Park in Tysons, VA. Lee Reed took over as the school's athletic director in April 2010.

== Traditions ==
=== The word "Hoya" ===
The university says that the precise origin of the term "Hoya" is unknown. At some point before 1893, and likely before 1891, students versed in classical languages combined the Greek hoia or hoya, meaning "what" or "such", and the Latin saxa to form Hoya Saxa!, or "What Rocks!" This cheer may either refer to the stalwart defense of the football team, or to the baseball team, which was nicknamed the "Stonewalls", or to the actual stone wall that surrounds the campus. Father William McFadden, S.J., campus Jesuit and the team's in-house announcer at the Capital One Arena, has disputed the Greek and Latin origin, suggesting the classical words were retroactively applied to a nonsensical cheer.

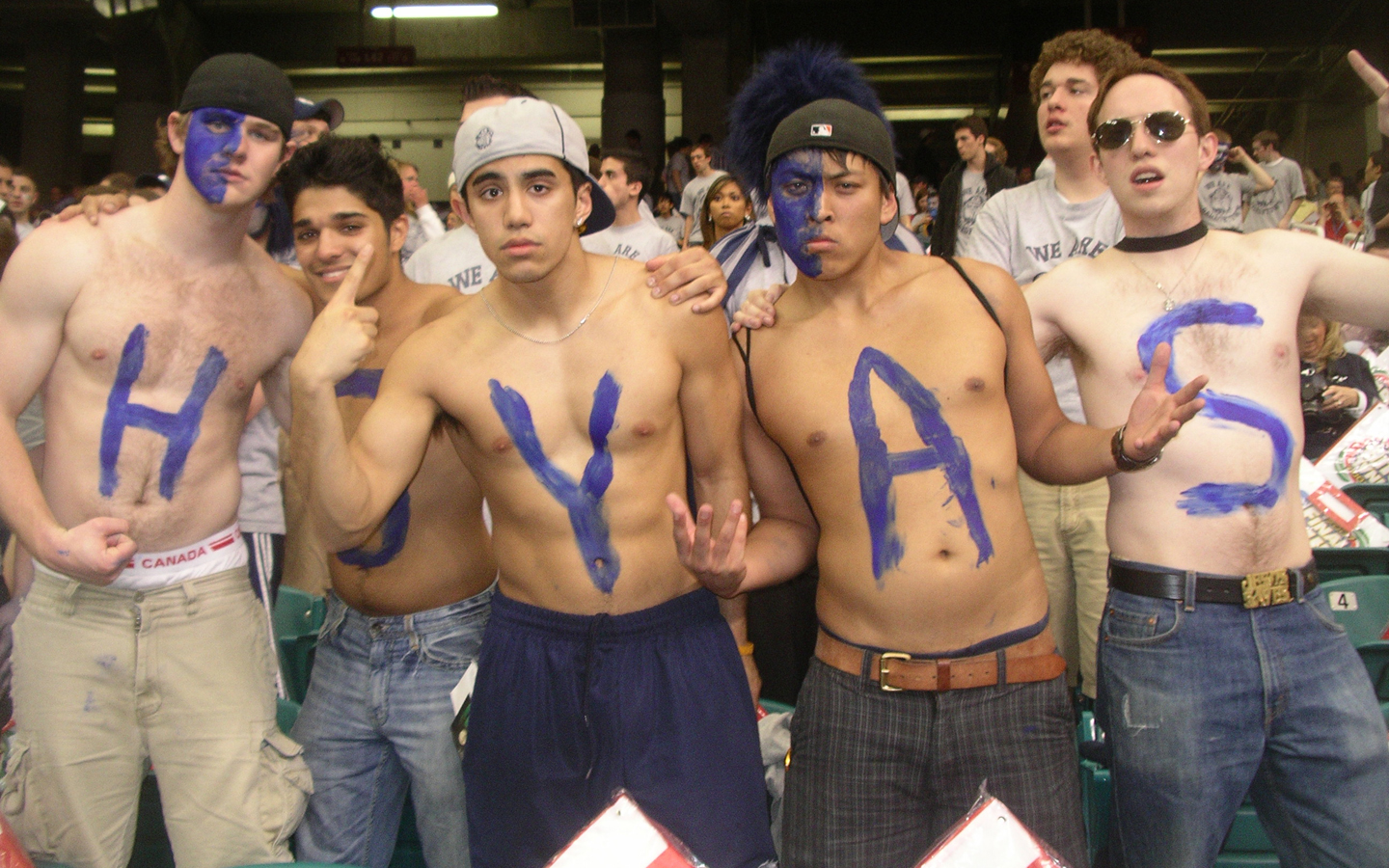
The name "Hoyas" derives from Georgetown's college yell, Hoya Saxa.

After World War I, the term "Hoya" was increasingly used on campus, including for the newspaper and the school mascot. In 1920, students began publishing the campus's first sports newspaper under the name The Hoya, after successfully petitioning the Dean of the college to use it instead of the proposed name, The Hilltopper. "Hilltoppers" was also a name sometimes used for the sports teams. By the fall of 1928, the newspaper had taken to referring to the sports teams as the Hoyas. This was influenced by a popular half time show at football games, where the mascot, a dog nicknamed "Hoya," would entertain fans.

Georgetown's unique team name has caused opponents to mock Georgetown with chants including "What's a Hoya?" Harrison High School, located in Kennesaw, Georgia, is the only other institution in the country licensed to share this name. However, Georgetown Preparatory School, which separated from the university in 1927, uses the name "Little Hoyas" for its sports teams and shares the university's blue and gray color scheme.

=== Mascot ===
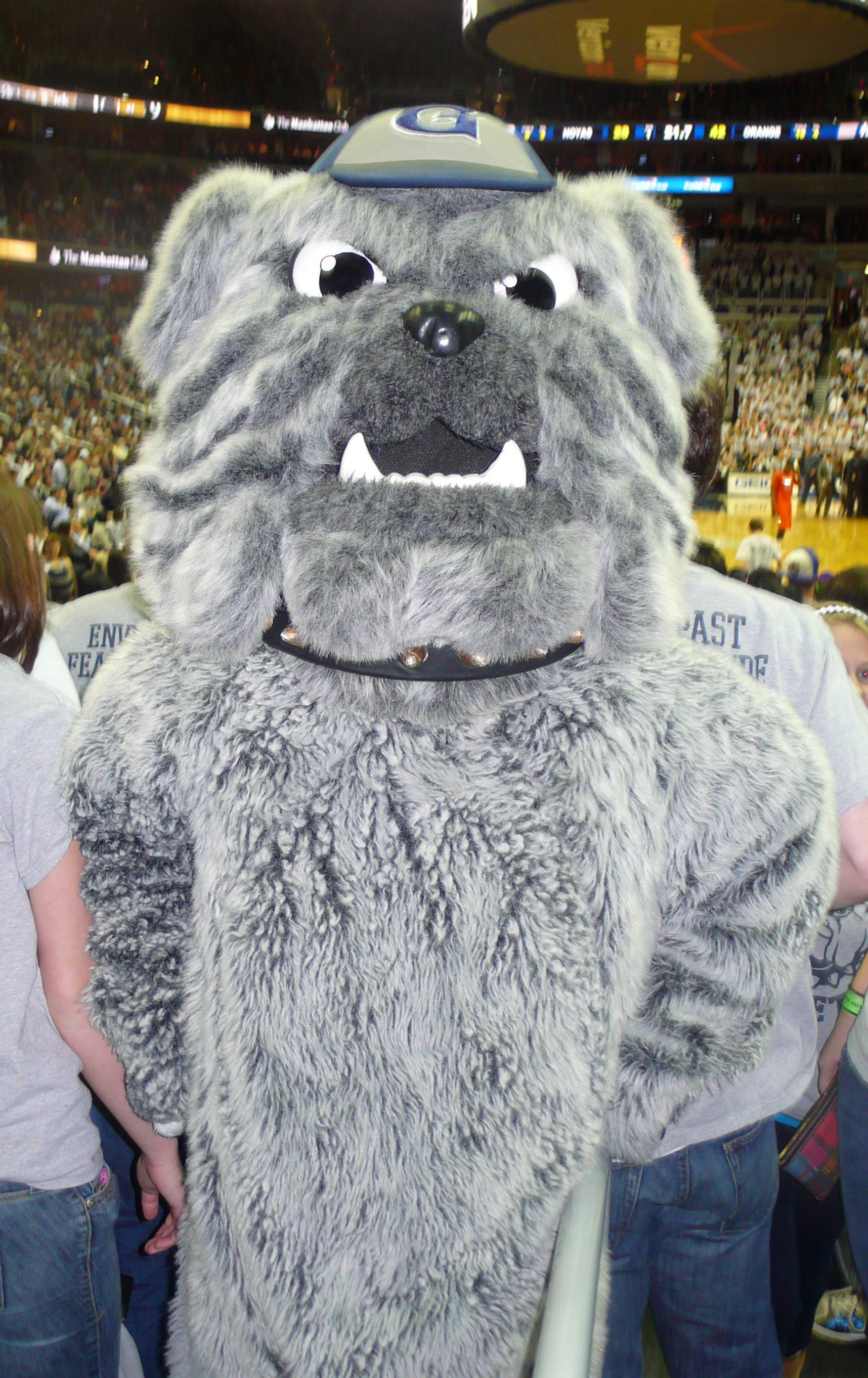
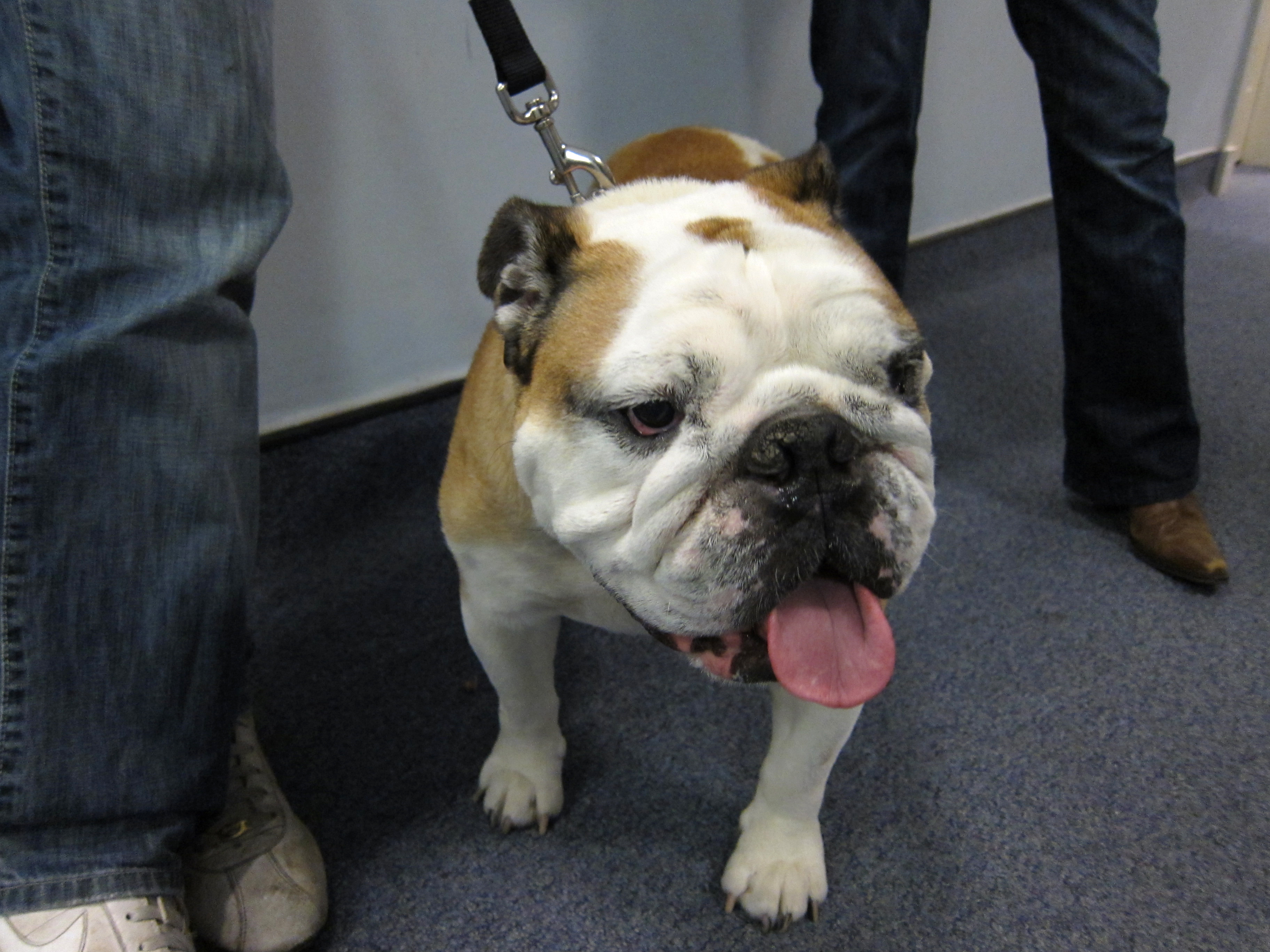
Jack the Bulldog is both a costumed mascot and a live dog.

Georgetown's nickname is The Hoyas, but its mascot is "Jack the Bulldog." Various breeds of dogs have been used by the sports teams as mascots since the early 1900s. Several notable Bull Terriers like Sergeant Stubby and "Hoya" were used at football games in the 1920s, as was a Great Dane in the 1940s. However, in 1951, the school suspended its football program because of the increasing cost of the game financially and academically, which left the school without an official live mascot.

In 1964, the school permitted exhibition football games to resume, and students financed the purchase of a young English Bulldog named Royal Jacket, whom they intended to rename "Hoya", but he only responded to the callname "Jack". This breed was chosen to represent the school because of their "tenacity." The athletics department subsequently adopted as its logo a drawing of a bulldog sporting a blue and gray freshman beanie. The original Jack retired in 1967, but the name was carried over to his successors. In 1977, the university began the tradition of dressing up a student in a blue and gray bulldog costume, replacing the live bulldog, though several dogs periodically joined the costumed mascot during the 1980s and 1990s.

In 1999, Scott R. Pilarz, S.J., with the help of the Hoya Blue fan club, revived the tradition of an official live bulldog named Jack, to work along with the costumed mascot. When Pilarz left for the University of Scranton in 2003, taking Jack with him, Georgetown secured a new bulldog puppy and found another Jesuit, Christopher Steck, S.J., to care for him. The current bulldog is named "John S. Carroll," a play on the name of Georgetown's founder, which name allows for continuation of the "Jack the Bulldog" nickname. After Jack injured his leg in 2012, two Georgetown parents donated a younger bulldog puppy, who the school refers to as "Jack Jr."

=== Colors ===
Blue and gray are the official colors of Georgetown University and its athletic teams. The colors are an important reminder of the school's past. During the American Civil War, Prussian blue was commonly used in Union uniforms, while cadet grey was used in Confederate uniforms. These colors were introduced by the rowing team in 1876, who deemed blue and gray "appropriate colors for the [Boat] Club and expressive of the feeling of unity between the Northern and Southern boys of the College." Girls from neighboring Georgetown Visitation sewed the original uniforms together for the team and presented the Boat Club with a blue and gray banner reading "Ocior Euro" (Swifter than the Wind).

The basketball and lacrosse teams use gray as their primary color in home jerseys, with blue in away jerseys. White is also frequently used as an accent to these colors, and is actually the main color in the football and baseball teams' away jerseys and the soccer team's home jerseys. Campus spirit groups often encourage students to "bleed Hoya blue," a slogan used on teeshirts and bumper stickers sold to fans. Fans are generally encouraged to wear gray to home games, and sellouts are referred to as a "gray out." Though various shades are used, the primary ones suggested by the school's identification policy are pantone 409 and pantone 282, which is the same shade as Oxford Blue.

=== Fight song ===
The Georgetown Fight Song, known as "There Goes Old Georgetown", is actually an amalgamation of three songs, only the oldest of which, 1913's "The Touchdown Song", contains the lyric "here goes old Georgetown". Students combined a version of "The Touchdown Song" with "Cheer for Victory", written in 1915, and "The Hoya Song", written in 1930, both of which are included in their entirety. The authors of these songs, and of the combined version, are unknown.

Georgetown's fight song is rare among U.S. university fight songs for mentioning other colleges by name. Specifically, it mentions Yale University, Harvard University, Princeton University, College of the Holy Cross, the United States Naval Academy, and Cornell University, who were all rivals of Georgetown in the early to mid-20th century, and mocks their fight songs. In recent years the Hoyas only play Cornell and Holy Cross regularly (in football), and many of these schools no longer use the fight songs that Georgetown's song mocks.

== Sports sponsored ==
Men's sports	Women's sports
Baseball	Basketball
Basketball	Heavyweight crew
Heavyweight crew	Lightweight crew
Lightweight crew	Cross country
Cross country	Field hockey
Football	Golf
Golf	Lacrosse
Lacrosse	Soccer
Soccer	Softball
Swimming and diving	Squash
Tennis	Swimming and diving
Track and field^{†}	Tennis
	Track and field^{†}
	Volleyball
Co-ed sports
Sailing
† – Track and field includes both indoor and outdoor.

Georgetown University fields 29 varsity level sports teams; 13 men's teams, 15 women's teams, and one co-ed team. Intercollegiate sports include (inaugural season in parentheses):

- Men's: baseball (1870), basketball (1907), crew (1876; 1958), cross country (1924), football (1887), golf (1925), lacrosse (1951), soccer (1952), swimming and diving (1949), tennis (1920), and track and field (1891)
- Women's: basketball (1960), crew (1975), cross country (1976), field hockey (1960), golf (2001), lacrosse (1975), soccer (1991), softball (2005), squash (2021), swimming and diving (1975), tennis (1960), track and field (1976), and volleyball (1960)
- Coed: sailing (1937)

=== Baseball ===
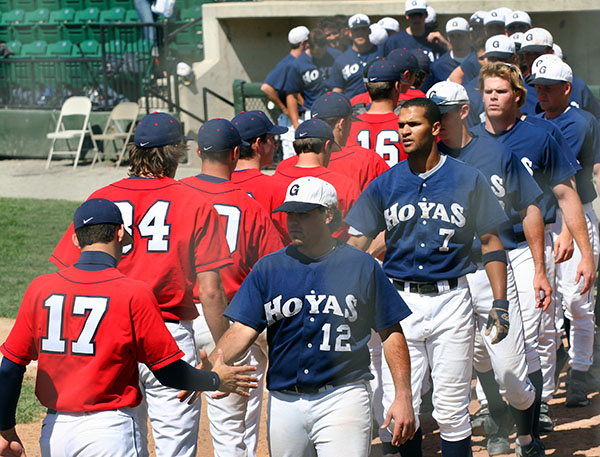
Georgetown's baseball team is the oldest on campus, having been formed in 1870.

Baseball is Georgetown's oldest sport, with the first recorded game taking place in 1866, and the team formally organized and sanctioned in 1870. In 1899, Georgetown took the intercollegiate baseball world by storm, winning 18 of 20 games against college teams, beating national powers Princeton and Yale three times each and Virginia twice. The Hilltoppers reached the pinnacle of college baseball when they were acclaimed intercollegiate national champions at season's end.

Upon their triumphant return from their northern trip at the conclusion of that year, the championship team was escorted from the train station to Georgetown in a torchlight parade led by a carriage of top university officials and included students on horseback, alumni, students from the three schools, and the college band. They were greeted with fireworks once back on campus. The Hoyas have no appearances in the NCAA Division I Baseball Championship since the event was established in 1947. The team was once known as the Stonewalls, and is one possible source of the Hoya Saxa cheer famous among all Georgetown sports teams. The Hoyas play their home games at Capital One Park, a 650-seat stadium located in Tysons, Virginia.

=== Basketball ===
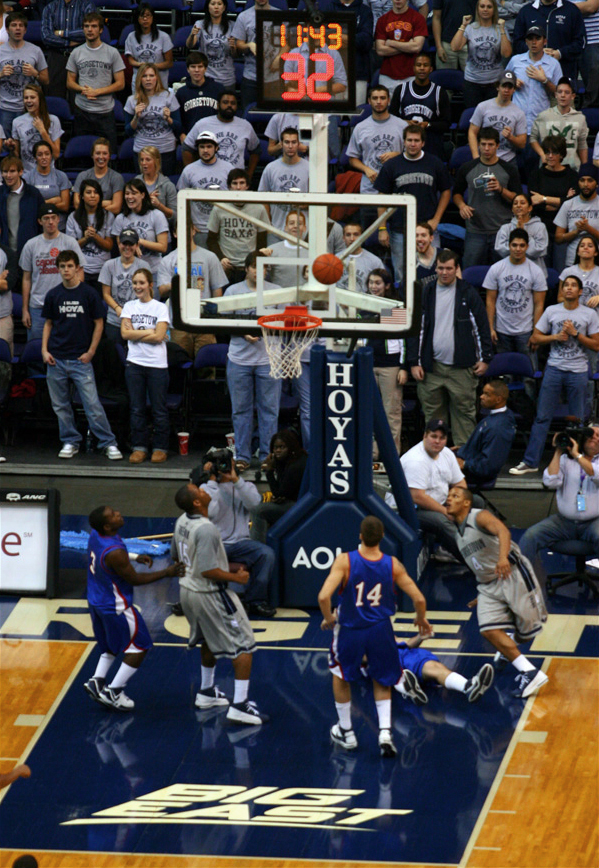
The men's basketball teams plays their home games at the Capital One Arena in downtown Washington, D.C.

The Georgetown University men's basketball team is the most well-known Hoya program. Georgetown's first intercollegiate men's basketball team was formed in 1907. 2022 Naismith Coach of the Year Ed Cooley is the team's current head coach. The Hoyas historically have been well regarded not only for their team success, but also for their ability to generate players that after graduation succeed both on the court, such as Patrick Ewing, and off, such as Paul Tagliabue and Henry Hyde. The team has reached the NCAA Tournament Final Four five times including the 1984 national championship, and has won the Big East tournament eight times, and has also won or shared the Big East regular season title ten times.

The women's basketball also plays in the Big East Conference, and are coached by James Howard. The team was first formed in 1970, and joined the Big East in 1983. They play their home games on campus at McDonough Gymnasium. The women's team so far has not seen the same success as the men's, and have only been invited to the NCAA tournament three times, reaching the Sweet Sixteen in 1993 and 2011, and the second round in 2010. They have been invited to the Women's National Invitation Tournament, five times, progressing furthest in 2009 by reaching the fourth round.

=== Football ===
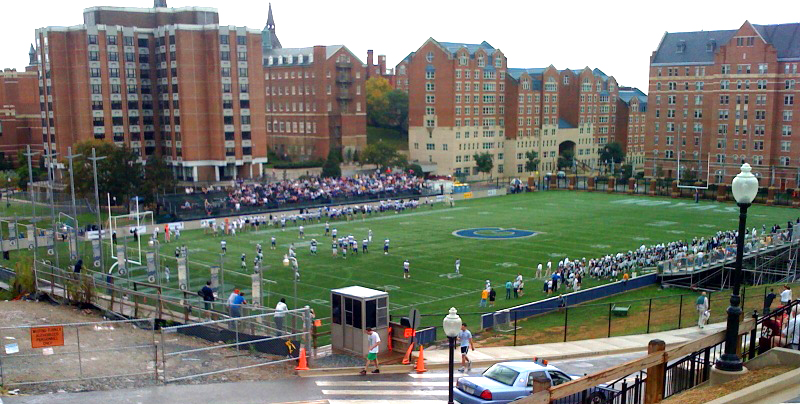
Georgetown football plays its home games on Cooper Field on their main campus

The football team at Georgetown was first formed on November 1, 1874, with the earliest recorded games dating to 1887. By the 1940s, Georgetown had one of the better college football teams in America, and played in the 1941 Orange Bowl, where they lost 14–7 to Mississippi State. As the college game became more expensive after World War II, however, Georgetown's program began to lose money rapidly. The Hoyas last successful season was 1949, when they lost in the Sun Bowl against Texas Western. However the program was losing too much money, and on March 22, 1951, the university's president canceled the football program.

In 1964, Georgetown allowed its students to start a football program as an exhibition-only club sport. Varsity football resumed in 1970 at what later became known as the Division III level. Today, Georgetown plays at the Division I Football Championship Subdivision, competing in the Patriot League and perennially plays against Ivy League schools. The Hoyas have also begun a cross-town rivalry with Howard University for a championship known as the D.C. Cup.

"Big Jim" Ricca, an NFL defensive end and offensive lineman, graduated in 1949 and was the last Hoya to play in an NFL game. In 2007, the Washington Redskins made Alex Buzbee a reserve player, becoming the first Georgetown player on an NFL team since Ricca retired in 1956. The 2011 Georgetown Football team finished 8–3, which was their first winning season since the 1999 campaign, giving them a second place in the conference.

=== Golf ===
The men's golf team has won four Big East Conference championships: 1998, 2010, 2016, and 2018. The women's golf team has won two Big East Conference championships: 2017 and 2018. They are coached by Tommy Hunter, who was named Big East Coach of the Year in 2010. They have crowned two national champions: Maurice McCarthy Jr. in 1928 and John Burke in 1938.

=== Lacrosse ===
Both the men's and women's lacrosse teams have been highly competitive in recent years, both in conference and tournament play. A men's lacrosse team was first organized in 1951, and entered Division 1 play in 1970. The team played in the Eastern College Athletic Conference until the 2010 season, when the Big East Conference created a men's league. The men's team made the NCAA Tournament each season from 1996 to 2007, reaching the Final Four in 1999.

The women's lacrosse team was formed in 1977, and won the first 6 consecutive Big East titles from 2001 to 2006. The Lady Hoyas reached the NCAA Women's Lacrosse Championship final in both 2001 and 2002. In 2005, their first season under new coach Ricky Fried, the team went 13–5 and made the NCAA Tournament for the 8th straight year. Both the men's and women's teams play their home games on Multi-Sport Field.

=== Rowing ===
Rowing at Georgetown has a distinguished history dating back to the founding of the Boat Club in 1876. The team was however suspended from 1909 to 1920 due to lack of interest, and involvement in World War I. Georgetown added a men's lightweight team in 1963, a women's team in 1975, and a women's lightweight team in 1996.

The men have won 8 national championships at the Intercollegiate Rowing Association Regatta, the most recent being the men's varsity lightweight fours with coxswain on June 1, 2025. The first national championship win was in 1991 with the varsity heavyweight fours with coxswain.

The rowing blade features blue and gray, the team's colors since 1876.

Under the guidance of Head Coaches Jim Granger, Kendall Mulligan, Ethan Shoemaker, Abbey Wilkowski, and Coach Emeritus Tony Johnson, Georgetown competes as a member of the top leagues in American rowing, the Eastern Association of Rowing Colleges and Eastern Association of Women's Rowing Colleges. Georgetown's four crew teams have seen success in recent years, including trips to the Henley Royal Regatta and entry into the Eastern Sprints for the men's heavyweight and lightweight teams and second-in-the-nation finishes for both men's and women's lightweight teams. Many Georgetown oarsmen and -women have gone on to represent the United States on national and Olympic teams. The lightweight women's team has earned bronze medals at Women's Eastern Sprints in the Lightweight Women's Varsity 8+ in 2013 and the Lightweight Women's Varsity 4+ in 2015. The LW8+ crew earning bronze in 2013 was later named Row2k Crew of the Week.

The university rents space in Thompson Boat Center, though it has ongoing plans to build a new boathouse closer to campus. For land workouts, Georgetown rowers have an erg room in the Thompson Athletic Center. Notable Georgetown crew alumni include walk-on Mike Vespoli, the founder and chief executive officer of Vespoli USA, Inc.; U.S. team athletes Mike Altman, Kelley Jones and Jack Carlson; and actor Bradley Cooper.

=== Sailing ===
The sailing team competes in the Middle Atlantic Intercollegiate Sailing Association (MAISA) of the Inter-Collegiate Sailing Association (ICSA). Under coach Mike Callahan has been ranked number 1 nationally in the ICSA Sailing World College Rankings on multiple occasions. The team sails from the Washington Sailing Marina Andrew Campbell was named U.S. Olympic Committee (USOC) Male Sailing Athlete of the Year in 2002 and 2005, and ICSA College Sailor of the Year in 2006. He is one of the six team members awarded as College Sailors of the Year on seven occasions, as Nevin Snow has taken the prize twice, in 2015 and 2016. Campbell helped lead the team to the first of their 14 Inter-Collegiate Sailing Association National Championships since 2001, and are the reigning national co-ed champions as of 2016. During this time the team also won seven MAISA conference championships, known as the America Trophy. After the team's 2013 national championship, they were invited to participate in the 2014 World University Match Racing Championships in Trentino, Italy, on Lago di Ledro, which they won 7–1, besting nineteen teams from fourteen countries. The Hoyas won the Leonard M. Fowle Trophy to the best overall collegiate team in 2006.

=== Soccer ===
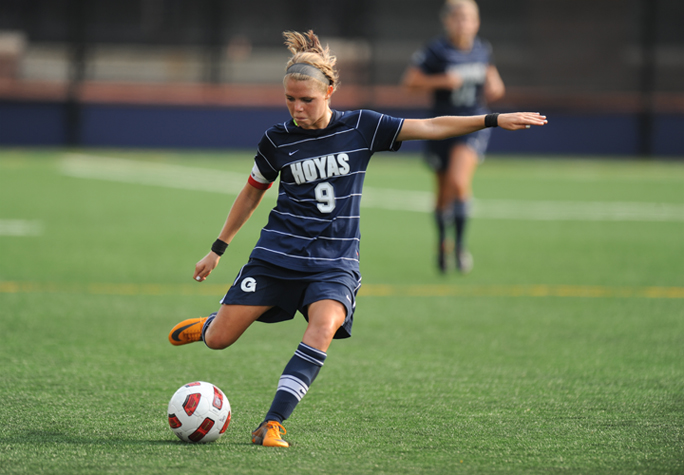
Ingrid Wells helped the women's team reach the 2010 NCAA College Cup quarter finals

The men's soccer team was organized in 1952, and won a national championship in 2019. That year was their second national title game, having been runners up in 2012, with nine total NCAA Tournament appearances. They play in the Big East Conference, and have won the conference tournament four times and the regular season seven times. They are coached by Brian Wiese, and play their home games on campus at North Kehoe Field. The women's soccer team began play in 1991, have been coached by Dave Nolan since 1999, and share the same home field. The women's team has been to the NCAA Tournament twice, in 2007 and 2010, when they advanced to the quarterfinals.

Six players from the men's soccer team have played professionally for Major League Soccer: Phil Wellington (drafted in 1996), Brandon Leib (1997), Eric Kvello (1999), Dan Gargan 2004 (Selected 43rd overall in the 2005 MLS Supplemental Draft), Jeff Curtin 2005 (1st round draft Pick #14 overall), and Steve Neumann 2014 (1st round draft pick in 2014 MLS SuperDraft, 4th overall pick). Ricky Schramm, who played on the 2006 Hoyas, was drafted in the 3rd round by D.C. United. Women's team star Ingrid Wells has played on the United States U-23 women's national soccer team and for Göteborg FC.

=== Tennis ===
Georgetown University has both men's and women's varsity tennis teams. In March 2019 federal prosecutors indicted Gordon Ernst, the former Georgetown head coach of the men's and women's teams from 2006 until 2017, for accepting more than $2.7 million in bribes from parents to secure their children's Georgetown admission by allegedly falsely designating at least 12 applicants, including those who did not play tennis competitively, as recruits for the Georgetown tennis team as part of the 2019 college admissions bribery scandal. Ernst was charged with racketeering conspiracy and ordered to forfeit $2.7 million, a home in Chevy Chase, Maryland, his Chevy Chase country club membership, and a financial account. Ernst later accepted a lower paying, lower profile coaching job at the University of Rhode Island, where he was placed on administrative leave after he was charged and arrested for the Georgetown allegations. On September 15, 2021, Ernst, who once coached former U.S. First Lady Michelle Obama, agreed to plead guilty.

=== Track and field ===
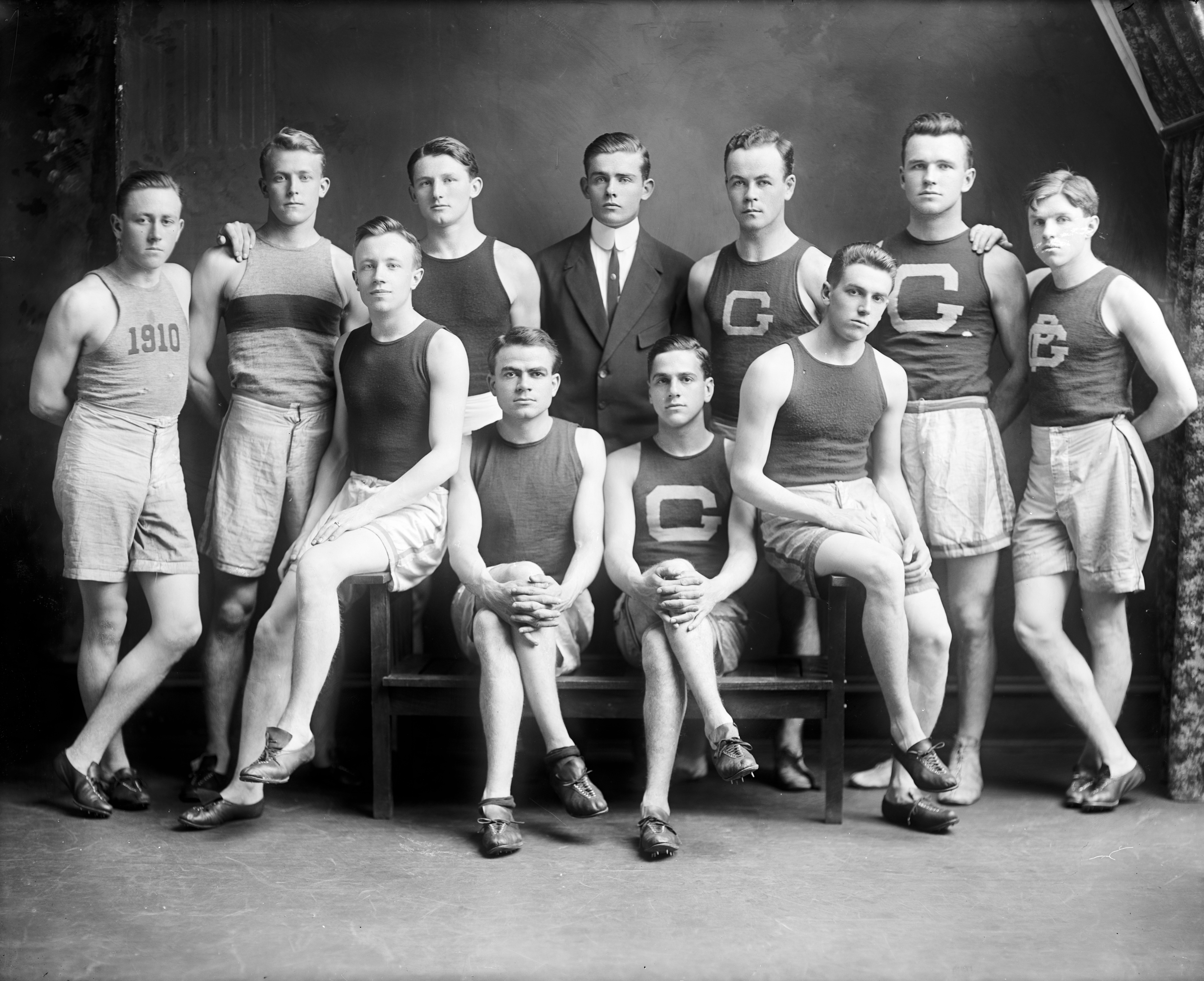
The 1910 Georgetown varsity track team

Georgetown has been nationally successful in both cross country and track and field. The men and women's track and field teams practice off-campus at Duke Ellington Track in neighboring Burleith. The men's and women's teams have both been ranked #1 by the U.S. Track & Field and Cross Country Coaches Association in recent years, both nationally and in the Mid-Atlantic Region. In 2011, the women's cross country program won the NCAA Championship by besting Big East rival Villanova. Chris Miltenberg, women's cross country coach, won the 2011 NCAA coach of the year for women's cross country. Patrick Henner is the director of men's and women's track and field as of 2012. Georgetown track and field has won 21 individual NCAA National Championships, being 15 by male athletes and 6 by female athletes. The first individual NCAA National Champion was Charles Capozzoli in cross country in 1952. To date, there have also been 11 National Champions in indoor and 9 National Champions in outdoor NCAA track and field championships.

== NCAA team championships ==
Georgetown has won 3 NCAA Division I team national championships.

- Men's (2)
  - Basketball (1): 1984
  - Soccer (1): 2019
- Women's (1)
  - Cross Country (1): 2011
- see also:
  - Big East Conference NCAA team championships
  - List of NCAA schools with the most NCAA Division I championships

== NCAA individual championships ==
Georgetown has won 23 NCAA Division I individual national championships:

- Golf – Men – 2 NCAA national championships – Maurice McCarthy Jr. (1928) and John Burke (1938)
- Cross Country – Men – 1 NCAA national championship – Charles Capozzoli (1952)
- Track and Field – Outdoor – Men – 8 NCAA national championships
- Track and Field – Outdoor – Women – 1 NCAA national championship
- Track and Field – Indoor – Men – 6 NCAA national championships
- Track and Field – Indoor – Women – 5 NCAA national championships

Georgetown has also won 1 NCAA Division 2 individual national championship:

- Tennis – Women – 1 NCAA national championship – Suzanne Kuhlman (1983)

== Club teams ==
Georgetown University fields numerous club sports teams. They range from club versions of varsity sports, such as tennis or basketball, to sports for which there is no varsity equivalent, such as men and women's Water Polo Clubs or Ultimate Frisbee. The university began supporting club teams in 2000. Though other teams exist, such as the Georgetown University Croquet Society, the Club Sports Board at Georgetown supports eleven men's club teams, ten women's, and three co-ed teams (year founded in parentheses):

- Men's: boxing (2008), cycling, ice hockey, basketball, lacrosse (1995), rugby (1967), soccer, ultimate frisbee, volleyball, water polo (1993), triathlon (2005)
- Women's: squash (2008), water polo, basketball, field hockey, lacrosse, rugby (2000), soccer (2001), ultimate frisbee, volleyball, boxing
- Co-ed: equestrian, racquetball (2007), tennis (2004), climbing (2010)

=== Boxing ===
The men's and women's boxing teams compete as part of the United States Intercollegiate Boxing Association. The women's boxing team won the 2019 USIBA national championship.

=== Rugby ===
The Georgetown University Rugby Football Club is the intercollegiate men's rugby union team that represents Georgetown in the USA Rugby Division II competition. It was founded in the spring semester of 1967 by former members of the Washington, D.C., Rugby Football Club, including graduate student Michael Murphy. In 2005, Georgetown's first reached the Final Four of the USA Rugby Collegiate Division II National Tournament. The "Hoya Ruggers" again reached for the semifinals in 2009 in Palo Alto, California, and have had an undefeated 2009–10 season.

A women's rugby team was founded in 2000, and plays in Division II in the Potomac Rugby Union (PRU). They have won the PRU championship four consecutive times from 2006 to 2009. They have also been invited to the Mid-Atlantic Rugby Football Union tournament three times, and were runners-up in 2006–07.

=== Ice hockey ===
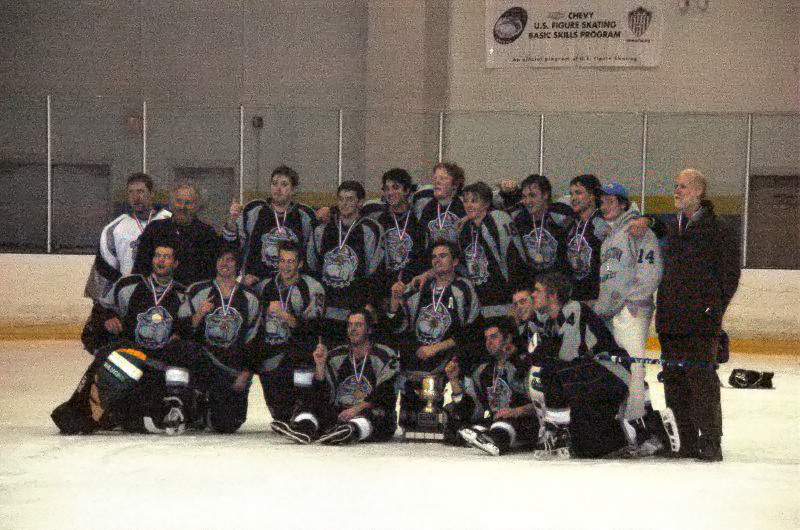
The Georgetown ice hockey club team has won the ACCHL championship four times.

Georgetown's ice hockey team plays in the ACHA Division II in the Atlantic Coast Collegiate Hockey League (ACCHL) as one of three teams whose primary conference is not the Atlantic Coast Conference. Since joining this conference in 2003, the team has won the conference championship four times, in 2004–05, 2006–07, 2007–08, and again in 2012–13. The team previously played in the Division III Mason-Dixon Collegiate Hockey Association, where it won the league championship in 1997, 1999, and 2000. In 2001 and 2002, they were invited to the national tournament of the American Collegiate Hockey Association, which the team had joined in 1999. Coach Brad Card now leads the team, taking over the bench for Coach John Kokidko. The team plays its home matches at the Washington Capitals' practice arena, Kettler Capitals Iceplex in Ballston, Virginia, at the Ballston Common Mall.

== Athletic directors ==
After Bernard Muir left the position as the director of the Athletic Department on May 11, 2009, a yearlong search for a replacement began. Dr. Daniel R. Porterfield, senior vice president for strategic development, served as interim director of athletics beginning June 3, 2009, until Lee Reed took the position on April 15, 2010.

Name	Years
Charles R. Cox	1914–1920
Vincent S. McDonough	1920–1924
Lou Little	1924–1930
H. Gabriel Murphy	1930–1941
Rome F. Schwagel	1941–1942
Joseph T. Gardner	1942–1943
John J. Kehoe	1943–1944
Jack Hagerty	1946–1947
Rome F. Schwagel	1947–1949
Jack Hagerty	1949–1969
Robert H. Sigholtz	1969–1972
Francis X. Rienzo	1972–1994
Joseph C. Lang	1994–2004
Adam Brick	2004–2005
Bernard Muir	2005–2009
Daniel R. Porterfield	2009–2010
Lee Reed	2010–present

== In popular culture ==
With the rise of Georgetown's men's basketball team in the 1980s, the Hoyas became increasingly associated with the Black community in the United States and in the Washington, D.C., area in particular. Consequently, Georgetown came to be referenced in work by African-American artists, including Spike Lee's She's Gotta Have It, Outkast's Aquemini and Jay-Z's Kingdom Come.
