= There Goes Old Georgetown =

Georgetown University fight song

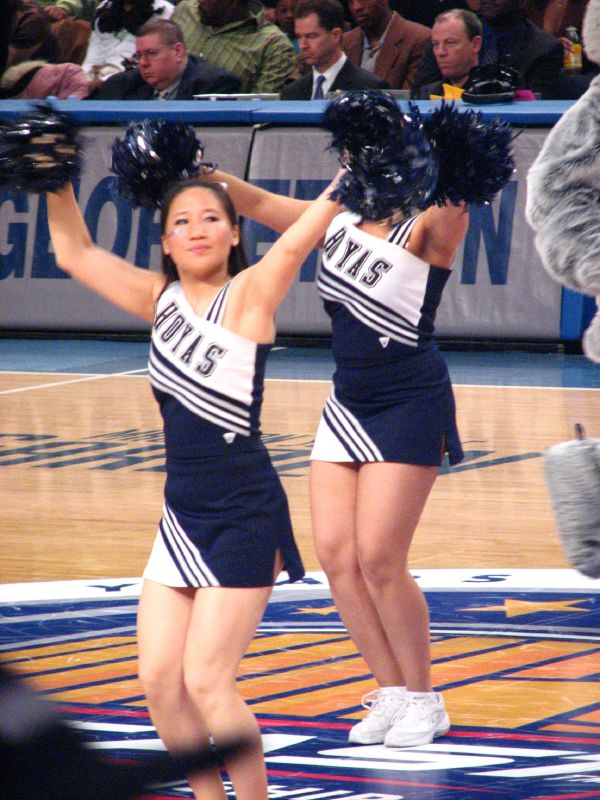
Hoya cheerleaders at an NCAA basketball game

"There Goes Old Georgetown" (Listen) is the unofficial name of the Georgetown University sports teams' fight song. It is also known as simply "Georgetown Fight Song". It is actually an amalgamation of three songs, only the oldest of which, 1913's "The Touchdown Song", contains the lyric "here goes old Georgetown". Onto a version of this was added "Cheer for Victory", written in 1915, and "The Hoya Song", written in 1930, both of which are included in their entirety. The authors of these songs, and of the combined version, are unknown. Although some effort has been taken to change the song, no serious proposal has come forth.

== Music ==
Georgetown's fight song is rare among U.S. university fight songs for mentioning other colleges by name, generally rivals of Georgetown in the early to mid-20th century. Specifically, it mentions Yale University, Harvard University, Princeton University, College of the Holy Cross, the United States Naval Academy, and Cornell University, and mocks their fight songs. In the late 20th and early 21st century, the Hoyas only played Cornell and Holy Cross regularly in football, and many of these schools no longer used the fight songs that Georgetown's song mocks. By 2015, rowing was the only sport in which Georgetown athletes competed against all colleges named in the fight song. The song lacks references to Big East Conference rivals, such as Villanova.

During men's and women's basketball games, the line "Straight for a touchdown" is typically changed to "Straight for a rebound," which allows the rhyme to continue. In some editions, both the football and basketball versions are sung back to back, while others repeat the first two verses. The final verse is usually followed by a call and response of the school cheer, "Hoya Saxa." Anyone can start the Georgetown fight song by asking a large group of Hoyas, "How long's it been?" The group will reply with the fight song. With a properly motivated Hoya crowd, starting and holding the long low base note of "It's…" will also work.

== Usage ==
The song is typically performed at athletics events by the Georgetown University Pep Band, but is also used at other large university occasions. Campus music groups such as The Georgetown Chimes use the song regularly in their performances. In 2006, Georgetown students produced a film, Georgetown Forever, which brings to life different elements of the fight song. The fight song has also been parodied by campus groups such as the Georgetown Solidarity Committee. Though freshmen often memorize the lyrics as part their first week's activities, the song is notoriously difficult to learn, and accurate performance of the fight song is required for membership in certain spirit groups, such as Hoya Blue and the Jack Crew.

== See also ==
- Hoya Saxa
- Georgetown University Alma Mater

== Bibliography ==
- Malliet, Christina; Richmond, Derek; Wilson, Andrew (2011). Georgetown University 2012: Off the Record. Pittsburgh: College Prowler. ISBN 978-1-4274-0435-0.
- Stewart, Mark; Zeysing, Matt (2010). The Georgetown Hoyas. Chicago: Norwood House Press. ISBN 978-1-59953-364-3.
- Studwell, William Emmett; Schueneman, Bruce R. (1998). College Fight Songs. Binghamton, NY: Haworth Press. ISBN 0-7890-0665-0.
