= Steven Dean Memorial Trophy =

- Catholic University Cardinals Georgetown Hoyas
- Sport: Football
- First meeting: September 25, 1976; 49 years ago Catholic University 41, Georgetown 35
- Latest meeting: September 14, 2019; 6 years ago Georgetown 69, Catholic University 0
- Stadiums: Brookland Stadium; GU Baseball Field; Kehoe Field; Cardinal Stadium; Cooper Field
- Trophy: Steven Dean Memorial Trophy

Statistics
- Total meetings: 19
- All-time series: Georgetown leads 10–9 (.526) (Note: The result of the 1984 game is disputed.)
- Largest victory: Georgetown 69–0 (2019)
- Longest win streak: Georgetown, 4 (1985–1988, 1991–present)
- Current win streak: Georgetown, 4 (1991–present)

The Steven Dean Memorial Trophy is a college football trophy that goes to the winner of the Catholic University of America and Georgetown University football game. The trophy was introduced in 1976 and is named after former Georgetown University team manager and Catholic University sports information director Steven Dean, who died of cerebral palsy. It was considered the "City Championship".

Catholic and Georgetown had already met for 8 seasons (1966, 1967, 1968, 1969, 1970, 1971, 1973 and 1974) before the trophy introduction, and the rivalry was becoming the nation's capital own Holy War.

Catholic won the first trophy game 41–35 at Brookland Stadium and went on to win 9. Georgetown won in 1978 for the first time, and won the trophy ten times, leaving the series 10–9.

After three straight Georgetown wins, the last game of the annual series was played in 1993, with Georgetown moving to Division I and Catholic still competing in Division III. The rivalry was renewed with a meeting in 2019, won 69–0 by Georgetown.

== Game results ==
Catholic University victories	Georgetown victories	Tie games

No.	Date	Location	Winner	Score
1	September 25, 1976	Washington, D.C.	Catholic University	45–35
2	September 24, 1977 (Note: This was the second year in a row that the game was decided in the final 90 seconds.)	Washington, D.C.	Catholic University	27–22
3	September 23, 1978	Washington, D.C.	Georgetown	28–19
4	November 3, 1979	Washington, D.C.	Catholic University	13–6
5	November 1, 1980	Washington, D.C.	Catholic University	33–8
6	October 31, 1981	Washington, D.C.	Georgetown	6–0
7	October 30, 1982	Washington, D.C.	Catholic University	19–18
8	October 29, 1983	Washington, D.C.	Catholic University	40–23
9	October 27, 1984	Washington, D.C.	Catholic University	56–6
10	November 2, 1985	Washington, D.C.	Georgetown	24–10

No.	Date	Location	Winner	Score
11	November 1, 1986	Washington, D.C.	Georgetown	16–14
12	October 31, 1987	Washington, D.C.	Georgetown	35–14
13	October 29, 1988	Washington, D.C.	Georgetown	18–13
14	October 28, 1989	Washington, D.C.	Catholic University	21–3
15	October 27, 1990	Washington, D.C.	Catholic University	26–9
16	November 2, 1991	Washington, D.C.	Georgetown	21–17
17	October 31, 1992	Washington, D.C.	Georgetown	19–16
18	October 30, 1993	Washington, D.C.	Georgetown	10–0
19	September 14, 2019	Washington, D.C.	Georgetown	69–0
Series: Georgetown leads 10–9
