= Alex Buzbee =

American gridiron football player (born 1985)

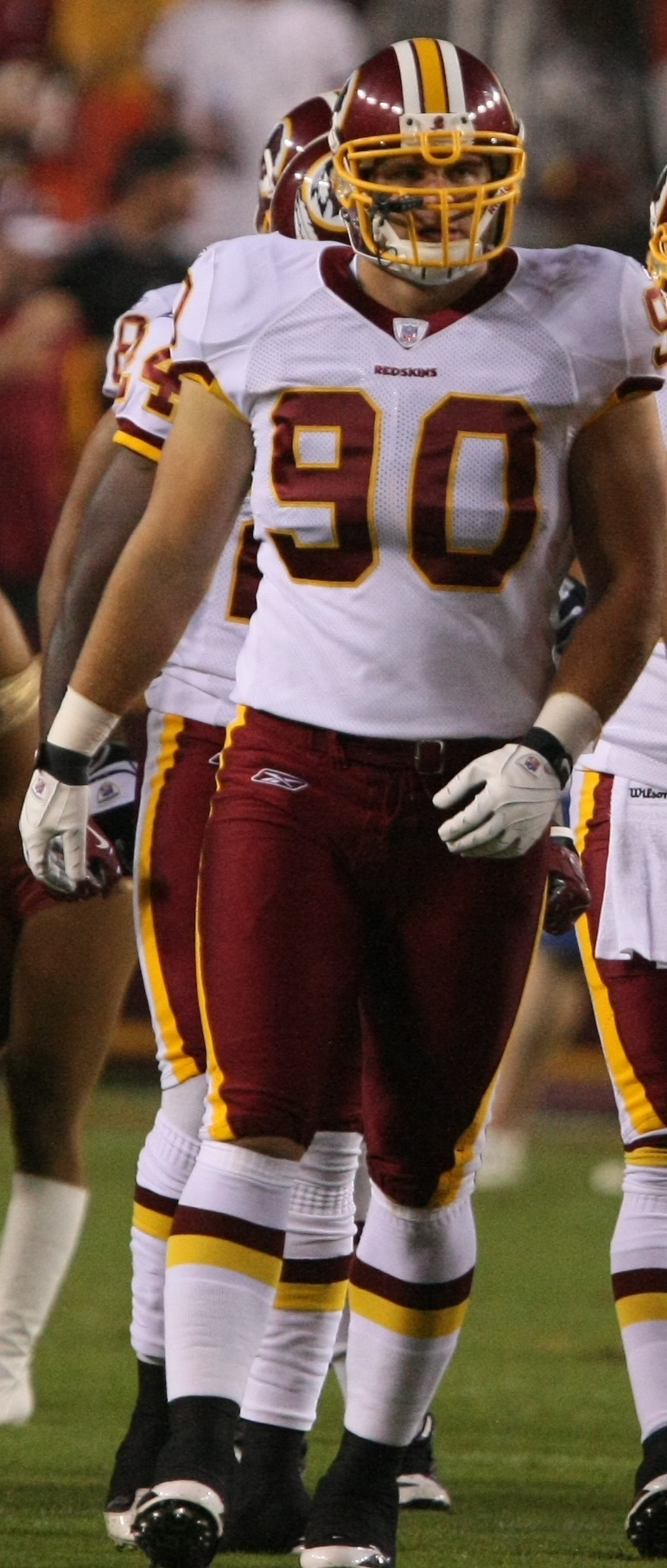
- Buzbee in 2009 with the Washington Redskins

No. 90, 96
- Position: Defensive end

Personal information
- Born: November 27, 1985 (age 40); Memphis, Tennessee, U.S.
- Listed height: 6 ft 3 in (1.91 m)
- Listed weight: 265 lb (120 kg)

Career information
- High school: West Orange (NJ) Seton Hall
- College: Georgetown
- NFL draft: 2007: undrafted

Career history
- Washington Redskins (2007–2008); Toronto Argonauts (2010–2011)

Awards and highlights
- First-team All-Patriot League (2006); 2× Second-team All-Patriot League (2004, 2005)

Career CFL statistics
- Total tackles: 55
- Sacks: 9
- Interceptions: 1

Alex Franklin Buzbee (born November 27, 1985) is an American former professional football defensive end. He played for the Washington Redskins of the National Football League (NFL) and Toronto Argonauts of the Canadian Football League (CFL). He was signed by the Redskins as an undrafted free agent in 2007. He played college football at Georgetown.

== Early life ==
Buzbee played for Seton Hall Prep in West Orange, New Jersey.

== College career ==
Buzbee was as a four-year starter at Georgetown where he totaled 27.5 career sacks, which ranks second all-time at Georgetown. He was First-team All-Patriot League as a senior and Honorable mention All- America selection by the Don Hansen Football Gazette. As a senior in 2006 he had 75 tackles (30 solo), 13 tackles for loss, and one forced fumble and led the Patriot League with 5.5 sacks. In 2006, he was Second-team All-Patriot League after starting all 11 games and making 44 tackles (29 solo), 12.5 tackles for loss, 6.5 sacks and two forced fumbles. In 2004, he Second-team All-Patriot League as he tied for the league and team in lead in sacks with 10.5 and finished the year with 12.5 tackles for loss, and totaled 39 tackles forced two fumbles on the season. In 2003, he played 11 games, made 28 tackles, including 7.5 for a loss and had five sacks.

== Professional career ==
For more than 50 years, former Redskin Jim Ricca was the last Georgetown University graduate to play in the NFL. The promotion of Buzbee from the Washington Redskins practice squad to the active roster on December 19, 2007, ended the 51-year drought of Hoyas in the league. Ricca played for Georgetown from 1947 to 1949.

In his first year with the Redskins, Buzbee did not play in any games although he was listed as active for three. During the 2008 training camp, Buzbee ruptured his Achilles' tendon and missed the entire season. His injury, along with the season-ending injury of fellow defensive end Phillip Daniels, prompted the Redskins to trade for Jason Taylor of the Miami Dolphins.

Buzbee was released from the team on September 5, 2009, on cut day.

On February 22, 2010, Buzbee signed with the Toronto Argonauts of the Canadian Football League.
