= Jack the Bulldog =

Mascot of Georgetown University

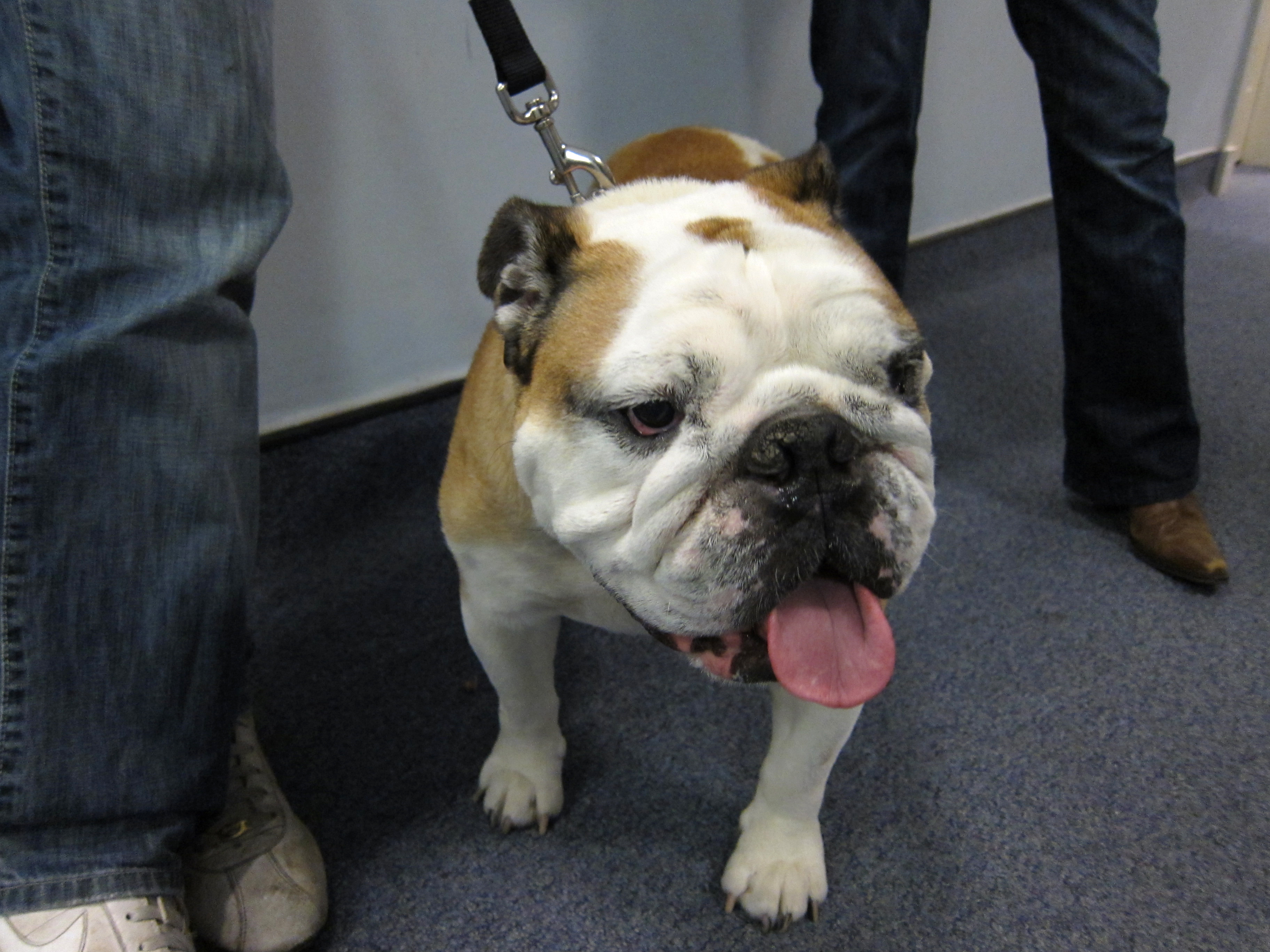
- Jack (John S. Carroll) visiting students
- University: Georgetown University
- Conference: Big East
- Description: English bulldog
- Origin of name: Lil-Nan's Royal Jacket
- First seen: 1962

Jack the Bulldog is the official mascot of the Georgetown University Hoyas athletic teams. The school has employed at least nine live Bulldogs as mascots, and counts seven named Jack since 1962, when the name first came into use, including three who are still living. The current incarnation of Jack, who will be taking over from his predecessor during the spring 2024 semester, is an English Bulldog born in 2023 whose full name is Serchell's John P. Carroll. Recent bulldogs have come from the Georgetown alumni family of Janice and Marcus Hochstetler.

Jack was not always the name of the Georgetown Hoyas' mascot, nor was the mascot always a bulldog, as other types of dogs, particularly bull terriers, were associated with the sports teams before 1962. In 2009, the American Kennel Club ranked Jack as the 8th most popular dog in American culture. Today, Georgetown is among thirty-nine American universities to use a bulldog as their mascot, with Georgia, Butler, Mississippi State, Yale, and James Madison being the only others with a live bulldog. Jack is also portrayed by a costumed character Bulldog mascot, a tradition dating to 1977. In 2019, a campus editorial called for replacing the bulldog with a rescue dog, in part because of the health problems and short lifespans that many bulldogs face.

== Early dogs ==
Dogs have been associated with the school's sports teams on an unofficial basis since the late nineteenth century. Early dog mascots may have included a mutt called Hoya around 1900, a Borzoi named Richmond Jack in 1906, a bulldog named Hoya in 1907, and a Boston Bull Terrier in 1911. At that time, most mascots were primarily associated with the school's football team, and were cared for by students or individual sports teams, rather than the administration.

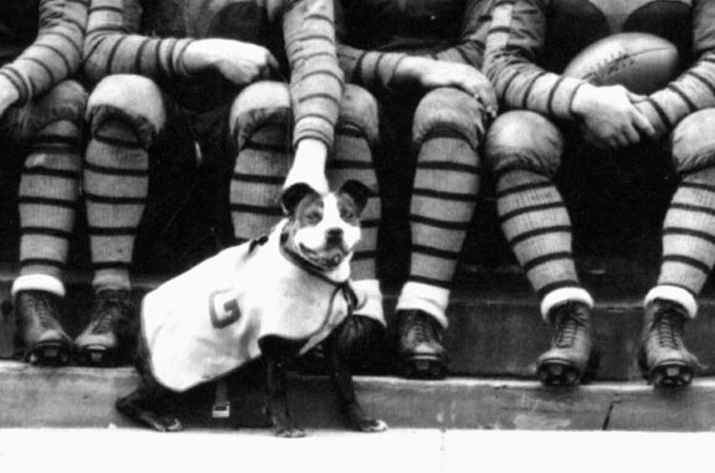
"Hoya" began as mascot in 1926

Sergeant Stubby, a part bull terrier and a decorated World War I war dog, came to campus in 1921 with J. Robert Conroy who was attending Georgetown Law at the time. The school football team used Stubby as a popular halftime show where he would push a football across the field, which established him as a campus celebrity. After Stubby died in 1926, the team then chose a female bull terrier named Jazz Bo, who had been brought to campus by Georgetown College student Paul Van Laanen. Jazz Bo was retitled "Hoya" by the students, after the traditional "Hoya Saxa" school cheer. The athletic teams are possibly named, in turn, for this dog. When "Hoya" gave birth to a daughter, students named the puppy "Saxa".

Other bull terriers like Saxa filled in as mascot until World War II, when athletics at the school paused during the war. After the war, a series of Great Danes, named Bo, Butch, and Hobo, served as mascot. William Peter Blatty, author of The Exorcist, was one of the students to care for Butch. During this time period mascot abductions by rival schools became a common threat to the animal's safety. A bull terrier costume was also briefly used by the school, but in 1951, the school suspended the football program as part of a larger backlash against university sports. This left the school without a mascot.

== Royal Jacket ==
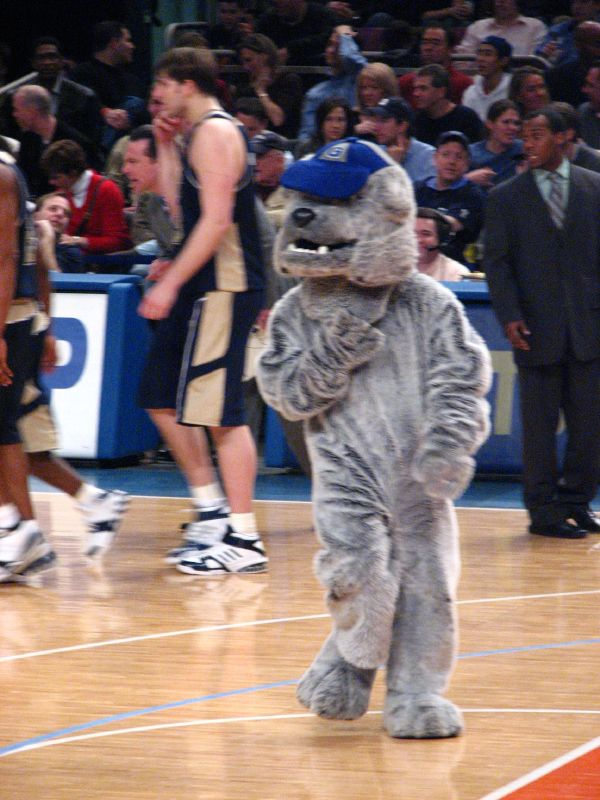
The costumed personification of Jack the Bulldog at a basketball game.

In 1962, with the resumption of football, students Stan Samorajczyk and John Feldmann, editors of The Hoya campus newspaper, founded a committee to raise money for the purchase of a new mascot dog in time for the first new games in 1964. This committee chose a purebred English Bulldog as the dog which would represent Georgetown students because of their "tenacity." Samorajczyk also followed the sports team jerseys, which may have previously had an image of a bulldog on them. Around this time the school also adopted as the official logo of the athletics program a new drawing in blue and gray school colors of the bulldog. This logo dog wears a cap typical of the beanie which other freshman at the time had to wear.

For $150 the committee bought a two-year-old blue-ribbon-champion show dog named "Lil-Nan's Royal Jacket," named because the colors of his coat looked like a jacket. This dog was to be renamed "Hoya" like his 1926 predecessor, but refused to respond to any name other than his call name "Jack." Jack lived outside New South Hall in a heated doghouse. In 1967, Royal Jacket retired and was replaced by a second bulldog who continued under the simple name "Jack." In 1977, as the basketball program gained popularity, the costumed mascot took over duties as Jack. The costume, first worn by student Pat Sheehan, has been updated numerous times, most recently in 2013. Other live bulldogs owned by students at times joined the costumed Jack, including one named Rocky from 1982 to 1985 and one named Daisy in 1997.

== John P. Carroll ==
In 1998, Michael Boyle, Austin Martin, and Kathleen Long, co-founders of the Hoya Blue fan club began a campaign to revive the tradition of an official live mascot with the assistance of English professor Father Scott R. Pilarz, S.J. The "Bring Back Jack" Campaign initially sought to find a suitable dog among the students and faculty, as the university did not want to use school funds for the purchase. Ultimately, Hoya Blue raised $1,500 to purchase a new puppy named Jack (officially, John P. Carroll) and placed him in the care of Father Pilarz on February 16, 1999. However, after four years, Jack left Georgetown with Pilarz, who was named president of the University of Scranton in Pennsylvania in 2003, and then president of Marquette University in 2011. John P. Carroll died on September 16, 2011, at the home of Pilarz's parents in Voorhees Township, New Jersey, at the age of 12.

Donations from Hoya Blue, the Hoya Hoop Club, the Office of the President, and alumni allowed for the purchase of the third incarnation of Jack (born 2003).

== John S. Carroll ==
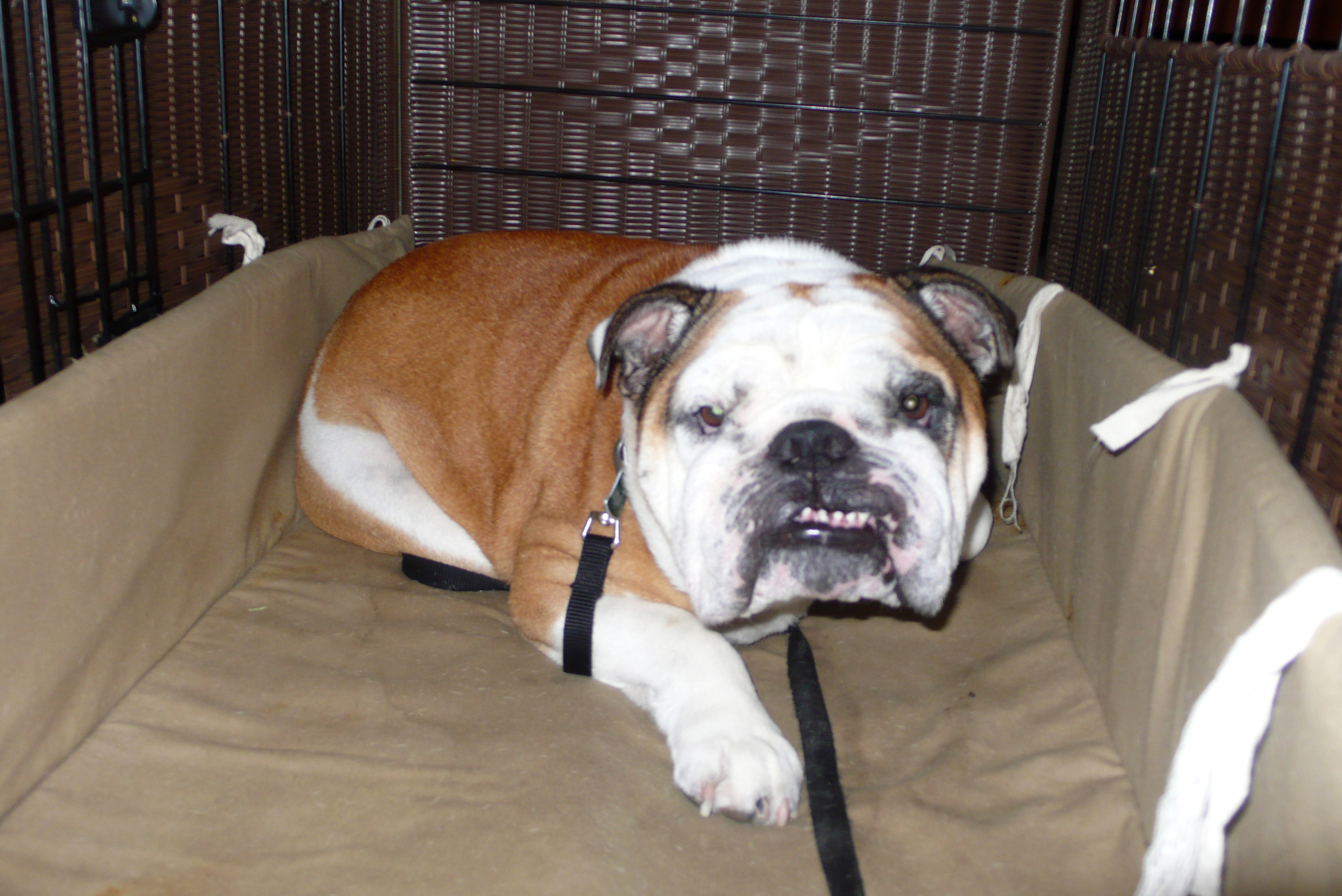
Jack spent his days in Wolfington Hall Jesuit Residence.

Jack was born May 3, 2003, at Brookhollow Kennel in Freehold Township, New Jersey, as a litter of one. He was the son of champion bulldog Copper Kid and a relation of Rocky the 1983 mascot. He was brought to campus on July 19, 2003, and placed in the care of Father Christopher Steck, S.J., a theology professor. His official name, as registered with the American Kennel Club was Brookhollow's John S. Carroll, which allows for the nickname Jack. This referred to Georgetown founder John Carroll, while "S." stood for Steck. Similarly the previous mascot was officially John P. Carroll, for Pilarz. He was also infrequently referred to as Jack IV, as the school was unsure of the exact number of dogs used as Jack in the 1970s.

Jack lived with Father Christopher Steck in New South Hall, but spent time in Wolfington Hall Jesuit Residence. In 2003, Father Steck started the "Jack Crew", a six-student organization of Jack's walkers and caretakers. Crew members were required to be able to show their school spirit and their ability to control Jack, including being aware of his affinity for orange traffic cones. Jack had both an email address, a Facebook profile, a student ID card, and a local phone number, and the campus directory listed him as part of the theology faculty, like Father Steck.

Jack attended home basketball games at the Verizon Center, where he entertained fans by attacking a cardboard box decorated with opponents' logos. This tradition developed after Steck discovered Jack's propensity for attacking boxes of brownie mix, and he originally decorated boxes for the games himself. Jack wore a leather collar studded with Georgetown pins, and occasionally wore a team jersey sporting the number one, which Steck purchased at the school bookstore. On campus, Jack attended student meetings and could be booked for social functions. He weighed 55 pounds (25 kg) and his color was described as "red fawn." Jack's personality was described as very social, but imperious and stubborn with "a sense of entitlement."

On March 11, 2012, Jack tore his ACL, and had to have surgery to repair it on April 23, 2012. In March 2013, school announced that Jack would "retire" from gameday duties after the end of the 2012–13 basketball season, and officially take a smaller role. Jack continued to live on campus with Steck until his death on June 2, 2015.

== Jack Junior ==
On March 30, 2012, Georgetown announced the donation of a new bulldog puppy from San Diego breeders Janice and Marcus Hochstetler, whose children Nathan and Rachel attend the school. The school named the puppy Jack Junior, or "J.J.", and his father was a breed champion, while his mother, named Treasure, and grandmother still live with the Hochstetler family. The puppy, who has been described as "laid back," was introduced to the community at a ceremony on April 13, 2012.

Students discovered during Homecoming 2012 that J.J. has an affinity for balloons, and during Midnight Madness he attacked blue and orange balloons, colors of Georgetown's arch-rival, Syracuse University. He had his debut at the Verizon Center on January 26, 2013, during a men's basketball victory over the Louisville Cardinals. On February 8, 2013, Jack and J.J. met with Butler University's mascots, Blue II and Blue III, who were in town on a goodwill tour to Atlantic 10 Conference members.

However, during the summer 2013, trainers at the school determined that, given the "exciting and hectic" life required of the school's mascot, it would be best for J.J. to return to a home environment, announcing their decision on July 31, 2013. An incident involving a small child during the fall 2012 semester, and a subsequent settlement with the child's family, may have contributed to the school's decision, though Georgetown spokesperson Rachel Pugh said it wasn't the only factor. Caretaker Rev. Christopher Steck, S.J. was surprised by the schools decision, and published a letter expressing his disappointment. In an editorial in The Hoya, Steck also lamented the school's choice not to involve the Bulldog Advisory Committee, which began meeting earlier in the summer, in its decision. After a search by Steck, J.J. was adopted by a family close to the Georgetown campus on August 18, 2013.

== John B. Carroll ==
On August 30, 2013, Pugh announced the arrival of a new puppy, also from the Hochstetler family and an offspring of Treasure, J.J.'s mother, though they come from different litters. Officially named Compatible's John B. Carroll, the dog's middle name stands for "Bulldog", unlike his predecessors, where the middle name referred to the caretaker's name. He was born on June 29, 2013, and was introduced on campus in late October 2013 with appearances at a men's soccer game against DePaul on October 23, and around Copley Lawn and Leo J. O'Donovan Hall. Jack weighs 50 pounds (23 kg) and his color is described as "fawn."

In early October 2013, the school announced that Steck would not be the new mascot's caretaker, but that another, not necessarily a Jesuit, would be selected from the Georgetown community. On November 5, 2013, the school choose 2013 graduate McKenzie Stough as the bulldog's caretaker. Besides being an alumna, McKenzie works as a Communications Specialist in the university's Office of Communications. Responding to criticism, the school involved the fourteen-member Bulldog Advisory Committee in the replacement process and selection of the caretaker. The Jack Crew will also be downsized from twenty students to "four or five" with the selection of this new caretaker.

Starting in December 2014, Jack began performing at home basketball games by riding a skateboard across the court. For the opening game of the 2015–16 season, the school produced bobblehead dolls of Jack on a skateboard, wearing jersey number 89 in honor of the year of the school's founding, 1789. As Jack got older, he also would ride around the court in a custom remote controlled truck.

== John F. Carroll ==
On July 24, 2019, the school acquired a new bulldog puppy from the Hochstetler family to work alongside the current Jack before taking on the role in the 2019–20 academic year. The new puppy was born January 24, 2019, in Alberta, Canada and was bred by IROC Bulldogs and Casa Grande Bulldogs. His official name is IROC Casagrande John F. Carroll, and he weighs about 51 pounds (23 kg). The school considers him to be the eighth bulldog and the seventh named Jack.

On July 10, 2023, Jack's official Instagram account revealed that he had passed "after a brief illness". It was later revealed that Jack died from complications with an intestinal disorder known as canine intestinal lymphangiectasia.

== John P. Carroll ==
Georgetown University welcomed its ninth mascot, Jack the Bulldog, in the Spring 2024 semester. Born on July 28, 2023, Jack (officially named Serchell's John P. Carroll) will follow tradition by engaging with the campus community, attending basketball games, and taking walks across campus with his handlers. The new mascot follows the unexpected passing of the previous Jack in July 2023, and Georgetown ensures measures for the health and protection of Jack No. 9.

== See also ==
- List of individual dogs
