= Mark Landler =

American journalist (born 1965)

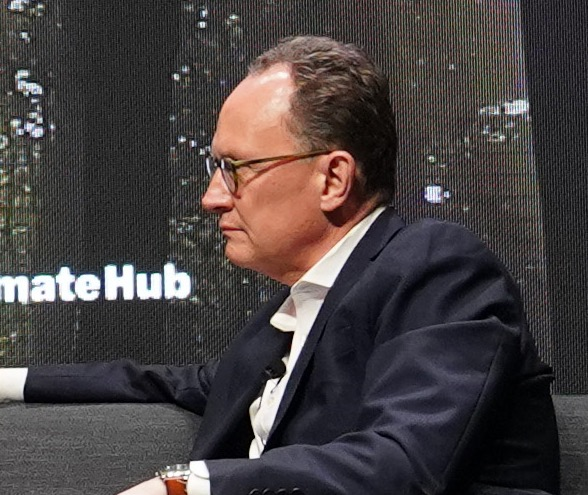
- Landler in 2021
- Born: Mark Aurel Landler; October 26, 1965 (age 60); Stuttgart, West Germany
- Occupation: Journalist
- Notable credit(s): The New York Times, Business Week
- Spouse: Angela Tung
- Children: 2

Mark Aurel Landler (born October 26, 1965) is an American journalist who is the Paris bureau chief of The New York Times. He was previously London bureau chief and a White House Correspondent, based in Washington, D.C.

== Early life and education ==
Born on October 26, 1965, in Stuttgart, West Germany, Landler graduated with a B.S. in international affairs from Georgetown University, where he served as the editor-in-chief of The Hoya. He was a Reuters Foundation Fellow at Oxford University in 1997.

== Career ==
Landler began his career at The New York Times in 1987 as a copy boy. From 1990 to 1995, he was a reporter and media editor at Business Week magazine. In 1995, Landler rejoined The Times as a financial reporter, covering the media business and telecommunications.

Landler was Hong Kong bureau chief for the Times from 1998 to 2002. From 2002 to 2008, he was European Economic Correspondent, based in Frankfurt. From 2009 to 2011, he was the newspaper's Diplomatic Correspondent, based in Washington, covering Secretary of State Hillary Clinton. He became a White House Correspondent in March 2011, first covering President Barack Obama and later President Donald Trump. Landler was the Times London bureau chief from 2019 to 2025. He became Paris bureau chief in January 2026.

Landler is a senior writer at the Times and has reported for the paper from 70 countries in Europe, Asia, Latin America, and the Middle East.

In 2007, he won an Overseas Press Club award for his work on a series about China and the environment.

Landler is the author of Alter Egos (Random House, 2016), a comparative study of the foreign policy of Barack Obama and Hillary Clinton, which was named a best book of 2016 by the Financial Times.

He was a recurring panelist on the PBS program Washington Week in 2018–2019 and has also provided commentary on the CBS Sunday news magazine Face the Nation.

Landler is a member of the Council on Foreign Relations.

== Personal life ==
Landler is married and lives in Paris with his wife, Angela Tung.
