= Jim Ricca =

American football player (1927–2007)

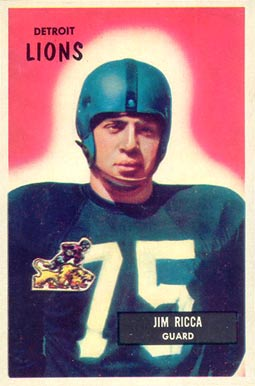
- Ricca on a 1955 Bowman football card

No. 75, 55, 68, 71
- Positions: Defensive tackle, guard

Personal information
- Born: October 8, 1927; Brooklyn, New York, U.S.
- Died: February 11, 2007 (aged 79); Fairfax, Virginia, U.S.
- Listed height: 6 ft 4 in (1.93 m)
- Listed weight: 270 lb (122 kg)

Career information
- College: Georgetown

Career history
- 1951–1954: Washington Redskins
- 1955: Detroit Lions
- 1955–1956: Philadelphia Eagles
- Stats at Pro Football Reference

James Emanuel "Big Jim" Ricca (/ˈrɪkə/ RIK-ə; October 8, 1927 – February 11, 2007) was a professional American football defensive tackle and guard for six seasons in the National Football League (NFL) for the Washington Redskins, Philadelphia Eagles and Detroit Lions.

== College career ==
For more than 50 years, Ricca was the last Georgetown University graduate to play in the NFL. The promotion of Alex Buzbee from the Washington Redskins practice squad to the active roster on December 19, 2007, ended the 51-year drought of Hoyas in the league. Ricca played for Georgetown from 1947 to 1949.

== Professional career ==
Ricca—considered a behemoth for his era at 6 feet 4 inches, 270 lbs.—logged 47 games for the Redskins from 1951 to 1954, playing primarily at middle guard.

He was traded to Detroit prior to the 1955 season. Ricca played in only six games for the Lions before being traded to Philadelphia after a post-game tirade by Detroit head coach Buddy Parker aboard the team plane following a 38–21 loss at San Francisco. He went on to play another season with Philadelphia. He retired after the 1956 season after a 60-game career.

== Personal life ==
After retiring from professional football, Ricca founded Jim Ricca and Associates, an advertising agency in Washington, D.C., in 1968.

Ricca's son John Ricca was a 1973 All-American defensive end and team captain at Duke University. He was the 12th-round pick of the New York Jets in the 1974 NFL draft and played professionally in the Canadian Football League and World Football League. After coaching high school football for many years at St. John's College High School in Washington, D.C. and then St. John's at Prospect Hall in Frederick, Maryland, he became an assistant coach at Catholic University.

Three of Ricca's grandsons were college quarterbacks. Kevin and Keith Ricca both hold records for passing at Catholic University. J.D. Ricca was twice named Virginia College Division Football Player of the Year at Hampden-Sydney College. One of his other grandsons, Patrick Collera-Ricca, played offensive lineman at Catholic University as well. His granddaughters are also accomplished athletes: Jamie Ricca was a 1,000-point scorer at St. John's College High School and played collegiate basketball at Marymount University. Kristi Ricca was a three-sport athlete at St. John's College High School and now serves as an educator in the community. Jacqui Ricca played lacrosse from 2004 to 2007 at Mount St. Mary's University, where she was named the 2007 Defensive Player of the Year.
