= The Hoya =

Student newspaper of Georgetown University

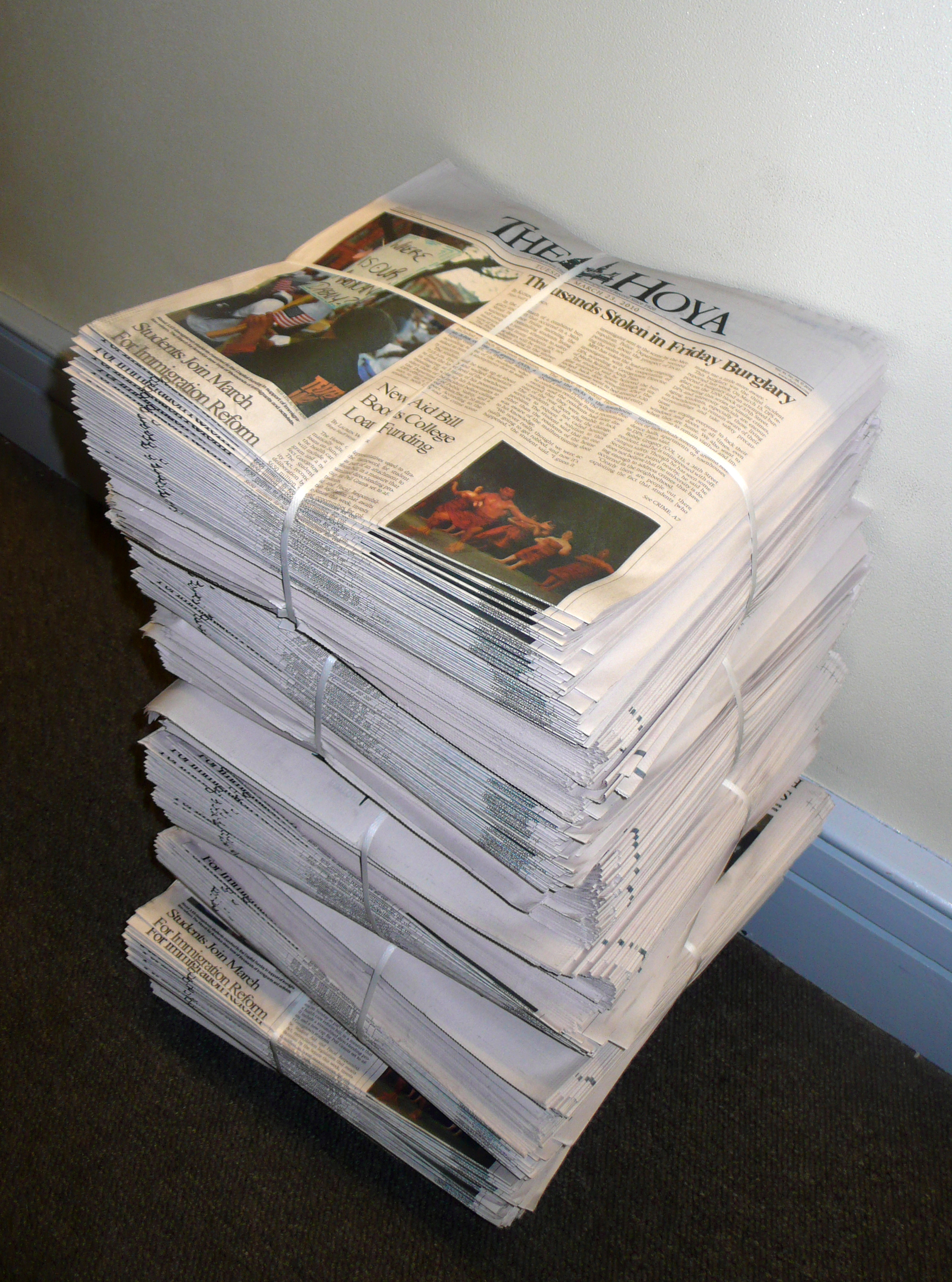
- The Hoya, Georgetown University's student newspaper
- Type: Student newspaper
- School: Georgetown University
- Editor-in-chief: Nora Toscano
- Staff writers: 300
- Founded: 1920; 106 years ago
- Headquarters: 421 Leavey Center, Georgetown University, Washington, D.C., U.S.
- Circulation: 4,000
- Website: thehoya.com
- Free online archives: DigitalGeorgetown; Illinois Digital Newspaper Collections; https://issuu.com/the_hoya

The Hoya, founded in 1920, is the oldest and largest student newspaper of Georgetown University in Washington, D.C., serving as the university’s newspaper of record. The Hoya is a student-run paper that prints every Friday and publishes online daily throughout the year, with a print circulation of 1,000 during the academic year. The newspaper has five main editorial sections: News, Opinion, Science, Sports and The Guide, a weekly arts and lifestyle magazine. It also publishes several annual special issues including a New Student Guide, a basketball preview and a semesterly fashion issue.

Although The Hoya is not financially independent from the university, it is produced, managed and edited entirely by students and maintains editorial independence. Over 300 students are involved in the publication of the paper.

== History ==
=== 20th century ===
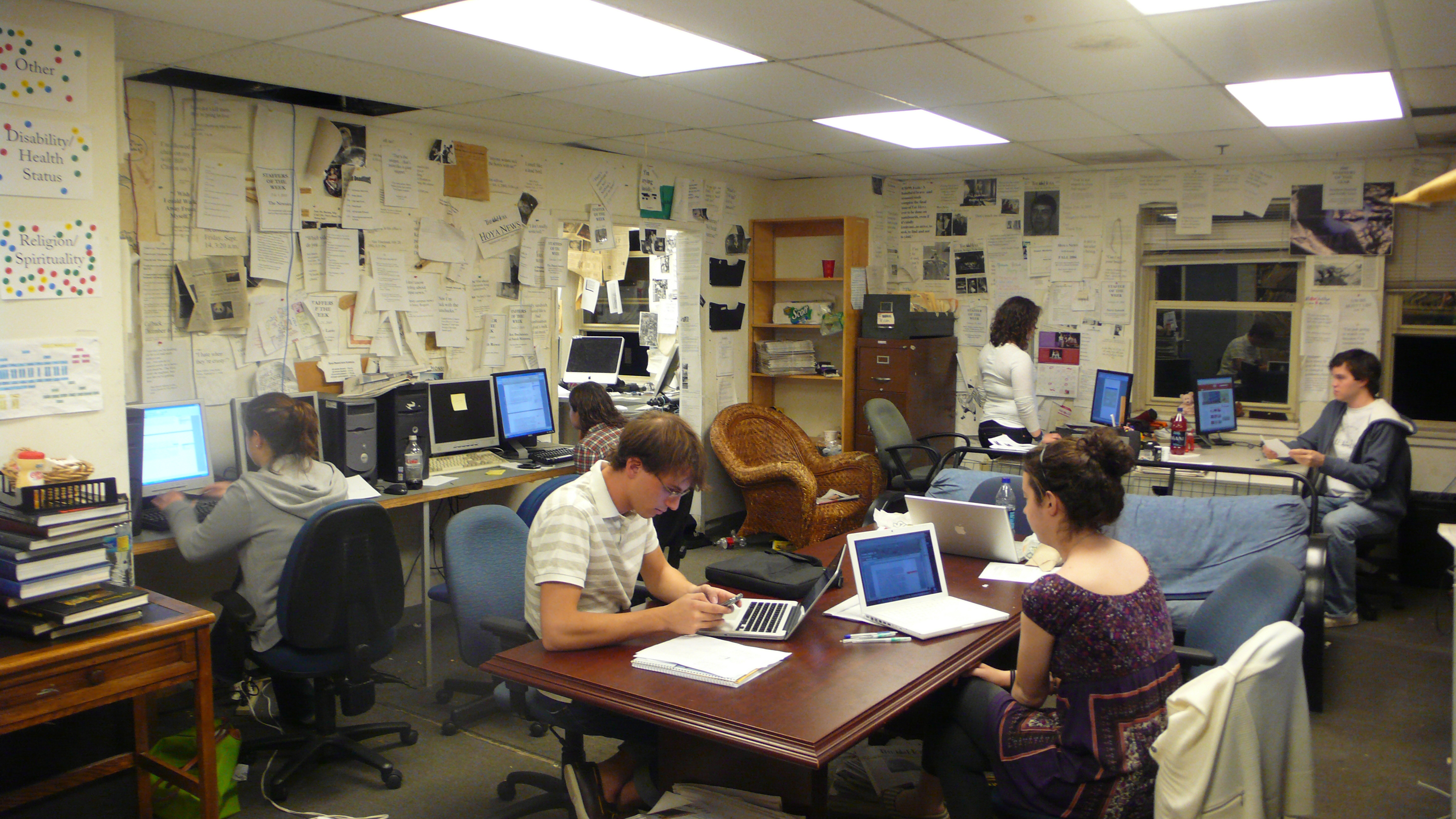
The Leavey Center, opened in 1988, is home to The Hoya's offices.

Blushing as coyly as any schoolgirl, and with the excited fears and hopes of a debutante … we lay this first edition of The Hoya at the feet of the student body, and retreat to a safe distance to observe the effects.

— Joseph R. Mickler, Jr, The Hoya's debut issue

The first issue of The Hoya was published on January 14, 1920, under the editorship of Joseph R. Mickler, Jr. Student journalism at Georgetown can be traced as far back as 1824 and the appearance of a hand-copied publication titled Minerva. The Hoya, however, was distinguished from previous student publications by its intent to be a comprehensive university newspaper. The publication took its name from the phrase 'Hoya Saxa', which had been adopted as a common chant at Georgetown sports events in the 1890s. The popularity of the term spread as local newspapers often cited the Hoya, and "Hoya" began to be widely applied to campus organizations and to athletic groups themselves.

Beginning in the 1940s, the publication shifted its main coverage from athletic to campus events. Weathering the Great Depression, World War II, student unrest in the 1960s and funding cuts in the 1970s, The Hoya has appeared almost continuously since its founding, providing a student perspective on issues and events.

In its early years, The Hoya published once a week, focused mainly on internal, campus affairs, promoting student organizations and school functions, and devoted a large part of its coverage to sports. In 1930, The Hoya received the highest rating given to a college weekly publication by the National Collegiate Press Association.

In the late 1930s, international events began to influence content. The Hoya was one of the few student groups to remain active during the war years, and its pages at this time juxtapose coverage of blood drives, war bond programs and alumni casualties with details of tea dances and intramural athletics.

In the post-World War II era, the paper's focus returned to internal campus issues, perhaps reflecting the desire of veterans, who made up most of the student body, to return to normal life. The 1950s saw the introduction of two recurring features: the Basketball Preview Issue, which first appeared on December 3, 1957, and the April Fools' issue.

One of the high points of The Hoya's entertainment reporting came in 1964, when one of its reporters managed to interview the Beatles, who were in Washington for their first live concert appearance in the U.S. The interview appeared in the issue of February 20, 1964.

In the 1970s, university support for the newspaper fell significantly; for example, funding was cut more than 55 percent between 1971 and 1975. As a result, the newspaper was forced to increase its advertising fourfold, and full-page advertisements became common. The paper changed its format from tabloid to broadsheet in the fall of 1976. As the Georgetown student body became more diverse, coverage of minority student groups increased, and articles on the activities and concerns of African American and Jewish students appeared.

Women's athletics received more detailed coverage, as did the impact of Title IX, and by the end of the decade, references to "girls" and "hoyettes" had been eliminated from the sports pages. Issues in the spring of 1973 contained coverage of attempts by gay students to organize and obtain official recognition.

==== Watergate scandal ====
In 1973 and 1974, a number of articles on the Nixon administration and the Watergate scandal were published. The coverage of Watergate is possibly linked to the fact that a number of players in the Watergate investigations had Georgetown connections.

In the post-Watergate era, perhaps influenced by the event, The Hoya began to run investigative journalism pieces. As a result, the paper went from being viewed as generally supportive of the administration to being one of the university’s chief antagonists. The spring of 1977 brought perhaps the most significant example of this when a story about the firing of five resident assistants led to a university hearing about the entire residence life system and, ultimately, to the resignation of both a vice president and a dean.

In the 1980s, the newspaper underwent a number of significant changes. The first issue in 1980, published on January 25, was the first to appear without the approval of a faculty moderator who had previously been a member of the editorial board. And, after six decades of appearing once a week, The Hoya moved to a twice-weekly schedule beginning in the fall of 1987. Other changes included the adoption of the current masthead in 1982 and the development of standard typefaces for headlines and copy.

In the 1990s, The Hoya consolidated and expanded its entertainment coverage into a pullout arts and lifestyle section titled The Guide. The paper already had a long tradition of providing coverage and reviews of both on-campus and off-campus entertainment, with reviews of off-campus plays and movies first appearing in 1929.

In 1998, The Hoya launched a website. The Hoya also has two official blogs, The Fourth Edition, launched in 2012, which provides a lighthearted take on Georgetown and D.C. news, and Hoya Paranoia, launched in 2008, which covers university athletics throughout the year as well as providing commentary on national and international sports news.

=== 21st century ===
The Hoya joined Facebook in 2008 and has been on Twitter since 2009.

In 2017, The Hoya announced its transition into an online-daily format, publishing articles on a daily rather than biweekly basis. In the move to an online format, the paper also reduced its print publication from two issues a week to one, cutting its Tuesday issue while retaining the weekly Friday edition.

In 2023, The Hoya launched a Science section to expand its coverage to science-related on-campus and off-campus topics.

==== Campaign for independence ====
In 2004, the newspaper began its official bid to gain financial independence from the university. The Hoya receives around $25,000 from Georgetown University for its operation annually. Late in 2004, the newspaper launched a publicity bid to build grassroots support for the proposition; the school seemed willing to allow the paper to split off, but not with the name "The Hoya", which administrators claimed belonged to the school. In 2007, the school filed for a trademark on the name.

The newspaper relaunched the campaign in early 2008 and circulated a petition that gained over 600 signatures from students and alumni. Though this campaign might have been successful, an April Fool's issue in 2009 put a hold on the independence movement. The issue included several articles that were perceived as racist and insensitive. The newspaper faced significant sanctions for the issue. In a Letter from the Editor in the first issue of the fall 2010 semester, The Hoya acknowledged that the notorious April Fools' day issue of 2009 was distasteful, but assured its readers that the newspaper would no longer participate in satirical issues. No April Fools' issues have been published since 2009. The Hoya's Board of Directors voted in 2010 to delay independence until the national economy and the paper's financial situation becomes more favorable.

==== Stewards Society exposé ====
In 2013, The Hoya ran a series of pieces as part of an exposé against the Stewards Society. This included a piece on the current student body president candidate who had undisclosed ties to the secret society. This piece would ultimately alter the course of the election outcome and increase scrutiny against the secret society. The Hoya would continue to run pieces on The Stewards' influence on the 2014 and 2015 races.

==== 2020 and COVID-19 response ====
At the onset of the COVID-19 pandemic in 2020, The Hoya temporarily paused their print issues and shifted to weekly newsletter-based distribution. The newspaper launched their TikTok account in the fall of 2020, garnering over 150,000 likes on their videos.

==== 2024 Data Leak exposé ====
On October 17, 2024, The Hoya broke news of a university-wide data breach that exposed a variety of students' personal data, including GPA, financial aid details, and social security numbers. The Hoya's reporting was cited by news outlets, including local ABC affiliate WJLA/ABC 7.

== Sections ==
=== Editorial ===
The editorial division is responsible for decisions regarding the content of The Hoya. Two executive editors and the managing editor are selected at the end of the fall and spring semesters and serve for one-semester terms. Senior editors of each section are elected at the end of the fall and spring semesters. Each section’s deputy editors are appointed by the respective senior editor. Senior editors serve one-semester terms at a time, and the editor-in-chief serves for an entire calendar year. The current editor-in-chief is Maren Fagan.

==== Editorial Board ====
The Editorial Board is composed of three staff members and three community members, and is chaired by the Senior Opinion Editors. The Editorial Board, which produces The Hoya's editorials, is an autonomous body whose views do not represent the opinions of The Hoya. The current chairs are Ella O'Connor and Thejas Kumar.

=== Publishing ===
The publishing division manages the business operations. The general manager and departmental directors are hired by the board of directors. The current general manager is Peter Sloniewsky.

=== Board of directors ===
The board of directors oversees the overall strategic direction of the newspaper. The current chair of the board of directors is Jack Willis.

== Awards ==
The Hoya has won several national awards, including:

- 2008: Associated Collegiate Press National Pacemaker Award, College Newspaper
- 2003 and 2005: Associated Collegiate Press National Pacemaker Award, Online

== Notable alumni ==
=== Academia ===
- Leo J. O'Donovan, former President of Georgetown University
- Scott Pilarz, former president, Marquette University and the University of Scranton
- Edward F. Sherman, former dean and law professor, Tulane University Law School
- Debora Spar, Barnard College president, Goldman Sachs director, and former Harvard Business School professor
- Mark von Hagen - professor of history, Arizona State University

=== Business ===
- Andy Billig, co-owner of the Spokane Indians
- Walter Briggs, Jr., former owner and general manager of the Detroit Tigers
- David Wehner, CFO, Facebook

=== Government and politics ===
- Jeremy Bash, chief of staff to Secretary of Defense Leon Panetta
- Philip Hart, former U.S. Senator from Michigan
- Frank Keating, 25th Governor of Oklahoma
- Ron Klain, former Chief of Staff to President Joe Biden, former Chief of Staff to Vice President Al Gore
- Stephen Mull, U.S. ambassador to Poland
- Pat Quinn, 41st Governor of Illinois

=== Media, culture, and entertainment ===
- Melissa Anelli, author, Harry, A History, webmaster of The Leaky Cauldron
- William Peter Blatty, author, The Exorcist and Academy Award for Best Writing (Adapted Screenplay) recipient
- Quin Hillyer, columnist, The American Spectator
- Mary Jordan, journalist, The Washington Post, co-winner of the Pulitzer Prize for International Reporting in 2003
- Mark Landler, journalist, The New York Times and Bloomberg Businessweek
- J. D. McClatchy, editor, The Yale Review and literary critic
- Tara McKelvey, journalist, Newsweek and The Daily Beast
- Don Murphy, producer, Natural Born Killers and the Transformers series
- Jonathan Nolan, author, Memento Mori, co-writer of screenplays The Dark Knight, The Dark Knight Rises, and Interstellar
- Miles O'Brien, science and technology correspondent, CNN
- James Johnson Sweeney, former director, Solomon R. Guggenheim Museum and former curator, Museum of Modern Art
- Kara Swisher, technology columnist, The Wall Street Journal and co-creator of All Things Digital
- Matthew VanDyke, journalist and documentary filmmaker
- Gabe Fleisher, journalist, author of Wake Up To Politics (current student)

=== Religion ===
- Joseph Bernard Brunini, former Bishop of Jackson
- George Henry Guilfoyle, former Bishop of Camden

== In popular culture ==
In The West Wing episode "Take out the Trash Day", Sam Seaborn mentions The Hoya, which is investigating an allegedly racist sociology professor whose class is attended by First Daughter Zoey Bartlet.
