= List of Latin phrases (P) =

This page is one of a series listing English translations of notable Latin phrases, such as veni, vidi, vici and et cetera. Some of the phrases are themselves translations of Greek phrases, as ancient Greek rhetoric and literature started centuries before the beginning of Latin literature in ancient Rome.

Latin	Translation	Notes
pace	[with] peace [to]	"With all due respect to", "with due deference to", "by leave of", "no offence to", or "despite (with respect)". Used to politely acknowledge someone with whom the speaker or writer disagrees or finds irrelevant to the main argument. Ablative form of pax, "peace."
pace ac bello merita	Service during peace and war	Motto of the US Federal Emergency Management Agency shown on its flag
pace tua	with your peace	Thus, "with your permission"
Pacem in terris	Peace on Earth	1963 encyclical by Pope John XXIII
pacta sunt servanda	agreements must be kept	Also "contracts must be honoured". Indicates the binding power of treaties. One of the fundamental rules of international law.
palma non sine pulvere	no reward without effort	Also "dare to try"; motto of numerous schools.
palmam qui meruit ferat	He who has earned the palm, let him bear it.	Loosely, "achievement should be rewarded" (or, "let the symbol of victory go to him who has deserved it"); frequently used motto
panem et circenses	bread and circuses	From Juvenal, Satires, book IV, satire X, line 81. Originally described all that was needed for emperors to placate the Roman mob. Today used to describe any entertainment used to distract public attention from more important matters.
par sit fortuna labori	Let the success be equal to the labor.	This motto is of the families Buchanan, Lowman, and Palmer, according to Burke's Peerage & Baronetage.
parvus pendetur fur, magnus abire videtur	The petty thief is hanged, the big thief gets away.	
para bellum	prepare for war	From "Si vis pacem para bellum": if you want peace, prepare for war—if a country is ready for war, its enemies are less likely to attack. Usually used to support a policy of peace through strength (deterrence). In antiquity, however, the Romans viewed peace as the aftermath of successful conquest through war, so in this sense the proverb identifies war as the means through which peace will be achieved.
parare Domino plebem perfectam	to prepare for God a perfect people	motto of the St. Jean Baptiste High School
parati vero parati	ready aye ready	The motto of the Royal Canadian Navy.
parce sepulto	forgive the interred	it is ungenerous to hold resentment toward the dead. Quote from the Aeneid, III 13-68.
parens patriae	parent of the nation	A public policy requiring courts to protect the best interests of any child involved in a lawsuit. See also Pater Patriae.
pari passu	with equal step	Thus, "moving together", "simultaneously", etc. Also used to abbreviate the principle that in bankruptcy creditors must all get the same proportion of their debt.
parturiunt montes, nascetur ridiculus mus	The mountains are in labour, a ridiculous mouse will be born.	said of works that promise much at the outset but yield little in the end (Horace, Ars poetica 137) – see also The Mountain in Labour
parum luceat	It does not shine [being darkened by shade].	Quintilian, Institutio Oratoria, 1/6:34 – see also lucus a nonlucendo
parva sub ingenti	the small under the huge	Implies that the weak are under the protection of the strong, rather than that they are inferior. Motto of Prince Edward Island.
parvis imbutus tentabis grandia tutus	When you are steeped in little things, you shall safely attempt great things.	Motto of Barnard Castle School, sometimes translated as "Once you have accomplished small things, you may attempt great ones safely".
passim	here and there, everywhere	Less literally, "throughout" or "frequently". Said of a word, fact or notion that occurs several times in a cited text. Also used in proofreading, where it refers to a change that is to be repeated everywhere needed. See also et passim.
pater familias	father of the family	Or "master of the house". The eldest male in a family, who held patria potestas ("paternal power"). In Roman law, a father had enormous power over his children, wife, and slaves, though these rights dwindled over time. Derived from the phrase pater familias, an Old Latin expression preserving the archaic -as ending for the genitive case.
Pater Omnipotens	Father Almighty	A more direct translation would be "omnipotent father".
Pater Patriae	father of the nation	A Latin honorific meaning "Father of the Country", or more literally, "Father of the Fatherland".
pater peccavi	Father, I have sinned	The traditional beginning of a Roman Catholic confession.
pauca sed bona	few, but good	Similar to "quality over quantity"; though there may be few of something, at least they are of good quality.
pauca sed matura	few, but ripe	Said to be one of Carl Gauss's favorite quotations. Used in The King and I by Rodgers and Hammerstein.
paulatim ergo certe	slowly therefore surely	Former motto of Latymer Upper School in London (the text latim er is concealed in the words)
paulatim sed firmiter	slowly but surely	Motto of University College School in London
pax aeterna	eternal peace	A common epitaph
Pax Americana	American Peace	A euphemism for the United States of America and its sphere of influence. Adapted from Pax Romana.
Pax Britannica	British Peace	A euphemism for the British Empire. Adapted from Pax Romana
Pax Christi	Peace of Christ	Used as a wish before the Holy Communion in the Catholic Mass, also the name of the peace movement Pax Christi
pax Dei	peace of God	Used in the Peace and Truce of God movement in 10th-century France
Pax Deorum	Peace of the gods	Like the vast majority of inhabitants of the ancient world, the Romans practiced pagan rituals, believing it important to achieve a state of Pax Deorum (The Peace of the gods) instead of Ira Deorum (The Wrath of the gods).
Pax, Domine	peace, lord	lord or master; used as a form of address when speaking to clergy or educated professionals
pax et bonum	peace and the good	Motto of St. Francis of Assisi and, consequently, of his monastery in Assisi; understood by Catholics to mean 'Peace and Goodness be with you,' as is similar in the Mass; translated in Italian as pace e bene.
pax et justitia	peace and justice	Motto of Saint Vincent and the Grenadines
pax et lux	peace and light	Motto of Tufts University and various schools
Pax Europaea	European Peace	euphemism for Europe after World War II
Pax Hispanica	Spanish Peace	Euphemism for the Spanish Empire; specifically can mean the twenty-three years of supreme Spanish dominance in Europe (approximately 1598–1621). Adapted from Pax Romana.
pax in terra	peace on earth	Used to exemplify the desired state of peace on earth
Pax Indica	Indian Peace	Term for hegemony of India in its sphere of influence; adapted from Pax Romana; also a 2012 book by Shashi Tharoor
Pax intrantibus, salus exeuntibus	Peace to those who enter, health to those who depart.	Used as an inscription over the entrance of buildings (especially homes, monasteries, inns). Often benedicto habitantibus (Blessings on those who abide here) is added.
pax matrum, ergo pax familiarum	peace of mothers, therefore peace of families	If the mother is peaceful, then the family is peaceful. The inverse of the Southern United States saying, "If mama ain't happy, ain't nobody happy."
Pax Mongolica	Mongolian Peace	period of peace and prosperity in Asia during the Mongol Empire
pax optima rerum	peace is the greatest good	Silius Italicus, Punica (11,595); motto of Kiel University
Pax Romana	Roman Peace	period of relative prosperity and lack of conflict in the early Roman Empire
Pax Sinica	Chinese Peace	period of peace in East Asia during times of strong Chinese hegemony
Pax tecum	peace be with you (singular)	
Pax tibi, Marce, Evangelista meus. Hic requiescet corpus tuum.	Peace to you, Mark, my Evangelist. Here will rest your body.	Legend states that when the evangelist went to the lagoon where Venice would later be founded, an angel came and said this. The first part is depicted as the note in the book shown opened by the lion of St Mark's Basilica, Venice; registered trademark of the Assicurazioni Generali, Trieste.
pax vobiscum	peace [be] with you	A common farewell. The "you" is plural ("you all"), so the phrase must be used when speaking to more than one person; pax tecum is the form used when speaking to only one person.
peccavi	I have sinned	Telegraph message and pun from Charles Napier, British general, upon completely subjugating the Indian province of Sindh in 1842 ('I have Sindh'). This is, arguably, the most terse military despatch ever sent. The story is apocryphal.
pecunia non olet	money doesn't smell	According to Suetonius' De vita Caesarum, when Emperor Vespasian was challenged by his son Titus for taxing the public lavatories, the emperor held up a coin before his son and asked whether it smelled or simply said non olet ("it doesn't smell"). From this, the phrase was expanded to pecunia non olet, or rarely aes non olet ("copper doesn't smell").
pecunia, si uti scis, ancilla est; si nescis, domina	if you know how to use money, money is your slave; if you don't, money is your master	Written on an old Latin tablet in downtown Verona (Italy).
pede poena claudo	punishment comes limping	That is, retribution comes slowly but surely. From Horace, Odes, 3, 2, 32.
pendent opera interrupta	the works hang interrupted	From the Aeneid of Virgil, Book IV
per	By, through, by means of	See specific phrases below
per angusta ad augusta	through difficulties to greatness	Joining sentence of the conspirators in the drama Hernani by Victor Hugo (1830). The motto of numerous educational establishments.
per annum (pa.)	each year	Thus, "yearly"—occurring every year
per ardua	through adversity	Motto of the British RAF Regiment
per ardua ad alta	through difficulty to heights	Through hardship, great heights are reached; frequently used motto
per ardua ad astra	through adversity to the stars	Motto of the Royal, Royal Australian and Royal New Zealand Air Forces, the U. S. State of Kansas and of several schools. The phrase is used by Latin Poet Virgil in the Aeneid; also used in H. Rider Haggard's novel The People of the Mist.
per aspera ad astra	through hardships to the stars	From Seneca the Younger; frequently used motto, sometimes as ad astra per aspera ("to the stars through hardships")
per capita	by heads	"Per head", i.e., "per person", a ratio by the number of persons. The singular is per caput.
per capsulam	through the small box	That is, "by letter"
per contra	through the contrary	Or "on the contrary" (cf. a contrario)
per crucem vincemus	through the cross we shall conquer	Motto of St John Fisher Catholic High School, Dewsbury
Per Crucem Crescens	through the cross, growth	Motto of Lambda Chi Alpha
per curiam	through the senate	Legal term meaning "by the court", as in a per curiam decision
per definitionem	through the definition	Thus, "by definition"
per diem (pd.)	by day	Thus, "per day". A specific amount of money an organization allows an individual to spend per day, typically for travel expenses.
per fas et nefas	through right or wrong	By fair means or foul
per fidem intrepidus	fearless through faith	
per incuriam	through inadvertence or carelessness	Legal term referring to a decision that was made by a court through a clear mistake or unawareness of something, such as forgetting to take some binding precedent into account
per literas regias per lit. reg. per regias literas per reg. lit. etc.	by royal letters	by letters patent; of academic degrees: awarded by letters patent from the King/Queen, rather than by a University
per mare per terram	by sea and by land	Motto of the Royal Marines and (with small difference) of Clan Donald and the Compagnies Franches de la Marine
per mensem (pm.)	by month	Thus, "per month", or "monthly"
per multum cras, cras, crebro dilabitur aetas	what can be done today should not be delayed	
per os (p.o.)	through the mouth	Medical shorthand for "by mouth"
per pedes	by feet	Used of a certain place that can be traversed or reached by foot, or to indicate that one is travelling by foot as opposed to by a vehicle
per procura (p.p. or per pro)	through the agency	Also rendered per procurationem. Used to indicate that a person is signing a document on behalf of another person. Correctly placed before the name of the person signing, but often placed before the name of the person on whose behalf the document is signed, sometimes through incorrect translation of the alternative abbreviation per pro. as "for and on behalf of".
per quod	by reason of which	In a UK legal context: "by reason of which" (as opposed to per se which requires no reasoning). In American jurisprudence often refers to a spouse's claim for loss of consortium.
per rectum (pr)	through the rectum	Medical shorthand; see also per os
per rectum ad astra	via rectum to the stars	a modern parody of per aspera ad astra, originating and most commonly used in Russia, meaning that the path to success took you through most undesirable and objectionable places or environments; or that a found solution to a complex problem is extremely convoluted.
per risum multum poteris cognoscere stultum	by excessive laughter one can recognise the fool	
per scientiam ad salutem	through science to health	Motto of The Michener Institute
per se	through itself	Also "by itself" or "in itself". Without referring to anything else, intrinsically, taken without qualifications etc. A common example is negligence per se. See also malum in se.
per stirpes	through the roots	Used in wills to indicate that each "branch" of the testator's family should inherit equally. Contrasted with per capita.
per unitatem vis	through unity, strength	Motto of Texas A&M University Corps of Cadets
per veritatem vis	through truth, strength	Motto of Washington University in St. Louis
per volar sunata^{[sic]}	born to soar	Frequently used motto; not from Latin but from Dante's Purgatorio, Canto XII, 95, the Italian phrase "per volar sù nata".
Perfer et obdura; dolor hic tibi proderit olim	Be patient and tough; some day this pain will be useful to you.	From Ovid, Amores, Book III, Elegy XI
periculum in mora	danger in delay	
perinde ac [si] cadaver [essent]	[well-disciplined] like a corpse	Phrase written by St. Ignatius of Loyola in his Constitutiones Societatis Iesu (1954)
perita manus mens exculta	skilled hand, cultivated mind	Motto of RMIT University in Melbourne, Australia
perge sequar	advance, I follow	from Virgil's Aeneid IV 114; in Vergil's context: "proceed with your plan, I will do my part."
Pericula ludus	Danger is my pleasure	Motto of the Foreign Legion Detachment in Mayotte
perpetuum mobile	thing in perpetual motion	A musical term; also used to refer to hypothetical perpetual motion machines
Perseverantia et Fide in Deo	Perseverance and Faith in God	Motto of Bombay Scottish School, Mahim, India
persona non grata	person not pleasing	An unwelcome, unwanted or undesirable person. In diplomatic contexts, a person rejected by the host government. The reverse, persona grata ("pleasing person"), is less common, and refers to a diplomat acceptable to the government of the country to which he is sent.
Pes meus stetit in directo	My foot has stood in the right way (or in uprightness; in integrity)	Motto of the Light Armoured Cavalry Regiment Santiago No 1, Spanish Army; Psalm 26:12
petitio principii	request of the beginning	Begging the question, a logical fallacy in which a proposition to be proved is implicitly or explicitly assumed in one of the premises
pia desideria	pious longings	Or "dutiful desires"
pia fraus	pious fraud	Or "dutiful deceit". Expression from Ovid; used to describe deception which serves Church purposes
pia mater	pious mother	Or "tender mother". The delicate innermost of the three membranes that cover the brain and spinal cord.
Pietate et doctrina tuta libertas	Freedom is made safe through character and learning	Motto of Dickinson College
pinxit	one painted	Thus, "he painted this" or "she painted this". Formerly used on works of art, next to the artist's name.
piscem natare doces	[you] teach a fish to swim	Latin proverb, attributed by Erasmus in his Adagia to Greek origin (Diogenianus, Ἰχθὺν νήχεσθαι διδάσκεις); corollary Chinese idiom (班門弄斧)
piscis primum a capite foetet	the fish stinks first from the head	Found in Erasmus's Adages; similarly in Greek (Ἰχθὺς ἐκ τῆς κεφαλῆς ὄζειν ἄρχεται), fifteenth century CE Paroemiae of Michael Apostolius Paroemiographus.
placet	it pleases	expression of assent
plaudite, cives	applaud, citizens	Said by ancient comic actors to solicit the audience's applause
plene scriptum	fully written	
plenus venter non studet libenter	A full belly does not like studying	I.e., it is difficult to concentrate on mental tasks after a heavy meal. The following variant is also attested: plenus si venter renuit studere libenter (the belly, when full, refuses to study willingly).
plenus venter facile de ieiuniis disputat	A full belly readily discusses fasting.	Hieronymus, Epistulæ 58,2
plurale tantum pl. pluralia tantum	plural only	nouns that only occur in the plural form
pluralis majestatis	plural of majesty	The first-person plural pronoun when used by an important personage to refer to himself or herself; also known as the "royal we"
pluralis modestiae	plural of modesty	
plus minusve (p.m.v.)	more or less	Frequently found on Roman funerary inscriptions to denote that the age of a decedent is approximate
plus ultra	further beyond	National motto of Spain and a number of other institutions
pollice compresso favor iudicabatur	goodwill decided by compressed thumb	Life was spared with a thumb tucked inside a closed fist, simulating a sheathed weapon. Conversely, a thumb up meant to unsheath your sword.
pollice verso	with a turned thumb	Used by Roman crowds to pass judgment on a defeated gladiator. The type of gesture used is uncertain. Also the name of a famous painting depicting gladiators by Jean-Léon Gérôme.
Polonia Restituta	Rebirth of Poland	
pons asinorum	bridge of asses	Any obstacle that stupid people find hard to cross. Originally used of Euclid's Fifth Proposition in geometry.
pontifex maximus	greatest high priest	Or "supreme pontiff". Originally an office in the Roman Republic, later a title held by Roman emperors, and later a traditional epithet of the pope. The pontifices were the most important priestly college of the religion in ancient Rome; their name is usually thought to derive from pons facere ("to make a bridge"), which in turn is usually linked to their religious authority over the bridges of Rome, especially the Pons Sublicius.
posse comitatus	force of the county	Thus, to be able to be made into part of a retinue or force. In common law, a sheriff's right to compel people to assist law enforcement in unusual situations.
possunt quia posse videntur	They can because they think they can	Inscription on the back of Putney medals, awarded to boat race winning Oxford blues. From Virgil's Aeneid Book V line 231. Also the motto of Foster's School, Sherborne, Dorset (1640-1992).
post aut propter	after it or by means of it	Causality between two phenomena is not established (cf. post hoc, ergo propter hoc)
post cibum (p.c.)	after food	Medical shorthand for "after meals" (cf. ante cibum)
post coitum	After sex	After sexual intercourse
post coitum omne animal triste est sive gallus et mulier	After sexual intercourse every animal is sad, except the cock (rooster) and the woman	Or: triste est omne animal post coitum, praeter mulierem gallumque. Attributed to Galen of Pergamum.
post eventum	after the event	Refers to an action or occurrence that takes place after the event that is being discussed (similar in meaning to post factum). More specifically, it may refer to a person who is recounting an event long after it took place, implying that details of the story may have changed over time. (Some sources attribute this expression to George Eliot.)
post factum	after the fact	Not to be confused with ex post facto.
post festum	after the feast	Too late, or after the fact
post hoc ergo propter hoc	after this, therefore because of this	A logical fallacy where one assumes that one thing happening after another thing means that the first thing caused the second.
post meridiem (p.m.)	after midday	The period from noon to midnight (cf. ante meridiem)
post mortem (pm)	after death	Usually rendered postmortem. Not to be confused with post meridiem
Post mortem auctoris (p.m.a.)	after the author's death	The phrase is used in legal terminology in the context of intellectual property rights, especially copyright, which commonly lasts until a certain number of years after the author's death.
post nubila phoebus	after the clouds, the sun	Motto of the University of Zulia, Venezuela, as well as Hartford, Connecticut
post nubes lux	out of darkness, light	Motto of Cranfield University
post scriptum (p.s.)	after what has been written	A postscript. Used to mark additions to a letter, after the signature. Can be extended to post post scriptum (p.p.s.), etc.
post tenebras lux, or, post tenebras spero lucem	after darkness, [I hope for] light	from Vulgata, Job 17:12; frequently used motto
postera crescam laude	I am going to grow in the esteem of future generations	Motto of the University of Melbourne
praemia virtutis honores	honours are the rewards of virtue	Motto of the Portsmouth Grammar School
praemonitus praemunitus	forewarned is forearmed	Common catch phrase of the title character of the novel Captain Blood
praesis ut prosis	Lead in order to serve.	Motto of Lancaster Royal Grammar School
praestant interna (coronae)	what is inside is better (than the crown)	Motto emphasizing that a person excels primarily through their inner virtues rather than their physical attributes or social rank—a topos in classical rhetoric, inspired in particular by the biblical figure of David who, according to the Old Testament (1 Samuel 17), triumphed over Goliath through faith, bravery and tactical intelligence, despite a physical disadvantage. The theme is also recurrent in Greco-Roman mythology, for instance in the Labours of Hercules or Homer's Odyssey. Historically, court artists used this motto as a propaganda tool to reinforce the legitimacy of sovereigns—particularly absolute or divine right monarchs like Louis XIV—by praising their personal merits over mere hereditary claims to the crown, as in L'Automne (Autumn) by Charles Le Brun. The motto was sometimes associated with the symbol of the pomegranate whose tasty arils are hidden inside a tough epicarp topped by a persistent calyx shaped like a crown or, when viewed from above, like the six-pointed Star of David, the pomegranate being, in Judeo-Christian and Masonic iconography and ornamentation, a traditional symbol of biblical royalty.
praeter legem	after the law	Legal terminology, international law
Praga Caput Regni	Prague, Head of the Kingdom	Motto of Prague from Middle Ages
Praga Caput Rei publicae	Prague, Head of the Republic	Motto of Prague from 1991
Praga mater urbium	Prague, Mother of Cities	Motto of Prague from 1927
Praga totius Bohemiae domina	Prague, the mistress of the whole of Bohemia	Former motto of Prague
pretium laborum non vile	No mean reward for labour	Motto of the Order of the Golden Fleece
pretiumque et causa laboris	The prize and the cause of our labour	Motto of Burnley Football Club; from Ovid's Metamorphoses, 4.739 (Latin)/English): "The Tale of Perseus and Andromeda": resoluta catenis incedit virgo, pretiumque et causa laboris. ("freed of her chains the virgin approaches, cause and reward of the enterprise.")
prima facie	at first sight	Used to designate evidence in a trial which is suggestive, but not conclusive, of something (e.g., a person's guilt)
prima luce	at dawn	Literally "at first light"
primas sum: primatum nil a me alienum puto	I am a primate; nothing about primates is foreign to me	A sentence by the American anthropologist Earnest Hooton and the slogan of primatologists and lovers of primates. Derived from homo sum, humani a me nihil alienum puto.
primum mobile	first moving thing	Or "first thing able to be moved"; see primum movens
primum movens	prime mover	Or "first moving one". A common theological term, such as in the cosmological argument, based on the assumption that God was the first entity to "move" or "cause" anything. Aristotle was one of the first philosophers to discuss the "uncaused cause", a hypothetical originator—and violator—of causality.
primum non nocere	first, to not harm	A medical precept. Often falsely attributed to the Hippocratic Oath, though its true source is probably a paraphrase from Hippocrates' Epidemics, where he wrote, "Declare the past, diagnose the present, foretell the future; practice these acts. As to diseases, make a habit of two things: to help, or at least to do no harm."
primus inter pares	first among equals	Position of the Ecumenical Patriarch in the Eastern Orthodox Church, position of the President of the Swiss Confederation among the members of the Federal Council, and a title of the Roman Emperors (cf. princeps).
principia probant non probantur	principles prove; they are not proved	Fundamental principles require no proof; they are assumed a priori.
principiis obsta (et respice finem)	resist the beginnings (and consider the end)	Ovid, Remedia Amoris, 91
principium individuationis	Individuation	psychological term: the self-formation of the personality into a coherent whole
prior tempore potior iure	earlier in time, stronger in law	“First in time, greater in right.”A maxim meaning that the law favors those who establish their rights earlier rather than later. This principle is often cited in private law to support the claims of prior creditors over later creditors.
pro aris et focis	For altars and hearths	The motto of the Royal Queensland Regiment, and many other regiments.
pro bono publico	for the public good	Often abbreviated pro bono. Work undertaken voluntarily at no expense, such as public services. Often used of a lawyer's work that is not charged for.
pro Brasilia fiant eximia	let exceptional things be made for Brazil	Motto of São Paulo state, Brazil.
pro Deo Domo Patria	For God, home and country	Motto of the University of Mary Washington
pro Deo et Patria	For God and Country	Frequently used motto
pro domo (sua)	for (one’s own) home or house	serving the interests of a given perspective or for the benefit of a given group.
pro Ecclesia, pro Texana	For Church, For Texas	Motto of Baylor University, a private Christian Baptist university in Waco, Texas.
pro fide et patria	for faith and fatherland	Motto of the originally Irish Muldoon family and of several schools, such as the Diocesan College (Bishops) in Cape Town, South Africa, and All Hallows High School in the Bronx, New York.
pro forma	for form	Or "as a matter of form". Prescribing a set form or procedure, or performed in a set manner.
pro gloria et patria	for glory and fatherland	Motto of Prussia
pro hac vice	for this occasion	Request of a state court to allow an out-of-state lawyer to represent a client.
pro multis	for many	It is part of the Rite of Consecration of the wine in Western Christianity tradition, as part of the Mass.
pro parte	in part	Frequently used in taxonomy to refer to part of a group.
pro patria	for country	Pro Patria Medal: for operational service (minimum 55 days) in defence of the Republic South Africa or in the prevention or suppression of terrorism; issued for the Border War (counter-insurgency operations in South West Africa 1966–89) and for campaigns in Angola (1975–76 and 1987–88). Motto of The Royal Canadian Regiment, Royal South Australia Regiment, Hurlstone Agricultural High School.
pro patria vigilans	watchful for the country	Motto of the United States Army Signal Corps.
pro populo et gloria	for the people and glory	Motto of HMS Westminster
pro per	for self	to defend oneself in court without counsel; abbreviation of propria persona. See also: pro se.
pro rata	for the rate	i.e., proportionately.
pro re nata (PRN, prn)	for a thing that has been born	Medical shorthand for "as the occasion arises" or "as needed". Also "concerning a matter having come into being". Used to describe a meeting of a special Presbytery or Assembly called to discuss something new, and which was previously unforeseen (literally: "concerning a matter having been born").
pro rege et lege	for king and the law	Found on the Leeds coat of arms.
pro rege, lege et grege	for king, the law and the people	Found on the coat of arms of Perth, Scotland.
pro se	for oneself	to defend oneself in court without counsel. Some jurisdictions prefer, "pro per".
pro scientia atque sapientia	for knowledge and wisdom	motto of Stuyvesant High School in New York City
pro scientia et patria	for science and nation	motto of the National University of La Plata
pro studio et labore	for study and work	
pro tanto	for so much	Denotes something that has only been partially fulfilled. A philosophical term indicating the acceptance of a theory or idea without fully accepting the explanation.
pro tanto quid retribuemus	what shall we give in return for so much	The motto of the city of Belfast; taken from the Vulgate translation of Psalm 116.
pro tempore	for the time (being)	Denotes a temporary current situation; abbreviated pro tem.
probatio pennae	testing of the pen	Medieval Latin term for breaking in a new pen
probis pateo	I am open for honest people	Traditionally inscribed above a city gate or above the front entrance of a dwelling or place of learning.
procedendo	to be proceeded with	From procedendo ad judicium, "to be proceeded with to judgment." A prerogative writ, by which a superior court requires an inferior one to rule on a matter it has neglected.
prodesse quam conspici	To Accomplish Rather Than To Be Conspicuous	motto of Miami University
prohibito	I prohibit	A prerogative writ, by which a superior court prohibits an inferior court from hearing a matter outside its jurisdiction; also called a writ of prohibition.
propria manu (p.m.)	"by one's own hand"	
propter vitam vivendi perdere causas	to destroy the reasons for living for the sake of life	That is, to squander life's purpose just in order to stay alive, and live a meaningless life. From Juvenal, Satyricon VIII, verses 83–84.
protectio trahit subjectionem, et subjectio protectionem	Protection draws allegiance, and allegiance draws protection	Legal maxim, indicating that reciprocity of fealty with protection
provehito in altum	launch forward into the deep	motto of Memorial University of Newfoundland
proxime accessit	he came next	the runner-up
proximo mense (prox.)	in the following month	Used in formal correspondence to refer to the next month. Used with ult. ("last month") and inst. ("this month").
pulchrum est paucorum hominum	Beauty is for the few	from Friedrich Nietzsche's 1889 book Twilight of the Idols
pulvis et umbra sumus	we are dust and shadow	From Horace, Carmina Book IV, 7, 16.
punctum saliens	leaping point	Thus, the essential or most notable point. The salient point.
purificatus non consumptus	purified, not consumed	
