= Royal Australian Air Force Badge =

- Armiger: Royal Australian Air Force
- Adopted: 1939
- Crest: Tudor Crown
- Motto: Latin: Per Ardua ad Astra "Through Struggle to the Stars"

The Royal Australian Air Force Badge is the heraldic emblem used to represent the Royal Australian Air Force (RAAF). It features an Australian wedge-tailed eagle in flight superimposed on a circle, which is surmounted by the Tudor crown.

The RAAF states that the badge, similarly to the service's other emblems, represents the "Air Force’s people, values, history, and future." As of 19 October 1939, the badge was adopted for use throughout the service, with the Minister for Defence, Brigadier Geoffrey Street, giving his approval.

== Description and history ==
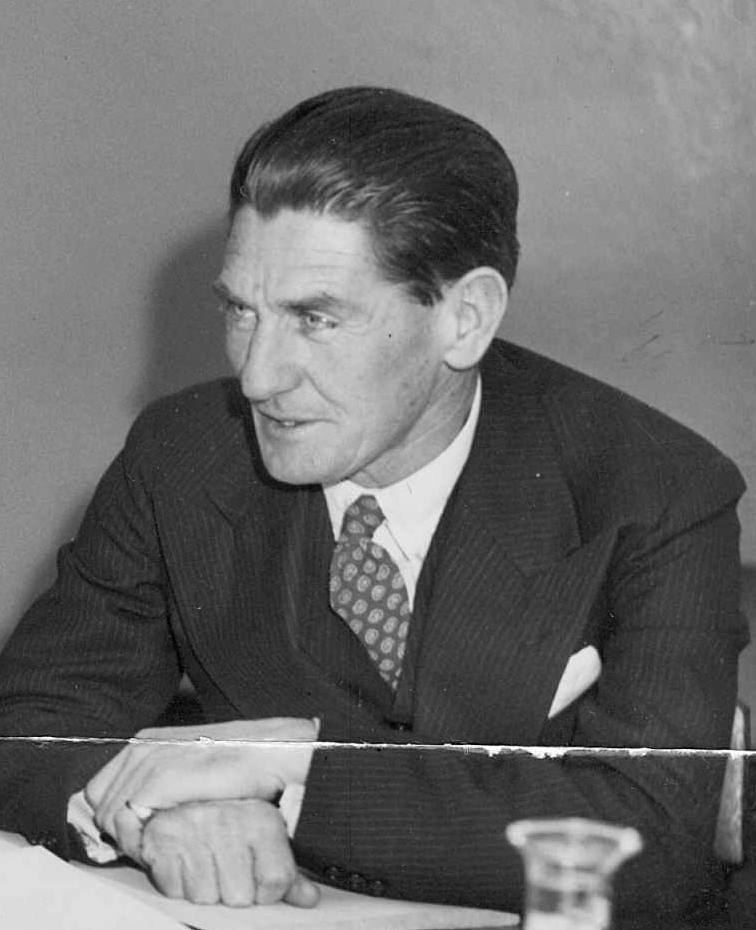
Minister for Defence Geoffrey Street approved the badge for use throughout the service in 1939

The Chester Herald, John Heaton-Armstrong, was "commissioned to prepare a badge for the RAAF" in 1937. Before its adoption, the badge was returned to London for alterations. The design was submitted to King George VI, who approved it.

The West Australian newspaper reported that, as of 19 October 1939, a "badge modelled on that of the Royal Air Force has been adopted for use throughout the Royal Australian Air Force." According to Minister for Defence Geoffrey Street, a "sprig of wattle" was "substituted for the sprig of laurel used by the R.A.F." and "on a scroll at the base" the badge featured the Latin motto: "Per ardua ad astra," with the translation given as: "through labour to the stars." On October 20th, the Melbourne Argus likewise reported on the badge, stating that the Minister for Defence had approved it for general use throughout the service. On 21 October 1939, the Sydney Morning Herald also discussed the new badge, printing a picture of the design and stating that the emblem had been approved by the king and would be "adopted throughout the R.A.A.F." The Herald also stated: "The Australian wedge-tail eagle has been substituted for the R.A.F. eagle."

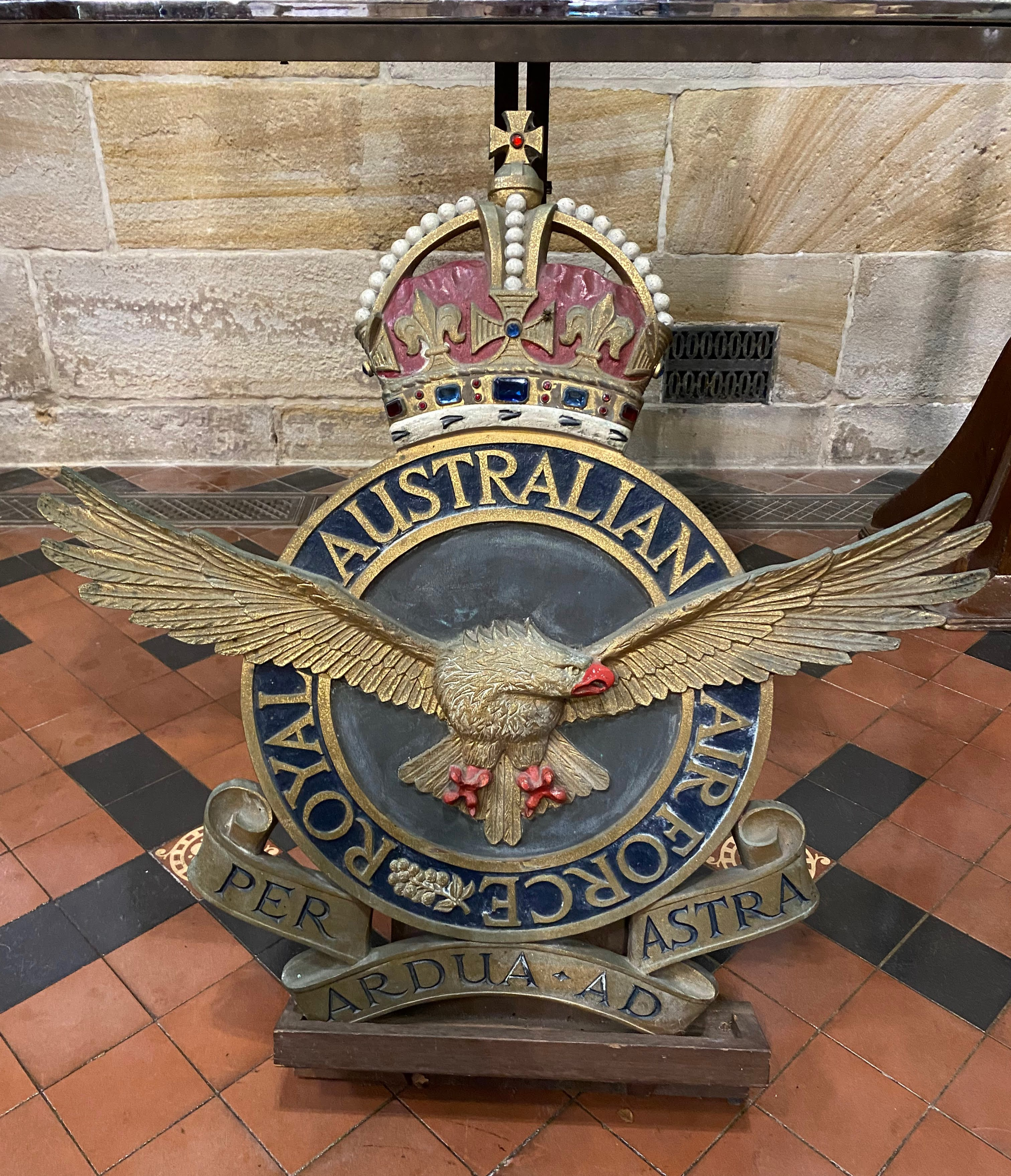
The badge displayed inside St. Andrew's Cathedral, Sydney

=== 21st-century history ===
In 2002, the Australian Chief of Air Force determined that "Through Struggle to the Stars" would be the official English rendering of the Latin motto. Following the accession of King Charles III, a version of the badge featuring the Tudor Crown, as "seen in King Charles III’s new cypher," was adopted in 2025 to replace Queen Elizabeth II’s St. Edward’s Crown design introduced in the 1950's. The Chief of Air Force, Air Marshal Stephen Chappell, "approved the new CIIIR pattern of the Royal Australian Air Force badge." The Air Force announced that the new design would be "introduced gradually, and generally only when equipment or uniforms which bear them needs to be replaced," similarly to what "happened in the 1950s and 1960s as Queen Elizabeth II's cypher" was first introduced. Other design corrections were also made, "including a new rendering of the national floral emblem – modelled on the Governor-General’s cypher – and a return to the monumental style of typeface used in the sovereign-approved badge of 1939."

== Gallery ==
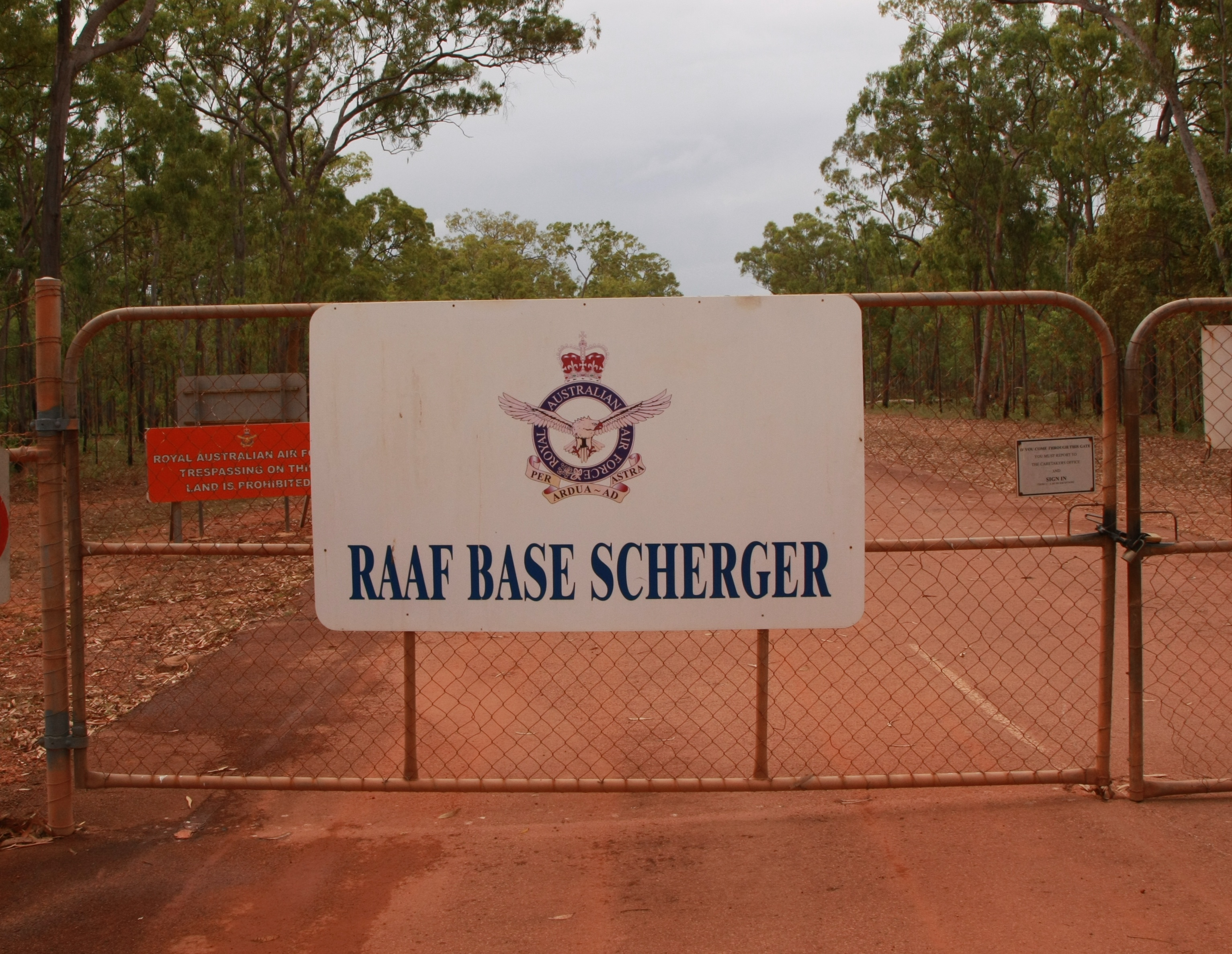
The badge displayed on a gate at RAAF Base Scherger, 2010

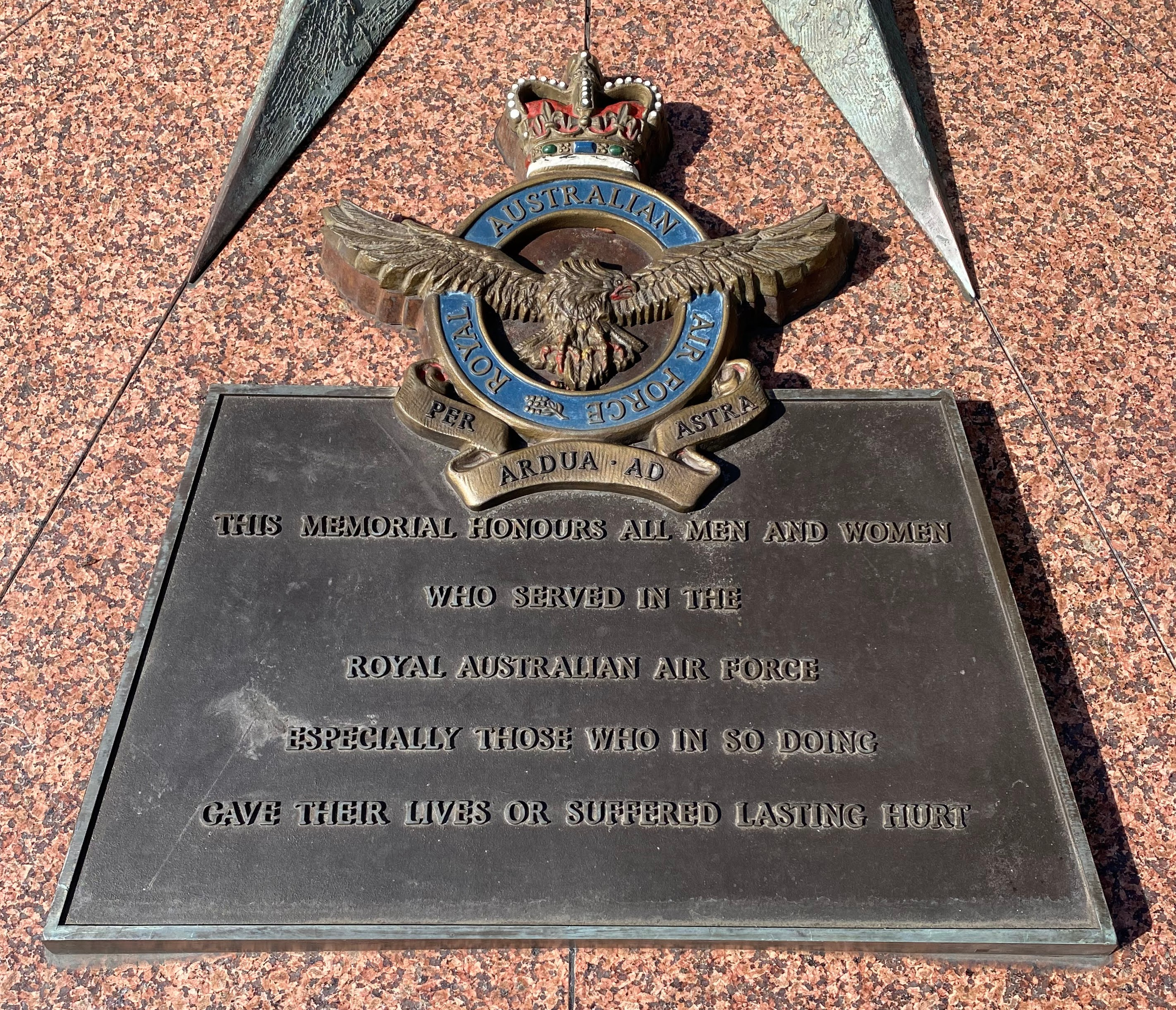
RAAF badge displayed on the Royal Australian Air Force Memorial in Brisbane

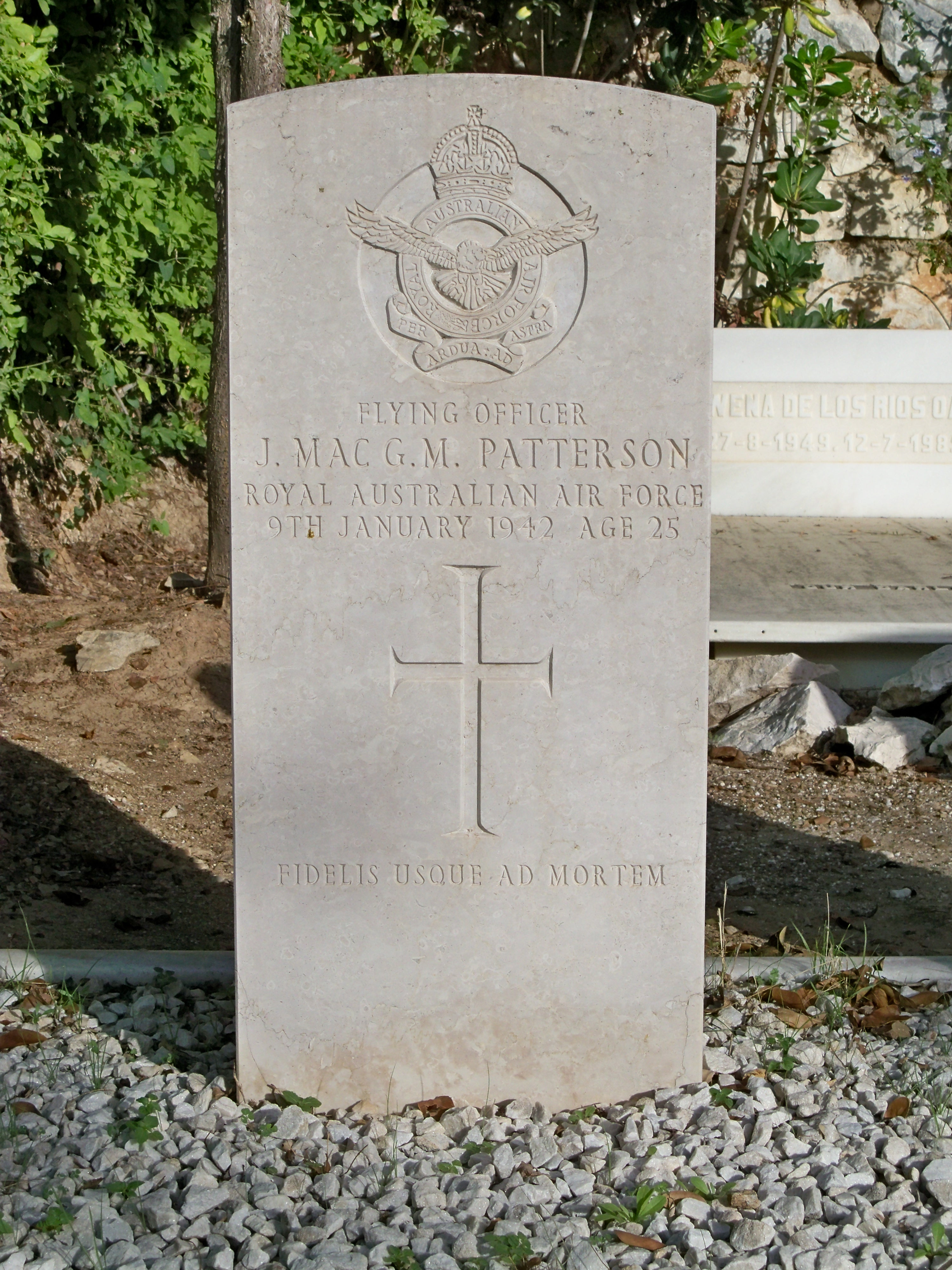
The badge on a Commonwealth war grave at the English Cemetery in Málaga, Spain

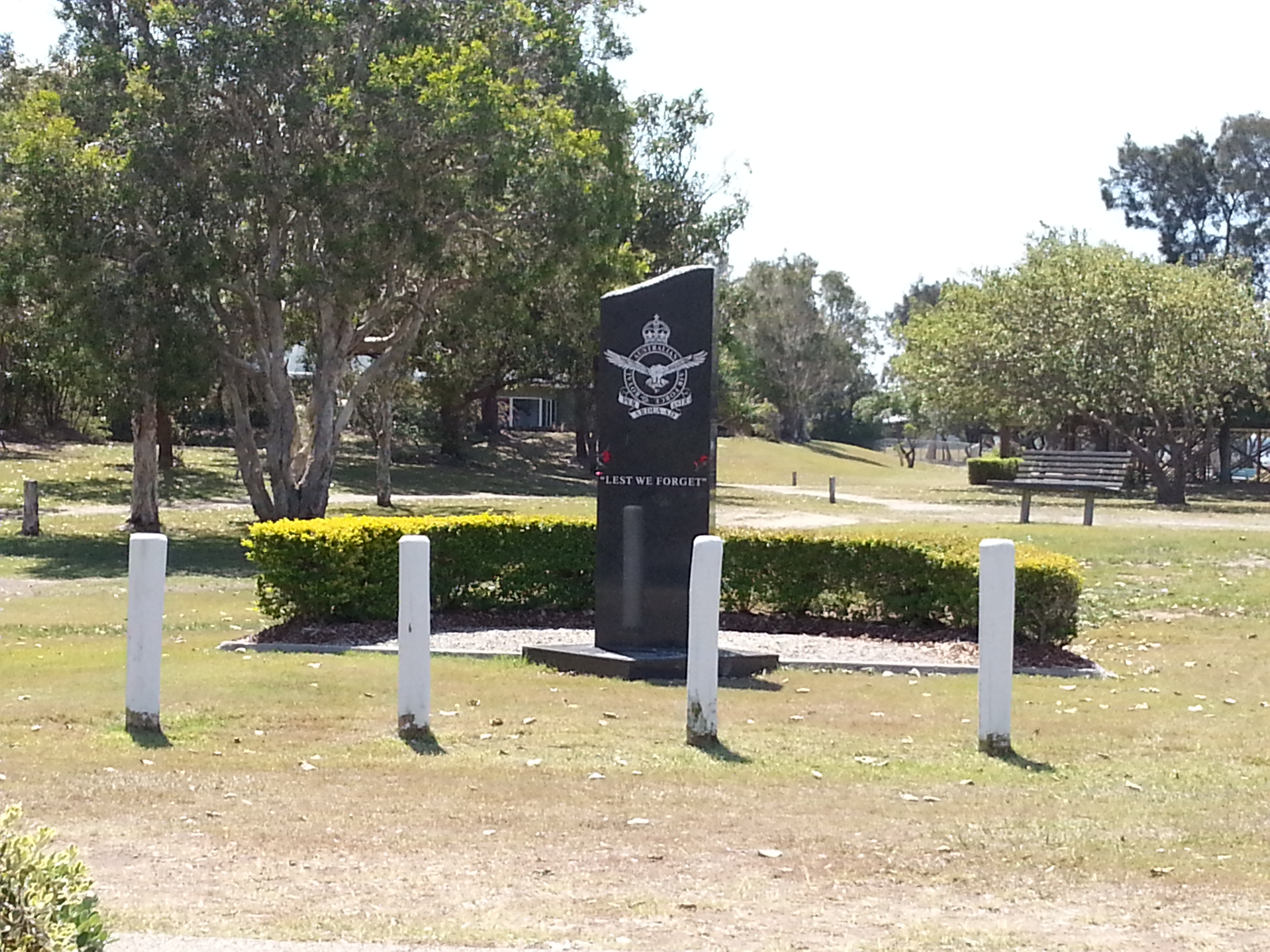
The badge on a memorial at the former RAAF Station Sandgate, 2012

== See also ==
- Royal Australian Air Force Ensign
- Badge of the Royal Air Force
- United States Air Force Symbol
