= Muldoon (disambiguation) =

Muldoon (Irish: Ó Maoldúin) is an Irish surname.

Muldoon may also refer to:

== People ==
- Solid Muldoon, a supposedly preserved prehistoric body, actually a hoax
- Sgt. Muldoon (pro-wrestler) ring name of John Callahan (wrestler)

== Places ==
- Muldoon, Anchorage, Alaska, USA; a major neighborhood in Anchorage
- Muldoon, Texas, USA
- Muldoon Park, Anchorage, Alaska, USA; a park
- Muldoon Park, Pelham, New Hampshire, USA; a town park
- Muldoon Canyon Formation, Idaho, USA

== Other uses ==
- Muldoon's, Mounds View, Minnesota, USA; a music venue
- James P. Muldoon River Center, Saint Mary's City, Maryland, USA; a marine biology lab
- Muldoon government (1974-1984) New Zealand national government led by Prime Minister Robert Muldoon

== See also ==
- Curse of Muldoon
