= Muldoon =

Muldoon (Irish: Ó Maoldúin) is an Irish family name. It is represented throughout the world where descendants of emigrants of people bearing that name have settled; e.g. U.S., Canada, Australia, New Zealand, South Africa and other countries.

Muldoon is an anglicisation of the Irish surname Ó Maoldúin, meaning "descendant of Maoldúin". The personal name Maolduin is composed of the elements "maol," meaning "chieftain," and "dún," meaning "fortress," or "chief of the fortress." Máel Dúin was one of the Kings from Mag Rath in Dál Riata, a Gaelic 'kingdom' that covered parts of north-eastern Ulster and south-western Scotland (see List of the kings of Dál Riata, Máel Dúin mac Conaill (died c. 689)).

According to The Surnames of Ireland by Edward MacLysaght, there are three distinct septs of Muldoon: Galway (around Uí Maine), Clare (whose names were generally Anglicised to Malone), and in Co. Fermanagh where the name is most common.

The family motto is Pro Fide Et Patria, Latin for "For Faith and Country".

== Notable Muldoons ==
- Bristow Muldoon, Scottish politician
- Enda Muldoon, Gaelic footballer
- Jack Muldoon, English footballer
- John Muldoon, Connacht Rugby Pro 12 winning captain
- Patrick Muldoon, American actor, film producer and musician
- Paul Muldoon, Northern Ireland poet
- Pete Muldoon, American ice hockey coach
- Rhys Muldoon, Australian actor
- Sir Robert Muldoon, Prime Minister of New Zealand from 1975 to 1984
- Royston Maldoom, choreographer
- Sylvan Muldoon, American writer
- William Muldoon, professional wrestler

== Fictional characters ==
- The Muldoon Family, fictional characters at the centre of Netflix's The Sinner, Season 4 (2022)
- Officer Francis Muldoon, a fictional character in the television show Car 54, Where Are You? and the movie of the same name
- Seamus Muldoon, fictional character in Survival of the Dead
- Robert Muldoon, a fictional character in the Jurassic Park series of novels and films
- Spotty Muldoon, a fictional character created by Peter Cook, and featured in his 1965 song The Ballad of Spotty Muldoon
- Stoat Muldoon, a fictional character in the animated series Butt-Ugly Martians
- Roberta Muldoon, a fictional character played by John Lithgow in The World According to Garp
- Skip Muldoon, a fictional character in the video game Hitman: Blood Money
- Jo Muldoon, a fictional character in the Lady Gregory play, Spreading the News
- Detective Muldoon, a fictional character in the 2020 film The Grudge
- Shane Muldoon, a fictional character in the TV series Longmire season five and six
- Cynthia Muldoon, a fictional character in the Tom Stoppard play The Real Inspector Hound, played by Caroline Blakiston in the premiere of the play

== Others ==
- Solid Muldoon, a supposedly preserved prehistoric body, actually a hoax

== See also ==
- Curse of Muldoon
- The Voyage of Máel Dúin
