= St. Mary's Seahawks =

- University: St. Mary's College of Maryland
- Conference: United East (most sports); MARC (rowing); MAISA (sailing)
- NCAA & ICSA: NCAA Division III
- Location: St. Mary's City, Maryland
- Varsity teams: 21 (10 men's, 11 women's)
- Basketball arena: Michael P. O'Brien Arena
- Baseball stadium: Hawk's Nest
- Soccer stadium: Jamie L. Roberts Stadium
- Aquatics center: The Aquatics Center
- Lacrosse stadium: Jamie L. Roberts Stadium
- Sailing venue: James P. Muldoon River Center
- Tennis venue: Somerset Complex
- Outdoor track and field venue: Jamie L. Roberts Stadium
- Volleyball arena: Michael P. O'Brien Arena
- Nickname: Seahawks
- Colors: Navy blue and Old gold
- Website: smcmathletics.com
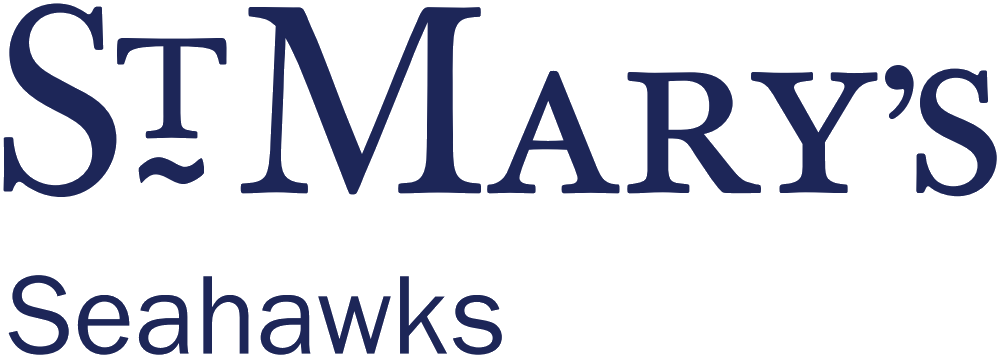

The St. Mary's Seahawks are the intercollegiate athletic teams of St. Mary's College of Maryland, located in St. Mary's City, Maryland, that they are members in the Division III ranks of the National Collegiate Athletic Association (NCAA), primarily competing in the United East Conference (UEC; known before July 2021 as the "North East Athletic Conference") for most of their sports since the 2021–22 academic year.; except for rowing, which they compete in the Mid-Atlantic Rowing Conference (MARC); and for sailing, which they compete in the Middle Atlantic Intercollegiate Sailing Association (MAISA) within the Inter-Collegiate Sailing Association (ICSA).

The Seahawks previously competed in the Coast to Coast Athletic Conference (C2C; known before November 2020 as the "Capital Athletic Conference") from 1989–90 to 2020–21.

St. Mary's College of Maryland has the highest percentage of student-athletes on the C2C All-Academic team for 6 years in a row.

== Varsity teams ==
The most recent additions are both men's and women's track and field, which the university decided in 2020 to add.

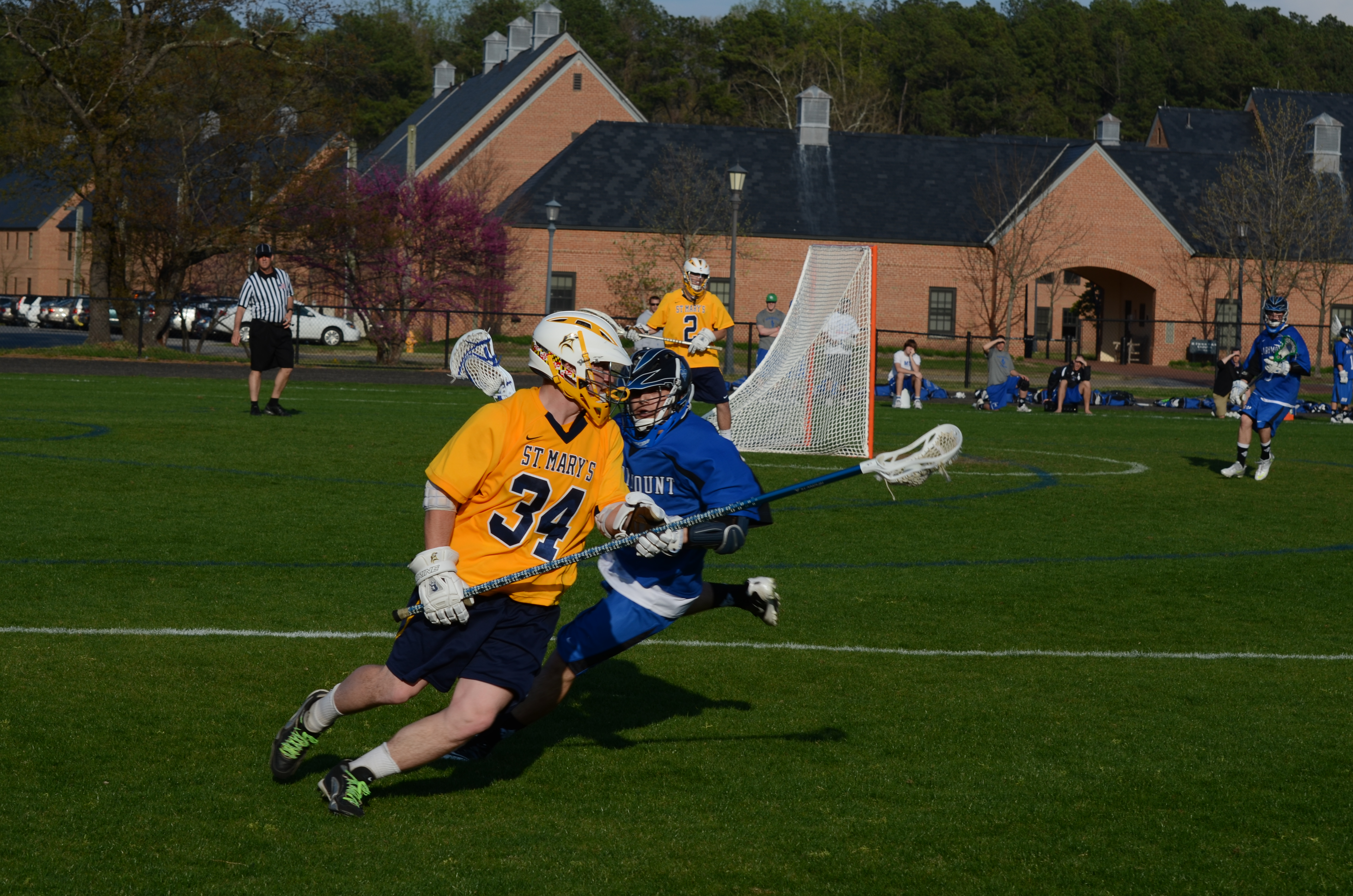
St. Mary's Seahawks varsity lacrosse player in motion.

Men's sports	Women's sports
Baseball	Basketball
Basketball	Cross country
Cross country	Field hockey
Lacrosse	Lacrosse
Rowing	Rowing
Sailing	Sailing
Soccer	Soccer
Swimming	Swimming
Tennis	Tennis
Track and field	Track and field
	Volleyball

=== Basketball ===
- 17 NCAA Division III athletic teams (9 in women's sports, 8 in men's sports).
- The St. Mary's College Men's basketball team has been a notable team since the 2007–08 season, winning the Capitol Athletic Conference title 5 times, and making 5 NCAA Division III tournament appearances, including reaching the Sweet 16 in 2008 and 2010, and the Elite 8 in 2011 and 2013.
- In the spring of 2008, St. Mary's Men's Basketball team was ranked 24th in the nation after making an appearance at the 2007–2008 NCAA Division III men's basketball tournament.

=== Sailing ===
St. Mary's College has three different sailing teams on campus, as well as a sailing club, and a windsurfing club. The Varsity Sailing Team and Offshore Sailing Team both compete in intercollegiate events around the country and occasionally in international regattas held in venues such as Europe. The Keelboat Sailing Team competes in racing events held by One Design or PHRF (Handicap) organizations in the Chesapeake Bay and other East Coast locations.

== Facilities ==
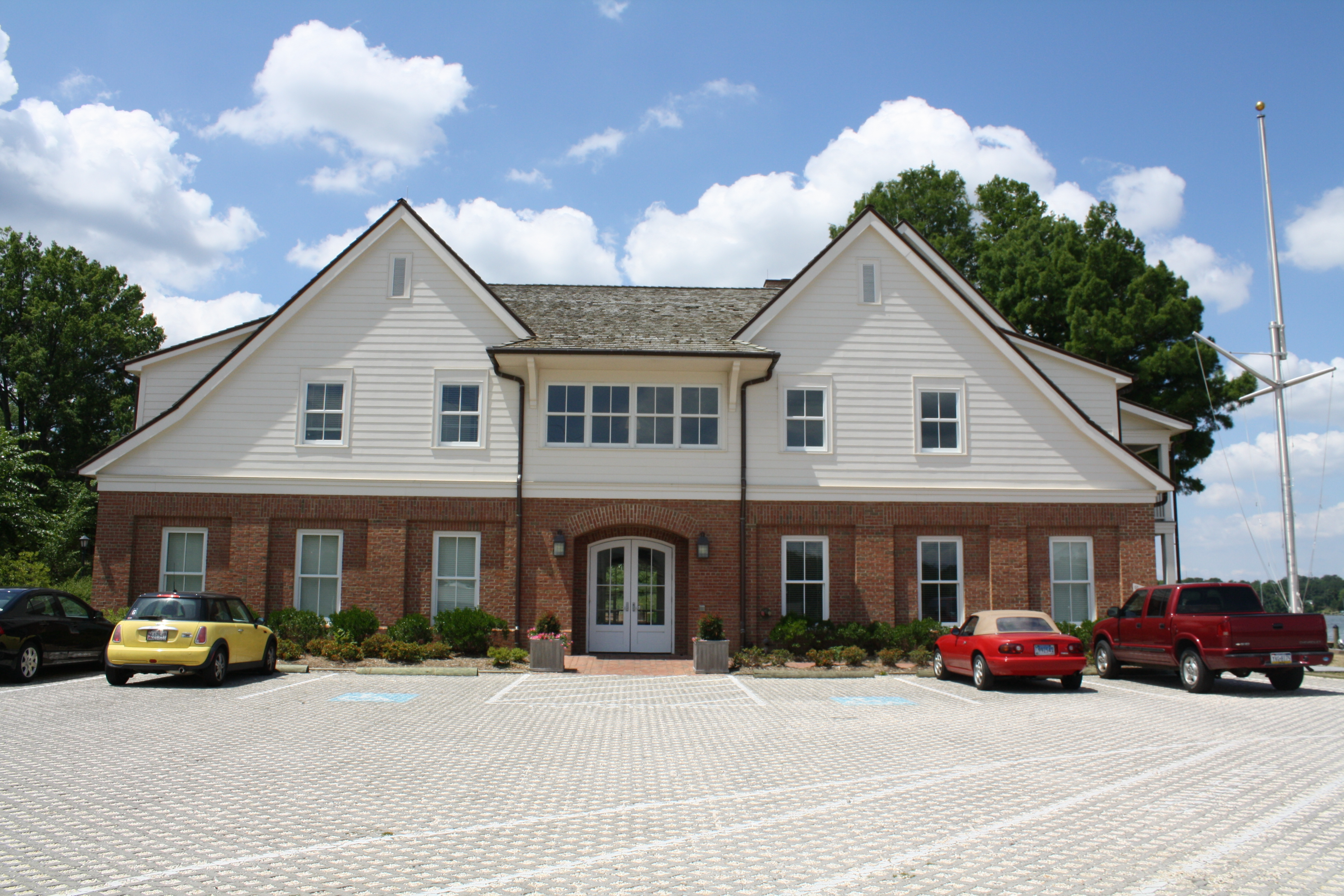
James P. Muldoon River Center

Venue	Sport(s)	Open.	Ref.
James P. Muldoon River Center	Sailing	2008	
Hawk's Nest	Baseball	2001	
Jamie L. Roberts Stadium	Soccer; Lacrosse; Track and field	2019	
Michael P. O'Brien Arena	Basketball; Volleyball	n/a	
Somerset Complex	Tennis	2001	
The Aquatics Center	Swimming	n/a	
