= Per quod =

Per quod is a Latin phrase (meaning whereby) used to illustrate that the existence of a thing or an idea is on the basis of external circumstances not explicitly known or stated.

== Legal example ==
"Statements are considered defamatory per quod if the defamatory character of the statement is not apparent on its face, and extrinsic facts are required to explain its defamatory meaning."

With defamation per quod, the plaintiff has to prove actual monetary and general damages, as compared to defamation per se where the special damages are presumed.
