= The People of the Mist =

1894 novel by H. Rider Haggard

- First edition
- Author: Sir H. Rider Haggard
- Illustrator: Arthur Layard
- Language: English
- Genre: Fantasy novel
- Publisher: Longman
- Publication date: 1894
- Publication place: United Kingdom
- Media type: Print (hardback), also available free from Amazon Kindle books.

The People of the Mist is a classic lost world fantasy novel written by H. Rider Haggard. It was first published serially in the weekly magazine Tit-Bits, between December 1893 and August 1894; the first edition in book form was published in London by Longman in October, 1894. It was reprinted in December, 1973 by Ballantine Books as the sixty-third paperback volume of the Ballantine Adult Fantasy series.

== Plot ==
The People of the Mist is the tale of a British adventurer seeking wealth in the wilds of Africa, finding romance, and discovering a lost race and its monstrous god.

The penniless Leonard Outram attempts to redress the undeserved loss of his family estates by seeking his fortune in Africa. In the course of his adventures, he and his Zulu companion Otter save a young English woman, Juanna Rodd, together with her nursemaid Soa, from slavery. Leonard and Juanna are plainly attracted to each other, but prone to bickering, and their romance is impeded by the watchful and jealous Soa. The protagonists seek the legendary People of the Mist, said to possess a fabulous hoard of jewels. On finding them, they immediately become embroiled in the turbulent political affairs of the lost race, which is driven by a power struggle between its king and the priests of its giant crocodile god. The heroic Outram can do little more than react to events. The action climaxes in a hair-raising escape by tobogganing a large flat stone down a steep glacier.

== Reception ==
Gary Westfahl described The People of the Mist as "Haggard's best African singleton...which effectively engages a reader's attention."

Lin Carter described the book as "a sensational adventure story which explores the dark heart of cryptic Africa, bringing to light a fantastic lost civilization from time's forgotten dawn . . . [Haggard] wrote it at the height of his powers, in the full glorious flush of his first successes, and it remains a highwater mark of the imaginative romance, seldom approached, rarely equalled, never surpassed. Yet its glory has been lost in the fame of the better publicized [of Haggard's] novels."

== Per ardua ad astra ==
The motto of the Royal Air Force and other Commonwealth air forces, first adopted a generation after publication, has been attributed to a passage from the book.

"To his right were two stately gates of iron fantastically wrought, supported by stone pillars on whose summit stood griffins of black marble embracing coats of arms and banners inscribed with the device 'Per Ardua ad Astra'.
