= James P. Muldoon River Center =

Sailing venue in Saint Mary's City, Maryland, US

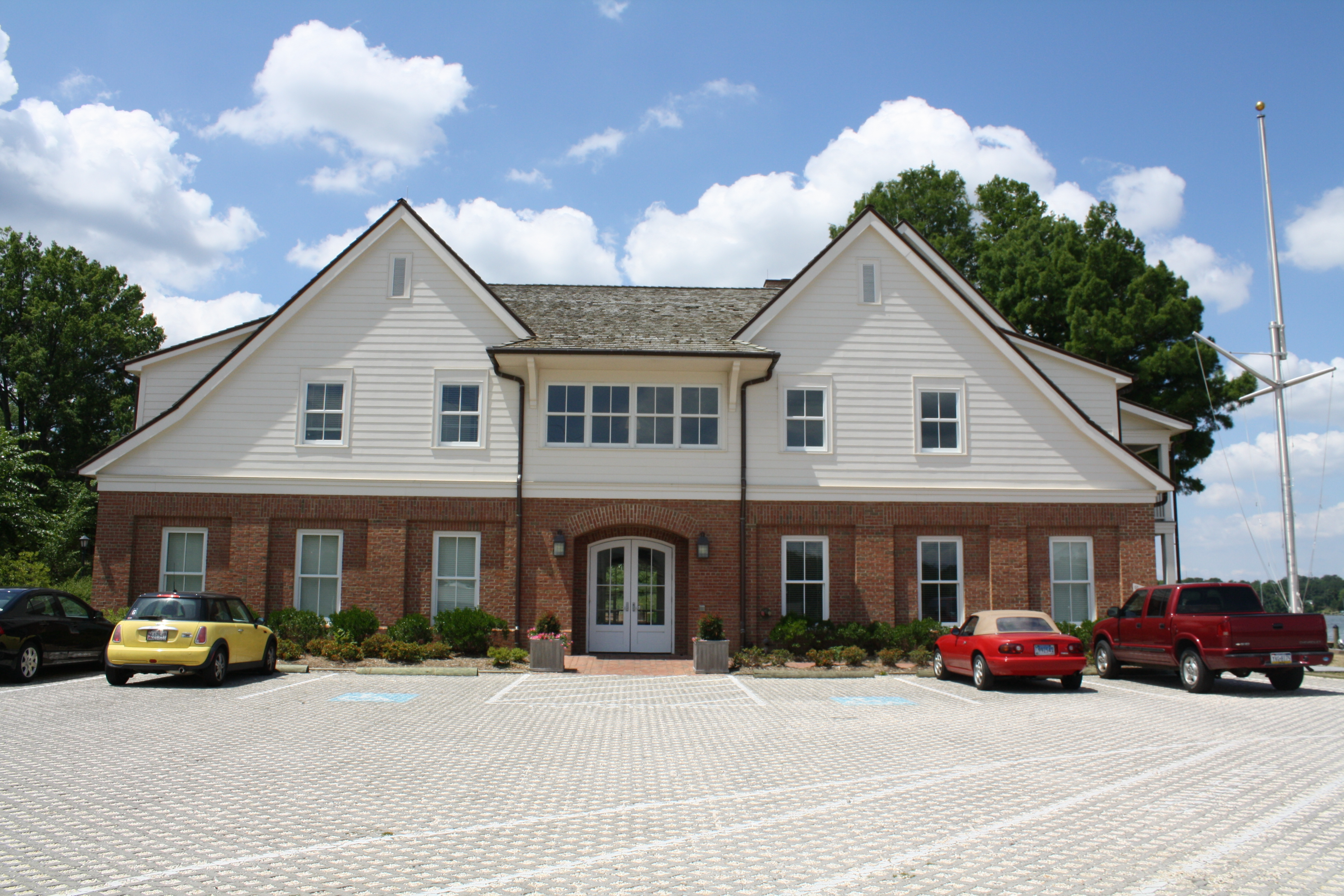
- Facility building in 2011
- Interactive map of James P. Muldoon River Center
- Location: Saint Mary's City, MD
- Coordinates: 38.1889°N 76.4329°W
- Owner: St. Mary's College of Maryland
- Operator: St. Mary's Athletics
- Type: Sailing venue
- Current use: Sailing

Construction
- Opened: 6 December 2008

Tenant
- St. Mary's Seahawks sailing

Website
- smcmathletics.com/river-center

The James P. Muldoon River Center, located in Saint Mary's City, Maryland, is a 13,000 square foot eco-friendly facility of the St. Mary's College of Maryland. The facility houses a marine biology laboratory classroom, a seminar room, boat repair facilities, a safety monitor station, water sports equipment storage, small locker rooms, offices for waterfront staff and biology faculty, a multi-purpose room, instructional space for water-based activities, and a deck that overlooks the waterfront basin and Horseshoe Bend on the St. Mary’s River. It is the home venue of the St. Mary's Seahawks sailing team.

== St. Mary's River Project ==
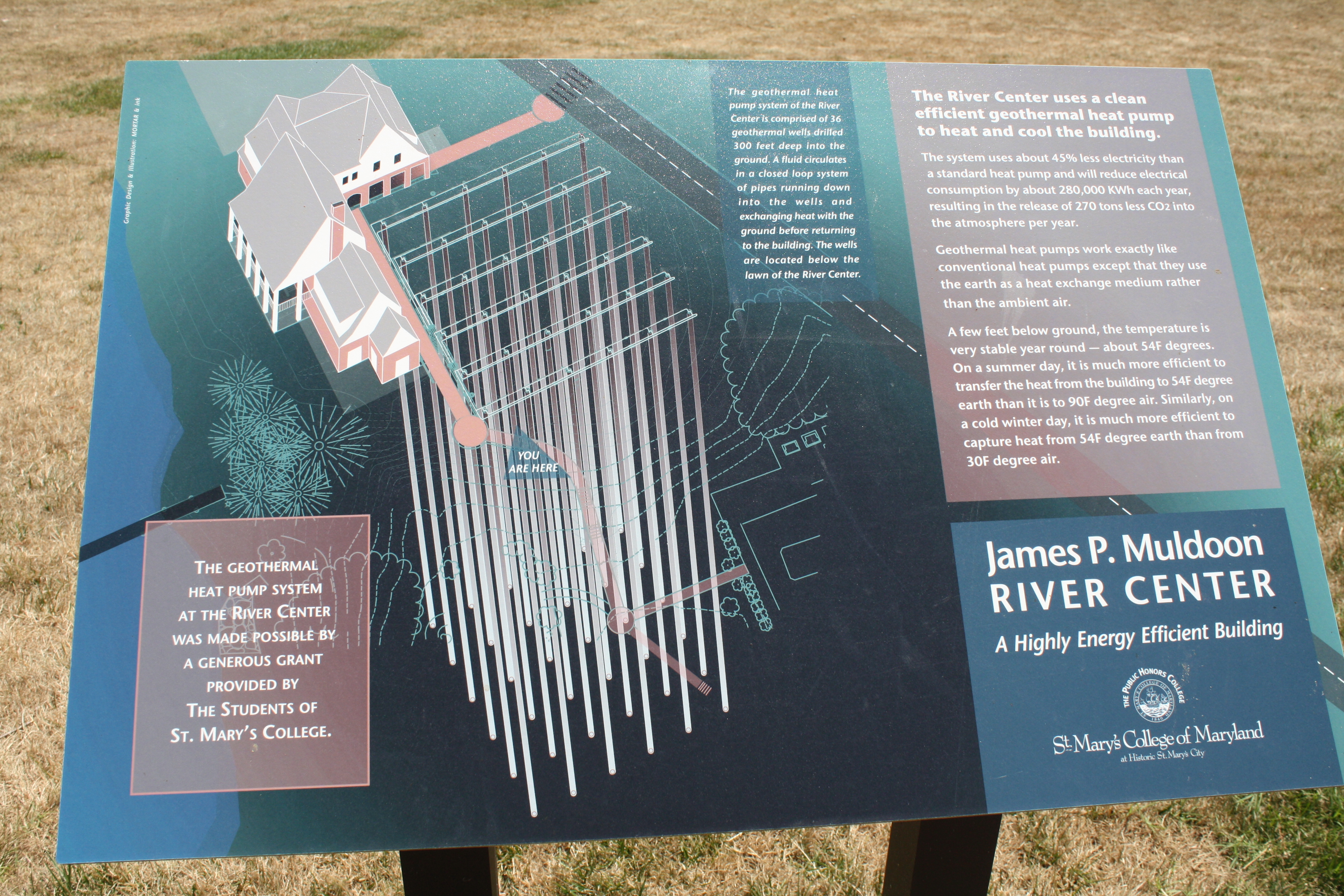
Display diagramming geothermal energy system underneath the Muldoon River Center on the campus of St. Mary's College of Maryland. The building houses marine biology labs and also the college sailing team.

The St. Mary's River Project, which is a part of the Muldoon River Center, is a state and federally funded marine biology research program, administered through St. Mary's College of Maryland.

Using the St. Mary's River and other nearby waters as field laboratories, the project investigates and monitors the water quality and the ecological health of both the St. Mary's River and the Chesapeake Bay. The project also promotes environment awareness and stewardship in Chesapeake Bay communities. Students work and study in all aspects of the programs activities, including classroom and hands-on field and laboratory learning.

The laboratories and offices of the project are located in the Muldoon River Center, a geothermally heated and cooled building on the campus waterfront.

=== Geothermal project at the Muldoon River Center ===
The Muldoon River Center has a geothermal heating and cooling system, with special pipes running 300 feet down into the ground, to tap the deep soil's energy management potential. The system cools the building in the summer and warms it in the wintertime with an extremely low impact on the environment.
