= History of the Royal Australian Air Force =

The Royal Australian Air Force (RAAF) traces its history back to the Imperial Conference held in London in 1911, where it was decided aviation should be developed within the Armed Forces of the British Empire. Australia implemented this decision, the only country to do so, by approving the establishment of the Central Flying School (CFS) in 1912. The location for the proposed school was initially to be at Duntroon, Australian Capital Territory, but in July 1913 Point Cook, Victoria, was announced as the preferred location. The first flights by CFS aircraft took place there in March 1914.

The Australian Flying Corps (AFC) was formed as a Militia unit, with staff and students to be selected from the Citizen Forces. After an abortive deployment to German New Guinea at the end of 1914 as part of the Australian Naval and Military Expeditionary Force, it earned a most creditable reputation in both Palestine and France during World War I as a part of the Australian Imperial Force (AIF). The Australian Flying Corps remained part of the Australian Army until 1919, when it was disbanded along with the AIF. Although the Central Flying School continued to operate at Point Cook, military flying virtually ceased until 1920, when the Australian Air Corps was formed. The Australian Air Force was formed on 31 March 1921. King George V approved the prefix "Royal" in June 1921 and it became effective on 31 August 1921. The RAAF then became the second Royal air arm to be formed in the British Commonwealth, following the British Royal Air Force.

The service was rapidly expanded during World War II and at its height, it was the fourth largest air force in the world, consisting of 53 squadrons based in the Pacific and a further 17 in Europe.

== Formation, 1912 ==
In 1911, the Imperial Conference that was held in London determined that the armed forces of the British Empire needed to develop an aviation branch. At the time, aircraft were a newly emerging technology, but nevertheless Australia implemented the decision, the only country to do so. The first step taken by the government was to approve the establishment of the Central Flying School (CFS) in 1912. Initially, it had been proposed to establish the school at Duntroon, in the Australian Capital Territory, where the Royal Military College had been established in 1911, but in July 1913 it was determined that Point Cook, Victoria, was the preferred location. The Australian Flying Corps (AFC) was subsequently formed as a Militia unit, with staff and students to be selected from the Citizen Forces, and the first flights by CFS aircraft took place in March 1914.

== World War I and the Inter-war years ==
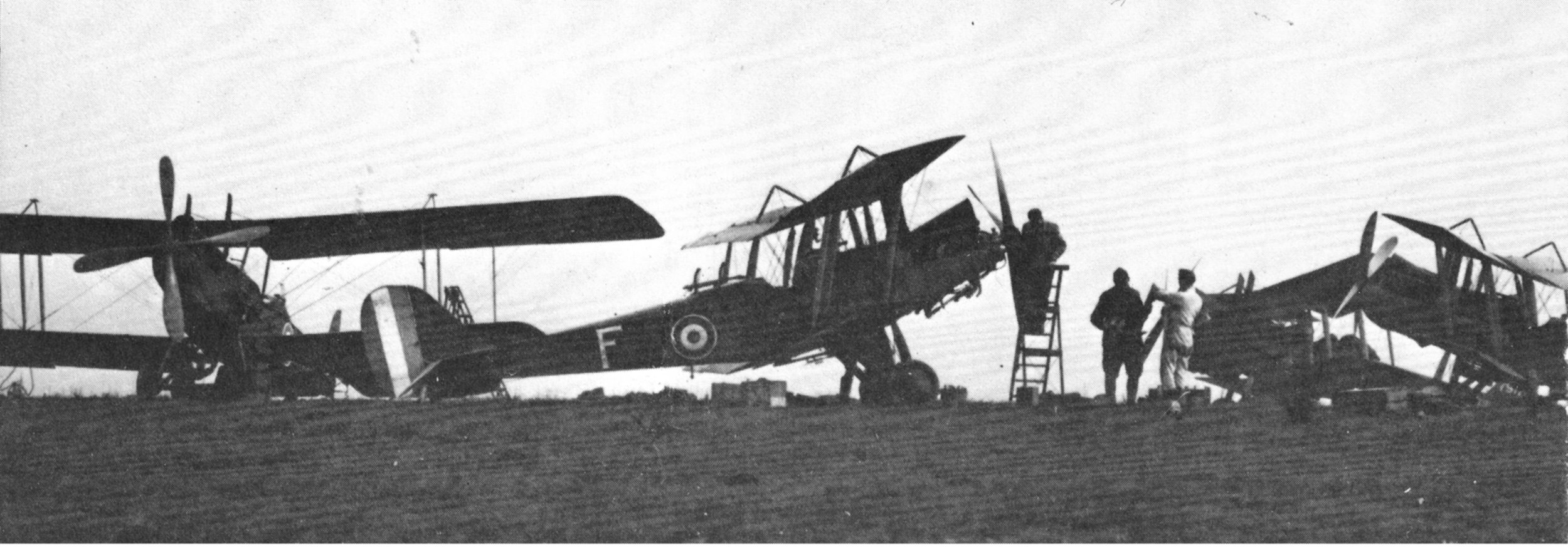
An Australian Flying Corps aircraft c. 1918

Soon after the outbreak of World War I in August 1914, the AFC sent aircraft to assist the Australian Naval and Military Expeditionary Force in capturing German colonies in what is now north-west New Guinea. These colonies surrendered quickly however, before the planes were even unpacked. The first operational flights did not occur until 27 May 1915, when the Mesopotamian Half Flight was called upon to assist the Indian Army in protecting British oil interests in what is now Iraq. The corps later saw action in Egypt, Palestine and on the Western Front throughout the remainder of World War I. By the end of the war, four squadrons – Nos. 1, 2, 3 and 4 – had seen active service; another four squadrons – Nos. 5, 6, 7, and 8 – had also been raised to provide training in the United Kingdom. The AFC was disbanded along with the rest of the Australian Imperial Force in 1919, following the end of hostilities. Although the Central Flying School continued to operate at Point Cook, military flying virtually ceased until 1920, when the Australian Air Corps was formed. The following year, this was separated from the Army on 31 March 1921, when the Australian Air Force was formed as an independent service; in May that year King George V gave his assent for the service to use the prefix "Royal" and this came into effect on 13 August 1921.

Upon formation, the RAAF had more aircraft than personnel, with 21 officers and 128 other ranks, and just 170 aircraft. Initially, it had been planned to expand the force to 1,500 personnel – three-quarters permanent staff and one quarter reserves – who would serve in six squadrons: two of fighter aircraft, two of reconnaissance aircraft, and two squadrons of seaplanes. These plans were scuttled a year after formation due to budget constraints and until 1924, the service's strength remained steady at just 50 officers and 300 other ranks; of the six planned squadrons, only five had been raised, albeit cadre strength, and these were subsequently merged into a single mixed squadron until 1925. A slightly improved economic situation in 1925 allowed the re-raising of Nos. 1 and 3 Squadrons, which were initially composite units equipped with fighters and bombers. Later in the decade, they were reorganised with No. 1 Squadron becoming a solely bomber formation, while No. 3 focused on army co-operation roles; smaller squadrons – in reality only flights – of fighters and seaplanes were formed within the RAAF's flying training unit, No. 1 Flying Training School, which had been raised at Point Cook.

Throughout the inter-war years the fledgling RAAF focused on local defence and providing training opportunities to Australia's naval and military forces. It also undertook aerial survey missions, meteorological flights, public displays, and provision of defence aid to the civil community, undertaking search and rescue missions and bush fire patrols. In the late 1930s, the force was expanded amidst concerns about a future war in Europe. Additional squadrons were raised and bases established away from the south-east coast, including airbases in Western Australia, Queensland and the Northern Territory. This expansion saw the RAAF increase its personnel from under 1,000 in 1935 to around 3,500 in 1939, and the establishment of a force of 12 squadrons, with plans for a further six, by the outbreak of World War II in September 1939.

== World War II ==
Shortly after the declaration of war in Europe, although Australia's air force was small – consisting of just 246 aircraft – the Australian government offered to send six squadrons to Britain to fight, in addition to the 450 Australians who were already serving in the ranks of the Royal Air Force at the time. The RAAF already had one squadron in the United Kingdom, No. 10 Squadron RAAF, which had been dispatched earlier in the year to take ownership of nine Short Sunderland flying boats and return them to Australia. They subsequently took place in their first operational mission on 10 October 1939, when they carried out a sortie to Tunisia. To rapidly expand, Australia joined the Empire Air Training Scheme, under which flight crews received basic training in Australia before travelling to Canada or Rhodesia for advanced training. These crews were then posted to operational units. A total of 17 RAAF bomber, fighter, reconnaissance and other squadrons served initially in Britain, and/or with the Desert Air Force, in North Africa and the Mediterranean.

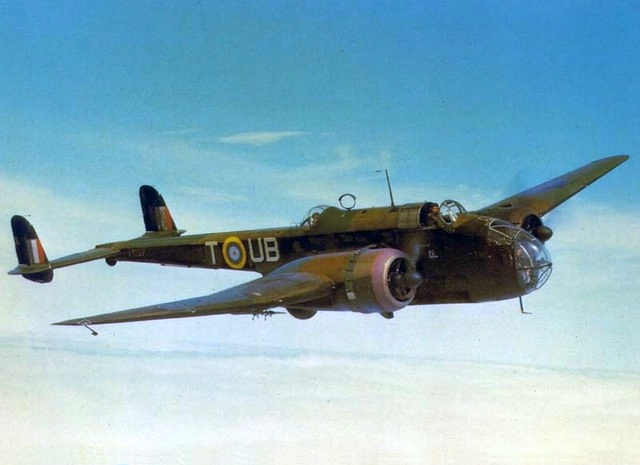
An Australian Hampden from No. 455 Squadron RAAF at RAF Leuchars in May 1942.

With British manufacturing targeted by the Luftwaffe, the Australian government created the Department of Aircraft Production (DAP), which was later known as the Government Aircraft Factories, to supply Commonwealth air forces and the RAAF was eventually provided with large numbers of locally-built versions of British designs like the Beaufort torpedo bomber.

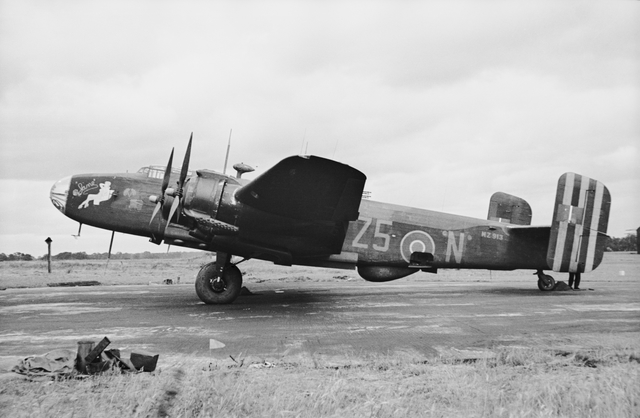
An Australian Halifax from No. 462 Squadron RAAF at RAF Foulsham in 1945.

In the European Theatre of World War II, RAAF personnel were especially notable in RAF Bomber Command: although they represented only two percent of all RAAF personnel during the war, they accounted for 23% of the total number killed in action. This statistic is further illustrated by the fact that No. 460 Squadron RAAF, mostly flying Avro Lancasters, had an official establishment of about 200 aircrew and yet had 1,018 combat deaths. The squadron was therefore effectively wiped out five times over.

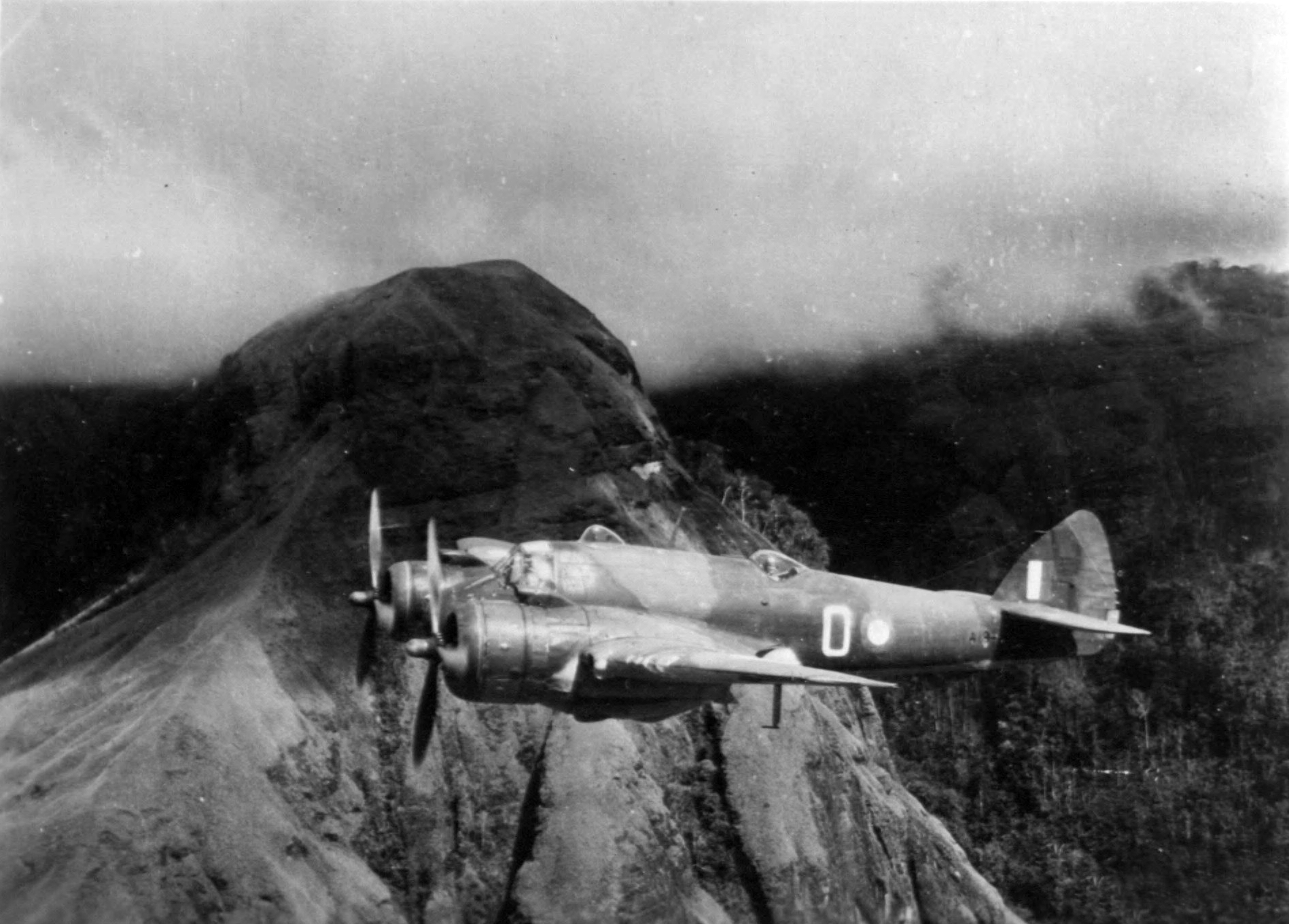
An Australian Beaufighter flying over the Owen Stanley Range in New Guinea in 1942

The beginning of the Pacific War—and the rapid advance of Japanese forces—threatened the Australian mainland for the first time. The RAAF was quite unprepared for the emergency, and initially had negligible forces available for service in the Pacific. Its four squadrons based in Malaya – Nos. 1, 8, 21 and 453 – equipped with a mixture of Hudsons, Wirraways and Buffalos, were the first to go into combat, but they suffered heavily against Japanese during the Malayan Campaign and the subsequent fighting on Singapore, highlighting the fact that the Japanese held the upper hand in the air. The devastating air raids on Darwin on 19 February 1942 – launched from four aircraft carriers stationed in the Timor Sea – drove the point home. Defended by a small force of just 18 Wirraways and 14 Hudsons from two squadrons – Nos. 12 and 13 – the town was heavily damaged with the loss of 10 ships, 23 aircraft and a death toll of several hundred. The British Air Ministry transferred two RAAF fighter squadrons, No. 452 Squadron and No. 457 Squadron, along with No. 54 Squadron RAF, from Britain to Australia for the defence of Darwin. The other 15 squadrons remained in the northern hemisphere until the end of the war. Shortages of fighter and ground attack planes led to the acquisition of US-built P-40 Kittyhawks, and the rapid design and manufacture of the first Australian fighter, the CAC Boomerang. RAAF Kittyhawks, such as those operated by Nos. 75, 76 and 77 Squadrons, came to play a crucial role in the New Guinea and Solomon Islands campaigns, especially in the Battle of Milne Bay and in the Kokoda Track campaign.

In the Battle of the Bismarck Sea, imported Bristol Beaufighters proved to be highly effective ground attack and maritime strike aircraft. Beaufighters were later made locally by the DAP. Although it was much bigger than Japanese fighters, the Beaufighter had the speed to outrun them. The RAAF's heavy bomber force predominantly comprised 287 B-24 Liberators, which could bomb Japanese targets as far away as Borneo and the Philippines from airfields in Australia and New Guinea.

In September 1942 most Australian squadrons were grouped under RAAF Command. The only Australian air combat units in the SWPA not under RAAF Command were those based in New Guinea as No. 9 Operational Group RAAF, which was controlled by Fifth Air Force. RAAF Command was charged with defending Australia, except in the north-east, protecting the sea lanes to New Guinea, and conducting operations against Japanese shipping, airfields and other installations in the Dutch East Indies. Its role was thus "mainly defensive" at the outset, with the expectation that "in the event of developments in the North and North-West of Australia, this would be altered". Bostock was to exercise control of air operations through the RAAF area command system, comprising North-Western, Western, Southern, Eastern, and North-Eastern Area Commands.

By late 1945, the RAAF had received or ordered about 500 P-51 Mustangs, for fighter/ground attack purposes. The Commonwealth Aircraft Corporation initially assembled US-made Mustangs, but later manufactured most of those used. The RAAF's main operational formation, the First Tactical Air Force, comprised more than 18,000 personnel and 20 squadrons; it had taken part in the Philippines and Borneo campaigns and was scheduled to participate in the invasion of the Japanese mainland, Operation Downfall. So too were the RAAF bomber squadrons in Europe, as part of the proposed Tiger Force. However, the war was brought to a sudden end by the US nuclear attacks on Japan. As a result of the Empire Air Training Scheme, about 20,000 Australian personnel had served with other Commonwealth air forces in Europe during World War II. A total of 216,900 men and women served in the RAAF, of whom 9,780 lost their lives. At war's end, a total of 53 RAAF squadrons were serving in the Pacific and a further 17 in Europe. With over 152,000 personnel operating nearly 6,000 aircraft it was the world's fourth largest air force, after those of the USA, the USSR and the UK.

== Post-World War II service ==
=== Korean War ===
Two F/A-18 Hornets and ground crew from No.75 Squadron in the Middle East during 2003.

In the Korean War, Mustangs from No. 77 Squadron (77 Sqn), stationed in Japan with the British Commonwealth Occupation Force, were among the first United Nations aircraft to be deployed, in ground support, combat air patrol, and escort missions. When the UN planes were confronted by MiG-15 jet fighters, 77 Sqn acquired Gloster Meteors, which enabled some success against the Soviet pilots flying for North Korea. However, the MiGs were superior aircraft and the Meteors were relegated to ground support missions, as the North Koreans gained experience. The air force also operated transport aircraft during the conflict.

=== Vietnam War ===
During the Vietnam War, from 1966–1972, the RAAF contributed squadrons of Caribou STOL transport aircraft (No. 35 Squadron), UH-1 Iroquois helicopters (No. 9 Squadron) and English Electric Canberra bombers (No. 2 Squadron).

The Canberras flew a large number of bombing sorties, two were lost (in 1970 and 1971). Two crew members were killed, two squadron members died of disease, and three from accidents during the war. One of the Canberras lost (A84-228) was brought down by a surface-to-air missile from which the crew (including the squadron commander, W/C Frank Downing) safely ejected and were rescued by helicopter. The other (A84-231) was lost near Da Nang, during a bombing run. Its exact location and fate of its crew (FlgOff. Michael Herbert and Plt Off. Robert Carver) were unknown for 28 years, when it was located and their remains were returned to Australia.)

RAAF transport aircraft also supported anti-communist ground forces. The UH-1 helicopters were used in many roles including Dustoff (medical evacuation) and Bushranger Gunships for armed support.

=== Peacekeeping and Iraq ===
Military airlifts were conducted for a number of purposes in the intervening decades, such as the peacekeeping operations in East Timor from 1999. Australia's combat aircraft were not used again in anger until the Iraq War in 2003, when F/A-18s from No. 75 Squadron operated in the escort and ground attack roles.

== See also ==
- G for George
