= Pax Indica: India and the World of the Twenty-first Century =

2012 non-fiction book by Shashi Tharoor

- Author: Shashi Tharoor
- Language: English
- Subject: Foreign relations of India
- Publisher: Penguin Books India
- Publication date: 3 July 2012
- Publication place: India
- Media type: eBook
- Pages: 455
- ISBN: 978-8-184-75693-7

Pax Indica: India and the World of the Twenty-first Century is a 2012 non-fiction book written by Shashi Tharoor that discusses India's foreign policy.

== Summary ==
Tharoor emphasizes the significance and impact of globalization for India's society, and states that the primary objective of India's foreign policy must be to protect the process of domestic, social and economic transformation, by working for a benign environment that will ensure India's security and bring in global support for efforts to build and change the country for the better.

In the first seven chapters, he analyzes the geopolitical situation of various regions of the world, including Pakistan, South Asia, China, the Middle East, the West, Africa, and Latin America. The bulk of it consists of a brief history of India's relationship with that country, and numerous conflicts, disputes, and solutions are discussed.

In the last four chapters, he gives his recommendations. The concepts of 'soft power' and 'hard power' are talked about, and he weighs in the pros and cons of these two ways of influencing foreign policy and diplomacy. A fan of soft power, he believes that India should use a combination of soft power and public diplomacy in this multi aligned world to achieve her objectives.

== Reception ==
In a review of the book, Aditya Menon stated in the weekly Indian English-language news magazine India Today magazine that "...Pax Indica promises to be a seminal work on Indian diplomacy" and that "Tharoor covers almost every possible aspect of the foreign policy challenges before the country in the 21st century", providing insights on "India's relations with the US, Pakistan, the UN". However, he does not treat India's relations with Iran and China in depth. In this lively and informative work, Shashi Tharoor demonstrates how Indian diplomacy has become active and where it needs to focus in the world of the 21st century.

People Matters stated "Pax Indica, makes an earnest attempt to take foreign policy thinking to the masses instead of leaving it to bureaucrats or strategic elites."
