= Per ardua ad astra =

Motto of the Royal Air Force and several other air forces

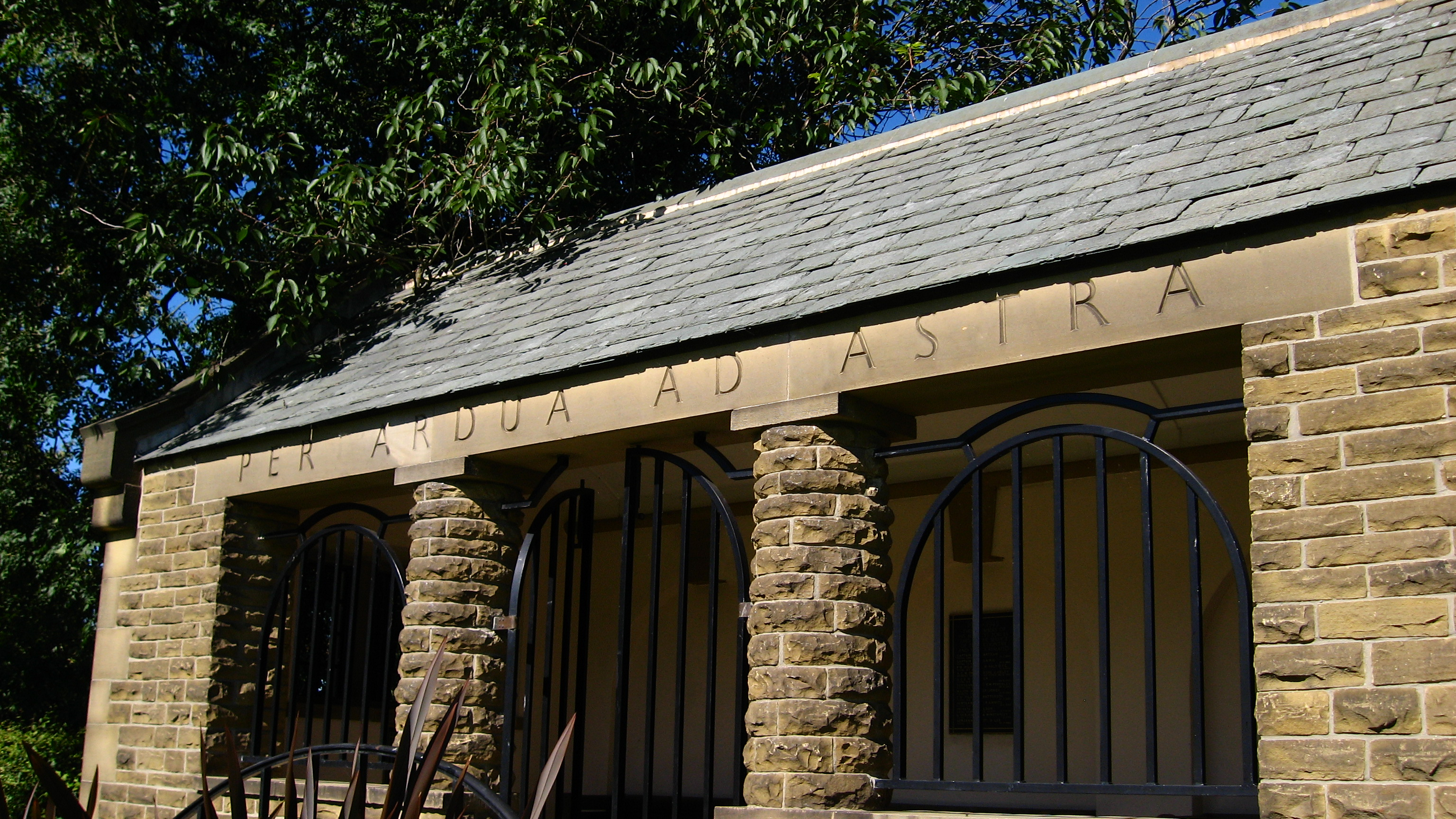
The motto carved into the shelter at Stonefall cemetery in Harrogate, which has Air Force graves from many Commonwealth air forces

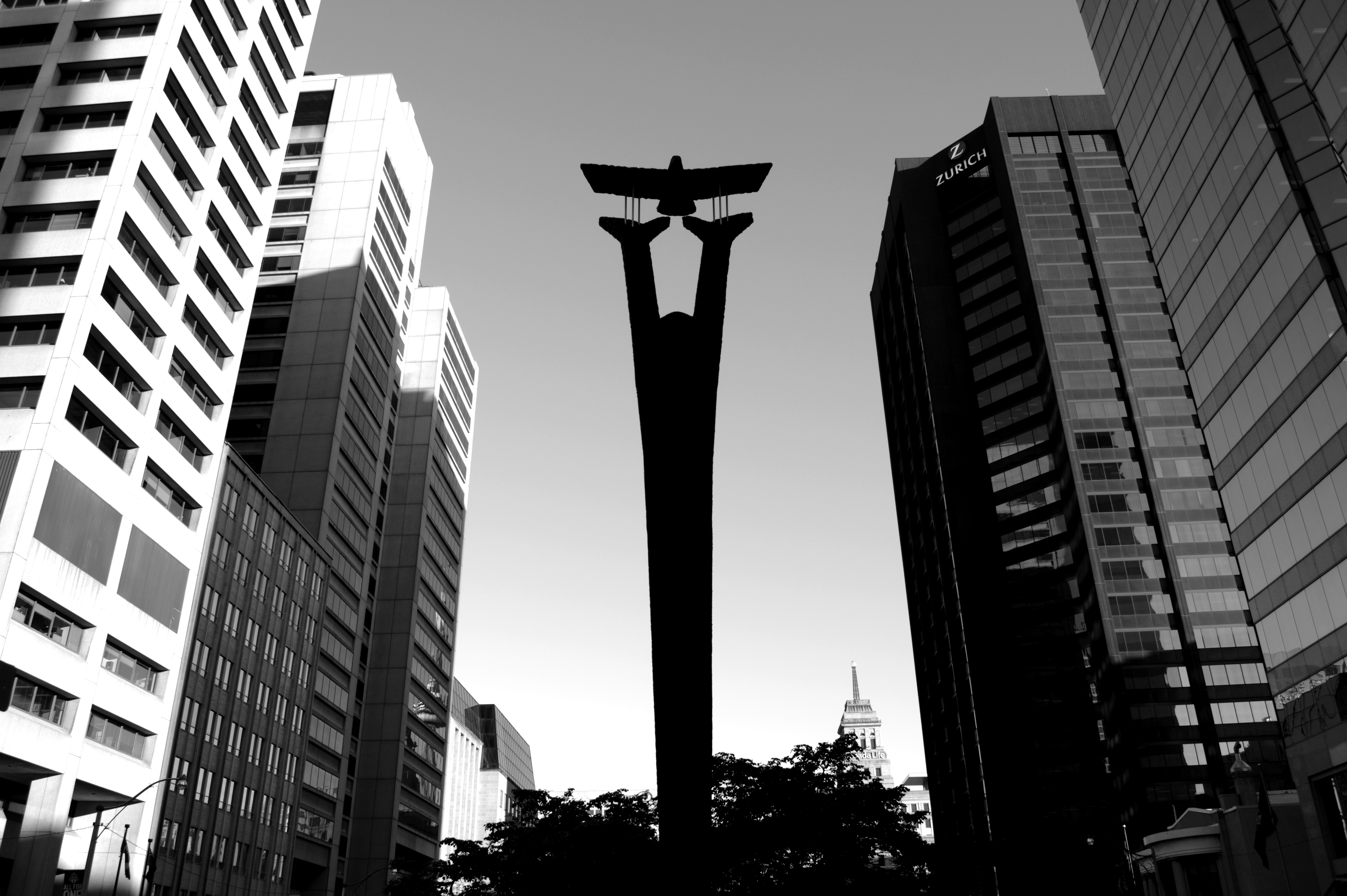
Per Ardua Ad Astra, a 1984 memorial sculpture by Oscar Nemon on University Avenue in Toronto, honouring fallen Canadian airmen and women

Per ardua ad astra is a Latin phrase meaning "through adversity to the stars" or "through struggle to the stars" that is the official motto of the Royal Air Force and other Commonwealth air forces such as the Royal Australian Air Force and Royal New Zealand Air Force, as well as the Royal Indian Air Force until 1947. The Royal Canadian Air Force used it until 1968, when it adopted the motto sic itur ad astra, a similar phrase meaning "such is the pathway to the stars". It dates from 1912, when it was adopted by the newly formed Royal Flying Corps.

== Origin ==
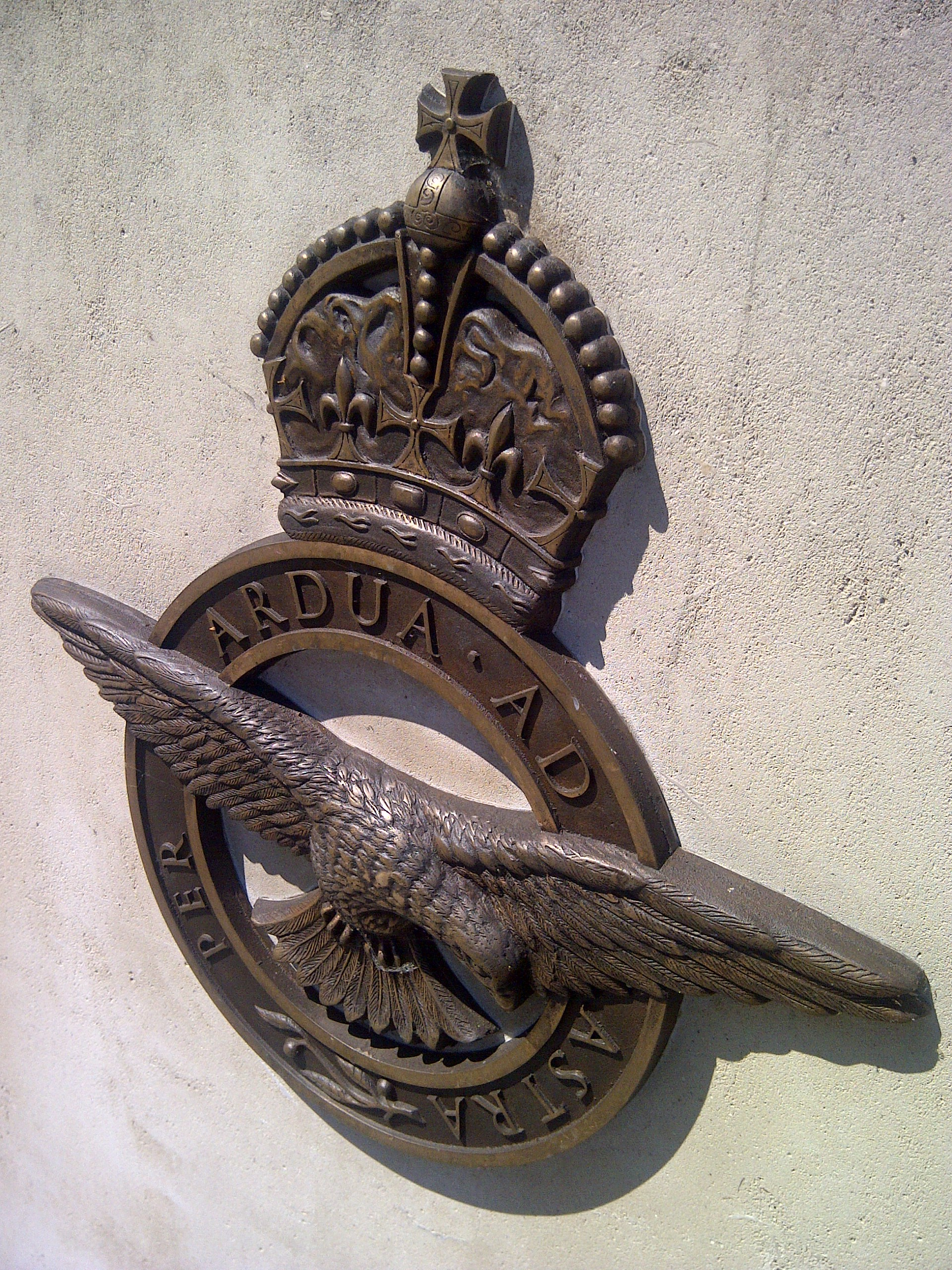
Per ardua ad astra badge on the Polish Air Force Memorial, London

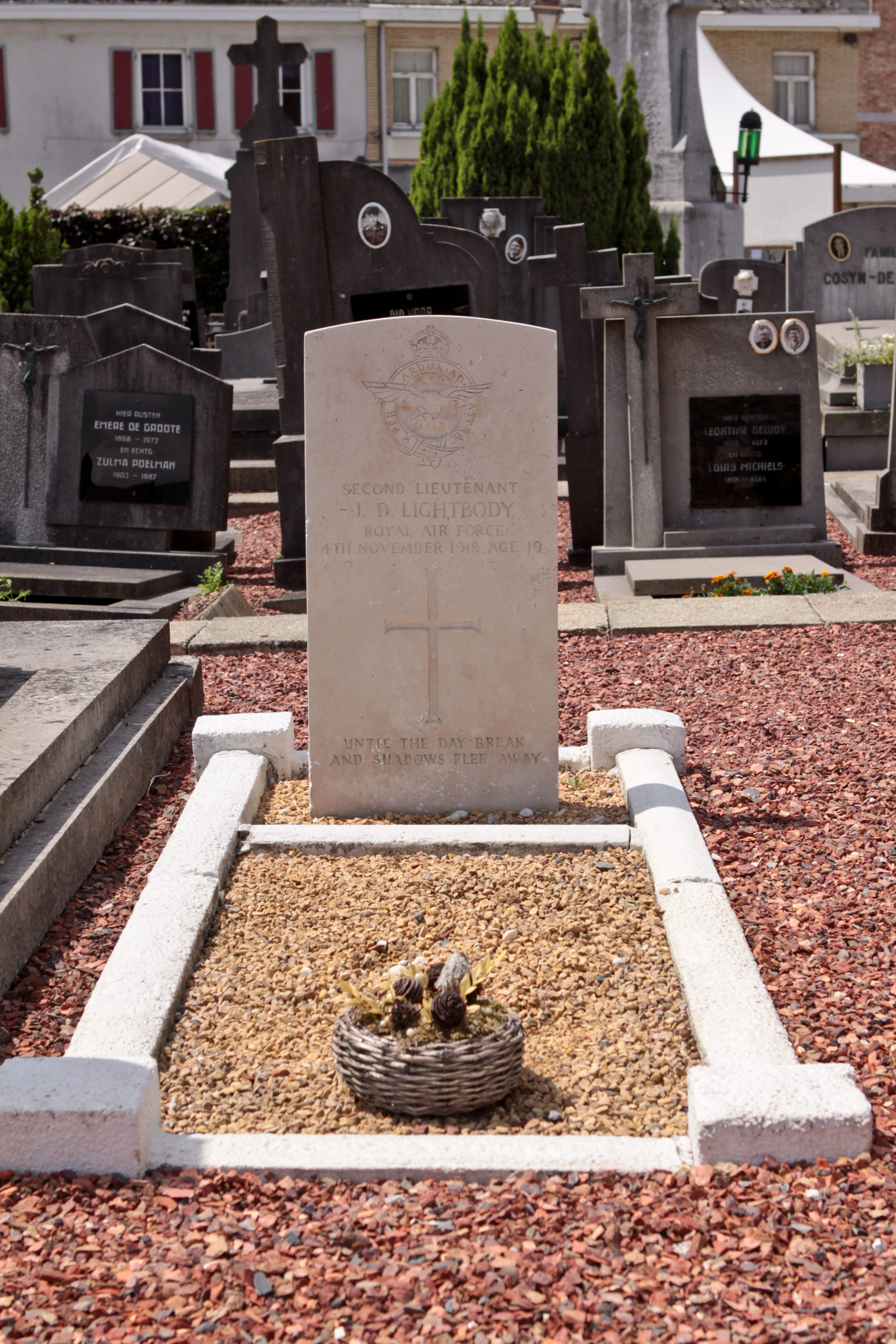
RAF badge on the 1918 headstone of Lieutenant J. D. Lightbody in Scheldewindeke, Belgium

The first commanding officer of the Royal Flying Corps (Military Wing) was Colonel Frederick Sykes. He asked his officers to come up with a motto for the new service; one which would produce a strong esprit de corps.

Not long after this, two junior officers were walking from the Officers' Mess at Farnborough to Cody's Shed on Laffan Plain. As they walked they discussed the problem of the motto and one of them, Lieutenant J. S. Yule, mentioned the phrase Sic itur ad Astra, from Virgil. He then expanded on this with the phrase Per Ardua ad Astra, which he translated as, "Through Struggles to the Stars". Colonel Sykes approved of this as the motto and forwarded it to the War Office. It was then submitted to King George V, who approved its adoption.

Yule is believed to have borrowed the phrase from Sir Henry Rider Haggard's fantasy novel The People of the Mist (1894). The first chapter includes the sentence: "To his right were two stately gates of iron fantastically wrought, supported by stone pillars on whose summit stood griffins of black marble embracing coats of arms and banners inscribed with the device 'Per Ardua ad Astra'". It is possible that Rider Haggard had taken it from the Irish family of Mulvany, who had used it as their family motto for centuries, translating it as "Through Struggles to the Stars".

There is no single definitive translation, as both "ardua" and "astra" can carry a range of associations. The Royal Air Force and other Commonwealth air forces most often translate it as "Through Adversity to the Stars".

== Variants ==
The motto of the Royal Air Force Regiment omits the ad astra part, becoming simply per ardua. Conversely, the name of the building that originally housed the Air Ministry became Adastral House, based only on 'ad astra. The Royal Canadian Air Force and other entities including the Colombian Air Force use the similar motto sic itur ad astra, and the South African Air Force uses per aspera ad astra.

== See also ==
- Per aspera ad astra, a motto with a similar translation
- Ad astra (phrase), other similar phrases
