= Solid Muldoon =

Supposedly preserved prehistoric body, actually a hoax

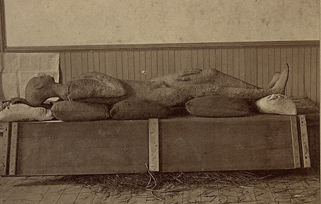
The Solid Muldoon

The Solid Muldoon was a supposedly prehistoric "petrified human body" unearthed in 1877, at a spot now known as Muldoon Hill, near Beulah, Colorado. The figure enjoyed a brief tour of the United States before it was revealed to be a hoax. It was said to have been named after wrestler William Muldoon, whose nickname was "The Solid Man". This nickname was itself a reference to a comic song called "Muldoon, the Solid Man", written by Edward Harrigan.

== History ==
The Solid Muldoon was created by George Hull in 1877, seven years after his infamous Cardiff Giant hoax. It was made of mortar, rock dust, clay, plaster, ground bones, blood and meat. It was kiln-fired for several days and buried near Mace's Hole in Beulah, Colorado.

Three months later, it was "discovered" by William A. Conant, who reportedly visited the area often to hunt for fossils. He claimed that while eating his lunch, he had spotted an unusual stone that resembled a human foot, and upon digging away at the surrounding earth, discovered a seven-foot human form lying beneath the ground. The entire figure, according to Conant, was embedded in hard clay which required the use of a pick-axe to remove, and was entangled in the roots of a cedar tree. He eventually unearthed it, however, and took it to Pueblo, where it was placed on display. Closer examination quickly dispelled the notion that the Solid Muldoon was a "petrified man"; instead, it was taken to be an ancient work of art, sculpted by an unknown primitive race. The Denver Daily Times dismissed the possibility of a hoax, asserting that "there can be no question about the genuineness of this piece of statuary".

Following the successful Colorado exhibition, the Solid Muldoon went on the road, attracting crowds all the way to New York City. The well-known showman P.T. Barnum was rumored to have offered $20,000 for the body. The hoax was eventually revealed to the New York Times as a man-made figure of modern origin, "with a knowing smile on his face as if enjoying the joke", one reporter noted. Following a lack of visitors, the Solid Muldoon disappeared from public attention.

== Description ==
The figure represented by the Solid Muldoon is approximately seven feet, six inches tall, and lies on his back, with one arm crossed over his chest and his other hand resting upon his leg. His appearance was described by one contemporary account as "Asiatic ... a cross between an ancient Egyptian and an American Indian". Aside from his height, the figure has several other unusual characteristics; each arm is nearly fifty inches long, and his feet are long, flat and slim. The end of the backbone protrudes outwards some two or three inches in the manner of a tail, which was seen as "strongly suggestive of the truth of the Darwinian theory".

== Legacy ==
The Solid Muldoon was the name of a local newspaper in Ouray, Colorado, founded on September 5, 1879 by David F. Day. Through a series of name changes and merges, it eventually became the present-day Durango Herald.

In 1976, almost a century after the original was crafted, an art student recreated the Solid Muldoon out of an iron beam, molded stucco wire and plaster, to celebrate the centennial of Colorado's statehood. The new Solid Muldoon was displayed in El Pueblo History Museum after a brief local tour. In 1984, it was buried in a marked plot near Highway 78 between Pueblo and Beulah.

"Solid Muldoon" is the name of a run at Deer Valley ski resort.

The Solid Muldoon is the subject of a musical written by Dr. David Volk, professor of music at CSU Pueblo.
