= Robbie Naismith =

New Zealand sailor (born 1964)

Robbie Naismith (born 4 May 1964) is a New Zealand sailor who has competed in multiple Whitbread Round the World Races and America's Cups.

From Whangārei, Naismith sailed in the 1989 Admiral's Cup before sailing the 1989–90 Whitbread Round the World Race on NCB Ireland.

He then joined New Zealand Challenge, sailing as a trimmer on NZL 20 in the 1992 America's Cup. He again competed in the 1993–94 Whitbread Round the World Race, this time winning the Whitbread 60 title with Yamaha.

He then joined Team New Zealand and was on NZL 32 when it won the 1995 America's Cup.

He sailed on Innovation Kvaerner in the 1997–98 Whitbread Round the World Race before re-joining Team New Zealand for their successful 2000 America's Cup defence.

Naismith joined Oracle Racing for the 2003 and 2007 Louis Vuitton Cups, where he led their sail programme. He sailed on Puma Racing's Il Mostro during the 2008–09 Volvo Ocean Race. He also sailed with Team Origin, and then Artemis Racing during the 2010 Louis Vuitton Trophy Dubai regatta.

He has also sailed on Wild Oats XI, including during the 2005, 2006, 2007 and 2008 Sydney to Hobart Yacht Races.
