= 2004 Sydney to Hobart Yacht Race =

2004 annual yacht race in Australia

60th Sydney to Hobart Yacht Race
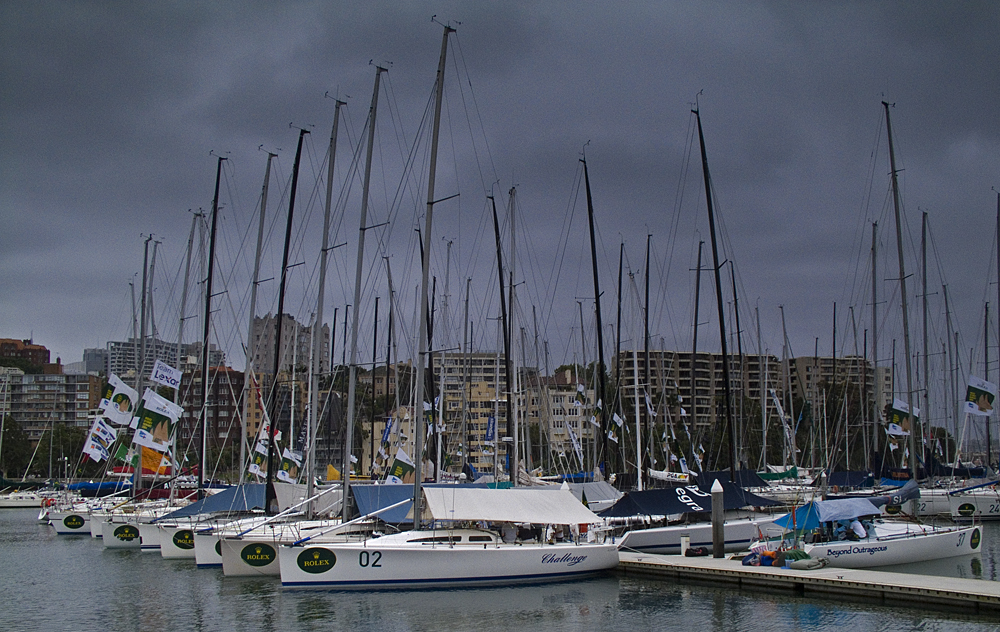
- Yachts docked before race start

Event information
- Type: Yacht
- Dates: 26 December 2004 – 3 January 2005
- Sponsor: Rolex
- Host city: Sydney, Hobart
- Boats: 116
- Distance: 630 nautical miles (1,170 km)
- Website: Website archive

Results
- Winner (2004): Nicorette III (Ludde Ingvall)

Succession
- Previous: Skandia (Grant Wharington) in 2003
- Next: Wild Oats XI (Mark Richards) in 2005

The 2004 Sydney to Hobart Yacht Race, sponsored by Rolex, was the 60th annual running of the "blue water classic" Sydney to Hobart Yacht Race. As in past editions of the race, it was hosted by the Cruising Yacht Club of Australia based in Sydney, New South Wales. The 2004 race began on Sydney Harbour at 1:10pm on Boxing Day (26 December 2004), before heading south for 630 nautical miles (1,170 km) through the Tasman Sea, past Bass Strait, into Storm Bay and up the River Derwent, to cross the finish line in Hobart, Tasmania.

The 2004 fleet comprised 116 starters of which 59 completed the race and 57 yachts retired. This was the last starting fleet over 100 until the 2014 race. The poor weather, the worst since the deadly 1998 race, forced 42 boats to withdraw from the race by the second day.

== Results ==
=== Line Honours ===
Pos	Sail Number	Yacht	State/Country	Yacht Type	LOA (Metres)	Skipper	Elapsed time d:hh:mm:ss
1	AUS11111	Nicorette	New South Wales	Simonis Voogd Maxi	27.38	Ludde Ingvall	2:16:00:44
2	A99	AAPT	New South Wales	Dovell MBD Open 66	20.03	Sean Langman	2:22:30:42
3	C1	Brindabella	New South Wales	Jutson 79	24.08	George Snow	3:00:46:50
4	GRE55	Aera	(United Kingdom) Great Britain	Ker 55	16.57	Nicholas Lykiardopulo; Jez Fanstone	3:02:33:43
5	8844	Seriously TEN	New South Wales	Davidson Volvo Ocean 60	19.46	John Woodruff; Eric Robinson	3:04:06:38 ^{1}
6	8880	Ichi Ban	New South Wales	Farr 52	15.79	Matt Allen	3:07:39:33
7	MH888	Nokia	New South Wales	Farr Volvo Ocean 60	19.44	Stephen McConaghy	3:07:44:42
8	5474	Maserati	New South Wales	Farr 65	19.72	Martin James; Ian Potter	3:12:44:17
9	YC3300	Hardys Secret Mens Business	South Australia	Reichel Pugh 46	14.22	Geoff Boettcher	3:23:07:38
10	SM46	Dekadence	(Victoria (state)) Victoria	Mills DK46	14.10	Philip Coombs	4:00:41:32
11	8448	Loki	New South Wales	Frers Swan 48	14.83	Stephen Ainsworth	4:01:06:09
12	5802	Austmark	New South Wales	Lyons-Cawse 46	14.12	Gunter Lindner-Schmidt	4:01:08:51
13	GER4014	DHL-Getaway Sailing	New South Wales	Farr Volvo Ocean 60	19.44	Andrew Lygo	4:03:06:58
14	YC560	Pale Ale Rager	South Australia	Elliott 56	17.10	Gary Shanks	4:04:40:51
15	8447	First National Real Estate	New South Wales	Farr Beneteau First 44.7	13.68	Michael Spies	4:04:59:50 ^{2}
16	R33	Chutzpah	(Victoria (state)) Victoria	Murray Burns Dovell Sydney 38	11.78	Bruce Taylor	4:05:19:08
17	6037	Eureka II	(United Kingdom) Great Britain	Murray Burns Dovell Sydney 60	18.20	Robbo Robertson	4:05:19:08
18	G162	Prowler	(Victoria (state)) Victoria	Elliott 47	14.41	Christian Jackson	4:05:20:14
19	5995	Nips-N-Tux	New South Wales	Jeppesen IMX 40	12.10	Howard De Torres	4:05:45:53
20	558	Interum	Tasmania	Lyons 41	12.17	Craig King	4:06:02:14
21	6565	Team Lexus	New South Wales	Murray Burns Dovell Sydney 38	11.78	Rupert Henry	4:06:17:16
22	R2099	Elektra	(Victoria (state)) Victoria	Farr Beneteau First 47.7	14.50	Michael Hiatt	4:12:15:37
23	G5785	Extasea	(Victoria (state)) Victoria	Murray Burns Dovell Sydney 40	12.47	Paul Buchholz	4:13:27:16
24	294	Love & War	New South Wales	Sparkman & Stephens S&S 47	14.22	Peter Kurts	4:13:30:36
25	SM2004	Another Challenge	(Victoria (state)) Victoria	Murray Burns Dovell Sydney 38	11.78	Chris Lewin	4:14:00:47
26	6188	Strewth	New South Wales	Lyons MKL 49	14.97	Geoff Hill	4:14:29:40
27	GBR2041	The Active Factor	South Africa	Thomas Challenge 67	20.48	Robert Swan; Bret Perry	4:15:03:36
28	6360	Integrity	New South Wales	Farr Beneteau 42.7	12.95	Andrew Stoeckel	4:15:44:36
29	4343	Wild Oats	New South Wales	Farr 43	13.11	Howard Piggott	4:15:45:20
30	HY161	Courtesan	Western Australia	Farr 38	11.70	Philip Childs	4:17:01:05
31	SM377	Bacardi	(Victoria (state)) Victoria	Peterson 44	13.34	Graeme Ainley; John Williams	4:18:05:11
32	6351	Cure Our Kids	New South Wales	Peterson Bavaria Match 38	11.39	Stephen Roach	4:18:53:36
33	R6572	Ice Fire	(Victoria (state)) Victoria	Mummery 45	13.85	Jeff Otter; Robin Warlond; Gary Caulfield	4:21:49:39
34	8301	Cadenza	New South Wales	Farr 50	15.10	Gunnar & Ulli Tuisk	4:21:57:08
35	6636	Abbott Tout	New South Wales	Farr Mumm 36	10.90	Marc & Louis Ryckmans; Ola Strand Andersen	4:23:01:11
36	AUS S37	Beyond Outrageous	(Victoria (state)) Victoria	Inglis 39	11.90	Miriana Ristivojevic; Tony Warren	4:23:13:09
37	AUS6155	Lexar	(United Kingdom) Great Britain	Murray Burns Dovell Sydney 38	11.78	Jakki Moores	5:00:37:18
38	6469	White Hot	New South Wales	Bakewell-White F36 Razor	11.00	Nigel Short; Warren Cottis	5:00:37:40
39	533	Pippin	Tasmania	Farr 37	11.40	David Taylor	5:01:29:04
40	4057	Aurora	New South Wales	Farr 40	12.19	Jim Holley	5:02:39:36
41	1987	Nautica Footwear BMS	New South Wales	Peterson 50	15.50	Randal Wilson; Hugh O'Neill	5:03:44:17
42	6146	Fine Line USA	United States	Farr Beneteau First 47.7	14.80	Michael Bird	5:03:44:37
43	SA998	Epsilon	Queensland	Van de Stadt 38	11.50	Michael Tromp	5:04:44:45
44	N11	Funnel-Web	New South Wales	Hick 50	15.21	Ivan MacFadyen	5:05:02:43
45	4924	She II	New South Wales	Mull Olsen 40	12.23	Peter Rodgers	5:06:25:31
46	5900	Wahoo	New South Wales	Frers 40	12.35	Brian Emerson	5:10:57:16
47	S16	Addiction	(Victoria (state)) Victoria	Inglis 37	11.62	Richard McGarvie; Peter Davison	5:16:36:06
48	4615	Quality Equipment	Tasmania	Farr 37	11.42	Alf Doedens	5:16:37:53
49	A121	Sailmaker	Tasmania	Adams 43	13.19	Jason Van Zetten	5:16:39:36
50	SM371	By Order Of The Secretary	(Victoria (state)) Victoria	Davidson Cavalier 37	11.26	George Shaw	5:17:11:20
51	GBR2660R	Leila	(United Kingdom) Great Britain	Frers Swan 46	14.39	Patrick Quinn; Ross Murray	5:18:04:36
52	5527	MCQ Polaris	New South Wales	Cole 43	13.20	Chris Dawe	5:18:20:19
53	546	Why Do I Do It	Tasmania	Lyons 36	11.70	Wayne Banks-Smith	5:19:12:19
54	SM117	Tilting at Windmills	(Victoria (state)) Victoria	Joubert Modified John Dory 42	12.83	Thorry Gunnersen	5:22:32:56
55	R54	Salterboats Natsumi	Western Australia	Roberts 54	16.00	Sherry Ellen; Gil Waller	5:23:32:03
56	3227	Rollercoaster	New South Wales	Murray Burns Dovell Sydney 32	9.73	David Bonallo	6:06:29:13
57	SM616	Magic	(Victoria (state)) Victoria	Sparkman & Stephens S&S 39	11.77	Philip Spry-Bailey	6:15:31:04
58	371	Berrimilla	New South Wales	Joubert Brolga 33	10.10	Alex Whitworth	6:17:35:21
59	C2	Gillawa	Australian Capital Territory	Salthouse Cavalier 975	9.76	David Kent	7:18:23:19
DNF	8338	AFR Midnight Rambler	New South Wales	Farr 40	12.41	Ed Psaltis; Bob Thomas	Retired-Crew Member Injury
DNF	NOR2	Andrew Short Marine	New South Wales	Davidson Volvo Ocean 60	19.44	Andrew Short	Retired-Skipper's Discretion
DNF	V1	Aspen 1	New South Wales	Farr Sled 77	23.50	Martin Wotton	Retired-Bow Delamination
DNF	6314	Athena	New South Wales	J&J Design Bavaria 38	11.82	David & Andrea McKay	Retired-Undisclosed Reasons
DNF	SM2	Challenge	(Victoria (state)) Victoria	Murray Burns Dovell Sydney 38	11.78	Lou Abrahams	Retired-Skipper's Discretion
DNF	SM8	Chance of Shenval	(Victoria (state)) Victoria	Farr 39	12.00	Robert Green	Retired-Undisclosed Reasons
DNF	7407	Chancellor	New South Wales	Farr Beneteau First 40.7	11.92	Ted Tooher; Marcus Bleasel	Retired-Skipper's Discretion
DNF	5664	Delta Wing	New South Wales	Camper & Nicholson Boden 44 Cruiser	13.52	Bill Koppe	Retired-Broken Gear
DNF	B7101	Dream Venture	(Victoria (state)) Victoria	Dubois 40	12.13	Alexandra McKinnon	Retired-Broken Mast
DNF	3433	Dreamtime	New South Wales	Holland 44	13.41	Paul Spira	Retired-Undisclosed Reasons
DNF	7027	Estate Master	New South Wales	Murray Burns Dovell Sydney 38	11.78	Martin & Lisa Hill	Retired-Skipper's Discretion
DNF	6814	EZ Street	New South Wales	Warwick 44	13.50	Bruce Dover; Trevor Cosh	Retired-Skipper's Discretion
DNF	R69	Fuzzy Logic	(Victoria (state)) Victoria	Murray Burns Dovell ILC 40	12.48	Paul Roberts; Bill Lennon	Retired-Skipper's Discretion
DNF	2712	Getaway-Sailing.com	New South Wales	J&J Design Grand Soleil 46	14.11	Chris Townsend	Retired-Undisclosed Reasons
DNF	4330	Grasshopper	New South Wales	Cole Nantucket 31	9.39	Graham Jackson	Retired-Broken Forestay
DNF	R930	Helsal II	(Victoria (state)) Victoria	Adams 65	20.04	William Rawson	Retired-Skipper's Discretion
DNF	9797	Hidden Agenda	New South Wales	Murray Burns Dovell Sydney 38	11.78	Graham Gibson	Retired-Crew Member Injury
DNF	MH60	Horwarth BRI	New South Wales	Murray Burns Dovell Sydney 38	11.78	Tony Levett	Retired-Crew Member Illness
DNF	MH106	Impeccable	New South Wales	Peterson 3/4 Tonner IOR	10.20	John Walker	Retired-Undisclosed Reasons
DNF	8679	Indec Merit	(Victoria (state)) Victoria	Farr Volvo Ocean 60	19.44	David Gotze	Retired-Skipper's Discretion
DNF	M762	Inner Circle	New South Wales	Farr 40 IOR	12.19	Michael Graham	Retired-Skipper's Discretion
DNF	5776	Isabella	New South Wales	Kaufman Northshore 380 Sports	11.63	John Nolan	Retired-Skipper's Discretion
DNF	7878	Kaz	New South Wales	Lyons 52	16.20	David Pescud	Retired-Skipper's Discretion
DNF	1317	Kickatinalong	New South Wales	Adams 13 Modified	13.41	Geoff Smith	Retired-Torn Mainsail
DNF	6700	Komatsu A Few Good Men	New South Wales	Farr Mumm 36	11.80	Shane Kearns	Retired-Skipper's Discretion
DNF	NZL10001	Konica Minolta	New Zealand	Bakewell-White Maxi 30m	30.00	Stewart Thwaites	Retired-Minor Structural Damage
DNF	SM1400	Kontrol	(Victoria (state)) Victoria	Jones Hart 45	13.85	Peter Blake	Retired-Rudder Bearing Fault
DNF	B7766	Lady Godiva	(Victoria (state)) Victoria	Sparkman & Stephens Swan 60	18.30	David Currie	Retired-Undisclosed Reasons
DNF	M666	Lucifarr	New South Wales	Farr 40	12.28	Mark Davies	Retired-Sail Damage
DNF	93	Merlin	New South Wales	Kaiko 51 Cruiser Racer	15.60	David Forbes; Richard Brooks	Retired-Undisclosed Reasons
DNF	8402	More Witchdoctor	New South Wales	Dibley Eagle 46	13.00	John Cameron	Retired-Crew Member Injury
DNF	2999	Obsession	New South Wales	Murray Burns Dovell Sydney 38	11.78	Martin Johnson	Retired-Undisclosed Reasons
DNF	S77	Outlaw	(Victoria (state)) Victoria	Sayer 44	13.44	Ray Semmens	Retired-Skipper's Discretion
DNF	6419	Pekljus	New South Wales	Radford 50	15.24	David Ferrall	Retired-Skipper's Discretion
DNF	2557	Phillip's Foote Witchdoctor	New South Wales	Davidson 42	12.00	Maurie Cameron	Retired-Skipper's Discretion
DNF	MH7	Pla Loma IV	New South Wales	Reichel Pugh DK43	13.02	Rob Reynolds	Retired-Skipper's Discretion
DNF	8924	Pretty Fly II	New South Wales	Farr Beneteau First 47.7	14.80	Colin Woods	Retired-HF Radio Failure
DNF	7447	Prime Time	New South Wales	Farr Beneteau 44.7	13.35	David Mason	Retired-Radio Issues
DNF	AUS6606	Quest Travelscene 66	Tasmania	Nelson Marek 46	14.19	John Bennetto	Retired-Broken Rudder
DNF	AUS70	Ragamuffin	New South Wales	Farr 50	15.50	Syd Fischer	Retired-Dismasted
DNF	RQ68	Ray White Unlimited Koomooloo	Queensland	Kaufman 41	12.49	Donald Freebairn	Retired-Skipper's Discretion
DNF	M236	Santana	New South Wales	Holland Swan 43	13.00	Mike Kelaher	Retired-Skipper's Discretion
DNF	7744	Sea Eagle 1	(Victoria (state)) Victoria	Farr Beneteau First 47.7	14.50	Robert Hanna	Retired-Undisclosed Reasons
DNF	9412	Sextant	New South Wales	Jeppesen X412	12.52	Denis Doyle; Lynne Smith	Retired-Undisclosed Reasons
DNF	M10	Skandia	(Victoria (state)) Victoria	Jones IRC Maxi 98	30.00	Grant Wharington	Retired-Capsized
DNF	508	Stormy Petrel	New South Wales	Sparkman & Stephens S&S 36	11.12	Kevin O'Shea	Retired-Skipper's Discretion
DNF	SM9797	Stratcorp Ninety Seven	(Victoria (state)) Victoria	Farr 47	14.32	Chris Dare	Retired-Skipper's Discretion
DNF	AUS7002	Targé	New South Wales	Reichel Pugh 60	18.57	Steven David; Iain Murray	Retired-Electrical Issues
DNF	R1111	Toecutter	(Victoria (state)) Victoria	Hick 31	9.45	Robert Hick	Retired-Skipper's Discretion
DNF	4182	Uptown Girl	New South Wales	Peterson 40	12.50	Rod Winton	Retired-Undisclosed Reasons
DNF	GER5497	Vineta	Germany	Reichel Pugh Marten 49	15.05	Felix Scheder-Bieschin	Retired-Undisclosed Reasons
DNF	M5	Windsong of Mornington	(Victoria (state)) Victoria	Hunter 410	12.43	Jim Watson	Retired-Skipper's Discretion
DNF	6224	Wiseman's Ferry	New South Wales	Farr 41	12.49	Roger Williamson	Retired-Broken Gooseneck
DNF	6068	Yeah Baby	New South Wales	Murray Burns Dovell Sydney 38	11.78	Mick Hinchey; Dennis Hume	Retired-Skipper's Discretion
DNF	8848	Yellowtail	New South Wales	Fa-Steinman Modified Custom 66	20.00	Michael Cranitch; Ray Wallace	Retired-Skipper's Discretion
DNF	1836	Yendys	New South Wales	Judel Vroljik JV52	15.75	Geoff Ross	Retired-Skipper's Discretion
DNF	3838	Zen	New South Wales	Murray Burns Dovell Sydney 38	11.78	Gordon Ketelbey	Retired-Crew Seasickness

Notes

^1 – Seriously TEN were given a 60 minutes penalty to be added onto their elapsed time by the International Jury due to failing to maintain a continuous listening watch on the race radio frequencies for the duration of their race as required by Sailing Instruction 40 (Radio Transmissions).
^2 – First National Real Estate were given a 2 minutes redress to be subtracted off their elapsed time under RRS 26 & 29.2 by the International Jury due to an incident where they were delayed due to the Race Committee starting vessel weighing anchor while they were completing a manoeuvre of sailing around to the prestart side of the starting line before the start of the race.

=== Overall Handicap ===
Pos	Division	Sail Number	Yacht	State/Country	Yacht Type	LOA (Metres)	Skipper	Corrected time d:hh:mm:ss
1	A	GRE55	Aera	(United Kingdom) Great Britain	Ker 55	16.57	Nicholas Lykiardopulo; Jez Fanstone	4:02:52:09
2	A	AUS11111	Nicorette	New South Wales	Simonis Voogd Maxi	27.38	Ludde Ingvall	4:07:18:57
3	A	8880	Ichi Ban	New South Wales	Farr 52	15.79	Matt Allen	4:08:54:40
4	A	A99	AAPT	New South Wales	Dovell MBD Open 66	20.03	Sean Langman	4:13:26:03
5	A	C1	Brindabella	New South Wales	Jutson 79	24.08	George Snow	4:14:11:23
6	B	8448	Loki	New South Wales	Frers Swan 48	14.83	Stephen Ainsworth	4:14:47:38
7	E	294	Love & War	New South Wales	Sparkman & Stephens S&S 47	14.22	Peter Kurts	4:15:35:26
8	C	5995	Nips-N-Tux	New South Wales	Jeppesen IMX 40	12.10	Howard De Torres	4:15:44:16
9	C	8447	First National Real Estate	New South Wales	Farr Beneteau First 44.7	13.68	Michael Spies	4:16:18:32
10	C	R33	Chutzpah	(Victoria (state)) Victoria	Murray Burns Dovell Sydney 38	11.78	Bruce Taylor	4:16:37:32
11	C	6565	Team Lexus	New South Wales	Murray Burns Dovell Sydney 38	11.78	Rupert Henry	4:17:44:38
12	B	558	Interum	Tasmania	Lyons 41	12.17	Craig King	4:19:42:37
13	A	SM46	Dekadence	(Victoria (state)) Victoria	Mills DK46	14.10	Philip Coombs	4:20:59:51
14	D	HY161	Courtesan	Western Australia	Farr 38	11.70	Philip Childs	4:21:25:33
15	A	5802	Austmark	New South Wales	Lyons-Cawse 46	14.12	Gunter Lindner-Schmidt	4:21:44:34
16	D	4343	Wild Oats	New South Wales	Farr 43	13.11	Howard Piggott	4:22:00:50
17	D	SM377	Bacardi	(Victoria (state)) Victoria	Peterson 44	13.34	Graeme Ainley; John Williams	4:22:52:41
18	E	533	Pippin	Tasmania	Farr 37	11.40	David Taylor	5:00:45:20
19	D	6360	Integrity	New South Wales	Farr Beneteau 42.7	12.95	Andrew Stoeckel	5:01:01:05
20	A	YC3300	Hardys Secret Mens Business	South Australia	Reichel Pugh 46	14.22	Geoff Boettcher	5:01:22:56
21	C	SM2004	Another Challenge	(Victoria (state)) Victoria	Murray Burns Dovell Sydney 38	11.78	Chris Lewin	5:02:20:04
22	B	R2099	Elektra	(Victoria (state)) Victoria	Farr Beneteau First 47.7	14.50	Michael Hiatt	5:02:46:02
23	D	6351	Cure Our Kids	New South Wales	Peterson Bavaria Match 38	11.39	Stephen Roach	5:02:56:09
24	B	GBR2041	The Active Factor	South Africa	Thomas Challenge 67	20.48	Robert Swan; Bret Perry	5:04:16:34
25	C	SA998	Epsilon	Queensland	Van de Stadt 38	11.50	Michael Tromp	5:04:52:14
26	A	G162	Prowler	(Victoria (state)) Victoria	Elliott 47	14.41	Christian Jackson	5:07:41:06
27	B	G5785	Extasea	(Victoria (state)) Victoria	Murray Burns Dovell Sydney 40	12.47	Paul Buchholz	5:08:16:50
28	A	YC560	Pale Ale Rager	South Australia	Elliott 56	17.10	Gary Shanks	5:08:46:15
29	D	4057	Aurora	New South Wales	Farr 40	12.19	Jim Holley	5:09:17:01
30	A	6037	Eureka II	(United Kingdom) Great Britain	Murray Burns Dovell Sydney 60	18.20	Robbo Robertson	5:09:23:03
31	C	6636	Abbott Tout	New South Wales	Farr Mumm 36	10.90	Marc & Louis Ryckmans; Ola Strand Andersen	5:10:41:01
32	D	6469	White Hot	New South Wales	Bakewell-White F36 Razor	11.00	Nigel Short; Warren Cottis	5:11:14:35
33	C	AUS6155	Lexar	(United Kingdom) Great Britain	Murray Burns Dovell Sydney 38	11.78	Jakki Moores	5:14:07:53
34	E	SM371	By Order Of The Secretary	(Victoria (state)) Victoria	Davidson Cavalier 37	11.26	George Shaw	5:14:10:15
35	E	5527	MCQ Polaris	New South Wales	Cole 43	13.20	Chris Dawe	5:15:09:24
36	D	5900	Wahoo	New South Wales	Frers 40	12.35	Brian Emerson	5:15:55:51
37	B	AUS S37	Beyond Outrageous	(Victoria (state)) Victoria	Inglis 39	11.90	Miriana Ristivojevic; Tony Warren	5:16:44:40
38	B	8301	Cadenza	New South Wales	Farr 50	15.10	Gunnar & Ulli Tuisk	5:17:46:06
39	E	4615	Quality Equipment	Tasmania	Farr 37	11.42	Alf Doedens	5:20:11:02
40	B	6146	Fine Line USA	United States	Farr Beneteau First 47.7	14.80	Michael Bird	5:20:34:22
41	E	371	Berrimilla	New South Wales	Joubert Brolga 33	10.10	Alex Whitworth	5:23:58:33
42	D	A121	Sailmaker	Tasmania	Adams 43	13.19	Jason Van Zetten	6:05:30:22
43	D	SM117	Tilting at Windmills	(Victoria (state)) Victoria	Joubert Modified John Dory 42	12.83	Thorry Gunnersen	6:06:40:27
44	C	546	Why Do I Do It	Tasmania	Lyons 36	11.70	Wayne Banks-Smith	6:09:57:40
45	E	3227	Rollercoaster	New South Wales	Murray Burns Dovell Sydney 32	9.73	David Bonallo	6:10:33:00
46	B	S16	Addiction	(Victoria (state)) Victoria	Inglis 37	11.62	Richard McGarvie; Peter Davison	6:11:27:10
47	E	C2	Gillawa	Australian Capital Territory	Salthouse Cavalier 975	9.76	David Kent	6:19:16:35
48	A	N11	Funnel-Web	New South Wales	Hick 50	15.21	Ivan MacFadyen	6:20:56:05
DNF	B	8338	AFR Midnight Rambler	New South Wales	Farr 40	12.41	Ed Psaltis; Bob Thomas	Retired-Crew Member Injury
DNF	A	V1	Aspen 1	New South Wales	Farr Sled 77	23.50	Martin Wotton	Retired-Bow Delamination
DNF	C	SM2	Challenge	(Victoria (state)) Victoria	Murray Burns Dovell Sydney 38	11.78	Lou Abrahams	Retired-Skipper's Discretion
DNF	D	7407	Chancellor	New South Wales	Farr Beneteau First 40.7	11.92	Ted Tooher; Marcus Bleasel	Retired-Skipper's Discretion
DNF	D	B7101	Dream Venture	(Victoria (state)) Victoria	Dubois 40	12.13	Alexandra McKinnon	Retired-Broken Mast
DNF	C	7027	Estate Master	New South Wales	Murray Burns Dovell Sydney 38	11.78	Martin & Lisa Hill	Retired-Skipper's Discretion
DNF	B	R69	Fuzzy Logic	(Victoria (state)) Victoria	Murray Burns Dovell ILC 40	12.48	Paul Roberts; Bill Lennon	Retired-Skipper's Discretion
DNF	C	2712	Getaway-Sailing.com	New South Wales	J&J Design Grand Soleil 46	14.11	Chris Townsend	Retired-Undisclosed Reasons
DNF	E	4330	Grasshopper	New South Wales	Cole Nantucket 31	9.39	Graham Jackson	Retired-Broken Forestay
DNF	C	9797	Hidden Agenda	New South Wales	Murray Burns Dovell Sydney 38	11.78	Graham Gibson	Retired-Crew Member Injury
DNF	C	MH60	Horwarth BRI	New South Wales	Murray Burns Dovell Sydney 38	11.78	Tony Levett	Retired-Crew Member Illness
DNF	E	MH106	Impeccable	New South Wales	Peterson 3/4 Tonner IOR	10.20	John Walker	Retired-Undisclosed Reasons
DNF	D	M762	Inner Circle	New South Wales	Farr 40 IOR	12.19	Michael Graham	Retired-Skipper's Discretion
DNF	E	5776	Isabella	New South Wales	Kaufman Northshore 380 Sports	11.63	John Nolan	Retired-Skipper's Discretion
DNF	A	NZL10001	Konica Minolta	New Zealand	Bakewell-White Maxi 30m	30.00	Stewart Thwaites	Retired-Minor Structural Damage
DNF	A	SM1400	Kontrol	(Victoria (state)) Victoria	Jones Hart 45	13.85	Peter Blake	Retired-Rudder Bearing Fault
DNF	B	B7766	Lady Godiva	(Victoria (state)) Victoria	Sparkman & Stephens Swan 60	18.30	David Currie	Retired-Undisclosed Reasons
DNF	D	M666	Lucifarr	New South Wales	Farr 40	12.28	Mark Davies	Retired-Sail Damage
DNF	A	93	Merlin	New South Wales	Kaiko 51 Cruiser Racer	15.60	David Forbes; Richard Brooks	Retired-Undisclosed Reasons
DNF	C	2999	Obsession	New South Wales	Murray Burns Dovell Sydney 38	11.78	Martin Johnson	Retired-Undisclosed Reasons
DNF	A	S77	Outlaw	(Victoria (state)) Victoria	Sayer 44	13.44	Ray Semmens	Retired-Skipper's Discretion
DNF	A	6419	Pekljus	New South Wales	Radford 50	15.24	David Ferrall	Retired-Skipper's Discretion
DNF	A	MH7	Pla Loma IV	New South Wales	Reichel Pugh DK43	13.02	Rob Reynolds	Retired-Skipper's Discretion
DNF	B	8924	Pretty Fly II	New South Wales	Farr Beneteau First 47.7	14.80	Colin Woods	Retired-HF Radio Failure
DNF	C	7447	Prime Time	New South Wales	Farr Beneteau 44.7	13.35	David Mason	Retired-Radio Issues
DNF	A	AUS6606	Quest Travelscene 66	Tasmania	Nelson Marek 46	14.19	John Bennetto	Retired-Broken Rudder
DNF	A	AUS70	Ragamuffin	New South Wales	Farr 50	15.50	Syd Fischer	Retired-Dismasted
DNF	E	RQ68	Ray White Unlimited Koomooloo	Queensland	Kaufman 41	12.49	Donald Freebairn	Retired-Skipper's Discretion
DNF	B	7744	Sea Eagle 1	(Victoria (state)) Victoria	Farr Beneteau First 47.7	14.50	Robert Hanna	Retired-Undisclosed Reasons
DNF	D	9412	Sextant	New South Wales	Jeppesen X412	12.52	Denis Doyle; Lynne Smith	Retired-Undisclosed Reasons
DNF	A	M10	Skandia	(Victoria (state)) Victoria	Jones IRC Maxi 98	30.00	Grant Wharington	Retired-Capsized
DNF	E	508	Stormy Petrel	New South Wales	Sparkman & Stephens S&S 36	11.12	Kevin O'Shea	Retired-Skipper's Discretion
DNF	A	SM9797	Stratcorp Ninety Seven	(Victoria (state)) Victoria	Farr 47	14.32	Chris Dare	Retired-Skipper's Discretion
DNF	A	AUS7002	Targé	New South Wales	Reichel Pugh 60	18.57	Steven David; Iain Murray	Retired-Electrical Issues
DNF	E	R1111	Toecutter	(Victoria (state)) Victoria	Hick 31	9.45	Robert Hick	Retired-Skipper's Discretion
DNF	D	4182	Uptown Girl	New South Wales	Peterson 40	12.50	Rod Winton	Retired-Undisclosed Reasons
DNF	A	GER5497	Vineta	Germany	Reichel Pugh Marten 49	15.05	Felix Scheder-Bieschin	Retired-Undisclosed Reasons
DNF	C	6068	Yeah Baby	New South Wales	Murray Burns Dovell Sydney 38	11.78	Mick Hinchey; Dennis Hume	Retired-Skipper's Discretion
DNF	A	8848	Yellowtail	New South Wales	Fa-Steinman Modified Custom 66	20.00	Michael Cranitch; Ray Wallace	Retired-Skipper's Discretion
DNF	A	1836	Yendys	New South Wales	Judel Vroljik JV52	15.75	Geoff Ross	Retired-Skipper's Discretion
DNF	C	3838	Zen	New South Wales	Murray Burns Dovell Sydney 38	11.78	Gordon Ketelbey	Retired-Crew Seasickness
