= 2006 Sydney to Hobart Yacht Race =

2006 annual yacht race in Australia

62nd Sydney to Hobart Yacht Race
Event information
- Type: Yacht
- Dates: 26 December 2006 – 1 January 2007
- Sponsor: Rolex
- Host city: Sydney, Hobart
- Boats: 78
- Distance: 630 nautical miles (1,170 km)
- Website: Website archive

Results
- Winner (2006): Wild Oats XI (Mark Richards)

Succession
- Previous: Wild Oats XI (Mark Richards) in 2005
- Next: Wild Oats XI (Mark Richards) in 2007

The 2006 Sydney to Hobart Yacht Race, sponsored by Rolex, was the 62nd annual running of the "blue water classic" Sydney to Hobart Yacht Race. As in past editions of the race, it was hosted by the Cruising Yacht Club of Australia based in Sydney, New South Wales. As with previous Sydney to Hobart Yacht Races, the 2006 edition began on Sydney Harbour, at 1pm on Boxing Day (26 December 2006), before heading south for 630 nautical miles (1,170 km) through the Tasman Sea, past Bass Strait, into Storm Bay and up the River Derwent, to cross the finish line in Hobart, Tasmania.

The 2006 fleet comprised 78 starters of which 69 completed the race and nine yachts retired.

== Results ==
=== Line Honours ===
Pos	Sail Number	Yacht	State/Country	Yacht Type	LOA (Metres)	Skipper	Elapsed time d:hh:mm:ss
1	10001	Wild Oats XI	New South Wales	Reichel Pugh RP100	30.00	Mark Richards	2:08:52:33
2	AUS 03	Ichi Ban	New South Wales	Jones 70	21.50	Matt Allen	2:12:42:23
3	M10	Skandia	(Victoria (state)) Victoria	Jones IRC Maxi 98	30.00	Grant Wharington	2:12:58:56
4	1836	Yendys	New South Wales	Reichel Pugh 55	16.80	Geoff Ross	2:23:45:26
5	6952	Wot Yot	New South Wales	Nelson Marek TP 52	15.85	Graeme Wood	3:02:34:28
6	60000	Loki	New South Wales	Reichel Pugh 60	18.29	Stephen Ainsworth; Cameron Miles	3:03:01:02
7	8899	Quantum Racing	New South Wales	Farr Cookson 50	15.20	Ray Roberts	3:03:02:29
8	GER4014	DHL	New South Wales	Farr Volvo Ocean 60	19.44	Mitch Booth	3:06:04:04
9	93	Merlin	New South Wales	Kaiko 51	15.60	David Forbes; Richard Brooks	3:08:35:37
10	YC3300	Hardys Secret Mens Business	South Australia	Reichel Pugh 46	14.21	Geoff Boettcher	3:08:55:46
11	SM4321R	Flirt	(Victoria (state)) Victoria	Corby 49	14.93	Chris Dare	3:11:31:16
12	ITA2945	DSK Comifin	Italy	Nautor Swan 45	13.80	Danilo Salsi	3:11:35:42
13	NOR2	Getaway-CMC Markets	New South Wales	Davidson Volvo Ocean 60	19.44	Peter Goldsworthy	3:12:05:45
14	8880	Goldfinger	(Victoria (state)) Victoria	Farr 52	15.79	Peter Blake; Kate Mitchell	3:12:50:12
15	HW42	Wedgetail	Queensland	Welbourn 42	12.80	Bill Wild	3:13:09:40
16	GBR4519L	Jazz	(United Kingdom) Great Britain	Amel 54	14.64	Chris Bull	3:13:17:04
17	SM2	Challenge	(Victoria (state)) Victoria	Murray Burns Dovell Sydney 38	11.78	Lou Abrahams	3:14:24:53
18	AUS70	Ragamuffin	New South Wales	Farr 50	15.50	Syd Fischer	3:15:31:03
19	G147	Ocean Skins	(Victoria (state)) Victoria	Inglis 47	14.30	Tony Fowler	3:16:04:35
20	Q999	Another Fiasco	Queensland	Jutson 43	12.88	Damian Suckling	3:16:49:22
21	B45	Nautilus Marine Rush	(Victoria (state)) Victoria	Farr 45	13.81	Ian & John Paterson	3:16:52:00
22	CR1000	Ausmaid	Western Australia	Farr 47	14.47	Trevor Taylor	3:16:53:28
23	8338	AFR Midnight Rambler	New South Wales	Farr 40	12.41	Ed Psaltis	3:17:46:55
24	B60	Gusto 1	(Victoria (state)) Victoria	Biddlecombe Open 60	18.25	Brian Pattinson	3:17:57:31
25	7447	Alacrity	Queensland	Farr Beneteau First 44.7	13.35	Matthew Percy	3:18:38:50
26	6559	Wot's Next	New South Wales	Murray Burns Dovell Sydney 47	14.20	Bill Sykes	3:18:58:43
27	6068	Star Dean-Willcocks	New South Wales	Murray Burns Dovell Sydney 38	11.78	Ola Strand Andersen; Marc & Louis Ryckmans	3:19:03:51
28	7802T	Adventure	(United Kingdom) Great Britain	Thomas-Condylis Challenge 67	20.42	Charles Roberts	3:19:06:02 ^{1}
29	SM377	Bacardi	(Victoria (state)) Victoria	Peterson 44	13.34	Graeme Ainley; John Williams	3:19:16:04
30	MH7	Pla Loma IV	New South Wales	Reichel Pugh DK43	13.02	Rob Reynolds	3:20:10:09
31	8402	Fincorp More Witchcraft	New South Wales	Dibley 46	13.95	John Cameron	3:20:11:40
32	294	Love & War	New South Wales	Sparkman & Stephens S&S 47	14.21	Simon Kurts; Lindsay May	3:20:17:24
33	SM2004	Another Challenge	(Victoria (state)) Victoria	Murray Burns Dovell Sydney 38	11.78	Chris Lewin; Rob Green	3:22:19:46
34	8447	Mr Beaks Ribs	New South Wales	Farr Beneteau First 44.7	13.68	David Beak; Nicholas Press	3:22:21:18
35	4100	Terra Firma	(Victoria (state)) Victoria	Murray 41	12.50	Nicholas Bartels	3:22:26:04
36	5995	Nips-N-Tux	New South Wales	Jeppesen IMX 40	12.10	Howard De Torres	3:22:27:37
37	R41	Laurelle	(Victoria (state)) Victoria	Farr 42	12.75	Ray Borrett	3:22:29:45
38	4057	Aurora	New South Wales	Farr 40 One Off	12.30	Jim Holley	3:23:20:20 ^{2}
39	MH60	Horwarth BRI	New South Wales	Murray Burns Dovell Sydney 38	11.78	Tony Levett	3:23:28:39
40	6146	Kioni-UK	(United Kingdom) Great Britain	Farr Beneteau First 47.7	14.80	John Liddell	3:23:32:54
41	6565	Team Lexus	New South Wales	Murray Burns Dovell Sydney 38	11.78	Frank Sticovich	3:23:33:46
42	370	Fruit	Tasmania	Jones 39 Mod	11.96	Mark Ballard	3:23:52:21
43	MH442	National Credit Insurance-Toy Box	New South Wales	Jeppesen X442	13.50	Ian Box	3:23:52:57
44	H191	Tevake II	(Victoria (state)) Victoria	Radford 13.7	13.70	Angus Fletcher	4:00:01:55
45	74373	Kinetic	Canada	Farr Beneteau First 47.7	14.51	David Sutcliffe	4:00:06:17
46	6081	Global Yacht Racing Next	New South Wales	Murray Burns Dovell Sydney 38	11.78	Andy Middleton	4:00:15:19
47	L77	Creative Intension	Tasmania	Murray Burns Dovell MBD36	11.00	David Rees; Craig Escott	4:00:18:20
48	5612	Abracadabra	New South Wales	Tripp 47	14.33	James Murchison	4:00:51:43
49	SM5985	INSX	(Victoria (state)) Victoria	Jutson NSX 38	11.63	Robert Still	4:02:30:28
50	HY1407	Knee Deep	Western Australia	Farr Beneteau First 40.7	11.92	Philip Childs	4:02:55:35
51	7407	Chancellor-Dodo	New South Wales	Farr Beneteau First 40.7	11.92	Ted Tooher	4:03:04:25
52	45	Fidelis	New South Wales	Knud Reimers 61	18.60	Nigel Stoke	4:03:41:54
53	3433	Dreamtime	New South Wales	Holland 44	13.41	Paul Spira	4:04:57:36
54	2557	Phillip's Foote Witchdoctor	New South Wales	Davidson 42	12.00	Maurie Cameron	4:05:03:09
55	262	Helsal IV	Tasmania	Briand Dynamique 62	18.65	Tony Fisher	4:05:48:28
56	7551	Arctos	New South Wales	Radford McIntyre 55	16.36	Colin Burgess; Andy Fairclough	4:05:58:49
57	MH106	Impeccable	New South Wales	Peterson 3/4 Tonner IOR	10.20	John Walker	4:06:06:27
58	R63	Prion	(Victoria (state)) Victoria	Lyons Modified Mount Gay 30	9.59	Michael Dolphin	4:06:19:10
59	1407	Pelagic Magic	New South Wales	Farr Beneteau First 40.7	11.92	Ross McDonald; Wayne Jenkins	4:08:08:26
60	5356	Illusion	New South Wales	Davidson 34	10.36	Graham Jackson	4:10:40:32
61	4924	She	New South Wales	Mull Olsen 40	12.23	Peter Rodgers	4:10:47:30
62	5527	Polaris of Belmont	New South Wales	Cole 43	13.20	Chris Dawe	4:12:21:54
63	A19	Maluka	New South Wales	Gale Ranger 30	9.01	Sean Langman	4:14:17:39
64	A5	BSG 'On Tap'	Queensland	Blackburn Duncanson 34	10.26	Marc Stuart	4:15:51:38
65	SM616	Magic	(Victoria (state)) Victoria	Sparkman & Stephens S&S 39	11.76	Philip Spry-Bailey	4:16:31:11
66	GBR24R	Capriccio of Rhu	(United Kingdom) Great Britain	Holman & Pye Oyster 55	17.00	Michele Colenso; Andrew Poole	4:17:18:41
67	5139	Katinka	New South Wales	Cole Pawtucket 35	10.47	Paul O'Connell	4:19:04:50
68	371	Berrimilla	New South Wales	Joubert Brolga 33	10.10	Alex Whitworth	5:01:50:31
69	C2	Gillawa	Australian Capital Territory	Salthouse Cavalier 975	9.76	David Kent	5:07:55:37
DNF	NED 1	ABN AMRO ONE	(Netherlands)	Juan-K Jones 70	21.50	Mike Sanderson	Retired-Dismasted
DNF	R33	Chutzpah	(Victoria (state)) Victoria	Murray Burns Dovell Sydney 38	11.78	Bruce Taylor	Retired-Steering Problems
DNF	7555	Endorfin	New South Wales	Murray Burns Dovell 47	14.33	Peter Mooney	Retired-Steering Gear Failure
DNF	R50	Living Doll	(Victoria (state)) Victoria	Farr Cookson 50	15.05	Michael Hiatt	Retired-Radio Problems
DNF	NZL99999	Maximus	New Zealand	Elliott Maxi	30.00	Charles St Clair Brown; Bill Buckley	Retired-Dismasted
DNF	6522	Mr Kite	New South Wales	Cape Barrett Kite 40	12.19	Andrew Buckland; Andrew Hunn	Retired-Rigging Problems
DNF	RQ68	Ray White Koomooloo	Queensland	Kaufman 41	12.49	Mike Freebairn	Retired-Sunk
DNF	7878	Sailors With Disabilities	New South Wales	Lyons 54	16.20	David Pescud	Retired-Rudder Problems
DNF	S3274	Salona	New South Wales	J&J Yachts Salona 44	11.29	Phillip King	Retired-Steering Failure

Notes

^1 – Adventure were given a 300 minutes redress to be subtracted off their elapsed time under RRS 1.1 by the International Jury due to an incident where they provided assistance after Ray White Koomooloo sunk and the crew was rescued on the second day of the race.
^2 – Aurora were given a 240 minutes redress to be subtracted off their elapsed time under RRS 1.1 by the International Jury due to an incident where they were honouring their obligations and providing assistance after Ray White Koomooloo sunk and the crew was rescued on the second day of the race.

=== Overall Handicap ===
Pos	Division	Sail Number	Yacht	State/Country	Yacht Type	LOA (Metres)	Skipper	Corrected time d:hh:mm:ss
1	E	294	Love & War	New South Wales	Sparkman & Stephens S&S 47	14.21	Lindsay May	3:22:02:37
2	E	SM377	Bacardi	(Victoria (state)) Victoria	Peterson 44	13.34	John Williams	3:23:00:35
3	D	SM2	Challenge	(Victoria (state)) Victoria	Murray Burns Dovell Sydney 38	11.78	Lou Abrahams	4:00:05:35
4	A	AUS 03	Ichi Ban	New South Wales	Jones 70	21.50	Matt Allen	4:00:35:02
5	E	MH106	Impeccable	(New South Wales)	Peterson 3/4 Tonner IOR	10.20	John Walker	4:02:01:24
6	B	1836	Yendys	New South Wales	Reichel Pugh 55	16.80	Geoff Ross	4:03:05:48
7	C	ITA2945	DSK Comifin	Italy	Swan 45	13.80	Danilo Salsi	4:03:13:38
8	E	A19	Maluka	New South Wales	Gale Ranger	9.01	Sean Langman	4:03:42:21
9	E	4057	Aurora	New South Wales	Farr 40	12.30	Jim Holley	4:03:43:28
10	E	A5	BSG 'On Tap'	Queensland	Blackburn Duncanson 34	10.26	Marc Stuart	4:04:00:12
11	B	6952	Wot Yot	New South Wales	Nelson Marek TP 52	15.85	Graeme Wood	4:04:09:13
12	A	10001	Wild Oats XI	New South Wales	Reichel Pugh RP100	30.00	Mark Richards	4:05:00:41
13	D	6068	Star Dean-Willcocks	New South Wales	Murray Burns Dovell Sydney 38	11.78	Ola Strand Andersen; Marc & Louis Ryckmans	4:05:15:48
14	C	93	Merlin	New South Wales	Kaiko 51	15.60	David Forbes; Richard Brooks	4:05:18:22
15	A	8899	Quantum Racing	New South Wales	Farr Cookson 50	15.20	Ray Roberts	4:05:22:51
16	D	7447	Alacrity	Queensland	Farr Beneteau First 44.7	13.35	Matthew Percy	4:05:42:22
17	C	GBR4519L	Jazz	(United Kingdom) Great Britain	Amel 54	14.64	Chris Bull	4:06:25:36
18	C	YC3300	Hardys Secret Mens Business	South Australia	Reichel Pugh 46	14.21	Geoff Boettcher	4:06:27:24
19	C	HW42	Wedgetail	Queensland	Welbourn 42	12.80	Bill Wild	4:06:52:29
20	D	5995	Nips-N-Tux	New South Wales	Jeppesen IMX 40	12.10	Howard De Torres	4:07:54:23
21	D	7802T	Adventure	(United Kingdom) Great Britain	Thomas-Condylis Challenge 67	20.42	Charles Roberts	4:07:56:45
22	D	L77	Creative Intension	Tasmania	Murray Burns Dovell MBD36	11.00	David Rees; Craig Escott	4:08:12:09
23	E	5356	Illusion	New South Wales	Davidson 34	10.36	Graham Jackson	4:08:13:19
24	D	8338	AFR Midnight Rambler	New South Wales	Farr 40	12.41	Ed Psaltis	4:08:19:36
25	D	MH442	National Credit Insurance-Toy Box	New South Wales	Jeppesen X442	13.50	Ian Box	4:08:47:58
26	D	SM2004	Another Challenge	(Victoria (state)) Victoria	Murray Burns Dovell Sydney 38	11.78	Chris Lewin; Rob Green	4:08:53:40
27	D	8447	Mr Beaks Ribs	New South Wales	Farr Beneteau First 44.7	13.68	David Beak; Nicholas Press	4:09:06:41
29	D	7407	Chancellor-Dodo	New South Wales	Farr Beneteau First 40.7	11.92	Ted Tooher	4:09:18:55
29	D	370	Fruit	Tasmania	Jones 39 Mod	11.96	Mark Ballard	4:09:27:35
30	B	60000	Loki	New South Wales	Reichel Pugh 60	18.29	Stephen Ainsworth; Cameron Miles	4:09:28:27
31	E	5527	Polaris of Belmont	New South Wales	Cole 43	13.20	Chris Dawe	4:09:45:51
32	C	SM4321R	Flirt	(Victoria (state)) Victoria	Corby 49	14.93	Chris Dare	4:09:54:17
33	D	HY1407	Knee Deep	Western Australia	Farr Beneteau First 40.7	11.92	Philip Childs	4:09:57:01
34	D	MH60	Horwarth BRI	New South Wales	Murray Burns Dovell Sydney 38	11.78	Tony Levett	4:10:10:16
35	D	6565	Team Lexus	New South Wales	Murray Burns Dovell Sydney 38	11.78	Frank Sticovich	4:10:15:57
36	D	6081	Global Yacht Racing Next	New South Wales	Murray Burns Dovell Sydney 38	11.78	Andy Middleton	4:11:02:09
37	D	6559	Wot's Next	New South Wales	Murray Burns Dovell Sydney 47	14.20	Bill Sykes	4:11:10:22
38	D	6146	Kioni-UK	(United Kingdom) Great Britain	Farr Beneteau First 47.7	14.80	John Liddell	4:11:23:47
39	A	M10	Skandia	(Victoria (state)) Victoria	Jones IRC Maxi 98	30.00	Grant Wharington	4:12:07:17
40	D	4100	Terra Firma	(Victoria (state)) Victoria	Murray 41	12.50	Nicholas Bartels	4:12:30:19
41	E	371	Berrimilla	New South Wales	Joubert Brolga 33	10.10	Alex Whitworth	4:12:33:40
42	D	74373	Kinetic	Canada	Farr Beneteau First 47.7	14.51	David Sutcliffe	4:12:41:40
43	C	CR1000	Ausmaid	Western Australia	Farr 47	14.47	Trevor Taylor	4:12:42:50
44	D	R41	Laurelle	(Victoria (state)) Victoria	Farr 42	12.75	Ray Borrett	4:12:45:53
45	C	B45	Nautilus Marine Rush	(Victoria (state)) Victoria	Farr 45	13.81	Ian & John Paterson	4:13:02:22
46	D	R63	Prion	(Victoria (state)) Victoria	Lyons Modified Mount Gay 30	9.59	Michael Dolphin	4:13:41:11
47	C	MH7	Pla Loma IV	New South Wales	Reichel Pugh DK43	13.02	Rob Reynolds	4:14:08:32
48	C	AUS70	Ragamuffin	New South Wales	Farr 50	15.50	Syd Fischer	4:14:37:20
49	B	8880	Goldfinger	(Victoria (state)) Victoria	Farr 52	15.79	Peter Blake; Kate Mitchell	4:14:37:37
50	D	1407	Pelagic Magic	New South Wales	Farr Beneteau First 40.7	11.92	Ross McDonald; Wayne Jenkins	4:15:50:49
51	C	H191	Tevake II	(Victoria (state)) Victoria	Radford 13.7	13.70	Angus Fletcher	4:18:16:41
DNF	A	NED 1	ABN AMRO ONE	(Netherlands)	Juan-K Jones 70	21.50	Mike Sanderson	Retired-Dismasted
DNF	D	R33	Chutzpah	(Victoria (state)) Victoria	Murray Burns Dovell Sydney 38	11.78	Bruce Taylor	Retired-Steering Problems
DNF	D	7555	Endorfin	New South Wales	Murray Burns Dovell 47	14.33	Peter Mooney	Retired-Steering Gear Failure
DNF	B	R50	Living Doll	(Victoria (state)) Victoria	Farr Cookson 50	15.05	Michael Hiatt	Retired-Radio Problems
DNF	A	NZL99999	Maximus	New Zealand	Elliott Maxi	30.00	Charles St Clair Brown; Bill Buckley	Retired-Dismasted
DNF	C	6522	Mr Kite	New South Wales	Cape Barrett Kite 40	12.19	Andrew Buckland; Andrew Hunn	Retired-Rigging Problems
DNF	E	RQ68	Ray White Koomooloo	Queensland	Kaufman 41	12.49	Mike Freebairn	Retired-Sunk
DNF	E	S3274	Salona	New South Wales	J&J Yachts Salona 44	11.29	Phillip King	Retired-Steering Failure
