= 2007 Sydney to Hobart Yacht Race =

2007 annual yacht race in Australia

63rd Sydney to Hobart Yacht Race
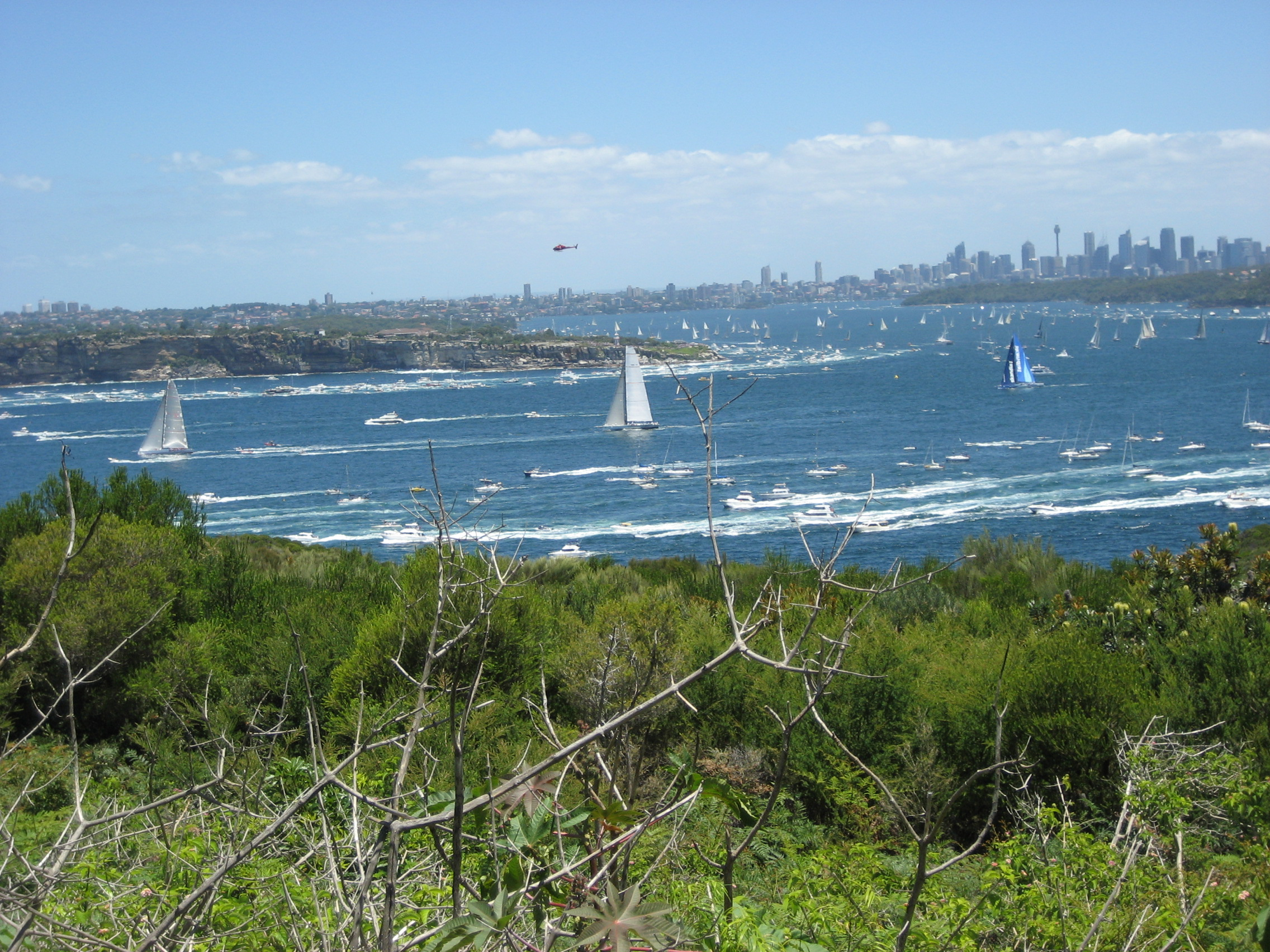
- Wild Oats XI, City Index Leopard, and Skandia going through Sydney Heads

Event information
- Type: Yacht
- Dates: 26–30 December 2007
- Sponsor: Rolex
- Host city: Sydney, Hobart
- Boats: 82
- Distance: 630 nautical miles (1,170 km)
- Website: Website archive

Results
- Winner (2007): Wild Oats XI (Mark Richards)

Succession
- Previous: Wild Oats XI (Mark Richards) in 2006
- Next: Wild Oats XI (Mark Richards) in 2008

The 2007 Sydney to Hobart Yacht Race, sponsored by Rolex, was the 63rd annual running of the "blue water classic" Sydney to Hobart Yacht Race. It was hosted by the Cruising Yacht Club of Australia based in Sydney, New South Wales. As with previous Sydney to Hobart Yacht Races, the 2007 edition began on Sydney Harbour at 1pm on Boxing Day (26 December 2007), before heading south for 630 nautical miles (1,170 km) through the Tasman Sea, past Bass Strait, into Storm Bay and up the River Derwent, to cross the finish line in Hobart, Tasmania.

The 2007 fleet comprised 82 starters, including eight international entries of which 79 completed the race and three yachts retired. Wild Oats XI became only the second yacht in Sydney-Hobart history to take three consecutive wins, the first being Morna (now called Kurrewa IV), skippered by Claude Plowman, who won in 1946, 1947, and 1948. The American yacht, Rosebud won the IRC handicap race and, thus, the Tattersall's Cup as the overall winner of the 2007 race.

== 2007 fleet ==
82 yachts registered to begin the 2007 Sydney to Hobart Yacht race. They are:

Yacht	Nation	Yacht type	Owner	Skipper	Built	Ref
AFR Midnight Rambler	(New South Wales)	Farr 40 Mod	Ed Psaltis	Ed Psaltis	2001	
Alacrity	(Queensland)	Beneteau 44.7	Matthew Percy	Matthew Percy	2004	
Another Challenge	(Victoria (state))	Sydney 38	Chris Lewin	Chris Lewin	2000	
Another Fiasco	(Queensland)	Jutson 43	Damian Suckling	Damian Suckling	1994	
Aurora	(New South Wales)	Farr 40 one off	Jim Holley	Jim Holley	1983	
Balance	(New South Wales)	Sydney 47	Paul Clitheroe	Paul Clitheroe	2006	
Bear Necessity	(New South Wales)	C&C 115	Andrew & Pauline Dally	Andrew Dally	2007	
Berrimilla	(New South Wales)	Brolga 33	Alex Whitworth	Alex Whitworth	1977	
Capriccio of Rhu	(United Kingdom)	Oyster 55	Michele Colenso	Andrew Poole	1987	
Challenge	(Victoria (state))	Sydney 38	Lou Abrahams	Lou Abrahams	2004	
Chutzpah	(Victoria (state))	IRC40	Bruce Taylor	Bruce Taylor	2007	
City Index Leopard	(United Kingdom)		Mike Slade	Mike Slade	2007	
Cougar II	(Victoria (state))	TP 52	Alan Whiteley	Alan Whiteley	2005	
Decosolmarine Sailplane	(United Kingdom)	Beneteau First 47.7	Decosol Marine	John Danby; Robert Bottomley	1999	
Dehler Magic	(Queensland)	Dehler 39	Greg Tobin; Charlie Preen	Greg Tobin; Charlie Preen	2000	
DHL - The Daily Telegraph	(New South Wales)	Volvo Ocean 60	Kookaburra Challenge P/L	Mitch Booth	1997	
Eleni	(New South Wales)	Sydney 38	Tony Levett	Tony Levett	2003	
Endorfin	(New South Wales)	Sydney 47 CR	Peter Mooney	Peter Mooney	2006	
First Light	(New South Wales)	Adams 12	Nicolas Ewald & Susan Rice	Nicolas Ewald	1981	
Flying Fish - Arctos	(New South Wales)	Radford 16.4	Flying Fish Properties	Andy Fairclough; James Dobie	2001	
George Gregan Foundation	(New South Wales)	Volvo Ocean 60	Peter Goldsworthy	David Witt	2001	
Georgia	(Victoria (state))	Farr 53	John Williams; Graeme Ainley	John Williams	2000	
Getaway Sailing 2	(Victoria (state))	Sydney 38	Peter Goldsworthy	Peter Tarimo	2000	
Global Yacht Racing - Kioni	(New South Wales)	Beneteau 47.7	Kioni Sailing Services P/L	Richard Falk	2001	
Goldfinger	(Victoria (state))	Farr 52	Peter Blake & Kate Mitchell	Peter Blake	2002	
Helsal IV	(Tasmania)	Dynamique 62	Tony Fisher	Rob Fisher	1986	
Huckleberry	(Western Australia)	S&S 34	Steve Humphries	Steve Humphries	1982	
Hugo Boss II	(United Kingdom)	Volvo Ocean 60	Alex Thomson Racing	Ross Daniel	2001	
Iataia	(Mexico)	Beneteau 40.7	Marcos Rodriguez	Marc Rosenfeld	2004	
Ichi Ban	(New South Wales)	Jones 70	Matt Allen	Matt Allen	2005	
IMAREX	(New South Wales)	Sydney 38	Marc & Louis Ryckmans	Ola Strand Andersen	2000	
Impeccable	(New South Wales)	Peterson 33	John Walker	John Walker	1980	
Inner Circle	(New South Wales)	Farr 40	Ken Robinson; Darren Cooney	Ken Robinson	1987	
Jazz	(United Kingdom)	J145	Chris Bull	Chris Bull	2003	
Knee Deep	(Western Australia)	Farr 49	Philip Childs; Frank Van Ruth	Philip Childs	1999	
Krakatoa II	(New South Wales)	Pogo 40	Rod Skellet	Rod Skellet	2006	
Limit	(Western Australia)	Corby 49	Alan Brierty	Roger Hickman	2002	
Living Doll	(Victoria (state))	Cookson 50	Michael Hiatt	Michael Hiatt	2005	
Matangi	(Tasmania)	Frers 39	David Stephenson	David Stephenson	1989	
Morna	(New South Wales)	Cavalier 35	Greg Zyner	Greg Zyner	1995	
Mr Beak's Ribs	(New South Wales)	Beneteau First 44.7	David Beak	David Beak	2004	
Mr Kite	(New South Wales)	Mr Kite 40	Andrew Buckland/Andrew Hunn	Andrew Buckland/Andrew Hunn	2005	
Namadgi	(Australian Capital Territory)	Bavaria 44	Canberra Ocean Racing Club	Rick Scott-Murphy	2003	
Noonmark VI	(United Kingdom)		Geoffrey Mulcahy	Mike Gilburt	1998	
Palandri Wines Minds Eye	(Western Australia)	Beneteau 34.7	Brad Skeggs	Brad Skeggs	2006	
Papillon	(New South Wales)	Archambault 40	Phil Molony	Phil Molony	2005	
Patrice Six	(New South Wales)	X-41	Adrian Dunphy	Adrian Dunphy; Tony Kirby		
Phillip's Foote Witchdoctor	(New South Wales)	Ex IOR Two Tonner	The Rum Consortium	Maurie Cameron	1979	
Pirelli	(New South Wales)	Farr 65	Martin James	Les Goodridge	1989	
Pisces	(Tasmania)	Sydney 36	David Taylor	David Taylor	1998	
Pretty Fly II	(New South Wales)	Beneteau 47.7	Colin Woods	Colin Woods	2003	
Pretty Woman	(New South Wales)	IC45 mod	R. Hudson; M. Lockley; R. Murphy	Richard Hudson	1996	
Quantum Racing	(New South Wales)	Cookson 50	Ray Roberts	Ray Roberts	2007	
Quetzalcoatl	(New South Wales)	Jones 40	A. Bruce; Hampshire; J. Lee-Warner; A. Sweetapple	Antony Sweetapple	2001	
Ragamuffin	(New South Wales)	TP 52	Syd Fischer	Syd Fischer	2004	
Rosebud	(United States)	Transpac 65	Roger Sturgeon	Roger Sturgeon	2007	
Rush	(Victoria (state))	Corel 45	Ian Paterson; John Paterson	John Paterson	1997	
Sailors With disABILITIES	(New South Wales)	Lyons 54	David Pescud	David Pescud; John Hearne	2000	
Salona	(New South Wales)	Salona 37	Phillip King	Phillip King	2006	
Scarlet Runner	(Victoria (state))	Sydney 38	Robert Date	Robert Date	2001	
Secret Men's Business #1	(New South Wales)	Murray 42	SMB Syndicate	Ross Trembath; R Curtis	1996	
Sextant	(New South Wales)	X412	Denis Doyle	Denis Doyle	1999	
She	(New South Wales)	Olsen 40	Peter Rodgers	Peter Rodgers	1981	
Sheridan Road Rail (Tartan)	(New South Wales)	Northshore 38	Ian Sanford	Ian Sanford	1984	
Shogun	(Victoria (state))	Rogers 46	Rob Hanna	Rob Hanna	2007	
Skandia	(Victoria (state))	30m Maxi	Grant Wharington	Grant Wharington	2003	
Spirit of Koomooloo	(Queensland)	S&S 49	Mike Freebairn	Mike Freebairn	1968	
Splash Gordon	(Queensland)	Modified Farr 40	Stephen Ellis	Stephen Ellis	1998	
Stormy Petrel	(New South Wales)	S&S 36	Kevin O'Shea	Kevin O'Shea	1970	
Swan Song	(New South Wales)	Swan 48	Geoffrey Hill	Geoffrey Hill	2000	
Swish	(New South Wales)	Sydney 38 OD	Steven Proud	Steven Proud	2001	
The Bigger Picture	(New South Wales)	Sydney 38 OD	Mike Roberts; Anthony Hooper	Ian Douglas	2002	
The Goat	(New South Wales)	Sydney 38 OD	Bruce Foye; Gordon	Bruce Foye	2003	
Toyota Aurion V6	(New South Wales)		Andrew Short	Andrew Short	1993	
True North	(South Australia)	Beneteau First 40.7	Andrew Saies	Andrew Saies	2000	
Wedgetail	(Queensland)	Welbourn 40	Bill Wild	Bill Wild	2005	
Wild Oats XI	(New South Wales)	30m Maxi	Bob Oatley	Mark Richards	2005	
Wot Yot	(New South Wales)	TP 52	Graeme Wood	Graeme Wood	2000	
Wot's Next	(New South Wales)	Sydney 47 CR	Graeme Wood	Bill Sykes	2005	
Yendys	(New South Wales)	Reichel Pugh 55	Geoff Ross	Geoff Ross	2006	
Zen	(New South Wales)	Sydney 38 OD	Gordon Ketelbey	Gordon Ketelbey	2004	
Zephyr	(New South Wales)	Farr 1020	James Connell; Alex Brandon	James Connell	1984	

== Results ==
=== Line Honours ===
Pos	Sail Number	Yacht	State/Country	Yacht Type	LOA (Metres)	Skipper	Elapsed time d:hh:mm:ss
1	10001	Wild Oats XI	New South Wales	Reichel Pugh RP100	30.00	Mark Richards	1:21:24:32
2	GBR1R	City Index Leopard	(United Kingdom) Great Britain	Farr Maxi	29.99	Mike Slade	1:21:51:55
3	AUS 03	Ichi Ban	New South Wales	Jones 70	21.50	Matt Allen	2:05:01:21
4	US60065	Rosebud	United States	Farr STP 65	20.00	Roger Sturgeon	2:06:02:02
5	8899	Quantum Racing	New South Wales	Farr Cookson 50	15.20	Ray Roberts	2:14:12:47
6	1836	Yendys	New South Wales	Reichel Pugh 55	16.80	Geoff Ross	2:14:12:49
7	AUS 70	Ragamuffin	New South Wales	Farr TP 52	15.85	Syd Fischer	2:14:19:41
8	10000	Toyota Aurion V6	New South Wales	Jutson 79	24.08	Andrew Short	2:14:23:16
9	6952	Wot Yot	New South Wales	Nelson Marek TP 52	15.85	Graeme Wood	2:17:01:05
10	M10	Skandia	(Victoria (state)) Victoria	Jones IRC Maxi 98	30.00	Grant Wharington	2:17:23:33
11	GER4014	DHL-The Daily Telegraph	New South Wales	Farr Volvo Ocean 60	19.44	Mitch Booth	2:21:13:01
12	GBR3055	Hugo Boss II	(United Kingdom) Great Britain	Farr Volvo Ocean 60	19.44	Ross Daniel	2:21:13:56
13	R50	Living Doll	(Victoria (state)) Victoria	Farr Cookson 50	15.05	Michael Hiatt	2:21:22:24
14	R33	Chutzpah	(Victoria (state)) Victoria	Reichel Pugh IRC 40	12.35	Bruce Taylor	2:21:35:07
15	NOR2	George Gregan Foundation	New South Wales	Davidson Volvo Ocean 60	19.44	Peter Goldsworthy; David Witt	2:21:42:55
16	SM1000	Georgia	(Victoria (state)) Victoria	Farr 53	16.04	Graeme Ainley; John Williams	2:23:23:29
17	G421	Shogun	(Victoria (state)) Victoria	Rogers 46	14.10	Rob Hanna	2:23:43:18
18	43218	Limit	Western Australia	Corby 49	14.93	Alan Brierty; Roger Hickman	2:23:49:15
19	8880	Goldfinger	(Victoria (state)) Victoria	Farr 52	15.79	Peter Blake; Kate Mitchell	3:01:36:28
20	7878	Sailors With disABILITIES	New South Wales	Lyons 54	16.20	David Pescud; John Hearne	3:01:57:03
21	HW42	Wedgetail	Queensland	Welbourn 42	12.80	Bill Wild	3:02:09:56
22	GBR4519L	Jazz	(United Kingdom) Great Britain	Amel 54	14.64	Chris Bull	3:05:58:41
23	B45	Rush	(Victoria (state)) Victoria	Farr 45	13.81	Ian & John Paterson	3:06:15:09
24	HY1407	Knee Deep	Western Australia	Farr 49	15.28	Philip Childs; Frank Van Ruth	3:07:01:45
25	545	Pretty Woman	New South Wales	Farr IC45 Mod	13.80	Richard Hudson; Michael Lockley; Russell Murphy	3:07:57:17
26	5474	Pirelli	New South Wales	Farr 65	19.72	Martin James; Les Goodridge	3:09:36:44
27	8338	AFR Midnight Rambler	New South Wales	Farr 40	12.41	Ed Psaltis	3:09:48:16
28	GBR5698R	Noonmark VI	(United Kingdom) Great Britain	Frers Swan 56	17.19	Sir Geoffrey Mulcahy	3:10:38:24
29	6559	Wot's Next	New South Wales	Murray Burns Dovell Sydney 47	14.20	Bill Sykes	3:13:24:42
30	8447	Mr Beaks Ribs	New South Wales	Farr Beneteau First 44.7	13.68	David Beak	3:13:40:20
31	7555	Endorfin	New South Wales	Murray Burns Dovell 47	14.33	Peter Mooney	3:14:24:12
32	Q999	Another Fiasco	Queensland	Jutson 43	12.88	Damian Suckling	3:14:38:38
33	7771	Balance	New South Wales	Murray Burns Dovell Sydney 47 CR	14.27	Paul Clitheroe	3:15:33:35
34	6838	Splash Gordon	New South Wales	Farr 40 Mod	12.41	Stephen Ellis	3:15:36:07
35	8448	Swan Song	New South Wales	Frers Swan 48	14.84	Geoffrey Hill	3:15:38:13
36	8924	Pretty Fly II	New South Wales	Farr Beneteau First 47.7	14.80	Colin Woods	3:15:39:59
37	55555	Krakatoa II	New South Wales	Finot Pogo 40	12.19	Rod Skellet	3:15:40:00
38	7027	The Goat	New South Wales	Murray Burns Dovell Sydney 38	11.78	Bruce Foye	3:15:45:22
39	7447	Alacrity	Queensland	Farr Beneteau First 44.7	13.35	Matthew Percy	3:15:51:05
40	3838	Zen	New South Wales	Murray Burns Dovell Sydney 38	11.78	Gordon Ketelbey	3:15:54:16
41	YC5974	True North	South Australia	Farr Beneteau First 40.7	11.92	Andrew Saies	3:18:42:49
42	6068	IMAREX	New South Wales	Murray Burns Dovell Sydney 38	11.78	Ola Strand Andersen; Marc & Louis Ryckmans	3:18:52:46
43	SM2004	Another Challenge	(Victoria (state)) Victoria	Murray Burns Dovell Sydney 38	11.78	Chris Lewin	3:19:04:16
44	SM2	Challenge	(Victoria (state)) Victoria	Murray Burns Dovell Sydney 38	11.78	Lou Abrahams	3:19:14:03
45	6051	The Bigger Picture-KM&T	New South Wales	Murray Burns Dovell Sydney 38	11.78	Mike Roberts; Anthony Hooper; Ian Douglas	3:19:24:32
46	8300	Secret Mens Business #1	New South Wales	Murray 42	12.75	Ross Trembath	3:20:52:57
47	MH60	Eleni	New South Wales	Murray Burns Dovell Sydney 38	11.78	Tony Levett	3:21:56:49
48	360	Patrice Six	New South Wales	Jeppesen X41	12.50	Adrian Dunphy; Tony Kirby	3:22:01:51
49	GBR6612R	Decosolmarine Sailplane	(United Kingdom) Great Britain	Farr Beneteau First 47.7	14.50	John Danby; Robert Bottomley	3:22:50:14
50	6073	Swish	New South Wales	Murray Burns Dovell Sydney 38	11.78	Steven Proud	3:22:59:04
51	6197	Pisces	Tasmania	Murray Burns Dovell Sydney 36	10.97	David Taylor	4:01:38:13
52	6146	Global Yacht Racing-Kioni	New South Wales	Farr Beneteau First 47.7	14.80	Richard Falk	4:01:44:20
53	2170	Spirit of Koomooloo	Queensland	Sparkman & Stephens S&S 48	14.80	Mike Freebairn	4:02:00:38
54	M762	Inner Circle	New South Wales	Farr 40 IOR	12.24	Ken Robinson; Darren Cooney	4:03:54:53
55	633	Dehler Magic	Queensland	Judel Vrolijk Dehler 39	11.79	Greg Tobin; Charlie Preen	4:03:55:28
56	N40	Papillon	New South Wales	Joubert Nivelt Archambault 40	11.99	Phil Molony	4:04:10:21
57	2001	Quetzalcoatl	New South Wales	Jones 40	12.33	Antony Sweetapple	4:04:30:46
58	GB347	Palandri Wines Minds Eye	Western Australia	Farr Beneteau 34.7	9.99	Brad Skeggs	4:04:36:22 ^{1}
59	SM6083	Scarlet Runner	(Victoria (state)) Victoria	Murray Burns Dovell Sydney 38	11.78	Robert Dale	4:04:43:17
60	MEX407	Iataia	Mexico	Farr Beneteau First 40.7	12.17	Marcos Rodriguez; Marc Rosenfeld	4:04:47:48
61	7551	Flying Fish-Arctos	New South Wales	Radford McIntyre 55	16.36	James Dobie; Andy Fairclough	4:04:53:04
62	MH115	Bear Necessity	New South Wales	Jackett C&C 115	11.50	Andrew & Pauline Dally	4:04:57:36
63	C444	Namadgi	Australian Capital Territory	Humphreys Elan 444	13.90	Rick Scott-Murphy	4:05:01:40
64	5350	Matangi	Tasmania	Frers 39	11.78	David Stephenson	4:05:16:00
65	262	Helsal IV	Tasmania	Briand Dynamique 62	18.65	Tony & Ron Fisher	4:05:29:47
66	8289	Zephyr	New South Wales	Farr 1020	10.20	James Connell; Alex Brandon	4:05:30:31
67	9412	Sextant	New South Wales	Jeppesen X412	12.52	Denis Doyle	4:05:37:31
68	6155	Getaway Sailing 2	New South Wales	Murray Burns Dovell Sydney 38	11.78	Peter Tarimo; Jay Pettifer	4:05:46:01
69	2557	Phillip's Foote Witchdoctor	New South Wales	Davidson 42	12.00	Maurie Cameron	4:06:13:42
70	2090	Morna	New South Wales	Radford 12	10.55	Greg Zyner	4:06:48:59
71	4384	First Light	New South Wales	Adams 12	12.20	Nicholas Ewald; Susan Rice	4:07:16:50
72	3846	Sheridan Road Rail (Tartan)	New South Wales	Kaufman Northshore 38	11.62	Ian Sanford	4:07:19:07
73	S3274	Salona	New South Wales	J&J Yachts Salona 44	11.29	Phillip King	4:08:21:46
74	MH106	Impeccable	New South Wales	Peterson 3/4 Tonner IOR	10.20	John Walker	4:08:40:05
75	508	Stormy Petrel	New South Wales	Sparkman & Stephens S&S 36	11.12	Kevin O'Shea	4:08:44:51
76	4924	She	New South Wales	Mull Olsen 40	12.23	Peter Rodgers	4:09:26:53
77	RF116	Huckleberry	Western Australia	Sparkman & Stephens S&S 34	10.10	Steve Humphries	4:10:46:58
78	GBR24R	Capriccio of Rhu	(United Kingdom) Great Britain	Holman & Pye Oyster 55	17.00	Michele Colenso; Andrew Poole	4:11:12:57
79	4057	Aurora	New South Wales	Farr 40 One Off	12.30	Jim Holley	4:15:49:55 ^{2}
DNF	371	Berrimilla	New South Wales	Joubert Brolga 33	10.10	Alex Whitworth	Retired-Spinnaker Wrapped Around the Mast
DNF	SM5200	Cougar II	(Victoria (state)) Victoria	Farr TP 52	15.85	Alan Whiteley	Retired-Damaged Chainplate
DNF	6522	Mr Kite	New South Wales	Cape Barrett Kite 40	12.19	Andrew Buckland; Andrew Hunn	Retired-Broken Rudder

Notes

^1 – Palandri Wines Minds Eye were given a 39 minutes redress to be subtracted off their elapsed time under RRS 62.1 & 64.2 by the International Jury due to an incorrect identification of their yacht on the second start line before the start of the race.
^2 – Aurora was given a 30% penalty to be added onto their elapsed time by the International Jury due to breaching Sailing Instruction 20 (Recalls) by crossing the starting line from the pre-start side to the on course side less than 1 minute before the race started.

=== Overall Handicap ===
Pos	Division	Sail Number	Yacht	State/Country	Yacht Type	LOA (Metres)	Skipper	Corrected time d:hh:mm:ss
1	B	US60065	Rosebud	United States	Farr STP 65	20.00	Roger Sturgeon	3:09:32:14
2	B	AUS 70	Ragamuffin	New South Wales	Farr TP 52	15.85	Syd Fischer	3:10:53:47
3	A	8899	Quantum Racing	New South Wales	Farr Cookson 50	15.20	Ray Roberts	3:11:29:24
4	C	R33	Chutzpah	(Victoria (state)) Victoria	Reichel Pugh IRC 40	12.35	Bruce Taylor	3:12:07:43
5	A	AUS 03	Ichi Ban	New South Wales	Jones 70	21.50	Matt Allen	3:12:53:20
6	A	GBR1R	City Index Leopard	(United Kingdom) Great Britain	Farr Maxi	29.99	Mike Slade	3:13:04:48
7	B	1836	Yendys	New South Wales	Reichel Pugh 55	16.80	Geoff Ross	3:13:40:05
8	A	10001	Wild Oats XI	New South Wales	Reichel Pugh RP100	30.00	Mark Richards	3:14:24:47
9	B	6952	Wot Yot	New South Wales	Nelson Marek TP 52	15.85	Graeme Wood	3:15:07:27
10	C	HW42	Wedgetail	Queensland	Welbourn 42	12.80	Bill Wild	3:17:08:49
11	B	R50	Living Doll	(Victoria (state)) Victoria	Farr Cookson 50	15.05	Michael Hiatt	3:18:15:17
12	C	G421	Shogun	(Victoria (state)) Victoria	Rogers 46	14.10	Rob Hanna	3:18:43:40
13	C	43218	Limit	Western Australia	Corby 49	14.93	Alan Brierty; Roger Hickman	3:19:17:03
14	B	SM1000	Georgia	(Victoria (state)) Victoria	Farr 53	16.04	Graeme Ainley; John Williams	3:21:14:14
15	C	GBR4519L	Jazz	(United Kingdom) Great Britain	Amel 54	14.64	Chris Bull	3:21:48:27
16	B	8880	Goldfinger	(Victoria (state)) Victoria	Farr 52	15.79	Peter Blake; Kate Mitchell	3:23:06:04
17	D	8447	Mr Beaks Ribs	New South Wales	Farr Beneteau First 44.7	13.68	David Beak	3:23:16:03
18	D	8338	AFR Midnight Rambler	New South Wales	Farr 40	12.41	Ed Psaltis	3:23:27:57
19	C	B45	Rush	(Victoria (state)) Victoria	Farr 45	13.81	Ian & John Paterson	3:23:56:15
20	D	7447	Alacrity	Queensland	Farr Beneteau First 44.7	13.35	Matthew Percy	4:00:27:39
21	D	YC5974	True North	South Australia	Farr Beneteau First 40.7	11.92	Andrew Saies	4:00:36:36
22	E	8289	Zephyr	New South Wales	Farr 1020	10.20	James Connell; Alex Brandon	4:01:20:48
23	D	7027	The Goat	New South Wales	Murray Burns Dovell Sydney 38	11.78	Bruce Foye	4:01:24:33
24	D	3838	Zen	New South Wales	Murray Burns Dovell Sydney 38	11.78	Gordon Ketelbey	4:01:34:26
25	C	545	Pretty Woman	New South Wales	Farr IC45 Mod	13.80	Richard Hudson; Michael Lockley; Russell Murphy	4:01:47:05
26	D	8924	Pretty Fly II	New South Wales	Farr Beneteau First 47.7	14.80	Colin Woods	4:01:50:08
27	E	2090	Morna	New South Wales	Radford 12	10.55	Greg Zyner	4:01:59:02
28	E	RF116	Huckleberry	Western Australia	Sparkman & Stephens S&S 34	10.10	Steve Humphries	4:02:14:25
29	D	Q999	Another Fiasco	Queensland	Jutson 43	12.88	Damian Suckling	4:02:46:27
30	C	GBR5698R	Noonmark VI	(United Kingdom) Great Britain	Frers Swan 56	17.19	Sir Geoffrey Mulcahy	4:03:39:50
31	E	508	Stormy Petrel	New South Wales	Sparkman & Stephens S&S 36	11.12	Kevin O'Shea	4:03:49:28
32	D	8448	Swan Song	New South Wales	Frers Swan 48	14.84	Geoffrey Hill	4:04:04:53
33	E	MH106	Impeccable	New South Wales	Peterson 3/4 Tonner IOR	10.20	John Walker	4:04:16:19
34	D	6559	Wot's Next	New South Wales	Murray Burns Dovell Sydney 47	14.20	Bill Sykes	4:04:06:24
35	E	2170	Spirit of Koomooloo	Queensland	Sparkman & Stephens S&S 48	14.80	Mike Freebairn	4:04:21:46
36	C	HY1407	Knee Deep	Western Australia	Farr 49	15.28	Philip Childs; Frank Van Ruth	4:04:50:28
37	D	6068	IMAREX	New South Wales	Murray Burns Dovell Sydney 38	11.78	Ola Strand Andersen; Marc & Louis Ryckmans	4:04:52:34
38	D	SM2004	Another Challenge	(Victoria (state)) Victoria	Murray Burns Dovell Sydney 38	11.78	Chris Lewin	4:05:05:20
39	D	7555	Endorfin	New South Wales	Murray Burns Dovell 47	14.33	Peter Mooney	4:05:15:53
40	D	SM2	Challenge	(Victoria (state)) Victoria	Murray Burns Dovell Sydney 38	11.78	Lou Abrahams	4:05:16:12
41	D	6051	The Bigger Picture-KM&T	New South Wales	Murray Burns Dovell Sydney 38	11.78	Mike Roberts; Anthony Hooper; Ian Douglas	4:05:27:50
42	E	GB347	Palandri Wines Minds Eye	Western Australia	Farr Beneteau 34.7	9.99	Brad Skeggs	4:05:30:42
43	D	6838	Splash Gordon	New South Wales	Farr 40 Mod	12.41	Stephen Ellis	4:05:37:06
44	E	5350	Matangi	Tasmania	Frers 39	11.78	David Stephenson	4:06:41:04
45	D	7771	Balance	New South Wales	Murray Burns Dovell Sydney 47 CR	14.27	Paul Clitheroe	4:06:47:42
46	D	6197	Pisces	Tasmania	Murray Burns Dovell Sydney 36	10.97	David Taylor	4:07:35:04
47	D	MH60	Eleni	New South Wales	Murray Burns Dovell Sydney 38	11.78	Tony Levett	4:08:16:52
48	E	M762	Inner Circle	New South Wales	Farr 40 IOR	12.24	Ken Robinson; Darren Cooney	4:08:48:38
49	D	6073	Swish	New South Wales	Murray Burns Dovell Sydney 38	11.78	Steven Proud	4:09:25:58
50	D	360	Patrice Six	New South Wales	Jeppesen X41	12.50	Adrian Dunphy; Tony Kirby	4:09:52:43
51	D	GBR6612R	Decosolmarine Sailplane	(United Kingdom) Great Britain	Farr Beneteau First 47.7	14.50	John Danby; Robert Bottomley	4:09:55:59
52	D	MH115	Bear Necessity	New South Wales	Jackett C&C 115	11.50	Andrew & Pauline Dally	4:11:01:03
53	E	9412	Sextant	New South Wales	Jeppesen X412	12.52	Denis Doyle	4:11:25:05
54	D	MEX407	Iataia	Mexico	Farr Beneteau First 40.7	12.17	Marcos Rodriguez; Marc Rosenfeld	4:11:33:00
55	D	8300	Secret Mens Business #1	New South Wales	Murray 42	12.75	Ross Trembath	4:11:44:37
56	D	N40	Papillon	New South Wales	Joubert Nivelt Archambault 40	11.99	Phil Molony	4:13:41:20
57	D	6146	Global Yacht Racing-Kioni	New South Wales	Farr Beneteau First 47.7	14.80	Richard Falk	4:13:45:39
58	D	SM6083	Scarlet Runner	(Victoria (state)) Victoria	Murray Burns Dovell Sydney 38	11.78	Robert Dale	4:15:48:03
59	D	6155	Getaway Sailing 2	New South Wales	Murray Burns Dovell Sydney 38	11.78	Peter Tarimo; Jay Pettifer	4:16:57:41
60	A	M10	Skandia	(Victoria (state)) Victoria	Jones IRC Maxi 98	30.00	Grant Wharington	4:18:57:36
61	D	2001	Quetzalcoatl	New South Wales	Jones 40	12.33	Antony Sweetapple	4:21:17:54
62	E	4057	Aurora	New South Wales	Farr 40 One Off	12.30	Jim Holley	4:21:18:41
DNF	E	371	Berrimilla	New South Wales	Joubert Brolga 33	10.10	Alex Whitworth	Retired-Spinnaker Wrapped Around the Mast
DNF	B	SM5200	Cougar II	(Victoria (state)) Victoria	Farr TP 52	15.85	Alan Whiteley	Retired-Damaged Chainplate
DNF	C	6522	Mr Kite	New South Wales	Cape Barrett Kite 40	12.19	Andrew Buckland; Andrew Hunn	Retired-Broken Rudder
