= 2005 Sydney to Hobart Yacht Race =

2005 annual yacht race in Australia

61st Sydney to Hobart Yacht Race
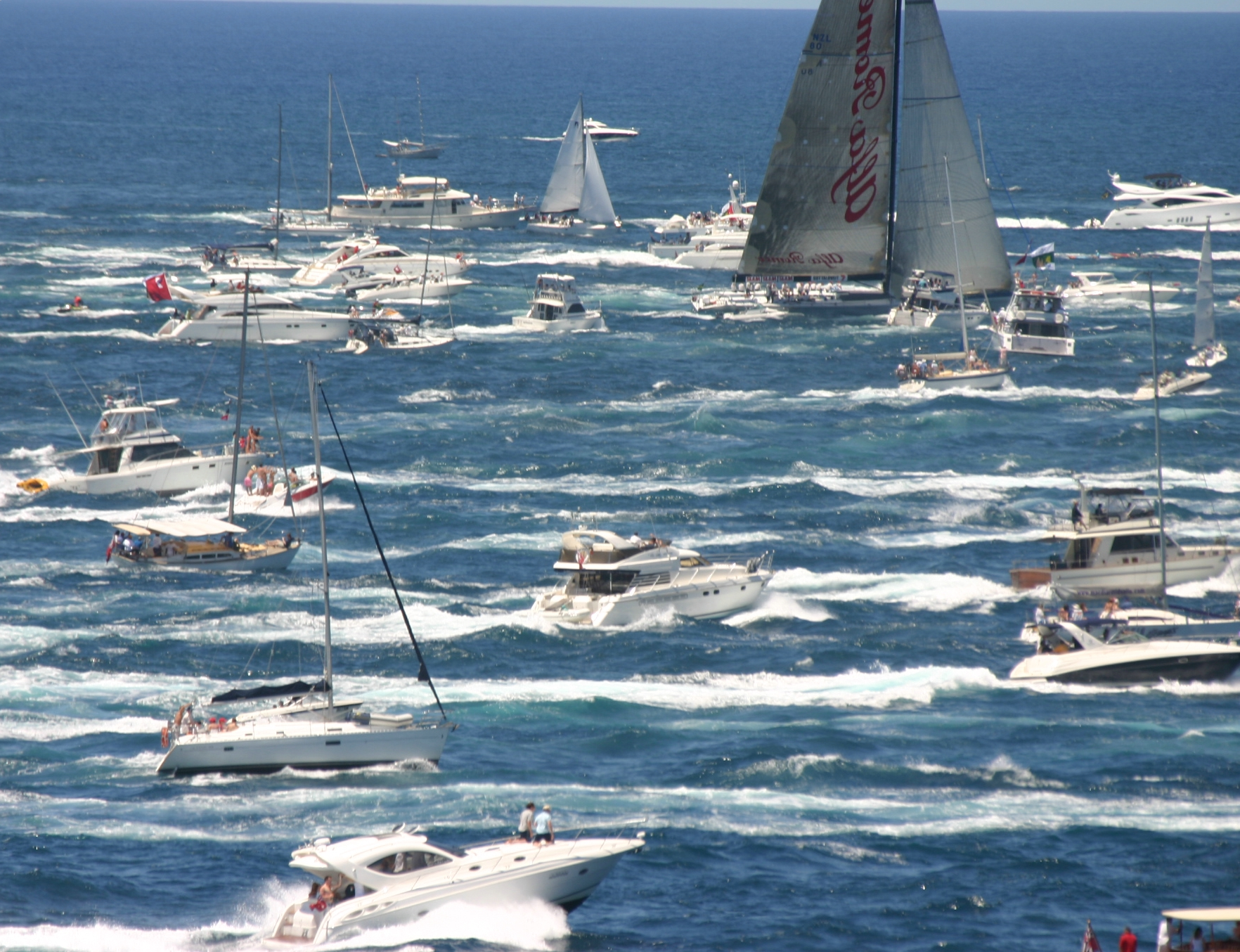

Event information
- Type: Yacht
- Dates: 26 December 2005 – 2 January 2006
- Sponsor: Rolex
- Host city: Sydney, Hobart
- Boats: 85
- Distance: 630 nautical miles (1,170 km)
- Website: Website archive

Results
- Winner (2005): Wild Oats XI (Mark Richards)

Succession
- Previous: Nicorette III (Ludde Ingvall) in 2004
- Next: Wild Oats XI (Mark Richards) in 2006

The 2005 Sydney to Hobart Yacht Race, sponsored by Rolex, was the 61st annual running of the "blue water classic" Sydney to Hobart Yacht Race. As in past editions of the race, it was hosted by the Cruising Yacht Club of Australia based in Sydney, New South Wales. The 2005 edition began on Sydney Harbour at 1:20pm on Boxing Day (26 December 2005), before heading south for 630 nautical miles (1,170 km) through the Tasman Sea, past Bass Strait, into Storm Bay and up the River Derwent, to cross the finish line in Hobart, Tasmania.

The 2005 fleet comprised 85 starters of which 80 completed the race and five yachts retired.

== Results ==
=== Line Honours ===
Pos	Sail Number	Yacht	State/Country	Yacht Type	LOA (Metres)	Skipper	Elapsed time d:hh:mm:ss
1	10001	Wild Oats XI	New South Wales	Reichel Pugh RP100	30.00	Mark Richards	1:18:40:10
2	NZL80	Alfa Romeo	New Zealand	Reichel Pugh Maxi	30.00	Neville Crichton	1:19:56:31
3	M10	Skandia	(Victoria (state)) Victoria	Jones IRC Maxi 98	30.00	Grant Wharington	2:00:25:57
4	NZL10001	Konica Minolta	New Zealand	Bakewell-White Maxi 30m	30.00	Stewart Thwaites	2:01:26:41
5	AUS11111	AAPT	New South Wales	Simonis Voogd Maxi	27.38	Sean Langman	2:04:22:11
6	60000	Loki	New South Wales	Reichel Pugh 60	18.29	Stephen Ainsworth	2:11:59:36
7	A99	Coogans Stores	Tasmania	Dovell MBD Open 66	20.03	Duncan Hine	2:12:07:58
8	8844	Seriously 10	New South Wales	Davidson Volvo Ocean 60	19.46	John Woodruff	2:12:33:10
9	GBR 99	Hugo Boss	(United Kingdom) Great Britain	Lombard Open 60	18.28	Alex Thompson	2:12:54:50
10	NOR2	ABN AMRO	New South Wales	Davidson Volvo Ocean 60	19.46	Andrew Short	2:13:14:00
11	IRL5005	Chieftain	(Republic of Ireland) Ireland	Farr Cookson 50	15.05	Gerard O'Rourke	2:15:18:10
12	R50	Living Doll	(Victoria (state)) Victoria	Farr Cookson 50	15.05	Michael Hiatt	2:17:01:33
13	1836	Yendys	New South Wales	Judel Vrolijk JV52	15.75	Geoff Ross	2:17:29:29
14	YC3300	Hardy's Secret Mens Business	South Australia	Reichel Pugh 46	14.21	Geoff Boettcher	2:17:57:22
15	H1	Heaven Can Wait	Queensland	Welbourn 50	15.19	Peter Hollis	2:17:58:13
16	SM4321R	Flirt	(Victoria (state)) Victoria	Corby 49	14.93	Chris Dare	2:19:27:10
17	8880	Goldfinger	(Victoria (state)) Victoria	Farr 52	15.79	Peter Blake	2:19:41:01
18	YC560	Pale Ale Rager	South Australia	Elliott 56	17.10	Gary Shanks	2:21:01:53
19	HW42	Wedgetail	Queensland	Welbourn 42	12.80	Bill Wild	2:21:08:40
20	AUS70	Ragamuffin	New South Wales	Farr 50	15.50	Syd Fischer	2:21:21:56
21	AUS8889	Quantum Racing	New South Wales	Mills DK46	14.10	Ray Roberts	2:21:30:56
22	G162	Prowler	(Victoria (state)) Victoria	Elliott 47	14.41	Christian Jackson	2:22:48:13
23	6559	Wot's Next	New South Wales	Murray Burns Dovell Sydney 47	14.20	Graeme Wood	2:22:48:38
24	G4646	Shogun	(Victoria (state)) Victoria	Mills DK46	14.10	Rob Hanna	3:00:39:35
25	7878	Kaz	New South Wales	Lyons 54	16.20	David Pescud	3:01:11:14
26	SM46	Dekadence	(Victoria (state)) Victoria	Mills DK46	14.10	Philip Coombs	3:01:43:18
27	B45	Rush	(Victoria (state)) Victoria	Farr 45	13.81	Ian & John Paterson	3:02:48:37
28	8338	AFR Midnight Rambler	New South Wales	Farr 40	12.41	Ed Psaltis	3:04:29:42
29	6419	Pekljus	New South Wales	Radford 50	15.24	David Ferrall	3:06:06:34
30	G147	Ocean Skins	(Victoria (state)) Victoria	Inglis 47	14.30	Tony Fowler	3:06:48:47
31	R69	Fuzzy Logic	(Victoria (state)) Victoria	Murray Burns Dovell ILC 40	12.48	Paul Roberts; Bill Lennon	3:07:53:05
32	SM447	Cougar	(Victoria (state)) Victoria	Farr Beneteau 44.7	13.68	Alan Whiteley	3:07:55:20
33	SM2	Challenge	(Victoria (state)) Victoria	Murray Burns Dovell Sydney 38	11.78	Lou Abrahams	3:09:23:56
34	R33	Chutzpah	(Victoria (state)) Victoria	Murray Burns Dovell Sydney 38	11.78	Bruce Taylor	3:09:48:17
35	AUS6606	Quest	Tasmania	Nelson Marek 46	14.19	Anthony Nicholas	3:09:49:32
36	8402	Fincorp More Witchcraft	New South Wales	Dibley 46	13.95	John Cameron	3:11:03:18
37	7447	Prime Time	New South Wales	Wauquiez C45S	13.68	David Mason	3:12:23:00
38	4343	Wild Rose	New South Wales	Farr 43	13.11	Roger Hickman	3:14:15:50
39	6073	Swish	New South Wales	Murray Burns Dovell Sydney 38	11.78	Steven Proud	3:14:16:40
40	8924	Pretty Fly II	New South Wales	Farr Beneteau First 47.7	14.80	Colin Woods	3:14:23:52
41	M6	Tow Truck	New South Wales	Farr Mumm 30	9.43	Anthony Paterson	3:14:39:42
42	MH60	Horwarth BRI	New South Wales	Murray Burns Dovell Sydney 38	11.78	Tony Levett	3:15:07:23
43	6081	Dodo	New South Wales	Murray Burns Dovell Sydney 38	11.78	Adrian Dunphy	3:15:10:32
44	6285	Sea Quest	New South Wales	Radford 50	15.18	Geoff Smith	3:15:38:28
45	RQ2001	Sweethart	Queensland	Jutson 39	11.87	Antony Love	3:15:44:57
46	2999	Savcor	Sweden	Murray Burns Dovell Sydney 38	11.78	Peter Westerlund	3:16:05:17
47	3838	Zen	New South Wales	Murray Burns Dovell Sydney 38	11.78	Gordon Ketelbey	3:16:39:39
48	S16	Addiction	(Victoria (state)) Victoria	Inglis 37	11.62	Richard McGarvie; Peter Davidson	3:16:51:59
49	5985	Torpan International	New South Wales	Kaufman Jutson NSX 38	11.63	Gill Whitton	3:17:49:22
50	8301	Cadenza	New South Wales	Farr 50	15.20	Gunnar & Ulli Tuisk	3:17:54:15
51	9797	Hidden Agenda	New South Wales	Murray Burns Dovell Sydney 38	11.78	Graham Gibson; Ross Trembath	3:17:58:42
52	7008	Inon	New South Wales	Farr Beneteau 64	19.52	Bruce Gray	3:18:05:42
53	6565	Team Lexus	New South Wales	Murray Burns Dovell Sydney 38	11.78	Frank Sticovich	3:18:30:15
54	6469	White Hot XSI	New South Wales	Bakewell-White F36 Razor	11.00	Warren Cottis	3:18:36:01
55	6146	Kioni	New South Wales	Farr Beneteau First 47.7	14.54	Andrew Lygo	3:19:12:05
56	R1111	Toecutter	(Victoria (state)) Victoria	Hick 31	9.15	Robert Hick	3:19:28:01
57	6351	Game Set	New South Wales	Peterson Bavaria Match 38	11.30	Stephen Roach	3:19:38:19
58	7407	Chancellor	New South Wales	Farr Beneteau First 40.7	11.92	Ted Tooher	3:20:54:51
59	A121	Jailhouse Grill	Tasmania	Adams 13	13.18	Jason Van Zetten; Mark Koppelmann	3:22:50:31
60	RQ68	Ray White Koomooloo	Queensland	Kaufman 41	12.49	Mike Freebairn	3:22:52:32
61	M762	Inner Circle	New South Wales	Farr 40 IOR	12.24	Michael Graham; Darren Cooney	3:22:57:44
62	F308	Balance	Western Australia	Lidgard 35	10.74	Rolf Heidecker	4:00:04:48
63	R63	Toll Shipping Prion	(Victoria (state)) Victoria	Lyons Modified Mount Gay 30	9.59	Michael Dolphin	4:00:10:36
64	TYC250	Apollonius	Tasmania	Robinson 41	12.60	Julian Robinson	4:01:11:18
65	SM117	Tilting at Windmills	(Victoria (state)) Victoria	Joubert Modified 42	12.83	Thorry Gunnersen	4:04:04:14
66	2557	Phillip's Foote Witchdoctor	New South Wales	Davidson 42	12.00	Maurie Cameron	4:04:05:45
67	M666	Lucifarr	New South Wales	Farr 40	12.28	Mark Davies	4:04:10:52
68	6388	Namadgi	Australian Capital Territory	Humphreys Elan 444	13.95	Garth Brice	4:04:12:09
69	4057	Aurora	New South Wales	Farr 40 One Off	12.30	Jim Holley	4:04:13:35
70	1124	Farr South	Tasmania	Farr 36	11.16	Ian Hall	4:05:31:20
71	SA98	Renegade	South Australia	Holland 40	12.60	Robert Francis	4:05:34:28
72	1987	Flying Fish BMS	New South Wales	Peterson 51	15.50	Randal Wilson; Hugh O'Neill	4:05:44:34
73	6520	Diomeada	New South Wales	Van de Stadt 48	14.50	David & Andrea McKay	4:06:17:44
74	4924	She	New South Wales	Mull Olsen 40	12.23	Peter Rodgers	4:06:31:18
75	508	Stormy Petrel	New South Wales	Sparkman & Stephens S&S 36	11.12	Kevin O'Shea	4:06:31:37
76	MH106	Impeccable	New South Wales	Peterson 3/4 Tonner IOR	10.20	John Walker	4:06:40:01
77	5776	Isabella	New South Wales	Kaufman Northshore 380 Sports	11.63	John Nolan	5:00:28:49
78	5527	Polaris of Belmont	New South Wales	Cole 43	13.20	Chris Dawe	5:01:08:30
79	371	Berrimilla	New South Wales	Joubert Brolga 33	10.10	Alex Whitworth	5:02:34:47
80	C2	Gillawa	Australian Capital Territory	Salthouse Cavalier 975	9.76	David Kent	7:10:23:57
DNF	505008	Conergy	Germany	Beale 45	13.85	Dirk Wiegmann; Neil Gray	Retired-Rudder & Radio Problems
DNF	R6572	Icefire	(Victoria (state)) Victoria	Mummery 45	13.85	Jeff Otter; Gary Caulfield	Retired-Rig Damage
DNF	NZL 2716	Nevenka	New Zealand	Townson 36	10.97	Pete Mummery; Phil Chisholm	Retired-Lack of Wind
DNF	8447	Sirromet Life Style Wine	New South Wales	Farr Beneteau First 44.7	13.68	Michael Spies; David Beak	Retired-Rig Damage
DNF	6068	Star Dean-Willcocks	New South Wales	Murray Burns Dovell Sydney 38	11.78	Ola Andersen; Marc & Louis Ryckmans	Retired-Rig Problems

=== Overall Handicap ===
Pos	Division	Sail Number	Yacht	State/Country	Yacht Type	LOA (Metres)	Skipper	Corrected time d:hh:mm:ss
1	A	10001	Wild Oats XI	New South Wales	Reichel Pugh RP100	30.00	Mark Richards	3:03:54:32
2	A	NZL80	Alfa Romeo	New Zealand	Reichel Pugh Maxi	30.00	Neville Crichton	3:04:43:21
3	A	NZL10001	Konica Minolta	New Zealand	Bakewell-White Maxi 30m	30.00	Stewart Thwaites	3:09:29:06
4	B	IRL5005	Chieftain	(Republic of Ireland) Ireland	Farr Cookson 50	15.00	Gerard O'Rourke	3:10:48:00
5	A	M10	Skandia	(Victoria (state)) Victoria	Jones IRC Maxi 98	30.00	Grant Wharingtonn	3:11:24:03
6	B	HW42	Wedgetail	Queensland	Welbourn 42	12.80	Bill Wild	3:11:35:44
7	B	60000	Loki	New South Wales	Reichel Pugh 60	18.29	Stephen Ainsworth	3:11:45:02
8	B	YC3300	Hardy's Secret Mens Business	South Australia	Reichel Pugh 46	14.21	Geoff Boettcher	3:11:45:51
9	B	AUS8889	Quantum Racing	New South Wales	Mills DK46	14.10	Ray Roberts	3:11:45:58
10	D	6559	Wot's Next	New South Wales	Murray Burns Dovell Sydney 47	14.20	Graeme Wood	3:11:50:23
11	B	R50	Living Doll	(Victoria (state)) Victoria	Farr Cookson 50	15.05	Michael Hiatt	3:12:32:01
12	B	1836	Yendys	New South Wales	Judel Vrolijk JV52	15.75	Geoff Ross	3:13:16:11
13	B	H1	Heaven Can Wait	Queensland	Welbourn 50	15.19	Peter Hollis	3:13:17:58
14	B	SM4321R	Flirt	(Victoria (state)) Victoria	Corby 49	14.93	Chris Dare	3:14:00:08
15	B	AUS70	Ragamuffin	New South Wales	Farr 50	15.50	Syd Fischer	3:15:03:14
16	B	G4646	Shogun	(Victoria (state)) Victoria	Mills DK46	14.10	Rob Hanna	3:15:42:01
17	D	SM447	Cougar	(Victoria (state)) Victoria	Farr Beneteau 44.7	13.68	Alan Whiteley	3:15:45:17
18	B	YC560	Pale Ale Rager	South Australia	Elliott 56	17.10	Gary Shanks	3:16:17:28
19	B	SM46	Dekadence	(Victoria (state)) Victoria	Mills DK46	14.10	Philip Coombs	3:16:45:39
20	B	8880	Goldfinger	(Victoria (state)) Victoria	Farr 52	15.79	Peter Blake	3:17:04:18
21	D	8338	AFR Midnight Rambler	New South Wales	Farr 40	12.41	Ed Psaltis	3:17:11:35
22	E	RQ68	Ray White Koomooloo	Queensland	Kaufman 41	12.49	Mike Freebairn	3:17:16:40
23	A	AUS11111	AAPT	New South Wales	Simonis Voogd Maxi	27.38	Sean Langman	3:18:01:25
24	D	R69	Fuzzy Logic	(Victoria (state)) Victoria	Murray Burns Dovell ILC 40	12.48	Paul Roberts; Bill Lennon	3:18:01:48
25	C	SM2	Challenge	(Victoria (state)) Victoria	Murray Burns Dovell Sydney 38	11.78	Lou Abrahams	3:18:30:56
26	A	A99	Coogans Stores	Tasmania	Dovell MBD Open 66	20.03	Duncan Hine	3:18:51:38
27	C	R33	Chutzpah	(Victoria (state)) Victoria	Murray Burns Dovell Sydney 38	11.78	Bruce Taylor	3:18:58:01
28	E	4343	Wild Rose	New South Wales	Farr 43	13.11	Roger Hickman	3:19:00:30
29	A	GBR 99	Hugo Boss	(United Kingdom) Great Britain	Lombard Open 60	18.28	Alex Thompson	3:19:29:34
30	B	B45	Rush	(Victoria (state)) Victoria	Farr 45	13.81	Ian & John Paterson	3:19:29:35
31	D	7447	Prime Time	New South Wales	Wauquiez C45S	13.68	David Mason	3:21:45:00
32	D	M6	Tow Truck	New South Wales	Farr Mumm 30	9.43	Anthony Paterson	3:22:06:52
33	E	R1111	Toecutter	(Victoria (state)) Victoria	Hick 31	9.15	Robert Hick	3:23:24:00
34	C	6073	Swish	New South Wales	Murray Burns Dovell Sydney 38	11.78	Steven Proud	3:23:56:27
35	D	RQ2001	Sweethart	Queensland	Jutson 39	11.87	Antony Love	4:00:10:23
36	C	MH60	Horwarth BRI	New South Wales	Murray Burns Dovell Sydney 38	11.78	Tony Levett	4:00:52:51
37	E	508	Stormy Petrel	New South Wales	Sparkman & Stephens S&S 36	11.12	Kevin O'Shea	4:01:42:29
38	D	6081	Dodo	New South Wales	Murray Burns Dovell Sydney 38	11.78	Adrian Dunphy	4:01:43:26
39	C	2999	Savcor	Sweden	Murray Burns Dovell Sydney 38	11.78	Peter Westerlund	4:01:57:14
40	D	6351	Game Set	New South Wales	Peterson Bavaria Match 38	11.30	Stephen Roach	4:02:03:12
41	B	AUS6606	Quest	Tasmania	Nelson Marek 46	14.19	Anthony Nicholas	4:02:06:32
42	D	8924	Pretty Fly II	New South Wales	Farr Beneteau First 47.7	14.80	Colin Woods	4:02:08:52
43	D	6469	White Hot XSI	New South Wales	Bakewell-White F36 Razor	11.00	Warren Cottis	4:02:23:31
44	C	6469	White Hot XSI	New South Wales	Bakewell-White F36 Razor	11.00	Warren Cottis	4:02:35:27
45	E	7407	Chancellor	New South Wales	Farr Beneteau First 40.7	11.92	Ted Tooher	4:02:51:38
46	E	MH106	Impeccable	New South Wales	Peterson 3/4 Tonner IOR	10.20	John Walker	4:03:16:44
47	C	9797	Hidden Agenda	New South Wales	Murray Burns Dovell Sydney 38	11.78	Graham Gibson; Ross Trembath	4:04:03:21
48	D	S16	Addiction	(Victoria (state)) Victoria	Inglis 37	11.62	Richard McGarvie; Peter Davidson	4:04:30:28
49	C	6565	Team Lexus	New South Wales	Murray Burns Dovell Sydney 38	11.78	Frank Sticovich	4:04:38:26
50	E	M762	Inner Circle	New South Wales	Farr 40 IOR	12.24	Michael Graham; Darren Cooney	4:04:45:18
51	D	F308	Balance	Western Australia	Lidgard 35	10.74	Rolf Heidecker	4:07:22:55
52	D	R63	Toll Shipping Prion	(Victoria (state)) Victoria	Lyons Modified Mount Gay 30	9.59	Michael Dolphin	4:07:23:24
53	E	1124	Farr South	Tasmania	Farr 36	11.16	Ian Hall	4:08:40:10
54	E	SA98	Renegade	South Australia	Holland 40	12.60	Robert Francis	4:09:19:58
55	E	4057	Aurora	New South Wales	Farr 40 One Off	12.30	Jim Holley	4:09:32:18
56	D	TYC250	Apollonius	Tasmania	Robinson 41	12.60	Julian Robinson	4:10:01:57
57	E	371	Berrimilla	New South Wales	Joubert Brolga 33	10.10	Alex Whitworth	4:13:13:07
58	D	M666	Lucifarr	New South Wales	Farr 40	12.28	Mark Davies	4:13:17:51
59	E	M666	Lucifarr	New South Wales	Farr 40	12.28	Mark Davies	4:22:21:19
60	E	5776	Isabella	New South Wales	Kaufman Northshore 380 Sports	11.63	John Nolan	5:03:51:13
DNF	D	8447	Sirromet Life Style Wine	New South Wales	Farr Beneteau First 44.7	13.68	Michael Spies; David Beak	Retired-Rig Damage
DNF	C	6068	Star Dean-Willcocks	New South Wales	Murray Burns Dovell Sydney 38	11.78	Ola Andersen; Marc & Louis Ryckmans	Retired-Rig Problems
