= 2008 Sydney to Hobart Yacht Race =

2008 annual yacht race in Australia

64th Sydney to Hobart Yacht Race
Event information
- Type: Yacht
- Dates: 26–31 December 2008
- Sponsor: Rolex
- Host city: Sydney, Hobart
- Boats: 100
- Distance: 630 nautical miles (1,170 km)
- Website: Website archive

Results
- Winner (2008): Wild Oats XI (Mark Richards)

Succession
- Previous: Wild Oats XI (Mark Richards) in 2007
- Next: Alfa Romeo II (Neville Crichton) in 2009

The 2008 Sydney to Hobart Yacht Race, sponsored by Rolex and hosted by Cruising Yacht Club of Australia in Sydney, New South Wales, was the 64th annual running of the "blue water classic" Sydney to Hobart Yacht Race. The 2008 edition began on Sydney Harbour, at 1pm on Boxing Day (26 December 2008), before heading south for 630 nautical miles (1,170 km) through the Tasman Sea, past Bass Strait, into Storm Bay and up the River Derwent, to cross the finish line in Hobart, Tasmania. This marked the 10 year anniversary of the 1998 Sydney to Hobart Yacht Race, during which 6 sailors died due to a major storm.

The 2008 fleet comprised 100 starters; 92 finished. By placing first in line honours, Wild Oats XI became the first yacht to claim fourth consecutive line titles, beating the previous record held by Morna (later Kurrewa IV) of three consecutive line honours victories (1946, 1947 and 1948). Skipper Bob Steel and his yacht Quest won the Tattersall's Cup as the overall handicap winner.

== 2008 fleet ==
116 entered to participant and 100 started in the 2008 Sydney to Hobart Yacht race. They were:

Yacht	Nation	Type	Owner	Skipper	Launch year	Ref
41-Sud	(New Caledonia)	Armchambault 40	Jean-Luc Esplaas	Jean-Luc Esplaas	2006	
Abracadabra	(New South Wales)	Tripp 47	James Murchison	James Murchison	1992	
AFR Midnight Rambler	(New South Wales)	Farr 40 mod	Ed Psaltis; Bob Thomas	Ed Psaltis	2001	
ASM Brindabella	(New South Wales)	Jutson 79	Andrew Short	Peter Baker	1993	
ASM Shockwave	(New South Wales)	Reichel/Pugh 80	Andrew Short	Andrew Short	2000	
Audacious	(Victoria (state))	Sydney 38	Greg Clinnick; Paul Holden	Greg Clinnick	2002	
Audi Centre Melbourne	(Victoria (state))	Corby 49	Chris Dare	Chris Dare	2007	
Aurora	(New South Wales)	Farr 40 - one off	Jim Holley; Mary Holley	Jim Holley	1983	
Bacardi	(Victoria (state))	Peterson 44	Martin Power	Martin Power	1978	
Balance	(New South Wales)	Sydney 47	Paul Clitheroe	Paul Clitheroe	2006	
Black Jack (previously Stark Raving Mad)	(Queensland)	IRC maxi yacht	Peter Harburg	Mark Bradford	2005	
Broadsword	(Queensland)	Archambault 40	Simon Wood	Simon Wood	2006	
Chance of Shenval	(Victoria (state))	Farr 40 one off	Robert Green	Robert Green	1989	
Chancellor	(New South Wales)	Beneteau First 40.7	Ted Tooher	Ted Tooher	2000	
Charlie's Dream	(Queensland)	Bluewater 450	Peter Lewis	Peter Lewis	2008	
Chutzpah	(Victoria (state))	IRC 40	Bruce Taylor	Bruce Taylor	2007	
Copernicus	(New South Wales)	Radford 12m	Greg Zyner	J Nixon	2008	
CHorse	(New South Wales)	Cavalier 350SL	John Smith	John Smith	1998	
Cougar II	(Victoria (state))	TP 52	Alan Whiteley	Alan Whiteley		
Doctel Rager	(South Australia)	Elliott 56	Gary Shanks	Gary Shanks	1987	
Dream Lover	(Queensland)	MBD 40	Rick Morgan	Rick Morgan	2006	
Dormit/INSX	(Victoria (state))	NSX 38	Julian Sill; Robert Sill	Robert Sill	1994	
Eleni	(New South Wales)	Sydney 38	Tony Levett	Tony Levett	2003	
Finistere	(Western Australia)	Davidson 50	Robert Thomas	Robert Thomas	1991	
Flying Fish Arctos	(New South Wales)	Radford 16.4	Flying Fish Australia	Andy Fairclough	2001	
Getaway-Sailing.com	(New South Wales)	Volvo Ocean 60	Peter Goldsworthy	Peter Goldsworthy	2001	
Getaway Sailing 2	(New South Wales)	Sydney 38	Peter Goldsworthy	Jay Pettifer	2001	
Georgia	(Victoria (state))	Farr 53	John Williams; Graeme Ainley	John Williams	2000	
Goldfinger	(Victoria (state))	Farr 52	Peter Blake; Kate Mitchell	Peter Blake	2002	
Helsal III	(Tasmania)	Adams 20	Tony Fisher; Rob Fisher	Rob Fisher	1984	
Helsal IV	(Tasmania)	Dynamique 62	Tony Fisher; Sally Smith	Sally Smith	1986	
Ichi Ban	(New South Wales)	Jones 70	Matt Allen	Matt Allen	2005	
Inca	(New South Wales)	Vickers 41	Noel Sneddon	Noel Sneddon	1999	
Impeccable	(New South Wales)	Peterson 33	John Walker	John Walker	1980	
Inner Circle	(New South Wales)	Farr 40 IOR	Ken Robinson; Darren Cooney	Ken Robinson	1987	
Isabella	(New South Wales)	Hanse 400E	John Nolan	John Nolan	2007	
J Steel (Yeah Baby)	(New South Wales)	Sydney 38	Louis Ryckmans; Marc Ryckmans	Marc Ryckmans	2000	
Jazz Player	(Victoria (state))	Bakewell-White Z39	Andrew Lawrence	Andrew Lawrence	2004	
Jus'Do It 3	(Scotland)	Beneteau First 47.7	Ian Darby	Ian Darby	2005	
Kioni-Global Yachtracing	(United Kingdom)	Beneteau 47.7	Global Yacht Racing	A Middleton	2001	
Krakatoa II	(New South Wales)	Pogo 40	Rod Skellet	Rod Skellet	2005	
Lady Courrier	(France)	Beneteau First 45	Gery Trentesaux	Gery Trentesaux	2005	
Leukaemia Foundation	(New South Wales)	Sydney 38	Richard Holstein; Stewart Kellie	Richard Holstein	2000	
Limit	(New South Wales)	Reichel Pugh 62	Alan Brierty	Roger Hickman	2008	
Lloyds Brokers - Too Impetuous	(Queensland)	Holland 43	Rudy Weber	Rudy Weber	1981	
Loki	(New South Wales)	Reichel/Pugh 63	Stephen Ainsworth	Stephen Ainsworth	2008	
Mahligai	(New South Wales)	Sydney 46	Murray Owens; Jenny Kings	Murray Owens	1998	
Maluka of Kermandie	(Tasmania)	Classic gaff rigger	Sean Langman	Sean Langman	1932	
Morris Finance Cinquante	(Victoria (state))	Sydney 38	Ian Murray	Ian Murray	2002	
Mr Beak's Ribs	(New South Wales)	Beneteau First 44.7	David Beak	David Beak	2004	
Mustang Sally	(Western Australia)	Farr 46	Warren Batt	Warren Batt	1988	
Nest Property	(Tasmania)	Traditional 30	Murray Wilkes	Murray Wilkes	1984	
Obsession	(New South Wales)	Sydney 38 Mod	Obsession Syndicate	Andrew Lygo	2000	
One for the Road	(New South Wales)	Northshore 37	Kym Butler	Kym Butler	2003	
Optimus Prime	(Western Australia)	Marten 49	Trevor Taylor	Trevor Taylor	2008	
Pachamama	(Switzerland)	Nivelt 50	Dario Schwoerer	Dario Schwoerer	2000	
Pale Ale Raging	(South Australia)	Elliott 56	Gary Shanks	Gary Shanks		
Papillon	(New South Wales)	Archembault 40	Phil Molony	Phil Molony	2005	
Patrice Six	(New South Wales)	X-41	Tony Kirby	Tony Kirby	2007	
Pinta-M	(Netherlands)	S&S 41	Atse Blei	Atse Blei	1972	
Pippin	(Queensland)	Farr 37	Roger Sayers	Roger Sayers	1984	
Pirelli	(New South Wales)	Farr 65	Les Goodridge	Les Goodridge	1989	
Pisces	(Tasmania)	Sydney 36	David Taylor	David Taylor	1998	
PLA Loma IV	(New South Wales)	DK 43	Rob Reynolds	Rob Reynolds	2002	
Polaris of Belmont	(New South Wales)	Cole 43	Chris Dawe	Chris Dawe	1970	
Quantum Racing	(New South Wales)	Cookson 50	Ray Roberts	Ray Roberts	2006	
Quest	(New South Wales)	TP 52	Bob Steel	Bob Steel	2005	
Quetzalcoatl	(New South Wales)	Jones 40	Antony Sweetapple	Antony Sweetapple	2001	
Ragamuffin	(New South Wales)	TP 52	Syd Fischer	Syd Fischer	2004	
Ragtime	(United States)	Spencer 65	Chris Welsh; Ragtime LLC	Chris Welsh	1965	
Ray White Spirit of Koomooloo	(Queensland)	S&S 49	Mike Freebairn; Don Freebairn	Mike Freebairn	1968	
Rush	(Victoria (state))	Corel 45	Ian Paterson; John Paterson	John Paterson	1996	
Sailors with disABILITIES	(New South Wales)	Lyons 54	David Pescud	David Pescud	2000	
Salona	(New South Wales)	Salona 37	Phillip King	Phillip King	2006	
Sanyo Maris	(New South Wales)	Tasman Seabird	Tiare Tomaszewski; John Green; Ian Kiernan; Ben Hawke	Ian Kiernan	1958	
Seahold Perie Banou II	(Western Australia)	S&S 39	Jon Sanders	Jon Sanders	1971	
Secret Mens Business #1	(Western Australia)	Murray 42	Rob Curtis; Ross Trembath; Doug Snedden	Ross Trembath	1996	
Secret Mens Business 3	(South Australia)	Reichel/Pugh 47	Geoffrey Boettcher	Geoffrey Boettcher	2008	
She	(New South Wales)	Olsen 40 mod	Peter Rodgers	Peter Rodgers	1982	
She's the Culprit	(Tasmania)	Inglis 39 Mod	Todd Leary	Todd Leary	1994	
Shogun	(Victoria (state))	Cookson 50	Rob Hanna	Rob Hanna	2005	
Skandia	(New South Wales)	30m Maxi	Grant Wharington	Grant Wharington	2003	
Somoya	(New South Wales)	Northshore 46	Garry Rose	Garry Rose	1999	
St Jude	(New South Wales)	Sydney 47	Noel Cornish	Noel Cornish	2007	
Strewth	(New South Wales)	MKL 49	Geoff Hill	Geoff Hill	2002	
The SubZero Goat	(New South Wales)	Sydney 38	Clayton; Bruce Foye; Lance Packman; Mitchell Gordon	Mitchell Gordon	2003	
Telecoinabox Merit	(Queensland)	Volvo Ocean 60	Leo Rodriguez	Leo Rodriguez	1997	
Terra Firma	(Victoria (state))	Sydney 47	Nicholas Bartels	Nicholas Bartels	2004	
Time Lord	(New Zealand)	Bavaria 50	Donald Keith Munro	Donald Keith Munro	2005	
Tow Truck	(New South Wales)	Ker 11.3	Anthony Paterson	Anthony Paterson	2001	
True North	(South Australia)	Beneteau First 40.7	Andrew Saies	Andrew Saies	2000	
Typhoon	(New South Wales)	Farr 395	Barry Kelly	Barry Kelly	2006	
Valheru	(Tasmania)	Elliott 13 mod	Anthony Lyall	Anthony Lyall	1994	
Walross 4	(Germany)	Nissen 56	Akademischer Segler-Verein e.V	Christian Masilge	2007	
Wedgetail	(New South Wales)	Welbourn 42	Bill Wild	Bill Wild	2005	
Wild Oats XI	(New South Wales)	Welbourn 42	Robert Oatley	Mark Richards	2005	
Wild Side	(Victoria (state))	Sydney 36 CR	Martin Vaughan	Martin Vaughan	2008	
Winsome	(Netherlands)	S&S 41	Harry J Heijst	B Mirck	1972	
Wot Now	(New South Wales)	TP 52	Graeme Wood	Graeme Wood	2008	
Wot Yot	(New South Wales)	TP 52	Graeme Wood	W Sykes	2001	
Yendys	(New South Wales)	Reichel Pugh 55	Geoff Ross	Geoff Ross	2006	
Young Ones	(Victoria (state))	Young 11 (mod)	Ian Miller	Ian Miller	1984	

== Results ==
=== Line Honours ===
Pos	Sail Number	Yacht	State/Country	Yacht Type	LOA (Metres)	Skipper	Elapsed time d:hh:mm:ss
1	10001	Wild Oats XI	New South Wales	Reichel Pugh 100	30.00	Mark Richards	1:20:34:14
2	M10	Skandia	(Victoria (state)) Victoria	Jones IRC Maxi 98	30.00	Grant Wharington	1:21:41:17
3	AUS03	Ichi Ban	New South Wales	Jones 70	21.50	Matt Allen	1:22:28:10
4	USA50062	ASM Shockwave 5	New South Wales	Reichel Pugh 80	24.40	Andrew Short	1:22:57:30
5	AUS98888	Limit	Western Australia	Reichel Pugh 62	19.50	Alan Brierty	1:23:05:58
6	52566	Black Jack	Queensland	Reichel Pugh 66	20.12	Peter Harburg; Mark Bradford	1:23:19:31
7	AUS60000	Loki	New South Wales	Reichel Pugh 63	19.20	Stephen Ainsworth	1:23:29:50
8	1836	Yendys	New South Wales	Reichel Pugh 55	16.80	Geoff Ross	2:00:57:05
9	52002	Quest	New South Wales	Farr TP 52	15.84	Bob Steel	2:01:00:37
10	6952	Wot Now	New South Wales	Judel Vroljik TP 52	15.85	Graeme Wood	2:01:10:26
11	SM5200	Cougar II	(Victoria (state)) Victoria	Farr TP 52	15.85	Alan Whiteley	2:01:12:29
12	AUS70	Ragamuffin	New South Wales	Farr TP 52	15.85	Syd Fischer	2:01:46:37
13	8899	Quantum Racing	New South Wales	Farr Cookson 50	15.20	Ray Roberts	2:02:30:26
14	YC3300	Secret Mens Business 3	South Australia	Reichel Pugh 51	14.53	Geoff Boettcher	2:07:10:28
15	NOR2	Getaway-Sailing.com	New South Wales	Davidson Volvo Ocean 60	19.44	Peter Goldsworthy; Sam Price	2:07:47:13
16	8679	Telcoinabox Merit	Queensland	Farr Volvo Ocean 60	19.44	Leo Rodriguez; Ian Bishop	2:07:58:58 ^{1}
17	6952	Wot Yot	New South Wales	Nelson Marek TP 52	15.85	Bill Sykes	2:08:57:31
18	USA7960	Ragtime	United States	Spencer 65	19.73	Chris Welsh	2:10:38:15 ^{2}
19	10000	ASM Brindabella	New South Wales	Jutson 79	24.08	Peter Baker	2:11:00:29
20	SM2008	Audi Centre Melbourne	(Victoria (state)) Victoria	Corby 49	15.00	Chris Dare	2:12:53:42
21	R33	Chutzpah	(Victoria (state)) Victoria	Reichel Pugh IRC 40	12.35	Bruce Taylor	2:15:22:20
22	HW42	Wedgetail	Queensland	Welbourn 42	12.80	Bill Wild	2:15:37:30
23	8880	Goldfinger	(Victoria (state)) Victoria	Farr 52	15.79	Peter Blake; Kate Mitchell	2:15:44:20
24	5474	Pirelli	New South Wales	Farr 65	19.72	Martin James; Les Goodridge	2:16:39:43
25	YC560	Pale Ale Rager	South Australia	Elliott 56	17.10	Gary Shanks	2:16:42:56
26	7878	Sailors With Disabilities	New South Wales	Lyons 54	16.20	David Pescud	2:22:11:48
27	CR1	Optimus Prime	Western Australia	Reichel Pugh Marten 49	15.05	Trevor Taylor	2:23:43:21
28	B45	Rush	(Victoria (state)) Victoria	Farr 45	13.81	Ian & John Paterson	3:00:28:32
29	55555	Krakatoa II	New South Wales	Finot Pogo 40	12.19	Rod Skellet	3:02:34:44
30	M6	Tow Truck	New South Wales	Ker 11.3	11.44	Anthony Paterson	3:03:52:33
31	SM47	Terra Firma	(Victoria (state)) Victoria	Murray Burns Dovell Sydney 47	14.27	Nicholas Bartels	3:05:48:02
32	8338	AFR Midnight Rambler	New South Wales	Farr 40	12.41	Ed Psaltis	3:06:30:38
33	1195	Valheru	Tasmania	Elliott 43	13.05	Anthony Lyall	3:06:39:36
34	7771	Balance	New South Wales	Murray Burns Dovell Sydney 47 CR	14.27	Paul Clitheroe	3:12:24:35
35	FRA35547	Lady Courrier	France	Briand Beneteau First 45	13.68	Gery Trentseaux	3:12:51:33
36	MH7	Pla Loma IV	New South Wales	Reichel Pugh DK43	13.02	Rob Reynolds	3:12:59:45
37	6188	Strewth	New South Wales	Lyons MKL 49	14.97	Geoff Hill	3:13:09:02
38	8447	Mr Beaks Ribs	New South Wales	Farr Beneteau First 44.7	13.68	David Beak	3:13:30:58
39	6686	St Jude	New South Wales	Murray Burns Dovell Sydney 47	14.20	Noel Cornish	3:14:16:26
40	BRU1	Mahligai	New South Wales	Murray Burns Dovell Sydney 46	14.30	Murray Owen; Jenny Kings	3:15:02:02
41	826	Dream Lover	Queensland	Murray Burns Dovell MBD 40	12.47	Rick Morgan	3:15:06:44
42	G5038	Morris Finance Cinquante	(Victoria (state)) Victoria	Murray Burns Dovell Sydney 38	11.78	Ian Murray	3:15:33:56
43	GER6000	Walross 4	Germany	Nissen 56	16.95	Christian Masilge	3:15:40:25
44	7027	The SubZero Goat	New South Wales	Murray Burns Dovell Sydney 38	11.78	Mitchell Gordon	3:16:01:28
45	MH60	Eleni	New South Wales	Murray Burns Dovell Sydney 38	11.78	Tony Levett	3:16:10:21
46	Q40	Broadsword	New South Wales	Joubert-Nivelt Archambault 40	11.99	Simon Wood	3:16:13:28
47	2170	Ray White Spirit of Koomooloo	Queensland	Sparkman & Stephens S&S 48	14.80	Mike Freebairn	3:16:13:40
48	6068	J Steel (Yeah Baby)	New South Wales	Murray Burns Dovell Sydney 38	11.78	Marc & Louis Ryckmans	3:16:17:53
49	2001	Quetzalcoatl	New South Wales	Jones 40	12.33	Antony Sweetapple	3:16:32:24
50	360	Patrice Six	New South Wales	Jeppesen X41	12.50	Tony Kirby	3:16:32:56
51	8395	Typhoon	New South Wales	Farr 395	12.01	Barry Kelly	3:16:33:40
52	370	She's The Culprit	Tasmania	Jones 39	11.96	Todd Leary	3:16:35:21
53	5790GBR	Jus' do it 3	(United Kingdom) Great Britain	Farr Beneteau 47.7	14.60	Ian Darby	3:16:38:04
54	2999	Obsession	New South Wales	Murray Burns Dovell Sydney 38	11.78	Andrew Lygo	3:16:45:28
55	FRA8995	41 SUD	New Caledonia	Nivelt Archambault 40	12.00	Jean-Luc Esplaas	3:16:46:58
56	YC5974	True North	South Australia	Farr Beneteau First 40.7	11.92	Andrew Saies	3:16:47:54
57	F550	Mustang Sally	New Zealand	Farr 46	14.10	Warren Batt	3:17:04:38
58	6197	Pisces	Tasmania	Murray Burns Dovell Sydney 36	10.97	David Taylor	3:17:09:44
59	SM5985	Dormit INSX	(Victoria (state)) Victoria	Jutson NSX 38	11.63	Robert Sill	3:17:13:24
60	K8913	Time Lord	New Zealand	J&J Design Bavaria 50	14.99	Donald Munro	3:17:15:03
61	SM360	Wild Side	(Victoria (state)) Victoria	Murray Burns Dovell Sydney 36 CR	10.97	Martin Vaughan	3:17:18:09
62	8300	Secret Mens Business 1	New South Wales	Murray 42	12.75	Ross Trembath; Rob Curtis	3:17:49:58
63	5612	Abracadabra	New South Wales	Tripp 47	14.33	James Murchison	3:17:56:39
64	6146	Kioni-Global Yacht Racing	New South Wales	Farr Beneteau First 47.7	14.80	Andy Middleton	3:18:06:43
65	6689	Copernicus	New South Wales	Radford 12	11.99	Greg Zyner	3:18:11:48
66	N40	Papillon	New South Wales	Joubert Nivelt Archambault 40	11.99	Phil Molony	3:18:16:12
67	H262	Helsal IV	Tasmania	Briand Dynamique 62	18.65	Sally Smith	3:18:21:37
68	7551	Flying Fish-Arctos	New South Wales	Radford McIntyre 55	16.36	James Dobie; Andy Fairclough	3:18:23:46
69	NED118	Winsome	Netherlands	Sparkman & Stephens S&S 41	12.74	Harry J Heijst	3:18:54:51
70	3663	Lloyds Brokers-Too Impetuous	Queensland	Holland 43	12.88	Rudy Weber	3:19:53:23
71	S390	Jazz Player	(Victoria (state)) Victoria	Bakewell-White 39	11.92	Andrew & Mark Lawrence	3:21:01:05
72	NED1261	Pinta-M	Netherlands	Sparkman & Stephens S&S 41	12.74	Atse Blei	3:22:27:51
73	B331	Audacious	(Victoria (state)) Victoria	Murray Burns Dovell Sydney 38	11.78	Greg Clinnick; Paul Holden	3:22:43:55
74	4057	Aurora	New South Wales	Farr 40 One Off	12.30	Jim Holley	3:23:46:00
75	N9	One For The Road	New South Wales	Jutson Northshore 37	12.13	Kym Butler	3:23:47:23
76	8350	CHorse	New South Wales	Davidson Cavalier 350 SL	10.60	John Smith	4:00:10:23
77	S3274	Salona	New South Wales	J&J Yachts Salona 44	11.29	Phillip King	4:00:14:45
78	MH106	Impeccable	New South Wales	Peterson 3/4 Tonner IOR	10.20	John Walker	4:00:45:58
79	SM8	Chance of Shenval	(Victoria (state)) Victoria	Farr 40 One Off	12.00	Robert Green	4:00:48:01
80	F108	Finistere	Western Australia	Davidson 50	15.40	Robert Thomas	4:00:59:38
81	SM377	Bacardi	(Victoria (state)) Victoria	Peterson 44	13.34	Martin Power	4:03:34:54
82	533	Pippin	Queensland	Farr 37	11.40	Roger Sayers	4:04:21:06
83	R4	Seahold Perie Banou II	Western Australia	Sparkman & Stephens S&S 39	11.77	Jon Sanders	4:04:48:14
84	7407	Chancellor	New South Wales	Farr Beneteau First 40.7	11.92	Ted Tooher	4:04:49:21
85	6654	Isabella	New South Wales	Judel Vrolijk Hanse 400E	12.10	John Nolan	4:05:28:16
86	RQ1920	Charlie's Dream	Queensland	Holland-Cole-Lowe Bluewater 450	13.70	Peter Lewis	4:05:28:58
87	4924	She	New South Wales	Mull Olsen 40	12.23	Peter Rodgers	4:05:46:56
88	C111	Inca	Australian Capital Territory	Lavranos Vickers 41 MkII	12.50	Noel Sneddon; Rob Saunders	4:09:32:15
89	A19	Maluka of Kermandie	Tasmania	Gale Ranger 30	9.01	Sean Langman	4:13:49:05
90	6155	Getaway-Sailing 2	New South Wales	Murray Burns Dovell Sydney 38	11.78	Jay Pettifer	4:15:05:00
91	5527	Polaris of Belmont	New South Wales	Cole 43	13.20	Chris Dawe	4:21:19:23
92	325	Nest Property	Tasmania	Cole Traditional 30	9.14	Murray Wilkes	5:03:42:52
DNF	SM1000	Georgia	(Victoria (state)) Victoria	Farr 53	16.04	Graeme Ainley; John Williams	Retired-Sunk
DNF	262	Helsal III	Tasmania	Adams 20	20.00	Tony & Rob Fisher	Retired-Rudder Damage
DNF	M762	Inner Circle	New South Wales	Farr 40 IOR	12.24	Ken Robinson; Darren Cooney	Retired-Generator Failed
DNF	6081	Leukaemia Foundation	New South Wales	Murray Burns Dovell Sydney 38	11.78	Richard Holstein; Stewart Kellie	Retired-Rudder Damage
DNF	SUI1	Pachamama:Swiss TOP to TOP Global Climate Expedition	Switzerland	Nivelt 50	15.28	Dario Schwoerer	Retired-Undisclosed Reasons
DNF	780	Sanyo Maris	New South Wales	Payne Tasman Seabird	11.15	Ian Kiernan	Retired-Broken Gooseneck
DNF	G421	Shogun	(Victoria (state)) Victoria	Rogers 46	14.10	Rob Hanna	Retired-Disqualified ^{3}
DNF	G5905	Somoya	(Victoria (state)) Victoria	Kauffman Northshore 46	14.00	Garry Rose	Retired-Broken Furler

Notes

^1 – Telcoinabox Merit were given a 1080 minutes redress to be subtracted off their elapsed time under RRS 1.1 by the International Jury due to an incident where they provided assistance in rescuing the crew of Georgia after their yacht was sunk on the first day of the race.
^2 – Ragtime were given a 115 minutes redress to be subtracted off their elapsed time under RRS 1.1 by the International Jury due to an incident where they provided assistance after Georgia sunk and the crew was rescued on the first day of the race.
^3 – Shogun were disqualified from the race and was scored as a DNF by the Race Committee due to breaching RRS Rules 11,12 & 13 in a collision with multiple yachts at the start of the race in Sydney Harbour.

=== Overall Handicap ===
Pos	Division	Sail Number	Yacht	State/Country	Yacht Type	LOA (Metres)	Skipper	Corrected time d:hh:mm:ss
1	1	52002	Quest	New South Wales	Farr TP 52	15.84	Bob Steel	2:17:43:22
2	1	SM5200	Cougar II	(Victoria (state)) Victoria	Farr TP 52	15.85	Alan Whiteley	2:18:11:05
3	1	6952	Wot Now	New South Wales	Judel Vroljik TP 52	15.85	Graeme Wood	2:18:46:41
4	1	AUS70	Ragamuffin	New South Wales	Farr TP 52	15.85	Syd Fischer	2:18:54:01
5	1	1836	Yendys	New South Wales	Reichel Pugh 55	16.80	Geoff Ross	2:19:30:14
6	0	8899	Quantum Racing	New South Wales	Farr Cookson 50	15.20	Ray Roberts	2:20:26:14
7	1	AUS98888	Limit	Western Australia	Reichel Pugh 62	19.50	Alan Brierty	2:22:24:49
8	1	AUS60000	Loki	New South Wales	Reichel Pugh 63	19.20	Stephen Ainsworth	2:22:51:57
9	1	YC3300	Secret Mens Business 3	South Australia	Reichel Pugh 51	14.53	Geoff Boettcher	2:23:40:18
10	1	USA50062	ASM Shockwave 5	New South Wales	Reichel Pugh 80	24.40	Andrew Short	3:00:27:24
11	2	USA7960	Ragtime	United States	Spencer 65	19.73	Chris Welsh	3:02:42:16
12	0	AUS03	Ichi Ban	New South Wales	Jones 70	21.50	Matt Allen	3:03:30:46
13	0	52566	Black Jack	Queensland	Reichel Pugh 66	20.12	Peter Harburg; Mark Bradford	3:03:40:23
14	1	6952	Wot Yot	New South Wales	Nelson Marek TP 52	15.85	Bill Sykes	3:03:41:53
15	2	R33	Chutzpah	(Victoria (state)) Victoria	Reichel Pugh IRC 40	12.35	Bruce Taylor	3:04:18:01
16	2	HW42	Wedgetail	Queensland	Welbourn 42	12.80	Bill Wild	3:04:55:21
17	0	M10	Skandia	(Victoria (state)) Victoria	Jones IRC Maxi 98	30.00	Grant Wharington	3:07:40:48
18	1	SM2008	Audi Centre Melbourne	(Victoria (state)) Victoria	Corby 49	15.00	Chris Dare	3:07:50:00
19	2	YC560	Pale Ale Rager	South Australia	Elliott 56	17.10	Gary Shanks	3:08:10:57
20	1	8880	Goldfinger	(Victoria (state)) Victoria	Farr 52	15.79	Peter Blake; Kate Mitchell	3:10:21:02
21	0	10001	Wild Oats XI	New South Wales	Reichel Pugh 100	30.00	Mark Richards	3:13:55:55
22	3	M6	Tow Truck	New South Wales	Ker 11.3	11.44	Anthony Paterson	3:15:06:20
23	2	B45	Rush	(Victoria (state)) Victoria	Farr 45	13.81	Ian & John Paterson	3:17:04:21
24	2	CR1	Optimus Prime	Western Australia	Reichel Pugh Marten 49	15.05	Trevor Taylor	3:18:00:42
25	4	NED118	Winsome	Netherlands	Sparkman & Stephens S&S 41	12.74	Harry J Heijst	3:18:05:45
26	4	2170	Ray White Spirit of Koomooloo	Queensland	Sparkman & Stephens S&S 48	14.80	Mike Freebairn	3:18:36:36
27	3	8338	AFR Midnight Rambler	New South Wales	Farr 40	12.41	Ed Psaltis	3:19:23:11
28	4	NED1261	Pinta-M	Netherlands	Sparkman & Stephens S&S 41	12.74	Atse Blei	3:19:43:29
29	2	SM47	Terra Firma	(Victoria (state)) Victoria	Murray Burns Dovell Sydney 47	14.27	Nicholas Bartels	3:20:25:37
30	4	MH106	Impeccable	New South Wales	Peterson 3/4 Tonner IOR	10.20	John Walker	3:20:53:44
31	4	SM5985	Dormit INSX	(Victoria (state)) Victoria	Jutson NSX 38	11.63	Robert Sill	3:21:35:43
32	4	SM360	Wild Side	(Victoria (state)) Victoria	Murray Burns Dovell Sydney 36 CR	10.97	Martin Vaughan	3:21:40:42
33	4	6197	Pisces	Tasmania	Murray Burns Dovell Sydney 36	10.97	David Taylor	3:22:09:19
34	3	YC5974	True North	South Australia	Farr Beneteau First 40.7	11.92	Andrew Saies	3:22:23:33
35	2	1195	Valheru	Tasmania	Elliott 43	13.05	Anthony Lyall	3:22:56:33
36	3	8447	Mr Beaks Ribs	New South Wales	Farr Beneteau First 44.7	13.68	David Beak	3:23:00:30
37	3	FRA35547	Lady Courrier	France	Briand Beneteau First 45	13.68	Gery Trentseaux	3:23:22:54
38	4	R4	Seahold Perie Banou II	Western Australia	Sparkman & Stephens S&S 39	11.77	Jon Sanders	4:00:03:58
39	3	G5038	Morris Finance Cinquante	(Victoria (state)) Victoria	Murray Burns Dovell Sydney 38	11.78	Ian Murray	4:00:24:35
40	3	FRA8995	41 SUD	New Caledonia	Nivelt Archambault 40	12.00	Jean-Luc Esplaas	4:00:46:24
41	3	7027	The SubZero Goat	New South Wales	Murray Burns Dovell Sydney 38	11.78	Mitchell Gordon	4:00:54:54
42	3	Q40	Broadsword	New South Wales	Joubert-Nivelt Archambault 40	11.99	Simon Wood	4:01:23:59
43	3	2999	Obsession	New South Wales	Murray Burns Dovell Sydney 38	11.78	Andrew Lygo	4:01:32:41
44	3	6689	Copernicus	New South Wales	Radford 12	11.99	Greg Zyner	4:01:46:23
45	3	MH60	Eleni	New South Wales	Murray Burns Dovell Sydney 38	11.78	Tony Levett	4:01:47:00
46	3	6068	J Steel (Yeah Baby)	New South Wales	Murray Burns Dovell Sydney 38	11.78	Marc & Louis Ryckmans	4:01:55:21
47	3	F550	Mustang Sally	New Zealand	Farr 46	14.10	Warren Batt	4:01:59:06
48	3	370	She's The Culprit	Tasmania	Jones 39	11.96	Todd Leary	4:02:04:06
49	4	A19	Maluka of Kermandie	Tasmania	Gale Ranger 30	9.01	Sean Langman	4:02:37:00
50	3	5790GBR	Jus' do it 3	(United Kingdom) Great Britain	Farr Beneteau 47.7	14.60	Ian Darby	4:02:39:00
51	3	8395	Typhoon	New South Wales	Farr 395	12.01	Barry Kelly	4:02:44:44
52	3	N40	Papillon	New South Wales	Joubert Nivelt Archambault 40	11.99	Phil Molony	4:02:50:44
53	2	7771	Balance	New South Wales	Murray Burns Dovell Sydney 47 CR	14.27	Paul Clitheroe	4:03:05:49
54	3	6188	Strewth	New South Wales	Lyons MKL 49	14.97	Geoff Hill	4:03:12:01
55	3	360	Patrice Six	New South Wales	Jeppesen X41	12.50	Tony Kirby	4:03:37:03
56	4	N9	One For The Road	New South Wales	Jutson Northshore 37	12.13	Kym Butler	4:03:48:46
57	2	MH7	Pla Loma IV	New South Wales	Reichel Pugh DK43	13.02	Rob Reynolds	4:04:17:42
58	4	4057	Aurora	New South Wales	Farr 40 One Off	12.30	Jim Holley	4:04:27:33
59	3	6146	Kioni-Global Yacht Racing	New South Wales	Farr Beneteau First 47.7	14.80	Andy Middleton	4:05:06:20
60	2	6686	St Jude	New South Wales	Murray Burns Dovell Sydney 47	14.20	Noel Cornish	4:05:58:33
61	2	BRU1	Mahligai	New South Wales	Murray Burns Dovell Sydney 46	14.30	Murray Owen; Jenny Kings	4:06:10:40
62	4	SM377	Bacardi	(Victoria (state)) Victoria	Peterson 44	13.34	Martin Power	4:07:33:54
63	3	8300	Secret Mens Business 1	New South Wales	Murray 42	12.75	Ross Trembath; Rob Curtis	4:08:44:42
64	3	B331	Audacious	(Victoria (state)) Victoria	Murray Burns Dovell Sydney 38	11.78	Greg Clinnick; Paul Holden	4:09:03:28
65	2	GER6000	Walross 4	Germany	Nissen 56	16.95	Christian Masilge	4:09:49:19
66	3	7407	Chancellor	New South Wales	Farr Beneteau First 40.7	11.92	Ted Tooher	4:11:04:25
67	3	S390	Jazz Player	(Victoria (state)) Victoria	Bakewell-White 39	11.92	Andrew & Mark Lawrence	4:11:42:54
68	4	325	Nest Property	Tasmania	Cole Traditional 30	9.14	Murray Wilkes	4:14:58:19
69	2	F108	Finistere	Western Australia	Davidson 50	15.40	Robert Thomas	4:23:12:20
DNF	1	SM1000	Georgia	(Victoria (state)) Victoria	Farr 53	16.04	Graeme Ainley; John Williams	Retired-Sunk
DNF	1	262	Helsal III	Tasmania	Adams 20	20.00	Tony & Rob Fisher	Retired-Rudder Damage
DNF	4	M762	Inner Circle	New South Wales	Farr 40 IOR	12.24	Ken Robinson; Darren Cooney	Retired-Generator Failed
DNF	3	6081	Leukaemia Foundation	New South Wales	Murray Burns Dovell Sydney 38	11.78	Richard Holstein; Stewart Kellie	Retired-Rudder Damage
DNF	4	780	Sanyo Maris	New South Wales	Payne Tasman Seabird	11.15	Ian Kiernan	Retired-Broken Gooseneck
DNF	1	G421	Shogun	(Victoria (state)) Victoria	Rogers 46	14.10	Rob Hanna	Retired-Disqualified ^{1}

Notes

^1 – Shogun were disqualified from the race and was scored as a DNF by the Race Committee due to breaching RRS Rules 11,12 & 13 in a collision with multiple yachts at the start of the race in Sydney Harbour.
