= Nicorette III =

- Designer(s): Simonis & Voogd, 2004; Brett Bakewell-White, 2016
- Builder: (New Zealand) Boatspeed, 2004 (New Zealand) Southern Ocean, 2016

Racing career
- Skippers: Ludde Ingvall

Nicorette III is a 90 ft maxi yacht. The yacht was designed by Alexander Simonis & Marten Voogd and built in New Zealand by Boatspeed Performance Sailcraft. She won line honours in the 2004 Sydney to Hobart Yacht Race skippered by Ludde Ingvall. In 2016 she was completely rebuilt at Southern Ocean Marine to a new design by naval architect Brett Bakewell-White which extended her hull to 98 ft. She was relaunched and rechristened maxi CQS in November 2016, in time to compete in the 2016 Sydney Hobart race.
