= EF Education (yacht) =

Yacht

- Nation: Sweden
- Class: Volvo Ocean 60
- Sail no: SWE–2
- Designer(s): Bruce Farr
- Builder: Richard Gilles and Tim Smythe

Racing career
- Skippers: Christine Guillou

EF Education is a yacht. She finished ninth in the 1997–98 Whitbread Round the World Race skippered by Christine Guillou.

== Career ==
EF Education was designed by Bruce Farr and built by Richard Gilles and Tim Smythe.

She finished ninth in the 1997–98 Whitbread Round the World Race skippered by Christine Guillou.
