= Sydney 38 =

Racing/cruising sailing yacht

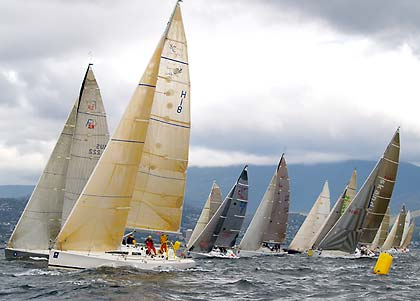
- Starting in a race in Hobart

Development
- Name: Sydney 38

Boat
- Draft: 2.65 m (8 ft 8 in)

Hull
- Type: Monohull
- Construction: GRP
- Hull weight: 1,930 kg (4,250 lb)
- LOA: 11.74 m (38.5 ft)
- LWL: 10.75 m (35.3 ft)
- Beam: 3.75 m (12.3 ft)

Hull appendages
- Keel: Fixed

Sails
- Mainsail area: 51.5 m^{2} (554 sq ft)
- Jib/genoa area: 39.2 m^{2} (422 sq ft)
- Spinnaker area: 129.8 m^{2} (1,397 sq ft)

The Sydney 38 is a racing/cruising sailing yacht. It is one of the largest fleets of one-design oceangoing yachts in Australia. The yacht is manufactured by Sydney Yachts.

== Specifications ==
- Fuel capacity: 100 L (22 imp gal; 26 US gal)
- Fresh water capacity: 100 L (22 imp gal; 26 US gal)
- Engine type: Yanmar 22.4 kW (30 shp)
- Empty: 5,560 kg (12,260 lb)
- Loaded: 6,920 kg (15,260 lb)

=== Rig dimensions ===
- I: 15.95 m (52.3 ft)
- J: 4.5 m (15 ft)
- P: 15.4 m (51 ft)
- E: 5.5 m (18 ft)
- STL: 4.5 m (15 ft)

=== Classification ===
CE Category: A - Ocean

IRC Rating (approx): 1.112
