= 2009 Sydney to Hobart Yacht Race =

2009 annual yacht race in Australia

64th Sydney to Hobart Yacht Race
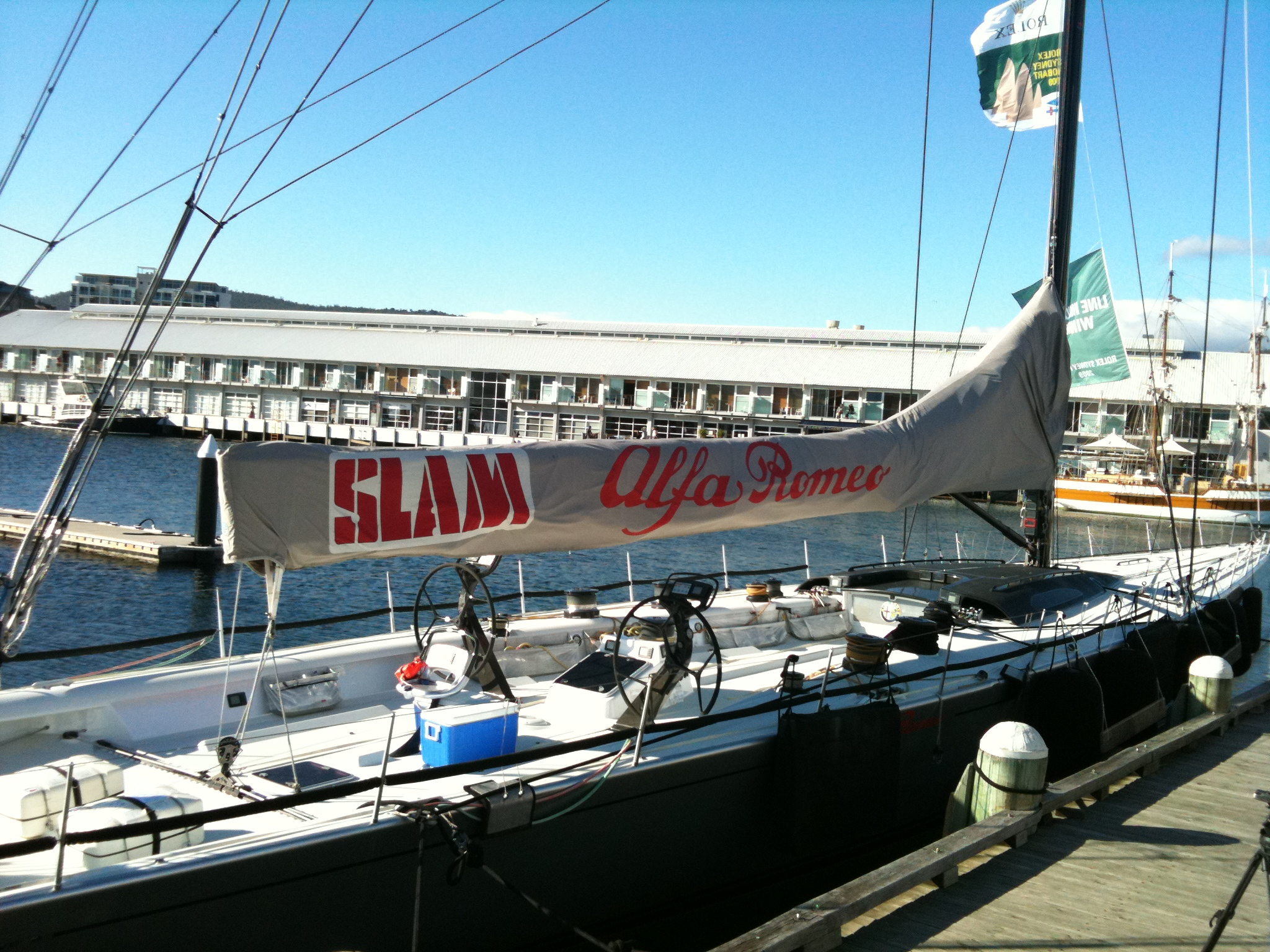
- Alfa Romeo II docked in Hobart on the morning after finishing the race

Event information
- Type: Yacht
- Dates: 26–31 December 2009
- Sponsor: Rolex
- Host city: Sydney, Hobart
- Boats: 100
- Distance: 628 nautical miles (1,163 km)
- Website: Website archive

Results
- Winner (2009): Alfa Romeo II (Neville Crichton)

Succession
- Previous: Wild Oats XI (Mark Richards) in 2008
- Next: Wild Oats XI (Mark Richards) in 2010

The 2009 Rolex Sydney to Hobart Yacht Race, hosted by the Cruising Yacht Club of Australia in Sydney, New South Wales, was the 65th annual running of the "blue water classic" Sydney to Hobart Yacht Race.

It began at Sydney Harbour at 1:00pm (AEDT) on Boxing Day, 26 December, before heading south for 630 nautical miles (1,170 km) through the Tasman Sea, past Bass Strait, into Storm Bay and up the River Derwent, to cross the finish line in Hobart, Tasmania. Seven Network and Yahoo!7 provided a live, 90-minute webcast of the start of the race.

Line honours in the 100 boat event were won by the New Zealand maxi Alfa Romeo II raced by Neville Crichton, recording her 146th consecutive ocean classic victory. Defending line honours champion Wild Oats XI was attempting to establish a new record of five successive wins, but was second to Alfa Romeo by 2 hours and 3 minutes. Two True (Andrew Saies) won the Tattersall's Cup.

== 2009 fleet ==
100 yachts started for the 2009 Sydney to Hobart Yacht race. Entries were:

Yacht	Nation	Type	Owner	Skipper	Launch year	Ref
41 SUD	(New Caledonia)	Archambault A40	Jean-Luc Esplaas	Jean-Luc Esplaas	2006	
Adventure of Hornet	(United Kingdom)	Challenge	Royal Navy Sailing Association	Richard Tarr	1991	
AFR Midnight Rambler	(New South Wales)	Farr 40	Ed Psaltis; Bob Thomas	Ed Psaltis	2001	
Alfa Romeo II	(New Zealand)	Reichel/Pugh Maxi	Neville Crichton	Neville Crichton	2005	
Another Fiasco	(Queensland)	Jutson 43	Damian Suckling	Damian Suckling	1994	
Archie	(Tasmania)	Archambault A35	Sally Rattle	Mick Souter	2006	
Auch	(Tasmania)	Beneteau First 44.7	David Bean; Jo Bean	David Bean	2006	
Audi Centre Melbourne	(Victoria (state))	Corby 49	Chris Dare	Chris Dare	2007	
Aurora	(New South Wales)	Farr 40 - one off	Mary Holley; Jim Holley	Jim Holley	1983	
B52	(New South Wales)	Sydney 41	Stephen Brown; Paul D'olier	Paul D'olier	1995	
Bacardi	(Victoria (state))	Peterson 44	Martin Power	Martin Power	1978	
Balance	(New South Wales)	Beneteau 45	Paul Clitheroe	Paul Clitheroe	2008	
Bear Necessity	(New South Wales)	C&C 115	Andrew Dally; Pauline Dally	Andrew Dally	2007	
Bet247	(New South Wales)	Sydney 38	Adrian Dunphy	Adrian Dunphy		
Birds Off Boats (modified Obsession)	(New South Wales)	Sydney 38 Mod	Obsession Syndicate	Andrew Lygo	2000	
Broomstick	(New South Wales)	Volvo Ocean 60	Michael Cranitch		1989	
Calm	(Victoria (state))	TP 52	Jason Van der Slot; John Williams; Graeme Ainley	Jason Van der Slot	2005	
Challenger of Hornet	(United Kingdom)	Challenge	UK Ministry of Defence	Darren Gale	1991	
Chancellor	(New South Wales)	Beneteau First 40.7	Ted Tooher	Ted Tooher	2001	
Charisma	(Spain)	S&S 57	Alejandro Pérez Calzada	Alejandro Pérez Calzada	1970	
Charlie's Dream	(Queensland)	Bluewater 450	Peter Lewis	B Pozzey	2008	
CHorse	(New South Wales)	Cavalier 350 SL	John Smith	John Smith		
Chutzpah	(Victoria (state))	Caprice 40	Bruce Taylor	Bruce Taylor	2007	
Colortile	(New South Wales)	Sayer 45	Warren Buchan; Kristy Edwards	B Ryan	2000	
Copernicus	(New South Wales)	Radford 12	Greg Zyner	Greg Zyner	1988	
Cougar II	(Victoria (state))	TP 52	Alan Whiteley	Alan Whiteley	2005	
Dekadence	(Tasmania)	DK 46	David Creese	David Creese	2004	
Discoverer of Hornet	(United Kingdom)	Challenge	UK Ministry of Defence	Rebecca Walford	1991	
Eleni	(New South Wales)	Sydney 38	Tony Levett	Tony Levett	2003	
Etihad Stadium	(Victoria (state))	IRC Maxi 98		Grant Wharington		
Evolution Racing	(New South Wales)	Cookson 50	Ray Roberts	Ray Roberts	2006	
EZ Street	(New South Wales)	Warwick 44	Bruce Dover		1990	
Flying Fish	(New South Wales)	Radford 16.4	Flying Fish Online	Andy Fairclough	2001	
Getaway-Sailing.com	(New South Wales)	Volvo Ocean 60	Peter Goldsworthy	Peter Goldsworthy	2001	
Getaway Sailing 2	(New South Wales)	Sydney 37	Peter Goldsworthy		2001	
Geomatic Joker	(Victoria (state))	Jarken 38	Grant Chapperfield	Grant Chapperfield		
Goldfinger	(Victoria (state))	Farr 52	Kate Mitchell; Peter Blake	Peter Blake	2002	
Helsal III	(Tasmania)	Adams/Barrett 20	Tony Fisher; Rob Fisher	Tony Fisher	1984	
Helsal IV	(Tasmania)	Dynamique 62	Tony Fisher		1986	
Holy Cow!	(New South Wales)	Beneteau Oceanis 50	John Clinton; Kim Clinton	John Clinton	2007	
ICAP Leopard	(United Kingdom)	Maxi	Mike Slade	Mike Slade	2007	
Ichi Ban	(New South Wales)	Jones 70	Matt Allen	Matt Allen	2005	
Imagination	(New South Wales)	Beneteau First 47.7	Robin Hawthorn	Robin Hawthorn	2002	
Investec LOYAL	(Tasmania)	Cookson modified	Sean Langman	Sean Langman	1989	
J Steel (Yeah Baby)	(New South Wales)	Sydney 38	Marc Ryckmans; Louis Ryckmans	Marc Ryckmans	2000	
Kioni	(New South Wales)	Beneteau First 47.7	Nick Athineos	Nick Athineos	2001	
Knee Deep	(Western Australia)	Farr 49	Phillip Childs; Frank Van Ruth	Phillip Childs	1999	
Krakatoa II	(New South Wales)	Pogo 40	Rod Skellet	Rod Skellet	2005	
Lahana	(New South Wales)	30m Maxi	Peter Millard; John Honan	Peter Millard	2003	
Limit	(Western Australia)	Reichel Pugh 62	Alan Brierty	Alan Brierty	2008	
Lion New Zealand	(New Zealand)	Whitbread Maxi	Lion Maritime Development	Alistair Moore	1984	
Livewire.org.au	(New South Wales)	Beneteau Oceanis 37		David Pring		
Living Doll	(Victoria (state))	Farr 55	Michael Hiatt	Michael Hiatt	2008	
Loki	(New South Wales)	Reichel Pugh 63	Stephen Ainsworth	Stephen Ainsworth	2008	
Love & War	(New South Wales)	S&S 47	Simon Kurts	Simon Kurts	1973	
Mahligai	(New Zealand)	Sydney 46	Murray Owens; Jenny Kings	Murray Owens	1998	
Matangi	(Tasmania)	Frers 39	David Stephenson	David Stephenson	1989	
Menace	(New South Wales)	Phillips/Simpson 11.7	Niven James	John Simpson	2009	
Merit	(Queensland)	Volvo Ocean 60	Leo Rodriguez	Leo Rodriguez	1997	
Mondo	(Queensland)	Sydney 38	Ray Sweeney	Ray Sweeney	2003	
More Witchcraft	(New South Wales)	Dibley 46	John Cameron		1995	
Namadgi	(Australian Capital Territory)	Bavaria 44	Syndicate of 26 owners	P Jones	2003	
Next	(New South Wales)	Sydney 38	J Krehbiel	Ian Mason	2000	
Ninety Seven	(Victoria (state))	Farr 47	Alan Saunders	Alan Saunders	1993	
Nips N Tux	(New South Wales)	IMX 40	Howard de Torres	Howard de Torres	2000	
One for the Road	(Australia) (NSW)	Northshore 37	Kym Butler	Kym Butler	2003	
Paca	(New South Wales)	Beneteau First 40	Philippe Mengual	Philippe Mengual	2003	
Panacea	Beneteau 40.7	Peta Wilcox	Peta Wilcox	2000		
Papillon	(New South Wales)	Archambault A40	Phil Molony	Phil Molony	2005	
Patrice Six	(New South Wales)	X-41	Tony Kirby	Tony Kirby	2007	
Pelagic Magic	(New South Wales)	Beneteau 40.7	Hugh Torode	Hugh Torode	2005	
Perie Banou II	(Western Australia)	S&S 39	Jon Sanders	Jon Sanders	1971	
Pinta - M	(Netherlands)	S&S 41	Atse Blei	Atse Blei	1972	
Pippin	(Queensland)	Farr 37	Roger Sayers	Roger Sayers	1984	
Polaris of Belmont	(New South Wales)	Cole 43	Chris Dawe	Chris Dawe	1970	
Pretty Fly III	(New South Wales)	Cookson 50	Colin Woods	Colin Woods	2005	
Quest	(New South Wales)	TP 52	Bob Steel	Bob Steel	2005	
Quetzalcoatl	(New South Wales)	Jones 40	Anthony Sweetapple		2001	
Ragamuffin	(New South Wales)	TP 52	Syd Fischer	Syd Fischer	2004	
Rán	(United Kingdom)	JV 72	Niklas Zennström; Tim Powell	Niklas Zennström	2009	
Rapture	(United States)	SW 100	Brook Lenfest	Jeff Hanlon	2007	
Ray White Castle Hill Tartan	(New South Wales)	Northshore 38	Ian Sanford; Barrie King	Bruce Moore	1984	
Ray White Spirit of Koomooloo	(Queensland)	S&S 49	Mike Freebairn; Don Freebairn	Mike Freebairn	1968	
Re-Ignition	(Queensland)	Sydney 42	Seddon Cripps	Seddon Cripps	1993	
Rush	(Victoria (state))	Corel 45	Ian Paterson; John Paterson	John Paterson	1996	
Sailing Services	(New South Wales)	Modified 66				
Sailors With disABILITIES	(New South Wales)	Lyons 54	David Pescud	David Pescud	2000	
Salona	(New South Wales)	Salona 37	Philip King	D Cooney	2006	
Sanyo Maris	(New South Wales)	Tasman Seabird	Tiare Tomaszewski; John Green; Ian Kiernan; Ben Hawke	Ian Kiernan	1958	
Seahold Perie Banou II	(Western Australia)	S&S 39		Jon Sanders		
Secret Mens Business 3.5	(South Australia)	Reichel Pugh 51	Geoff Boettcher	Geoff Boettcher	2008	
SES Inch by Winch	(New South Wales)	Peterson 44	Andrew Wenham		1980	
Shamrock	(Victoria (state))	Reichel Pugh 47	Tony Donnellan	Tony Donnellan	2004	
She	(New South Wales)	Olsen 40 mod	Peter Rodgers	Peter Rodgers	1982	
She's The Culprit	(Tasmania)	Jones 39	Todd Leary	Todd Leary	1994	
Shining Sea	(South Australia)	Sydney 38	Andrew Corletto	Andrew Corletto	2002	
Shogun	(Victoria (state))	TP 52	Rob Hanna	Rob Hanna	2005	
Shortwave	(New South Wales)	JV IRC52	Matthew Short; Christine Short	Matthew Short	2005	
Brindabella	(New South Wales)	Jutson 79	Sailing Services Australia		1993	
St Jude	(New South Wales)	Sydney 47	Noel Cornish	Noel Cornish	2007	
Strewth	(New South Wales)	MKL 49	Geoff Hill	Geoff Hill	2002	
The Subzero Goat	(New South Wales)	Sydney 38	Clayton; Bruce Foye; Lance Peckman; Gordon	Bruce Foye	2003	
Suesea	(Western Australia)	MKL 49	Brian Todd	Brian Todd	2008	
Swish	(New South Wales)	Sydney 38	Steven Proud	Steven Proud	2001	
Tokolosh	(New South Wales)	Ludde Ingvall	Ludde Ingvall	2004		
Tow Truck	(New South Wales)	Kerr 11.3	Anthony Paterson	Anthony Paterson	2001	
Two True	(South Australia)	Beneteau First 40	Andrew Saies	Andrew Saies	2009	
Valheru	(Tasmania)	Elliott 43	Anthony Lyall	Anthony Lyall	1994	
Wahoo	(New South Wales)	Frers 40	Graham Mulligan	Graham Mulligan	1985	
Wasabi	(New South Wales)	Sayer 12 MOD	Bruce McKay	Bruce McKay	2007	
Wicked	(Victoria (state))	Beneteau First 40	Mike Welsh	Mike Welsh	2009	
Wild Oats XI	(New South Wales)	RP 100 ft Maxi	Bob Oatley	Mark Richards	2005	
Wild Thing	(Victoria (state))	30m Maxi	Grant Wharington	Grant Wharington	2003	
Yendys	(New South Wales)	Reichel Pugh 55	Geoff Ross	Geoff Ross	2006	
Young Nicholson	(New Zealand)	Young 11	Kim McMorran	Kim McMorran	1991	
YuuZoo (previously known as Nicorette)	(New South Wales)	Maxi		Ludde Ingvall	2004	
Zephyr	(New South Wales)	Farr 1020	James Connell; Alex Brandon	James Connell	1984	
Zora I	(New South Wales)	Salona 45	Phillip King		2005	

== Results ==
=== Line Honours ===
Pos	Sail Number	Yacht	State/Country	Yacht Type	LOA (Metres)	Skipper	Elapsed time d:hh:mm:ss
1	NZL80	Alfa Romeo	New Zealand	Reichel Pugh Maxi	30.48	Neville Crichton	2:09:02:10
2	10001	Wild Oats XI	New South Wales	Reichel Pugh RP100	30.48	Mark Richards	2:11:05:34
3	GBR1R	ICAP Leopard	(United Kingdom) Great Britain	Farr Maxi	30.48	Mike Slade	2:16:45:46
4	NZL99999	Investec LOYAL	Tasmania	Elliott Maxi	30.48	Sean Langman	2:18:34:33
5	GBR7236R	Rán	(United Kingdom) Great Britain	Judel Vrolijk JV72	21.90	Niklas Zennström; Tim Powell	2:20:27:55
6	AUS03	Ichi Ban	New South Wales	Jones 70	21.50	Matt Allen	2:21:37:56
7	AUS11111	YuuZoo	New South Wales	Simonis Voogd Maxi	27.38	Ludde Ingvall	3:00:05:05
8	10081	Lahana	New South Wales	Bakewell-White 30m Maxi	30.00	Peter Millard; John Honan	3:03:13:07
9	AUS60000	Loki	New South Wales	Reichel Pugh 63	19.20	Stephen Ainsworth	3:06:41:37
10	6952	Shogun	(Victoria (state)) Victoria	Judel Vrolijk TP 52	15.85	Rob Hanna	3:08:16:03
11	1836	Yendys	New South Wales	Reichel Pugh 55	16.80	Geoff Ross	3:08:47:20
12	8899	Evolution Racing	New South Wales	Farr Cookson 50	15.20	Ray Roberts	3:09:27:49
13	R55	Living Doll	(Victoria (state)) Victoria	Farr 55	16.76	Michael Hiatt	3:10:28:44
14	52052	Shortwave	New South Wales	Judel Vrolijk TP 52	15.85	Matthew Short	3:10:36:59
15	AUS70	Ragamuffin	New South Wales	Farr TP 52	15.85	Syd Fischer	3:10:56:49
16	52002	Quest	New South Wales	Farr TP 52	15.84	Bob Steel	3:11:45:55
17	MAR1005	Rapture	United States	Farr SW100	30.20	Brook Lenfest; Jeff Hanlon	3:11:48:11
18	SM5200	Cougar II	(Victoria (state)) Victoria	Farr TP 52	15.85	Alan Whiteley	3:12:43:05
19	8679	Merit	Queensland	Farr Volvo Ocean 60	19.44	Leo Rodriguez; Ian Bishop	3:13:00:32
20	YC3300	Secret Mens Business 3.5	South Australia	Reichel Pugh 51	15.64	Geoff Boettcher	3:13:36:33
21	SM5252	Calm	(Victoria (state)) Victoria	Farr TP 52	15.85	Jason Van der Slot; John Williams; Graeme Ainley	3:14:45:12
22	8848	Sailing Services BET247	New South Wales	Fa-Steinman Modified 66	20.15	Richard Christian	3:17:13:56
23	SM2008	Audi Centre Melbourne	(Victoria (state)) Victoria	Corby 49	15.00	Chris Dare	3:17:15:03
24	10007	Pretty Fly III	New South Wales	Farr Cookson 50	15.24	Colin Woods	3:17:41:10
25	B45	Rush	(Victoria (state)) Victoria	Farr 45	13.81	Ian & John Paterson	3:18:03:53
26	8880	Goldfinger	(Victoria (state)) Victoria	Farr 52	15.79	Peter Blake; Kate Mitchell	3:18:22:12
27	R33	Chutzpah	(Victoria (state)) Victoria	Reichel Pugh Caprice 40	12.35	Bruce Taylor	3:19:31:43
28	262	Helsal III	Tasmania	Adams 20	20.00	Tony & Rob Fisher	3:20:28:16
29	7878	Sailors With Disabilities	New South Wales	Lyons 54	16.20	David Pescud	3:20:31:17
30	M330	Shamrock	(Victoria (state)) Victoria	Reichel Pugh 47	14.21	Tony Donnellan	3:20:36:56
31	8338	AFR Midnight Rambler	New South Wales	Farr 40	12.41	Ed Psaltis; Bob Thomas	3:20:42:02
32	HY1407	Knee Deep	Western Australia	Farr 49	15.28	Philip Childs; Frank Van Ruth	3:21:04:57
33	SM46	Dekadence	Tasmania	Mills DK46	14.10	David Creese	3:21:07:03
34	M6	Tow Truck	New South Wales	Ker 11.3	11.44	Anthony Paterson	3:21:16:47
35	6686	St Jude	New South Wales	Murray Burns Dovell Sydney 47	14.20	Noel Cornish	3:21:22:23
36	360	Patrice Six	New South Wales	Jeppesen X41	12.35	Tony Kirby	3:23:05:34
37	F310	Suesea	Western Australia	Azzurra Marten 49	14.90	Brian Todd	3:23:26:44
38	35	Imagination	New South Wales	Farr Beneteau First 47.7	14.50	Robin & Annette Hawthorn	3:23:30:43
39	ESP7100	Charisma	Spain	Sparkman & Stephens S&S 57	17.02	Alejandro Perez Calzada	3:23:38:48
40	NZL3900	Lion New Zealand	New Zealand	Holland 78 Whitbread Maxi	23.77	Alistair Moore	3:23:40:04
41	YC400	Two True	South Australia	Farr Beneteau First 40	12.24	Andrew Saies	3:23:49:03
42	67	Colortile	New South Wales	Sayer 44.9	13.70	Warren Buchan; Kristy Edwards	4:00:01:10
43	AUS88	Wasabi	New South Wales	Sayer 12 MOD	11.99	Bruce McKay	4:00:09:26
44	SM4	Wicked	(Victoria (state)) Victoria	Farr Beneteau First 40	12.24	Mark Welsh	4:00:11:16
45	6797	Holy Cow!	New South Wales	Berret-Racoupeau Oceanis 50	15.20	John Clinton	4:00:16:35
46	6073	Swish	New South Wales	Murray Burns Dovell Sydney 38	11.78	Steven Proud	4:00:16:54
47	6081	Next	New South Wales	Murray Burns Dovell Sydney 38	11.78	Jay Krehbiel; Ian Mason	4:00:16:59
48	1195	Valheru	Tasmania	Elliott 43	13.05	Anthony Lyall	4:04:43:26
49	B9797	Ninety Seven	(Victoria (state)) Victoria	Farr 47	14.32	Alan Saunders	4:05:07:02
50	6188	Strewth	New South Wales	Lyons MKL 49	14.97	Geoff Hill	4:05:19:58
51	NZL1	Mahligai	New South Wales	Murray Burns Dovell Sydney 46	14.30	Murray Owen; Jenny Kings	4:05:20:53
52	7027	The Subzero Goat	New South Wales	Murray Burns Dovell Sydney 38	11.78	Bruce Foye	4:06:37:59
53	A44	Auch	Tasmania	Farr Beneteau First 44.7	13.35	David Bean	4:07:38:50
54	Q999	Another Fiasco	Queensland	Jutson 43	12.88	Damian Suckling	4:08:01:55
55	55555	Krakatoa II	New South Wales	Finot Pogo 40	12.19	Rod Skellet	4:08:29:40
56	5995	Nips N Tux	New South Wales	Jeppesen IMX 40	12.10	Howard De Torres	4:08:34:34
57	6812	Paca	New South Wales	Farr Beneteau First 40	12.24	Philippe Mengual	4:08:42:45
58	GBR7804T	Discoverer of Hornet	(United Kingdom) Great Britain	Devonport Challenge 72	21.90	Rebecca Walford	4:08:43:44
59	7771	Balance	New South Wales	Briand Beneteau 45	13.68	Paul Clitheroe	4:12:21:35
60	7551	Flying Fish-Arctos	New South Wales	Radford McIntyre 55	16.36	Andy Fairclough	4:12:21:43
61	N40	Papillon	New South Wales	Joubert Nivelt Archambault 40	11.99	Phil Molony	4:12:51:23
62	2170	Ray White Spirit of Koomooloo	Queensland	Sparkman & Stephens S&S 48	14.80	Mike Freebairn	4:12:53:10
63	8975	Zora I	New South Wales	J&J Yachts Salona 45	13.55	Phil King	4:12:54:50
64	M24	Menace	New South Wales	Phillips-Simpson 11.7	11.68	Niven James; John Simpson	4:12:58:02
65	GBR7802T	Adventure of Hornet	(United Kingdom) Great Britain	Devonport Challenge 72	21.90	Richard Tarr	4:13:00:25
66	8402	More Witchraft	New South Wales	Dibley 46	13.95	John Cameron	4:13:07:14
67	SM377	Bacardi	(Victoria (state)) Victoria	Peterson 44	13.34	Martin Power	4:13:24:00
68	A35	Archie	Tasmania	Joubert-Nivelt Archambault 35	10.59	Sally Rattle; Mick Souter	4:13:46:11
69	11407	Pelagic Magic	New South Wales	Farr Beneteau 40.7	11.92	Hugh Torode	4:13:58:26
70	6689	Copernicus	New South Wales	Radford 12	11.99	Greg Zyner	4:13:58:28
71	294	Love & War	New South Wales	Sparkman & Stephens S&S 47	14.21	Simon Kurts	4:14:03:23
72	5350	Matangi	Tasmania	Frers 39	11.78	David Stephenson	4:14:04:49
73	7407	Chancellor	New South Wales	Farr Beneteau First 40.7	11.92	Ted Tooher	4:14:10:58
74	6338	Shining Sea	South Australia	Murray Burns Dovell Sydney 38	11.78	Andrew Corletto	4:14:13:38
75	MH115	Bear Necessity	New South Wales	Jackett C&C 115	11.50	Andrew & Pauline Dally	4:14:37:51
76	FRA8995	41 SUD	New Caledonia	Nivelt Archambault 40	12.00	Jean-Luc Esplaas	4:14:53:33
77	S3274	Salona	New South Wales	J&J Yachts Salona 44	11.29	Phillip King; Darren Cooney	4:15:09:10
78	MH60	Eleni	New South Wales	Murray Burns Dovell Sydney 38	11.78	Tony Levett	4:15:23:21
79	GBR7803T	Challenger of Hornet	(United Kingdom) Great Britain	Devonport Challenge 72	21.90	Darren Gale	4:15:32:55
80	8289	Zephyr Hamilton Elevators	New South Wales	Farr 1020	10.20	James Connell; Alex Brandon	4:15:33:35
81	2001	Quetzalcoatl	New South Wales	Jones 40	12.33	Antony Sweetapple	4:15:41:00
82	6814	EZ Street	New South Wales	Warwick 44	13.52	Bruce Dover; Trevor Cosh	4:15:42:46
83	M9000	Geomatic Joker	(Victoria (state)) Victoria	Lyons Jarken 38	11.96	Grant Chipperfield	4:15:49:23
84	N9	One For The Road	New South Wales	Jutson Northshore 37	12.13	Kym Butler	4:18:28:00
85	393	SES Inch by Winch	New South Wales	Peterson 44	13.86	Andrew Wenham; David Burt	4:18:52:36
86	NED1261	Pinta-M	Netherlands	Sparkman & Stephens S&S 41	12.74	Atse Blei	4:19:40:32
87	4924	She	New South Wales	Mull Olsen 40	12.23	Peter Rodgers	4:19:57:42
88	3846	Ray White Castle Hill Tartan	New South Wales	Kaufman Northshore 38	11.62	Ian Sanford; Barrie King	4:20:05:57
89	R4	Seahold Perie Banou II	Western Australia	Sparkman & Stephens S&S 39	11.77	Jon Sanders	4:20:38:03
90	6388	Namadgi	Australian Capital Territory	Humphreys Elan 444	13.90	Paul Jones	4:21:33:47
91	RQ1920	Charlie's Dream	Queensland	Holland-Cole-Lowe Bluewater 450	13.70	Peter Lewis	4:21:50:48
92	6773	Livewire.org.au	New South Wales	Finot Oceanis 37	12.47	David Pring	4:22:39:56
93	5527	Polaris of Belmont	New South Wales	Cole 43	13.20	Chris Dawe	5:07:38:15
94	4057	Aurora	New South Wales	Farr 40 One Off	12.30	Jim Holley	4:19:08:41 ^{1}
DNF	M10	Etihad Stadium	(Victoria (state)) Victoria	Jones IRC Maxi 98	30.00	Grant Wharington	Retired-Rigging Issues
DNF	6146	Kioni	New South Wales	Farr Beneteau First 47.7	14.80	Nick Athineos	Retired-Disqualified ^{2}
DNF	AUS98888	Limit	Western Australia	Reichel Pugh 62	19.50	Alan Brierty	Retired-Rigging Issues
DNF	6305	Mondo	Queensland	Murray Burns Dovell Sydney 38	11.78	Ray Sweeney	Retired-Damaged Rigging
DNF	533	Pippin	Queensland	Farr 37	11.40	Roger Sayers	Retired-Mechanical Failure
DNF	370	She's The Culprit	Tasmania	Jones 39	11.96	Todd Leary	Retired-Minor Damage

Notes

^1 – Aurora were penalised 30% of their placing by the International Jury due to breaching RRS Rules 41 & 42.1 for receiving outside assistance after encountering engine problems during the race.
^2 – Kioni were disqualified from the race and was scored as a DNF by the Race Committee due to breaching RRS Rules 11,14 & 19 in a collision with multiple yachts at the start of the race in Sydney Harbour.

=== Overall Handicap ===
Pos	Division	Sail Number	Yacht	State/Country	Yacht Type	LOA (Metres)	Skipper	Corrected time d:hh:mm:ss
1	4	YC400	Two True	South Australia	Farr Beneteau First 40	12.24	Andrew Saies	4:07:57:43
2	4	SM4	Wicked	(Victoria (state)) Victoria	Farr Beneteau First 40	12.24	Mark Welsh	4:08:39:08
3	3	6081	Next	New South Wales	Murray Burns Dovell Sydney 38	11.78	Jay Krehbiel; Ian Mason	4:09:48:54
4	3	6073	Swish	New South Wales	Murray Burns Dovell Sydney 38	11.78	Steven Proud	4:10:17:42
5	3	360	Patrice Six	New South Wales	Jeppesen X41	12.35	Tony Kirby	4:10:24:32
6	1	GBR7236R	Rán	(United Kingdom) Great Britain	Judel Vrolijk JV72	21.90	Niklas Zennström; Tim Powell	4:10:48:21
7	4	8289	Zephyr Hamilton Elevators	New South Wales	Farr 1020	10.20	James Connell; Alex Brandon	4:10:52:27
8	3	ESP7100	Charisma	Spain	Sparkman & Stephens S&S 57	17.02	Alejandro Perez Calzada	4:10:55:59
9	3	35	Imagination	New South Wales	Farr Beneteau First 47.7	14.50	Robin & Annette Hawthorn	4:11:15:36
10	2	M6	Tow Truck	New South Wales	Ker 11.3	11.44	Anthony Paterson	4:11:16:18
11	2	8338	AFR Midnight Rambler	New South Wales	Farr 40	12.41	Ed Psaltis; Bob Thomas	4:11:26:24
12	0	NZL80	Alfa Romeo	New Zealand	Reichel Pugh Maxi	30.48	Neville Crichton	4:12:11:51
13	1	6952	Shogun	(Victoria (state)) Victoria	Judel Vrolijk TP 52	15.85	Rob Hanna	4:13:09:50
14	4	R4	Seahold Perie Banou II	Western Australia	Sparkman & Stephens S&S 39	11.77	Jon Sanders	4:13:59:10
15	2	R33	Chutzpah	(Victoria (state)) Victoria	Reichel Pugh Caprice 40	12.35	Bruce Taylor	4:14:06:32
16	2	6686	St Jude	New South Wales	Murray Burns Dovell Sydney 47	14.20	Noel Cornish	4:14:10:49
17	0	8899	Evolution Racing	New South Wales	Farr Cookson 50	15.20	Ray Roberts	4:14:32:46
18	2	B45	Rush	(Victoria (state)) Victoria	Farr 45	13.81	Ian & John Paterson	4:14:41:22
19	4	5350	Matangi	Tasmania	Frers 39	11.78	David Stephenson	4:15:17:28
20	1	AUS70	Ragamuffin	New South Wales	Farr TP 52	15.85	Syd Fischer	4:15:18:53
21	2	SM46	Dekadence	Tasmania	Mills DK46	14.10	David Creese	4:15:22:07
22	1	52052	Shortwave	New South Wales	Judel Vrolijk TP 52	15.85	Matthew Short	4:15:26:58
23	4	2170	Ray White Spirit of Koomooloo	Queensland	Sparkman & Stephens S&S 48	14.80	Mike Freebairn	4:15:43:02
24	4	294	Love & War	New South Wales	Sparkman & Stephens S&S 47	14.21	Simon Kurts	4:16:15:27
25	4	NED1261	Pinta-M	Netherlands	Sparkman & Stephens S&S 41	12.74	Atse Blei	4:16:26:12
26	0	AUS03	Ichi Ban	New South Wales	Jones 70	21.50	Matt Allen	4:16:27:22
27	1	52002	Quest	New South Wales	Farr TP 52	15.84	Bob Steel	4:16:29:48
28	1	1836	Yendys	New South Wales	Reichel Pugh 55	16.80	Geoff Ross	4:17:06:16
29	4	6812	Paca	New South Wales	Farr Beneteau First 40	12.24	Philippe Mengual	4:17:30:30
30	3	7027	The Subzero Goat	New South Wales	Murray Burns Dovell Sydney 38	11.78	Bruce Foye	4:17:36:53
31	4	A35	Archie	Tasmania	Joubert-Nivelt Archambault 35	10.59	Sally Rattle; Mick Souter	4:17:43:17
32	4	SM377	Bacardi	(Victoria (state)) Victoria	Peterson 44	13.34	Martin Power	4:18:06:15
33	1	SM5200	Cougar II	(Victoria (state)) Victoria	Farr TP 52	15.85	Alan Whiteley	4:18:06:55
34	3	5995	Nips N Tux	New South Wales	Jeppesen IMX 40	12.10	Howard De Torres	4:18:11:50
35	0	10001	Wild Oats XI	New South Wales	Reichel Pugh RP100	30.48	Mark Richards	4:18:13:35
36	1	YC3300	Secret Mens Business 3.5	South Australia	Reichel Pugh 51	15.64	Geoff Boettcher	4:18:27:34
37	1	R55	Living Doll	(Victoria (state)) Victoria	Farr 55	16.76	Michael Hiatt	4:19:08:26
38	3	A44	Auch	Tasmania	Farr Beneteau First 44.7	13.35	David Bean	4:19:27:47
39	4	3846	Ray White Castle Hill Tartan	New South Wales	Kaufman Northshore 38	11.62	Ian Sanford; Barrie King	4:20:33:49
40	2	8880	Goldfinger	(Victoria (state)) Victoria	Farr 52	15.79	Peter Blake; Kate Mitchell	4:20:40:04
41	4	MH115	Bear Necessity	New South Wales	Jackett C&C 115	11.50	Andrew & Pauline Dally	4:20:49:34
42	4	7407	Chancellor	New South Wales	Farr Beneteau First 40.7	11.92	Ted Tooher	4:20:54:14
43	2	HY1407	Knee Deep	Western Australia	Farr 49	15.28	Philip Childs; Frank Van Ruth	4:21:11:27
44	4	11407	Pelagic Magic	New South Wales	Farr Beneteau 40.7	11.92	Hugh Torode	4:21:13:56
45	2	SM2008	Audi Centre Melbourne	(Victoria (state)) Victoria	Corby 49	15.00	Chris Dare	4:21:16:32
46	1	SM5252	Calm	(Victoria (state)) Victoria	Farr TP 52	15.85	Jason Van der Slot; John Williams; Graeme Ainley	4:21:22:38
47	1	AUS60000	Loki	New South Wales	Reichel Pugh 63	19.20	Stephen Ainsworth	4:21:43:32
48	2	6188	Strewth	New South Wales	Lyons MKL 49	14.97	Geoff Hill	4:21:51:00
49	4	6689	Copernicus	New South Wales	Radford 12	11.99	Greg Zyner	4:21:53:33
50	3	GBR7804T	Discoverer of Hornet	(United Kingdom) Great Britain	Devonport Challenge 72	21.90	Rebecca Walford	4:22:14:20
51	2	M330	Shamrock	(Victoria (state)) Victoria	Reichel Pugh 47	14.21	Tony Donnellan	4:22:27:19
52	4	N9	One For The Road	New South Wales	Jutson Northshore 37	12.13	Kym Butler	4:22:28:23
53	2	67	Colortile	New South Wales	Sayer 44.9	13.70	Warren Buchan; Kristy Edwards	4:22:40:48
54	4	N40	Papillon	New South Wales	Joubert Nivelt Archambault 40	11.99	Phil Molony	4:22:58:48
55	2	F310	Suesea	Western Australia	Azzurra Marten 49	14.90	Brian Todd	4:23:12:41
56	2	B9797	Ninety Seven	(Victoria (state)) Victoria	Farr 47	14.32	Alan Saunders	4:23:25:10
57	2	Q999	Another Fiasco	Queensland	Jutson 43	12.88	Damian Suckling	4:23:44:27
58	4	FRA8995	41 SUD	New Caledonia	Nivelt Archambault 40	12.00	Jean-Luc Esplaas	5:00:39:04
59	0	GBR1R	ICAP Leopard	(United Kingdom) Great Britain	Farr Maxi	30.48	Mike Slade	5:01:33:35
60	2	1195	Valheru	Tasmania	Elliott 43	13.05	Anthony Lyall	5:01:34:25
61	3	M24	Menace	New South Wales	Phillips-Simpson 11.7	11.68	Niven James; John Simpson	5:01:56:04
62	3	7771	Balance	New South Wales	Briand Beneteau 45	13.68	Paul Clitheroe	5:02:00:47
63	3	M9000	Geomatic Joker	(Victoria (state)) Victoria	Lyons Jarken 38	11.96	Grant Chipperfield	5:02:06:39
64	0	10007	Pretty Fly III	New South Wales	Farr Cookson 50	15.24	Colin Woods	5:02:19:55
65	3	6338	Shining Sea	South Australia	Murray Burns Dovell Sydney 38	11.78	Andrew Corletto	5:02:21:08
66	3	GBR7802T	Adventure of Hornet	(United Kingdom) Great Britain	Devonport Challenge 72	21.90	Richard Tarr	5:03:04:08
67	3	MH60	Eleni	New South Wales	Murray Burns Dovell Sydney 38	11.78	Tony Levett	5:03:18:28
68	1	MAR1005	Rapture	United States	Farr SW100	30.20	Brook Lenfest; Jeff Hanlon	5:03:41:36
69	0	NZL99999	Investec LOYAL	Tasmania	Elliott Maxi	30.48	Sean Langman	5:04:05:50
70	0	10081	Lahana	New South Wales	Bakewell-White 30m Maxi	30.00	Peter Millard; John Honan	5:04:51:46
71	0	AUS11111	YuuZoo	New South Wales	Simonis Voogd Maxi	27.38	Ludde Ingvall	5:05:17:00
72	3	GBR7803T	Challenger of Hornet	(United Kingdom) Great Britain	Devonport Challenge 72	21.90	Darren Gale	5:05:56:18
73	4	4057	Aurora	New South Wales	Farr 40 One Off	12.30	Jim Holley	5:00:40:18 ^{1}
DNF	0	M10	Etihad Stadium	(Victoria (state)) Victoria	Jones IRC Maxi 98	30.00	Grant Wharington	Retired-Rigging Issues
DNF	1	AUS98888	Limit	Western Australia	Reichel Pugh 62	19.50	Alan Brierty	Retired-Rigging Issues
DNF	3	6305	Mondo	Queensland	Murray Burns Dovell Sydney 38	11.78	Ray Sweeney	Retired-Damaged Rigging
DNF	3	370	She's The Culprit	Tasmania	Jones 39	11.96	Todd Leary	Retired-Minor Damage

Notes

^1 – Aurora were penalised 30% of their placing by the International Jury due to breaching RRS Rules 41 & 42.1 for receiving outside assistance after encountering engine problems during the race.
