= 2011 Sydney to Hobart Yacht Race =

2011 annual yacht race in Australia

66th Sydney to Hobart Yacht Race
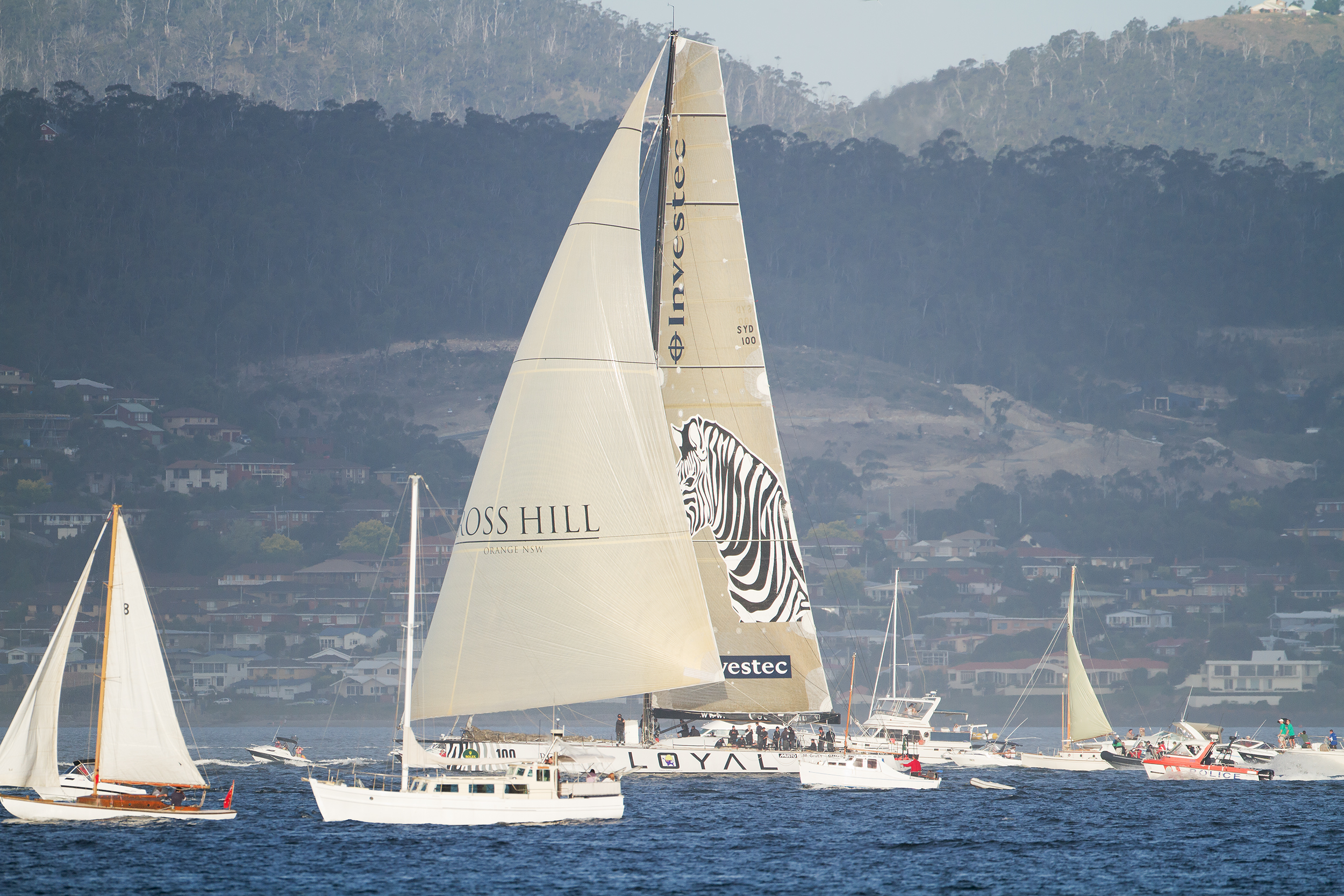
- Investec LOYAL about to win the 2011 Sydney to Hobart

Event information
- Type: Yacht
- Dates: 26–31 December 2011
- Sponsor: Rolex
- Host city: Sydney, Hobart
- Boats: 88
- Distance: 628 nautical miles (1,163 km)
- Website: Website archive

Results
- Winner (2011): Investec LOYAL (Anthony Bell)

Succession
- Previous: Wild Oats XI (Mark Richards) in 2010
- Next: Wild Oats XI (Mark Richards) in 2012

The 2011 Sydney to Hobart Yacht Race, sponsored by Rolex and hosted by the Cruising Yacht Club of Australia in Sydney, New South Wales, was the 67th annual running of the "blue water classic" Sydney to Hobart Yacht Race. The 2011 edition began on Sydney Harbour at 1pm on Boxing Day (26 December 2011) before heading south for 628 nautical miles (1,163 km) through the Tasman Sea, past Bass Strait, into Storm Bay and up the River Derwent, to cross the finish line in Hobart, Tasmania.

Line honours were claimed by Investec LOYAL in a time of two days, six hours, 14 minutes and 18 seconds after taking the lead from race favourite and defending champion Wild Oats XI, who had lost their lead outside Storm Bay after hitting light winds. After fighting to keep the lead up the River Derwent, the Investec LOYAL crossed the finish line just three minutes and twelve seconds ahead of Wild Oats XI. They held the line honour title even after the race committee raised a protest against Loyal, arguing that they "ask[ed] a third party for assistance during the race," but the race jury dismissed the complaint.

Loki (Stephen Ainsworth) won her first 2011 Tattersall's Cup with an overall handicap time of 3:00:22:34. Another Challenge was skippered by Jessica Watson, the youngest person to complete a nonstop, unassisted solo sail around the globe at 17.

There were 88 starters.

== Results ==
=== Line Honours ===
Pos	Sail Number	Yacht	State/Country	Yacht Type	LOA (Metres)	Skipper	Elapsed time d:hh:mm:ss
1	SYD 100	Investec LOYAL	New South Wales	Elliott Maxi	30.48	Anthony Bell	2:06:14:38
2	10001	Wild Oats XI	New South Wales	Reichel Pugh 100	30.48	Mark Richards	2:06:17:26
3	10081	Lahana	New South Wales	Bakewell-White 30m Maxi	30.00	Peter Millard; John Honan	2:12:34:26
4	AUS60000	Loki	New South Wales	Reichel Pugh 63	19.20	Stephen Ainsworth	2:14:20:38
5	GBR8055	Hugo Boss	(United Kingdom) Great Britain	Juan-K IMOCA Open 60	18.18	Alex Thomson	2:16:38:38
6	R55	Living Doll	(Victoria (state)) Victoria	Farr 55	16.76	Michael Hiatt	2:19:46:05
7	AUS03	Ichi Ban	New South Wales	Jones 70	21.50	Matt Allen	2:19:58:00
8	SM5252	Calm	(Victoria (state)) Victoria	Farr TP 52	15.85	Jason Van der Slot; John Williams; Graeme Ainley	2:23:42:55
9	5299	Jazz	New South Wales	Farr Cookson 50	15.20	Chris Bull	2:23:53:56
10	AUS70	Ragamuffin	New South Wales	Farr TP 52	15.85	Syd Fischer	3:00:04:42
11	SM11	Scarlet Runner	(Victoria (state)) Victoria	Reichel Pugh 52	15.99	Robert Date	3:03:10:44
12	10000	Brindabella	New South Wales	Jutson 79	24.08	Jim Cooney	3:03:27:00
13	5200	Cougar II	Tasmania	Farr TP 52	15.85	Anthony Lyall	3:05:37:32
14	6952	Shogun	(Victoria (state)) Victoria	Judel Vroljik TP 52	15.85	Rob Hanna	3:06:27:56
15	NOR2	Southern Excellence	New South Wales	Davidson Volvo Ocean 60	19.44	Andrew Wenham	3:08:15:18
16	GBR5211L	Strewth	Hong Kong	Donovan TP 52	15.85	Geoff Hill	3:09:25:50
17	43218	Vamp	New South Wales	Corby 49	14.90	Garry Linacre; David Fuller; Peter Wrigley	3:13:48:55
18	CR1	Optimus Prime	Western Australia	Reichel Pugh Marten 49	15.05	Trevor Taylor	3:22:50:52
19	HY1407	Knee Deep	Western Australia	Farr 49	15.28	Philip Childs	3:22:51:23
20	8679	Merit	Queensland	Farr Volvo Ocean 60	19.44	Leo Rodriguez	3:22:55:28
21	8338	AFR Midnight Rambler	New South Wales	Ker 40	12.20	Bob Thomas; Ed Psaltis; Michael Bencsik	3:22:58:15
22	7771	Balance	New South Wales	Briand Beneteau 45	13.68	Paul Clitheroe	3:23:06:31
23	1545	Victoire	New South Wales	Beneteau First 45	13.90	Darryl Hodgkinson	3:23:12:47 ^{1}
24	R33	Chutzpah	(Victoria (state)) Victoria	Reichel Pugh Caprice 40	12.00	Bruce Taylor	4:00:23:37
25	RQ64	Ocean Affinity	Queensland	Reichel Pugh Marten 49	15.00	Stewart Lewis	4:00:35:52
26	NZL1	NSC Mahligai	New South Wales	Murray Burns Dovell Sydney 46	14.30	Murray Owen; Jenny Kings	4:00:56:06
27	6837	Minerva	New South Wales	Reichel Pugh DK43	13.02	Timothy & Edward Cox	4:00:59:33
28	R420	Cadibarra 8	(Victoria (state)) Victoria	Jones 42	12.90	Paul Roberts	4:01:00:14
29	AUS88	Wasabi	New South Wales	Sayer 12 MOD	11.99	Bruce McKay	4:01:09:20
30	6686	St Jude	New South Wales	Murray Burns Dovell Sydney 47	14.20	Noel Cornish	4:01:12:42
31	360	Patrice Six	New South Wales	Jeppesen X41	12.35	Tony Kirby	4:01:17:23
32	8975	Last Tango	New South Wales	J&J Yachts Salona 44	13.50	Phillip King	4:01:25:09
33	YC400	Two True	South Australia	Farr Beneteau First 40	12.24	Andrew Saies	4:01:26:02
34	MH60	TSA Management	New South Wales	Murray Burns Dovell Sydney 38	11.78	Tony Levett	4:01:31:55
35	A6	Dump Truck	Tasmania	Ker 11.3	11.40	Justin Wells; Edward Fader	4:01:32:03
36	RQ14	Lunchtime Legend	Queensland	Farr Beneteau First 40	12.24	Robert Robertson	4:01:36:51
37	2004	Ella Bache	New South Wales	Murray Burns Dovell Sydney 38	11.78	Jessica Watson	4:02:12:58
38	7027	The Goat	New South Wales	Murray Burns Dovell Sydney 38	11.78	Bruce Foye; Tony Clift	4:02:16:41
39	S390	Jazz Player	(Victoria (state)) Victoria	Bakewell-White 39	11.92	Andrew Lawrence	4:02:24:57
40	4343	Wild Rose	New South Wales	Farr 43	13.11	Roger Hickman	4:02:26:28
41	8488	Dodo	New South Wales	Murray Burns Dovell Sydney 38	11.78	Adrian Dunphy	4:02:39:57
42	6841	Papillon	New South Wales	Joubert Nivelt Archambault 40RC	11.99	Phil Molony	4:02:42:35
43	2005	Deloitte As One	New South Wales	Murray Burns Dovell Sydney 38	11.78	Chris Lewin	4:02:43:47
44	FRA29999	L'Ange De Milon	France	Jeppesen X43	12.00	Jacques Pelletier	4:02:45:15
45	L77	Whistler	Tasmania	Murray Burns Dowell MBD36	11.00	David Rees	4:02:52:44
46	R6572	Icefire	New South Wales	Mummery 45	13.90	Peter Tucker	4:03:19:43
47	N40	One For The Road	New South Wales	Joubert Nivelt Archambault 40	12.00	Kym Butler	4:03:24:41
48	4100	The Banshee	New South Wales	Murray Burns Dowell MBD41	12.50	Corinne Feldmann; Rob Francis	4:04:06:53
49	S37	Kiss Goodbye to MS	(Victoria (state)) Victoria	Inglis 39	11.90	Tony Warren	4:04:24:04
50	2001	Quetzalcoatl	New South Wales	Jones 40	12.33	Antony Sweetapple	4:05:27:38
51	YC271	Patrice IV	South Australia	Briand Beneteau First 45	13.70	Garry Tucker; Shane Wiseman	4:05:31:34
52	335	Willyama	New South Wales	Farr Beneteau First 40	12.24	Richard Barron	4:06:11:38
53	5656	Mondo	Queensland	Murray Burns Dovell Sydney 38	11.78	Ray Sweeney	4:06:17:53
54	RQ2001	Sweethart	Queensland	Jutson 39	11.87	Laurence Pidgeon	4:06:37:42
55	SM381	Mille Sabords	(Victoria (state)) Victoria	Murray Burns Dovell Sydney 38	11.78	Stephane Howarth	4:06:48:14
56	USA315	Carina	United States	Kauffman-McCurdy & Rhodes 48	14.63	Rives Potts	4:07:02:27 ^{2}
57	M161	LMR Solar	New South Wales	Sayer 40	11.60	Michael Martin	4:07:30:30
58	NZ9138	Outrageous Fortune	New Zealand	Briand Beneteau First 45	14.00	Quintin Fowler	4:08:04:38 ^{3}
59	M24	Menace	New South Wales	Phillips-Simpson 11.7	11.68	Niven James	4:10:02:11
60	88888	Samurai Jack	Queensland	Farr 39 ML Mod	12.00	Noel Humphries; Michael Lazzarini	4:11:16:01
61	7551	Flying Fish-Arctos	New South Wales	Radford McIntyre 55	16.36	John Naylor	4:11:59:30
62	7075	Martela	Tasmania	Jeppesen IMX 38	11.30	Anthony Williams	4:15:49:09
63	6689	Copernicus	New South Wales	Radford 12	11.99	Greg Zyner	4:17:01:17
64	7407	Wave Sweeper	New South Wales	Farr Beneteau First 40.7	11.90	Morgan Rogers; Andrey Arbuzov	4:17:57:45
65	SM3500	Nutcracker	(Victoria (state)) Victoria	Jeppesen X35	10.60	Robert Davis; David Clancy	4:19:00:23
66	6834	Chancellor	New South Wales	Farr Beneteau First 40	12.20	Ted Tooher	4:19:11:11
67	SM377	Bacardi	(Victoria (state)) Victoria	Peterson 44	13.34	Martin Power	4:19:35:55
68	6146	Kioni	New South Wales	Farr Beneteau First 47.7	14.80	Nick Athineos; Rowan McColl	4:19:58:37
69	4924	She	New South Wales	Mull Olsen 40	12.23	Peter Rodgers	4:22:43:21
70	N3	Aurora	New South Wales	Farr 40 One Off	12.21	Jim Holley	5:00:00:00
71	M25	Fullynpushing	(Victoria (state)) Victoria	Murray Burns Dovell Sydney 38	11.78	Andrew Griffiths	5:00:37:00
72	2555	Natelle Two	Tasmania	Peterson 41	12.40	Laura Roper	5:01:03:12 ^{4}
73	S521	Not Negotiable	Tasmania	Holman & Pye UFO 34	10.50	John Rayner	5:02:56:14
74	6590	Eressea	Queensland	Hanse 400	12.00	John Bankart	5:03:30:49
76	USA69200	Nemesis	United States	C&C Yachts C&C 41	12.00	Jeffery Taylor	5:03:32:05
77	A19	Maluka of Kermandie	Tasmania	Gale Ranger 30	9.01	Sean & Peter Langman	5:03:48:22
DNF	8362	Accenture Yeah Baby	New South Wales	Botin & Carkeek GP42	12.80	Marc Ryckmans	Retired-Gear Failure
DNF	7447	Alacrity	Queensland	Farr Beneteau First 44.7	13.35	Matthew & Chris Percy	Retired-Rig Damage
DNF	5976	Alchemy III	Tasmania	Farr Beneteau 57	17.80	Jarrod Ritchie	Retired-Rig Damage
DNF	G421	Celestial	New South Wales	Rogers 46	14.00	Sam Haynes	Retired-Broken Gooseneck
DNF	67	Colortile	New South Wales	Sayer 44.9	13.70	Warren Buchan; Kristy Edwards	Retired-Rig Damage
DNF	ESP6100	Duende	New South Wales	Judel Vrolijk TP 52	15.85	Damien Parkes	Retired-Engine Problems
DNF	R2099	Elektra	New South Wales	Farr Beneteau 47.7	14.50	Peter Gregory	Retired-Engine Problems
DNF	HKG2238	Ffreefire 52	Hong Kong	Andrews TP 52	15.85	Anthony Day	Retired-Mainsail Track Damage
DNF	5356	Illusion	New South Wales	Davidson 34	10.40	Jonathan Stone	Retired-Hull Damage
DNF	10007	Pretty Fly III	New South Wales	Farr Cookson 50	15.24	Colin Woods	Retired-Undisclosed Reasons
DNF	11407	Shepherd Centre	New South Wales	Farr Beneteau 40.7	11.92	Hugh Torode	Retired-Disqualified ^{5}
DNF	M10	Wild Thing	Queensland	Jones IRC Maxi	30.00	Grant Wharington	Retired-Sail Damage

Notes

^1 – Victoire were given a 20 minutes penalty to be added onto their elapsed time by the International Jury due to failing to maintain a continuous listening watch on the race radio frequencies for the duration of their race as required by Sailing Instruction 40.7 (Radio Transmissions).
^2 – Carina were given a 20 minutes penalty to be added onto their elapsed time by the International Jury due to failing to maintain a continuous listening watch on the race radio frequencies for the duration of their race as required by Sailing Instruction 40.7 (Radio Transmissions).
^3 – Outrageous Fortune were given a 20 minutes penalty to be added onto their elapsed time by the International Jury due to failing to maintain a continuous listening watch on the race radio frequencies for the duration of their race as required by Sailing Instruction 40.7 (Radio Transmissions).
^4 – Natelle Two were given a 60 minutes penalty to be added onto their elapsed time by the International Jury due to failing to maintain a continuous listening watch on the race radio frequencies for the duration of their race as required by Sailing Instruction 40.7 (Radio Transmissions).
^5 – Shepherd Centre were disqualified from the race and was scored as a DNF by the Race Committee due to breaching Sailing Instruction Rules 44.1 & 44.2 by failing to report into race control within one hour of passing the Green Cape mandatory safety check-in point before entering the Bass Strait during the race.

=== Overall Handicap ===
Pos	Division	Sail Number	Yacht	State/Country	Yacht Type	LOA (Metres)	Skipper	Corrected time d:hh:mm:ss
1	1	AUS60000	Loki	New South Wales	Reichel Pugh 63	19.20	Stephen Ainsworth	3:22:34:32
2	1	R55	Living Doll	(Victoria (state)) Victoria	Farr 55	16.76	Michael Hiatt	3:23:25:03
3	1	AUS70	Ragamuffin	New South Wales	Farr TP 52	15.85	Syd Fischer	4:01:22:40
4	0	5299	Jazz	New South Wales	Farr Cookson 50	15.20	Chris Bull	4:01:29:42
5	1	SM5252	Calm	(Victoria (state)) Victoria	Farr TP 52	15.85	Jason Van der Slot; John Williams; Graeme Ainley	4:01:31:58
6	0	10081	Lahana	New South Wales	Bakewell-White 30m Maxi	30.00	Peter Millard; John Honan	4:05:56:45
7	4	4343	Wild Rose	New South Wales	Farr 43	13.11	Roger Hickman	4:06:05:00
8	1	SM11	Scarlet Runner	(Victoria (state)) Victoria	Reichel Pugh 52	15.99	Robert Date	4:06:28:08
9	0	SYD 100	Investec LOYAL	New South Wales	Elliott Maxi	30.48	Anthony Bell	4:07:38:58
10	4	L77	Whistler	Tasmania	Murray Burns Dowell MBD36	11.00	David Rees	4:09:00:34
11	1	5200	Cougar II	Tasmania	Farr TP 52	15.85	Anthony Lyall	4:09:24:56
12	4	RQ14	Lunchtime Legend	Queensland	Farr Beneteau First 40	12.24	Robert Robertson	4:09:31:15
13	4	YC400	Two True	South Australia	Farr Beneteau First 40	12.24	Andrew Saies	4:09:31:15
14	0	10001	Wild Oats XI	New South Wales	Reichel Pugh 100	30.48	Mark Richards	4:10:05:01
15	1	6952	Shogun	(Victoria (state)) Victoria	Judel Vroljik TP 52	15.85	Rob Hanna	4:11:01:37
16	4	FRA29999	L'Ange De Milon	France	Jeppesen X43	12.00	Jacques Pelletier	4:11:02:58
17	3	1545	Victoire	New South Wales	Beneteau First 45	13.90	Darryl Hodgkinson	4:11:35:27
18	3	7771	Balance	New South Wales	Briand Beneteau 45	13.68	Paul Clitheroe	4:11:39:47
19	3	6841	Papillon	New South Wales	Joubert Nivelt Archambault 40RC	11.99	Phil Molony	4:11:47:28
20	3	MH60	TSA Management	New South Wales	Murray Burns Dovell Sydney 38	11.78	Tony Levett	4:11:58:04
21	4	USA315	Carina	United States	Kauffman-McCurdy & Rhodes 48	14.63	Rives Potts	4:12:05:23
22	0	GBR8055	Hugo Boss	(United Kingdom) Great Britain	Juan-K IMOCA Open 60	18.18	Alex Thomson	4:12:08:57
23	3	8488	Dodo	New South Wales	Murray Burns Dovell Sydney 38	11.78	Adrian Dunphy	4:12:31:57
24	3	7027	The Goat	New South Wales	Murray Burns Dovell Sydney 38	11.78	Bruce Foye; Tony Clift	4:12:35:50
25	0	AUS03	Ichi Ban	New South Wales	Jones 70	21.50	Matt Allen	4:12:40:43
26	2	43218	Vamp	New South Wales	Corby 49	14.90	Garry Linacre; David Fuller; Peter Wrigley	4:12:53:59
27	3	360	Patrice Six	New South Wales	Jeppesen X41	12.35	Tony Kirby	4:13:03:42
28	3	8975	Last Tango	New South Wales	J&J Yachts Salona 44	13.50	Phillip King	4:13:18:15
29	3	2004	Ella Bache	New South Wales	Murray Burns Dovell Sydney 38	11.78	Jessica Watson	4:13:18:52
30	1	GBR5211L	Strewth	Hong Kong	Donovan TP 52	15.85	Geoff Hill	4:13:46:06
31	3	2005	Deloitte As One	New South Wales	Murray Burns Dovell Sydney 38	11.78	Chris Lewin	4:13:53:10
32	3	N40	One For The Road	New South Wales	Joubert Nivelt Archambault 40	12.00	Kym Butler	4:14:26:46
33	4	335	Willyama	New South Wales	Farr Beneteau First 40	12.24	Richard Barron	4:14:34:26
34	4	A19	Maluka of Kermandie	Tasmania	Gale Ranger 30	9.01	Sean & Peter Langman	4:15:18:06
35	2	A6	Dump Truck	Tasmania	Ker 11.3	11.40	Justin Wells; Edward Fader	4:16:15:43
36	3	YC271	Patrice IV	South Australia	Briand Beneteau First 45	13.70	Garry Tucker; Shane Wiseman	4:16:29:27
37	3	RQ2001	Sweethart	Queensland	Jutson 39	11.87	Laurence Pidgeon	4:16:47:19
38	1	10000	Brindabella	New South Wales	Jutson 79	24.08	Jim Cooney	4:16:56:55
39	4	S521	Not Negotiable	Tasmania	Holman & Pye UFO 34	10.50	John Rayner	4:17:06:08
40	3	SM381	Mille Sabords	(Victoria (state)) Victoria	Murray Burns Dovell Sydney 38	11.78	Stephane Howarth	4:17:11:13
41	2	S390	Jazz Player	(Victoria (state)) Victoria	Bakewell-White 39	11.92	Andrew Lawrence	4:17:22:30
42	3	5656	Mondo	Queensland	Murray Burns Dovell Sydney 38	11.78	Ray Sweeney	4:17:26:55
43	2	8338	AFR Midnight Rambler	New South Wales	Ker 40	12.20	Bob Thomas; Ed Psaltis; Michael Bencsik	4:17:35:06
44	2	6837	Minerva	New South Wales	Reichel Pugh DK43	13.02	Timothy & Edward Cox	4:17:46:20
45	2	6686	St Jude	New South Wales	Murray Burns Dovell Sydney 47	14.20	Noel Cornish	4:18:36:45
46	2	S37	Kiss Goodbye to MS	(Victoria (state)) Victoria	Inglis 39	11.90	Tony Warren	4:18:57:33
47	2	R33	Chutzpah	(Victoria (state)) Victoria	Reichel Pugh Caprice 40	12.00	Bruce Taylor	4:20:03:28
48	3	NZ9138	Outrageous Fortune	New Zealand	Briand Beneteau First 45	14.00	Quintin Fowler	4:20:40:14
49	4	7075	Martela	Tasmania	Jeppesen IMX 38	11.30	Anthony Williams	4:21:11:11
50	2	R420	Cadibarra 8	(Victoria (state)) Victoria	Jones 42	12.90	Paul Roberts	4:21:45:46
51	2	CR1	Optimus Prime	Western Australia	Reichel Pugh Marten 49	15.05	Trevor Taylor	4:22:16:31
52	2	R6572	Icefire	New South Wales	Mummery 45	13.90	Peter Tucker	4:23:23:35
53	4	SM377	Bacardi	(Victoria (state)) Victoria	Peterson 44	13.34	Martin Power	5:00:27:14
54	2	HY1407	Knee Deep	Western Australia	Farr 49	15.28	Philip Childs	5:00:33:45
55	4	7407	Wave Sweeper	New South Wales	Farr Beneteau First 40.7	11.90	Morgan Rogers; Andrey Arbuzov	5:00:34:22
56	4	SM3500	Nutcracker	(Victoria (state)) Victoria	Jeppesen X35	10.60	Robert Davis; David Clancy	5:00:38:30
57	2	RQ64	Ocean Affinity	Queensland	Reichel Pugh Marten 49	15.00	Stewart Lewis	5:00:44:50
58	4	6689	Copernicus	New South Wales	Radford 12	11.99	Greg Zyner	5:00:55:58
59	4	6834	Chancellor	New South Wales	Farr Beneteau First 40	12.20	Ted Tooher	5:03:35:42
60	4	2555	Natelle Two	Tasmania	Peterson 41	12.40	Laura Roper	5:04:19:18
61	4	N3	Aurora	New South Wales	Farr 40 One Off	12.21	Jim Holley	5:05:24:00
DNF	2	8362	Accenture Yeah Baby	New South Wales	Botin & Carkeek GP42	12.80	Marc Ryckmans	Retired-Gear Failure
DNF	3	7447	Alacrity	Queensland	Farr Beneteau First 44.7	13.35	Matthew & Chris Percy	Retired-Rig Damage
DNF	3	5976	Alchemy III	Tasmania	Farr Beneteau 57	17.80	Jarrod Ritchie	Retired-Rig Damage
DNF	2	G421	Celestial	New South Wales	Rogers 46	14.00	Sam Haynes	Retired-Broken Gooseneck
DNF	2	67	Colortile	New South Wales	Sayer 44.9	13.70	Warren Buchan; Kristy Edwards	Retired-Rig Damage
DNF	1	ESP6100	Duende	New South Wales	Judel Vrolijk TP 52	15.85	Damien Parkes	Retired-Engine Problems
DNF	1	HKG2238	Ffreefire 52	Hong Kong	Andrews TP 52	15.85	Anthony Day	Retired-Mainsail Track Damage
DNF	4	5356	Illusion	New South Wales	Davidson 34	10.40	Jonathan Stone	Retired-Hull Damage
DNF	0	10007	Pretty Fly III	New South Wales	Farr Cookson 50	15.24	Colin Woods	Retired-Undisclosed Reasons
DNF	4	11407	Shepherd Centre	New South Wales	Farr Beneteau 40.7	11.92	Hugh Torode	Retired-Disqualified ^{1}
DNF	0	M10	Wild Thing	Queensland	Jones IRC Maxi	30.00	Grant Wharington	Retired-Sail Damage

Notes

^1 – Shepherd Centre were disqualified from the race and was scored as a DNF by the Race Committee due to breaching Sailing Instruction Rules 44.1 & 44.2 by failing to report into race control within one hour of passing the Green Cape mandatory safety check-in point before entering the Bass Strait on the second day of the race.
