= 2010 Sydney to Hobart Yacht Race =

2010 annual yacht race in Australia

66th Sydney to Hobart Yacht Race
Event information
- Type: Yacht
- Dates: 26–31 December 2010
- Sponsor: Rolex
- Host city: Sydney, Hobart
- Boats: 87
- Distance: 628 nautical miles (1,163 km)
- Website: Website archive

Results
- Winner (2010): Wild Oats XI (Mark Richards)

Succession
- Previous: Alfa Romeo II (Neville Crichton) in 2009
- Next: Investec LOYAL (Anthony Bell) in 2011

The 2010 Sydney to Hobart Yacht Race, sponsored by Rolex and hosted by Cruising Yacht Club of Australia in Sydney, New South Wales, was the 66th annual running of the "blue water classic" Sydney to Hobart Yacht Race. The 2010 race began on Sydney Harbour, at 1pm on Boxing Day (26 December 2010), before heading south for 628 nautical miles (1,163 km) through the Tasman Sea, past Bass Strait, into Storm Bay and up the River Derwent, to cross the finish line in Hobart, Tasmania.

The race saw 87 starters but several were forced to retire due to the severe weather. In the end, 69 finished.

== Results ==
=== Line Honours ===
Pos	Sail Number	Yacht	State/Country	Yacht Type	LOA (Metres)	Skipper	Elapsed time d:hh:mm:ss
1	10001	Wild Oats XI	New South Wales	Reichel Pugh 100	30.48	Mark Richards	2:07:37:20
2	99999	Investec LOYAL	New South Wales	Elliot Maxi	30.48	Sean Langman; Anthony Bell	2:11:11:34
3	10081	Lahana	New South Wales	Bakewell-White 30m Maxi	30.00	Peter Millard; John Honan	2:14:09:44
4	AUS03	Ichi Ban	New South Wales	Jones 70	21.50	Matt Allen	2:16:52:55
5	M10	Wild Thing	(Victoria (state)) Victoria	Jones IRC Maxi	30.00	Grant Wharington	2:17:15:29
6	GBR7236R	Rán	(United Kingdom) Great Britain	Judel Vrolijk JV72	21.90	Niklas Zennström	2:17:22:55
7	AUS98888	Limit	Western Australia	Reichel Pugh 62	19.50	Alan Brierty	2:21:30:31
8	AUS60000	Loki	New South Wales	Reichel Pugh 63	19.20	Stephen Ainsworth	2:21:33:16
9	AUS11888	Rodd & Gunn Wedgetail	Queensland	Reichel Pugh RP55	16.80	Bill Wild	2:23:44:50
10	R55	Living Doll	(Victoria (state)) Victoria	Farr 55	16.76	Michael Hiatt	3:00:18:35
11	6952	Shogun	(Victoria (state)) Victoria	Judel Vroljik TP 52	15.85	Rob Hanna	3:00:18:54
12	5299	Jazz	New South Wales	Farr Cookson 50	15.24	Chris Bull	3:00:20:19
13	10007	Pretty Fly III	New South Wales	Farr Cookson 50	15.24	Colin Woods	3:00:33:18
14	YC3300	Secret Men's Business 3.5	South Australia	Reichel Pugh 51	15.64	Geoff Boettcher	3:00:42:10
15	SM24	Terra Firma	(Victoria (state)) Victoria	Farr Cookson 50	15.24	Nicholas Bartels	3:07:27:42
16	AUS70	Ragamuffin	New South Wales	Farr TP 52	15.85	Syd Fischer	3:07:43:15
17	43218	Vamp	Russia	Corby 49	14.90	Mikhail Muratov; Roger Hickman	3:08:36:59
18	8679	Merit	Queensland	Farr Volvo Ocean 60	19.44	Leo Rodriguez; Ian Bishop	3:09:18:53
19	GBR6821R	Titania of Cowes	(United Kingdom) Great Britain	Frers Swan 68	21.60	Richard Dobbs	3:12:11:29
20	R33	Chutzpah	(Victoria (state)) Victoria	Reichel Pugh Caprice 40	12.00	Bruce Taylor	3:13:03:30
21	1545	Victoire	New South Wales	Beneteau First 45	13.90	Darryl Hodgkinson	3:15:41:40
22	RQ64	Ocean Affinity	Queensland	Reichel Pugh Marten 49	15.00	Stewart Lewis	3:15:42:52
23	G4646R	Extasea	(Victoria (state)) Victoria	Mills DK46	14.10	Paul Buchholz	3:15:44:39
24	8338	AFR Midnight Rambler	New South Wales	Farr 40	12.41	Ed Psaltis	3:17:04:53
25	R420	Cadibarra 8	(Victoria (state)) Victoria	Jones 42	12.90	Paul Roberts	3:20:46:20
26	262	Helsal III	Tasmania	Adams 20	20.00	Tony & Rob Fisher	3:23:17:17
27	6686	St Jude	New South Wales	Murray Burns Dovell Sydney 47	14.20	Noel Cornish	3:23:31:37
28	1195	Valheru	Tasmania	Elliott 43	13.05	Anthony Lyall	3:23:42:32
29	RQ1331	Patriot	Queensland	J Yachts J133	13.10	Tony Love	3:23:56:51
30	NZL1	NSC Mahligai	New South Wales	Murray Burns Dovell Sydney 46	14.30	Murray Owen; Jenny Kings	4:00:09:23
31	360	Patrice Six	New South Wales	Jeppesen X41	12.35	Tony Kirby	4:00:17:51
32	8848	Dodo	New South Wales	Fa-Steinman Modified 66	20.15	Richard Christian	4:00:26:32
33	AUS88	Wasabi	New South Wales	Sayer 12 MOD	11.99	Bruce McKay	4:01:50:30
34	55555	Krakatoa II	New South Wales	Finot Pogo 40	12.19	Rod Skellet	4:01:57:34
35	H101	Tevake II	(Victoria (state)) Victoria	Radford 13.7	13.70	Angus Fletcher	4:02:02:10
36	6812	Paca	New South Wales	Farr Beneteau First 40	12.24	Philippe Mengual	4:02:08:45
37	MH60	Eleni	New South Wales	Murray Burns Dovell Sydney 38	11.78	Tony Levett	4:02:59:17
38	SM2004	Another Challenge	(Victoria (state)) Victoria	Murray Burns Dovell Sydney 38	11.78	Chris Lewin	4:02:59:46
39	3838	Zen	New South Wales	Murray Burns Dovell Sydney 38	11.78	Gordon Ketelbey	4:03:27:06
40	FRA29999	L'Ange De Milon	France	Jeppesen X43	12.00	Jacques Pelletier	4:03:30:58
41	6935	L'Altra Donna	New South Wales	Mills Summit 35	10.70	Andy Kearnan	4:03:59:53
42	6689	Copernicus	New South Wales	Radford 12	11.99	Greg Zyner	4:04:14:22
43	370	She's The Culprit	Tasmania	Jones 39	11.96	Todd Leary	4:04:21:29
44	M161	LMR Solar	New South Wales	Sayer 40	11.60	Michael Martin	4:04:38:13
45	1236	Local Hero	New South Wales	Murray Burns Dovell BH36	10.97	Peter Mosely	4:04:46:09 ^{1}
46	8300	Secret Mens Business #1	New South Wales	Murray 42	12.75	Ross Trembath; Rob Curtis	4:05:03:05
47	7551	Flying Fish-Arctos	New South Wales	Radford McIntyre 55	16.36	Martin Silk	4:05:15:17
48	2170	Ray White Spirit of Koomooloo	Queensland	Sparkman & Stephens S&S 48	14.80	Mike Freebairn	4:06:48:11
49	11407	Shepherd Centre	New South Wales	Farr Beneteau 40.7	11.92	Hugh Torode	4:07:44:11
50	SM25	Scarlet Ribbon	(Victoria (state)) Victoria	Stanton Buizen 48	14.60	Richard Buxton	4:09:03:06
51	2999	Obsession	New South Wales	Murray Burns Dovell Sydney 38	11.78	Andrew Lygo	4:09:06:57
52	6834	Chancellor	New South Wales	Farr Beneteau First 40	12.20	Ted Tooher	4:09:13:20
53	M9000	Geomatic Joker	(Victoria (state)) Victoria	Lyons Jarken 38	11.96	Grant Chipperfield	4:09:16:49
54	ITASM455	Onelife	Italy	Amel 52	16.00	Alberto Biffignandi	4:10:26:35
55	6321	Allegro	New South Wales	Davidson Cavalier 395	12.00	John Taylor	5:00:54:11
56	SM381	Mille Sabords	(Victoria (state)) Victoria	Murray Burns Dovell Sydney 38	11.78	Stephane Howarth	5:00:56:38
57	5900	Wahoo	New South Wales	Frers 40	12.35	Graham Mulligan	5:00:56:54
58	N3	Aurora	New South Wales	Farr 40 One Off	12.21	Jim Holley	5:00:58:56
59	142	Crossbow	New South Wales	Farr Beneteau First 36.7	10.70	David Cutcliffe; Dawn Murray; David Stenhouse	5:01:07:53
60	5612	Abracadabra	New South Wales	Tripp 47	14.33	James Murchison	5:01:18:49
61	407	Blunderbuss	Queensland	Farr Beneteau First 40.7	11.90	Tony Kinsman	5:01:21:40
62	4924	She	New South Wales	Mull Olsen 40	12.23	Peter Rodgers	5:01:22:34
63	USA21847	Dawn Star	United States	Baltic 46	14.10	William Hubbard III	5:01:47:36 ^{2}
64	F111	CIC Secure Inca	Australian Capital Territory	Lavranos Vickers 41 MkII	12.50	Noel Sneddon	5:02:26:31
65	SM5558	Young Ones	(Victoria (state)) Victoria	Young 11 Mod	11.00	Ian Miller	5:02:56:59
66	5356	Illusion	New South Wales	Davidson 34	10.40	Jonathan Stone	5:03:00:36
67	RQ1920	Charlie's Dream	Queensland	Holland-Cole-Lowe Bluewater 450	13.70	Peter Lewis	5:03:39:49
68	5527	Polaris of Belmont	New South Wales	Cole 43	13.20	Chris Dawe	5:03:42:56
69	7407	Wave Sweeper	New South Wales	Farr Beneteau First 40.7	11.90	Morgan Rogers	5:06:08:30
DNF	5976	Alchemy III	Tasmania	Farr Beneteau 57	17.80	Jarrod Ritchie	Retired-Boom Damage
DNF	SM377	Bacardi	(Victoria (state)) Victoria	Peterson 44	13.34	Martin Power	Retired-Broken Mast
DNF	10000	Brindabella	New South Wales	Jutson 79	24.08	Jim Cooney	Retired-Damaged Mainsail
DNF	SM5252	Calm	(Victoria (state)) Victoria	Farr TP 52	15.85	Jason Van der Slot; John Williams; Graeme Ainley	Retired-Undisclosed Reasons
DNF	46	Exile	New South Wales	Mills DK46	14.10	Rob Reynolds	Retired-Steering Damage
DNF	S390	Jazz Player	(Victoria (state)) Victoria	Bakewell-White 39	11.92	Andrew Lawrence	Retired-Damaged Mainsail
DNF	A169	Nautical Circle	New South Wales	Nivelt Archambault 40	12.00	Matthew Prentice	Retired-Engine Problems
DNF	USA69200	Nemesis	United States	C&C Yachts C&C 41	12.00	Jeffery Taylor	Retired-Undisclosed Reasons
DNF	421	Pirelli Celestial	New South Wales	Rogers 46	14.00	Sam Haynes	Retired-Sail Damage
DNF	8975	Salona II	New South Wales	J&J Yachts Salona 44	11.29	Phillip King	Retired-Steering Problems
DNF	SM11	Scarlet Runner	(Victoria (state)) Victoria	Reichel Pugh 52	15.99	Robert Dale	Retired-Sail Damage
DNF	M330	Shamrock	(Victoria (state)) Victoria	Reichel Pugh 47	14.21	Tony Donnellan	Retired-Damage to Rudder Bearing
DNF	6338	Shining Sea	South Australia	Murray Burns Dovell Sydney 38	11.78	Andrew Corletto	Retired-Broken Rudder
DNF	NOR2	Southern Excellence	New South Wales	Davidson Volvo Ocean 60	19.44	Andrew Wenham	Retired-Rig Failure
DNF	6073	Swish	New South Wales	Murray Burns Dovell Sydney 38	11.78	Steven Proud	Retired-Radio Damage
DNF	YC400	Two True	South Australia	Farr Beneteau First 40	12.24	Andrew Saies	Retired-Engine Problems
DNF	6953	Wot Eva	New South Wales	Nelson Marek TP 52	15.85	David Pescud	Retired-Engine Problems
DNF	AUS11111	YuuZoo	New South Wales	Simonis Voogd Maxi	27.38	Ludde Ingvall	Retired-Torn Headsail

Notes

^1 – Local Hero were given a 30 minutes redress to be subtracted off their elapsed time under RRS 62.1(c) by the International Jury due to an incident where their provided assistance after Bacardi broke her mast on the second day of the race.
^2 – Dawn Star were given a 40 minutes redress to be subtracted off their elapsed time under RRS 62.1(c) by the International Jury due to an incident where their provided assistance by locating and sinking a liferaft after it was lost from Titania of Cowes on the first day of the race.

=== Overall Handicap ===
Pos	Division	Sail Number	Yacht	State/Country	Yacht Type	LOA (Metres)	Skipper	Corrected time d:hh:mm:ss
1	1	YC3300	Secret Men's Business 3.5	South Australia	Reichel Pugh 51	15.64	Geoff Boettcher	4:01:29:40
2	0	5299	Jazz	New South Wales	Farr Cookson 50	15.24	Chris Bull	4:02:05:28
3	1	6952	Shogun	(Victoria (state)) Victoria	Judel Vroljik TP 52	15.85	Rob Hanna	4:02:07:53
4	0	10007	Pretty Fly III	New South Wales	Farr Cookson 50	15.24	Colin Woods	4:02:49:12
5	2	1545	Victoire	New South Wales	Beneteau First 45	13.90	Darryl Hodgkinson	4:03:05:41
6	1	AUS11888	Rodd & Gunn Wedgetail	Queensland	Reichel Pugh RP55	16.80	Bill Wild	4:04:35:23
7	1	R55	Living Doll	(Victoria (state)) Victoria	Farr 55	16.76	Michael Hiatt	4:04:52:19
8	1	GBR7236R	Rán	(United Kingdom) Great Britain	Judel Vrolijk JV72	21.90	Niklas Zennström	4:06:11:31
9	2	43218	Vamp	Russia	Corby 49	14.90	Mikhail Muratov; Roger Hickman	4:06:18:08
10	2	R33	Chutzpah	(Victoria (state)) Victoria	Reichel Pugh Caprice 40	12.00	Bruce Taylor	4:06:50:08
11	2	8338	AFR Midnight Rambler	New South Wales	Farr 40	12.41	Ed Psaltis	4:07:04:02
12	1	SM24	Terra Firma	(Victoria (state)) Victoria	Farr Cookson 50	15.24	Nicholas Bartels	4:07:51:23
13	0	10081	Lahana	New South Wales	Bakewell-White 30m Maxi	30.00	Peter Millard; John Honan	4:08:03:34
14	1	AUS98888	Limit	Western Australia	Reichel Pugh 62	19.50	Alan Brierty	4:08:11:36
15	1	AUS60000	Loki	New South Wales	Reichel Pugh 63	19.20	Stephen Ainsworth	4:08:19:54
16	0	AUS03	Ichi Ban	New South Wales	Jones 70	21.50	Matt Allen	4:08:31:29
17	2	G4646R	Extasea	(Victoria (state)) Victoria	Mills DK46	14.10	Paul Buchholz	4:09:28:07
18	4	2170	Ray White Spirit of Koomooloo	Queensland	Sparkman & Stephens S&S 48	14.80	Mike Freebairn	4:09:34:43
19	4	6935	L'Altra Donna	New South Wales	Mills Summit 35	10.70	Andy Kearnan	4:10:17:53
20	4	1236	Local Hero	New South Wales	Murray Burns Dovell BH36	10.97	Peter Mosely	4:10:24:45
21	2	GBR6821R	Titania of Cowes	(United Kingdom) Great Britain	Frers Swan 68	21.60	Richard Dobbs	4:10:25:04
22	3	6812	Paca	New South Wales	Farr Beneteau First 40	12.24	Philippe Mengual	4:10:29:18
23	0	10001	Wild Oats XI	New South Wales	Reichel Pugh 100	30.48	Mark Richards	4:11:04:22
24	1	AUS70	Ragamuffin	New South Wales	Farr TP 52	15.85	Syd Fischer	4:11:08:41
25	3	RQ1331	Patriot	Queensland	J Yachts J133	13.10	Tony Love	4:11:16:09
26	3	6689	Copernicus	New South Wales	Radford 12	11.99	Greg Zyner	4:11:33:25
27	3	FRA29999	L'Ange De Milon	France	Jeppesen X43	12.00	Jacques Pelletier	4:12:04:28
28	2	360	Patrice Six	New South Wales	Jeppesen X41	12.35	Tony Kirby	4:12:20:05
29	3	MH60	Eleni	New South Wales	Murray Burns Dovell Sydney 38	11.78	Tony Levett	4:13:22:54
30	2	RQ64	Ocean Affinity	Queensland	Reichel Pugh Marten 49	15.00	Stewart Lewis	4:13:54:22
31	3	3838	Zen	New South Wales	Murray Burns Dovell Sydney 38	11.78	Gordon Ketelbey	4:13:59:37
32	3	SM2004	Another Challenge	(Victoria (state)) Victoria	Murray Burns Dovell Sydney 38	11.78	Chris Lewin	4:14:16:54
33	4	11407	Shepherd Centre	New South Wales	Farr Beneteau 40.7	11.92	Hugh Torode	4:14:34:59
34	2	R420	Cadibarra 8	(Victoria (state)) Victoria	Jones 42	12.90	Paul Roberts	4:16:37:32
35	2	6686	St Jude	New South Wales	Murray Burns Dovell Sydney 47	14.20	Noel Cornish	4:16:37:35
36	0	99999	Investec LOYAL	New South Wales	Elliot Maxi	30.48	Sean Langman; Anthony Bell	4:16:59:56
37	3	6834	Chancellor	New South Wales	Farr Beneteau First 40	12.20	Ted Tooher	4:17:25:46
38	2	370	She's The Culprit	Tasmania	Jones 39	11.96	Todd Leary	4:18:12:27
39	3	M9000	Geomatic Joker	(Victoria (state)) Victoria	Lyons Jarken 38	11.96	Grant Chipperfield	4:19:04:17
40	2	H101	Tevake II	(Victoria (state)) Victoria	Radford 13.7	13.70	Angus Fletcher	4:20:16:15
41	2	8300	Secret Mens Business #1	New South Wales	Murray 42	12.75	Ross Trembath; Rob Curtis	4:21:01:03
42	0	M10	Wild Thing	(Victoria (state)) Victoria	Jones IRC Maxi	30.00	Grant Wharington	5:00:35:49
43	4	5356	Illusion	New South Wales	Davidson 34	10.40	Jonathan Stone	5:02:31:05
44	4	6321	Allegro	New South Wales	Davidson Cavalier 395	12.00	John Taylor	5:03:12:01
45	4	142	Crossbow	New South Wales	Farr Beneteau First 36.7	10.70	David Cutcliffe; Dawn Murray; David Stenhouse	5:04:09:35
46	4	USA21847	Dawn Star	United States	Baltic 46	14.10	William Hubbard III	5:04:35:41
47	4	5900	Wahoo	New South Wales	Frers 40	12.35	Graham Mulligan	5:05:03:38
48	4	RQ1920	Charlie's Dream	Queensland	Holland-Cole-Lowe Bluewater 450	13.70	Peter Lewis	5:05:31:07
49	4	N3	Aurora	New South Wales	Farr 40 One Off	12.21	Jim Holley	5:06:47:22
50	4	407	Blunderbuss	Queensland	Farr Beneteau First 40.7	11.90	Tony Kinsman	5:09:29:32
51	3	SM5558	Young Ones	(Victoria (state)) Victoria	Young 11 Mod	11.00	Ian Miller	5:11:48:08
52	4	7407	Wave Sweeper	New South Wales	Farr Beneteau First 40.7	11.90	Morgan Rogers	5:13:42:37
53	3	SM381	Mille Sabords	(Victoria (state)) Victoria	Murray Burns Dovell Sydney 38	11.78	Stephane Howarth	5:14:07:36
DNF	3	5976	Alchemy III	Tasmania	Farr Beneteau 57	17.80	Jarrod Ritchie	Retired-Boom Damage
DNF	4	SM377	Bacardi	(Victoria (state)) Victoria	Peterson 44	13.34	Martin Power	Retired-Broken Mast
DNF	1	SM5252	Calm	(Victoria (state)) Victoria	Farr TP 52	15.85	Jason Van der Slot; John Williams; Graeme Ainley	Retired-Undisclosed Reasons
DNF	2	46	Exile	New South Wales	Mills DK46	14.10	Rob Reynolds	Retired-Steering Damage
DNF	2	S390	Jazz Player	(Victoria (state)) Victoria	Bakewell-White 39	11.92	Andrew Lawrence	Retired-Damaged Mainsail
DNF	3	A169	Nautical Circle	New South Wales	Nivelt Archambault 40	12.00	Matthew Prentice	Retired-Engine Problems
DNF	2	421	Pirelli Celestial	New South Wales	Rogers 46	14.00	Sam Haynes	Retired-Sail Damage
DNF	2	8975	Salona II	New South Wales	J&J Yachts Salona 44	11.29	Phillip King	Retired-Steering Problems
DNF	1	SM11	Scarlet Runner	(Victoria (state)) Victoria	Reichel Pugh 52	15.99	Robert Dale	Retired-Sail Damage
DNF	2	M330	Shamrock	(Victoria (state)) Victoria	Reichel Pugh 47	14.21	Tony Donnellan	Retired-Damage to Rudder Bearing
DNF	3	6338	Shining Sea	South Australia	Murray Burns Dovell Sydney 38	11.78	Andrew Corletto	Retired-Broken Rudder
DNF	3	6073	Swish	New South Wales	Murray Burns Dovell Sydney 38	11.78	Steven Proud	Retired-Radio Damage
DNF	3	YC400	Two True	South Australia	Farr Beneteau First 40	12.24	Andrew Saies	Retired-Engine Problems
DNF	1	6953	Wot Eva	New South Wales	Nelson Marek TP 52	15.85	David Pescud	Retired-Engine Problems
DNF	0	AUS11111	YuuZoo	New South Wales	Simonis Voogd Maxi	27.38	Ludde Ingvall	Retired-Torn Headsail
