= List of Australian television ratings for 1999 =

The following is a list of Australian television ratings for the year 1999.

== Network shares ==
Market	Network shares
Market	ABC	Seven	Nine	Ten	SBS
5 - Cities	14.7%	29.4%	32.8%	19.5%	3.7%
Sydney	15.0%	27.0%	33.7%	20.7%	3.7%
Melbourne	14.4%	29.0%	33.8%	19.1%	3.7%
Brisbane	15.4%	30.5%	32.6%	17.8%	3.7%
Adelaide	13.1%	31.6%	32.6%	19.3%	3.4%
Perth	15.2%	33.2%	28.0%	19.8%	3.9%

* Data Gathered by then Ratings Supplier: A.C Neilsen Australia

== Most Watched Broadcasts 1999 ==
Rank	Broadcast	Date	Network	Audience
1	Friends	31 May 1999	9	2,931,000
2	Cricket World Cup Final	20 June 1999	9	2,923,000
3	Friends	14 June 1999	9	2,873,000
4	Friends	24 May 1999	9	2,812,000
5	Friends	7 June 1999	9	2,766,000
6	Friends	21 June 1999	9	2,764,000
7	Friends	28 June 1999	9	2,740,000
8	Friends	8 February 1999	9	2,736,000
9	Hey Hey It's Saturday - Finale	20 November 1999	9	2,715,000
10	Friends	12 July 1999	9	2,695,000
11	Friends	2 August 1999	9	2,677,000
12	Friends	17 May 1999	9	2,637,000
13	Friends	5 July 1999	9	2,636,000
14	Friends	26 July 1999	9	2,578,000
15	Friends	22 February 1999	9	2,524,000
16	Pan-Pac Swimming - Day 5	26 August 1999	9	2,513,000
17	Friends	19 July 1999	9	2,483,000
18	Jesse	31 May 1999	9	2,472,000
19	Jesse	28 June 1999	9	2,471,000
20	Jesse	8 February 1999	9	2,464,000

== Top Rating Regular Programmes - 1999 ==
Rank	Programme	Network	Timeslot	Audience
1	Friends	9	Monday 7.30PM	2,586,000
2	Jesse	9	Monday 8.00PM	2,209,000
3	Walking with Dinosaurs	ABC	Sunday 7.30PM	2,085,000
4	SeaChange	ABC	Sunday 7.30PM	2,068,000
5	This Is Your Life	9	Thursday 8.30PM	1,980,000
6	Blue Heelers	7	Wednesday 8.30PM	1,978,000
7	National Nine News Sunday	9	Sunday 6.00PM	1,892,000
8	Better Homes and Gardens	7	Tuesday 7.30PM	1,839,000
9	RPA	9	Thursday 9.00PM	1,816,000
10	Money	9	Wednesday 8.00PM	1,805,000

== See also ==
- Television ratings in Australia
