= 2012 Sydney to Hobart Yacht Race =

2012 annual yacht race in Australia

68th Sydney to Hobart Yacht Race
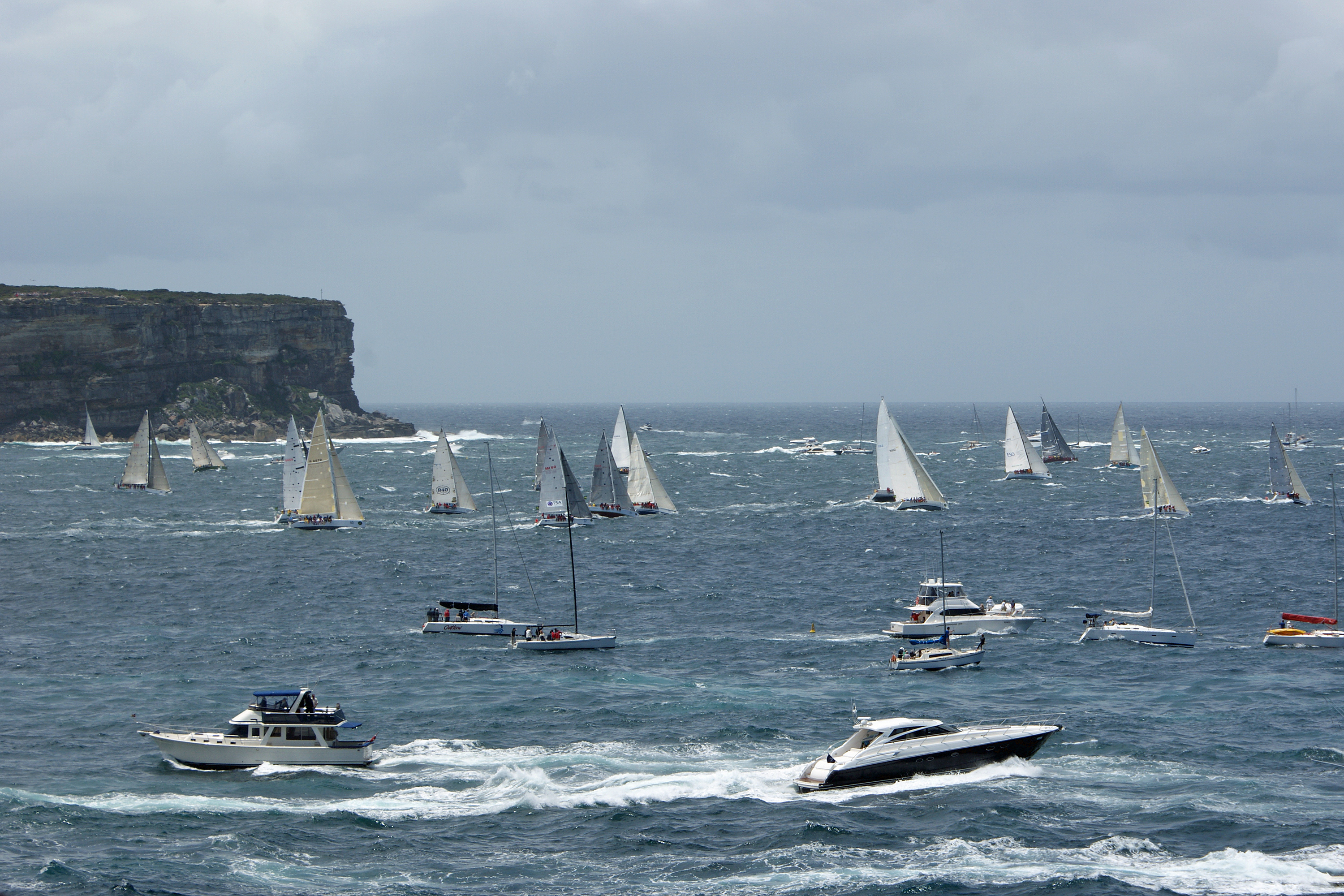
- Competing sailors leaving Sydney Harbour, North Head visible in the background

Event information
- Type: Yacht
- Dates: 26–31 December 2012
- Sponsor: Rolex
- Host city: Sydney, Hobart
- Boats: 76
- Distance: 628 nautical miles (1,163 km)
- Website: Website archive

Results
- Winner (2012): Wild Oats XI (Mark Richards)

Succession
- Previous: Investec LOYAL (Anthony Bell) in 2011
- Next: Wild Oats XI (Mark Richards) in 2013

The 2012 Sydney to Hobart Yacht Race, sponsored by Rolex and hosted by the Cruising Yacht Club of Australia in Sydney, New South Wales, was the 68th annual running of the "blue water classic" Sydney to Hobart Yacht Race. The 2012 race began on Sydney Harbour, at 1pm on Boxing Day (26 December 2012), before heading south for 628 nautical miles (1,163 km) through the Tasman Sea, past Bass Strait, into Storm Bay and up the River Derwent, to cross the finish line in Hobart, Tasmania.

76 competitors started the race and 71 finished. Line honors were claimed by Wild Oats XI, who broke their own race record, to finish in 1 day, 18 hours 23 minutes and 12 seconds. They defeated their nearest challenger, Ragamuffin Loyal, by around 5 hours.

== Results ==
=== Line Honours ===
Pos	Sail Number	Yacht	State/Country	Yacht Type	LOA (Metres)	Skipper	Elapsed time d:hh:mm:ss
1	10001	Wild Oats XI	New South Wales	Reichel Pugh 100	30.48	Mark Richards	1:18:23:12
2	SYD 100	Ragamuffin Loyal	New South Wales	Elliot 100 Maxi	30.48	Syd Fischer	1:23:08:44
3	10081	Lahana	New South Wales	Bakewell-White 30m Maxi	30.00	Peter Millard; John Honan	2:05:57:55
4	52566	Black Jack	Queensland	Reichel Pugh 66	20.12	Peter Harburg; Mark Bradford	2:06:42:53
5	AUS60000	Loki	New South Wales	Reichel Pugh 63	19.20	Stephen Ainsworth	2:07:53:23
6	AUS 03	Ichi Ban	New South Wales	Jones 70	21.50	Matt Allen	2:10:04:09
7	SM5252	Calm	(Victoria (state)) Victoria	Farr TP 52	15.85	Jason Van der Slot; Graeme Ainley; John Williams	2:17:06:20
8	5299	Jazz	New South Wales	Farr Cookson 50	15.20	Chris Bull	2:17:25:14
9	52002	Quest	New South Wales	Farr TP 52	15.85	Bob Steel	2:18:35:06
10	10000	Brindabella	New South Wales	Jutson 80	24.08	Jim Cooney	2:18:35:37
11	6952	Shogun	(Victoria (state)) Victoria	Judel Vroljik TP 52	15.85	Rob Hanna	2:19:26:07
12	YC3300	Holdens Secret Men's Business 3.5	South Australia	Reichel Pugh 51	15.64	Geoff Boettcher	2:20:02:26
13	LTU1000	Ambersail	Lithuania	Farr Volvo Ocean 60	19.44	Simonas Steponavicius	2:22:50:29
14	JPN4321	KLC Bengal 7	Japan	Humphreys 54	16.46	Yoshihiko Murase	2:22:56:35
15	NOR2	Southern Excellence	New South Wales	Davidson Volvo Ocean 60	19.44	Andrew Wenham	3:05:21:33
16	5200	Cougar II	Tasmania	Farr TP 52	15.85	Anthony Lyall	3:07:09:20
17	M111	Frantic	New South Wales	Donovan TP 52	15.85	Michael Martin	3:09:31:46
18	NZL8710	Akatea	New Zealand	Farr Cookson 50	15.20	Gary Lewis	3:09:33:15
19	421	Celestial-Assistance Dogs	New South Wales	Rogers 46	14.00	Sam Haynes	3:11:08:20
20	8679	Merit	Queensland	Farr Volvo Ocean 60	19.44	Leo Rodriguez; Bryan Bailie	3:12:33:57
21	SM602	Veloce	(Victoria (state)) Victoria	Elliott 44CR	13.70	Phil Simpfendorfer	3:15:14:50
22	8008	Occasional Coarse Language Too	New South Wales	Ker Sydney GTS 43	13.10	Warwick Sherman	3:15:31:20
23	8338	AFR Midnight Rambler	New South Wales	Ker 40	12.20	Bob Thomas; Ed Psaltis; Michael Bencsik	3:15:45:28
24	RQ64	Ocean Affinity	Queensland	Reichel Pugh Marten 49	15.00	Stewart Lewis	3:17:45:20
25	R33	Chutzpah	(Victoria (state)) Victoria	Reichel Pugh Caprice 40	12.35	Bruce Taylor	3:20:01:13
26	6953	Sailors with disAbilities	New South Wales	Nelson Marek TP 52	15.85	David Pescud	3:20:04:02
27	NZL8008	Rikki	New Zealand	Reichel Pugh 42	13.00	Ray Haslar	3:20:05:40
28	7771	Peugeot Surfrider	New South Wales	Briand Beneteau 45	13.68	Sebastien Guyot; Nicholas Lunven	3:20:15:48
29	ESP6100	Duende	New South Wales	Judel Vrolijk TP 52	15.39	Damien Parkes	3:22:09:53
30	B45	Rush	(Victoria (state)) Victoria	Farr 45	13.81	Ian & John Paterson	3:22:12:51
31	262	Helsal 3	Tasmania	Adams 20	20.00	Rob Fisher	3:22:28:52
32	6686	St Jude	New South Wales	Murray Burns Dovell Sydney 47	14.20	Noel Cornish	3:23:23:29
33	F108	Finistere	Western Australia	Davidson 50	15.40	Robert Thomas	3:23:36:21
34	RQ14	Lunchtime Legend	Queensland	Farr Beneteau First 40	12.24	Robert Robertson	3:23:43:41
35	360	Patrice Six	New South Wales	Jeppesen X41	12.50	Tony Kirby	3:23:46:18
36	9988	Brannew	New South Wales	Farr Beneteau First 40 CR	12.24	Chris Bran	4:00:02:54
37	SAM1	Tusitala	New South Wales	Dykstra Goss 60	18.50	Paul Goss	4:00:36:34
38	3838	Zen	New South Wales	Murray Burns Dovell Sydney 38	11.80	Gordon Ketelbey	4:00:56:22
39	SM4	Wicked	(Victoria (state)) Victoria	Farr Beneteau First 40	12.24	Mike Welsh	4:00:58:17
40	RQ4000	Blunderbuss	Queensland	Farr Beneteau First 40	12.24	Tony Kinsman	4:00:58:24
41	4343	Wild Rose	New South Wales	Farr 43	13.11	Roger Hickman	4:01:13:22
42	6841	Papillon	New South Wales	Joubert-Nivelt Archambault 40RC	12.00	Phil Molony	4:01:21:55
43	MH4	Toybox 2	New South Wales	Jeppesen X44	13.30	Ian Box	4:01:23:03
44	YC400	Two True	South Australia	Farr Beneteau First 40	12.24	Andrew Saies	4:01:24:16
45	A140	Ariel	New South Wales	Farr Beneteau First 40	12.24	Ron Forster	4:01:29:36
46	S20	Dekadence	(Victoria (state)) Victoria	Mills DK46	14.10	Ken Simpson	4:02:53:44
47	6834	Breakthrough	New South Wales	Farr Beneteau First 40	12.24	Jonathan Stone; Mathew Vadas	4:02:58:36
48	YC10	Asylum	South Australia	Murray Burns Dovell Sydney 38	11.80	Derek Morrison	4:02:58:53
49	5612	Abracadabra	New South Wales	Tripp 47	14.33	James Murchison	4:03:01:54
50	6689	Copernicus	New South Wales	Radford 12	11.99	Greg Zyner	4:03:08:41
51	M495	Geomatic	(Victoria (state)) Victoria	Judel Vrolijk Hanse 495	15.40	Adrian Lewis	4:03:52:47
52	6669	Carbon Credits	Queensland	Briand Beneteau First 45	13.67	Trevor Bailey	4:03:54:20
53	S390	Jazz Player	(Victoria (state)) Victoria	Bakewell-White 39	11.92	Andrew Lawrence	4:04:13:10
54	294	Love & War	New South Wales	Sparkman & Stephens S&S 47	14.21	Simon Kurts	4:04:15:26
55	7551	Flying Fish Arctos	New South Wales	Radford McIntyre 55	15.36	Duncan Macalister	4:04:17:40
56	1236	Local Hero	New South Wales	Murray Burns Dovell BH36	10.97	Peter Mosely; Grish Stromov	4:05:09:25
57	6146	Kioni	New South Wales	Farr Beneteau First 47.7	14.80	Nick Athineos	4:05:17:31
58	SA346	Enchantress	South Australia	Muirhead 11	11.00	John Willoughby	4:05:24:41
59	N3	Aurora	New South Wales	Farr 40 One Off	12.21	Jim Holley	4:06:02:12
60	7075	Martela	Tasmania	Jeppesen IMX 38	11.30	Anthony Williams	4:06:08:57
61	RF360	This Way Up	Western Australia	Murray Burns Dovell Sydney 36 CR	11.00	Bryan Thurstan; Hamish Maddern	4:06:14:59 ^{1}
62	8339	Luna Sea	New South Wales	Hick 35	10.50	James Cameron	4:07:11:58
63	4924	She	New South Wales	Mull Olsen 40	12.23	Peter Rodgers	4:07:52:58
64	R75	Halcyon	(Victoria (state)) Victoria	Farr Beneteau First 40	12.24	Chris Tucker	4:07:57:49
65	R6572	Icefire	New South Wales	Mummery 45	13.90	Alan Mather	4:08:40:06
66	SM5985	INSX	(Victoria (state)) Victoria	Jutson NSX 38	11.63	Robert Still	4:08:41:17
67	5356	Illusion	New South Wales	Davidson 34	10.30	Kim Jaggar; Travis Read	4:09:51:05
68	6590	Eressea	Queensland	Hanse 400	12.00	John Bankart	5:03:18:31
69	RQ1920	Charlie's Dream	Queensland	Holland Cole Lowe Bluewater 450	13.70	Peter Lewis	5:04:48:53
70	F111	CIC Technology Inca	Australian Capital Territory	Lavranos Vickers 41 MkII	12.50	Noel Sneddon	5:08:28:49
71	A19	Maluka of Kermandie	Tasmania	Gale Ranger 30	9.01	Sean Langman	5:08:40:12
DNF	7407	Corporate Initiatives	New South Wales	Farr Beneteau First 40.7	11.92	Morgan Rogers	Retired-Steering Problem
DNF	A6	Dump Truck	Tasmania	Ker 11.3	11.40	Justin Wells; Edward Fader	Retired-Rig Damage
DNF	R55	Living Doll	(Victoria (state)) Victoria	Farr 55	16.76	Michael Hiatt	Retired-Broken Rudder
DNF	S777	Primitive Cool	(Victoria (state)) Victoria	Farr 40 Mod	12.40	John Newbold	Retired-Damaged Main
DNF	MH60	TSA Management	New South Wales	Murray Burns Dovell Sydney 38	11.80	Tony Levett	Retired-Broken Rudder

Notes

^1 – This Way Up were given a 45 minutes penalty to be added onto their elapsed time by the International Jury due to failing to maintain a continuous listening watch on the race radio frequencies for the duration of their race as required by Sailing Instruction 40.7 (Radio Transmissions).

=== Overall Handicap ===
Pos	Division Number	Sail Number	Yacht	State/Country	Yacht Type	LOA (Metres)	Skipper	Elapsed time d:hh:mm:ss
1	0	10001	Wild Oats XI	New South Wales	Reichel Pugh 100	30.48	Mark Richards	3:10:26:31
2	1	AUS60000	Loki	New South Wales	Reichel Pugh 63	19.20	Stephen Ainsworth	3:12:43:44
3	0	52566	Black Jack	Queensland	Reichel Pugh 66	20.12	Peter Harburg; Mark Bradford	3:14:46:39
4	0	5299	Jazz	New South Wales	Farr Cookson 50	15.20	Chris Bull	3:16:19:04
5	1	SM5252	Calm	(Victoria (state)) Victoria	Farr TP 52	15.85	Jason Van der Slot	3:16:40:26
6	0	SYD 100	Ragamuffin Loyal	New South Wales	Elliot 100 Maxi	30.48	Syd Fischer	3:17:51:34
7	1	52002	Quest	New South Wales	Farr TP 52	15.85	Bob Steel	3:18:09:22
8	0	10081	Lahana	New South Wales	Bakewell-White 30m Maxi	30.00	Peter Millard; John Honan	3:18:49:25
9	1	6952	Shogun	(Victoria (state)) Victoria	Judel Vroljik JV52	15.85	Rob Hanna	3:19:42:43
10	1	YC3300	Holdens Secret Men's Business 3.5	South Australia	Reichel Pugh 51	15.64	Geoff Boettcher	3:20:07:37
11	0	AUS 03	Ichi Ban	New South Wales	Jones 70	21.50	Matt Allen	3:20:40:42
12	1	JPN4321	KLC Bengal 7	Japan	Humphreys 54	16.46	Yoshihiko Murase	4:02:19:37
13	4	4343	Wild Rose	New South Wales	Farr 43	13.11	Roger Hickman	4:05:00:42
14	0	LTU1000	Ambersail	Lithuania	Farr Volvo Ocean 60	19.44	Simonas Steponavicius	4:05:01:11
15	4	294	Love & War	New South Wales	Sparkman & Stephens S&S 47	14.21	Simon Kurts	4:05:57:42
16	2	8008	Occasional Coarse Language Too	New South Wales	Ker Sydney GTS 43	13.10	Warwick Sherman	4:07:27:05
17	3	RQ14	Lunchtime Legend	Queensland	Farr Beneteau First 40	12.24	Robert Robertson	4:07:28:55
18	3	9988	Brannew	New South Wales	Farr Beneteau First 40 CR	12.24	Chris Bran	4:07:49:42
19	4	SA346	Enchantress	South Australia	Muirhead 11	11.00	John Willoughby	4:08:02:53
20	2	8338	AFR Midnight Rambler	New South Wales	Ker 40	12.20	Bob Thomas; Ed Psaltis; Michael Bencsik	4:08:25:54
21	3	7771	Peugeot Surfrider	New South Wales	Briand Beneteau 45	13.68	Sebastien Guyot; Nicholas Lunven	4:08:26:32
22	2	421	Celestial-Assistance Dogs	New South Wales	Rogers 46	14.00	Sam Haynes	4:08:40:19
23	4	5356	Illusion	New South Wales	Davidson 34	10.30	Kim Jaggar; Travis Read	4:08:53:55
24	3	YC400	Two True	South Australia	Farr Beneteau First 40	12.24	Andrew Saies	4:08:54:17
25	3	SM4	Wicked	(Victoria (state)) Victoria	Farr Beneteau First 40	12.24	Mike Welsh	4:08:55:23
26	4	8339	Luna Sea	New South Wales	Hick 35	10.50	James Cameron	4:09:03:25
27	3	RQ4000	Blunderbuss	Queensland	Farr Beneteau First 40	12.24	Tony Kinsman	4:09:18:47
28	3	A140	Ariel	New South Wales	Farr Beneteau First 40	12.24	Ron Forster	4:09:52:40
29	3	6834	Breakthrough	New South Wales	Farr Beneteau First 40	12.24	Jonathan Stone; Mathew Vadas	4:10:18:03
30	4	N3	Aurora	New South Wales	Farr 40 One Off	12.21	Jim Holley	4:10:19:20
31	3	6841	Papillon	New South Wales	Joubert-Nivelt Archambault 40RC	12.00	Phil Molony	4:10:19:22
32	3	360	Patrice Six	New South Wales	Jeppesen X41	12.50	Tony Kirby	4:10:29:53
33	1	5200	Cougar II	Tasmania	Farr TP 52	15.85	Anthony Lyall	4:10:32:36
34	4	7075	Martela	Tasmania	Jeppesen IMX 38	11.30	Anthony Williams	4:10:38:37
35	3	3838	Zen	New South Wales	Murray Burns Dovell Sydney 38	11.80	Gordon Ketelbey	4:10:49:38
36	2	SM602	Veloce	(Victoria (state)) Victoria	Elliott 44CR	13.70	Phil Simpfendorfer	4:11:13:37
37	4	RF360	This Way Up	Western Australia	Murray Burns Dovell Sydney 36 CR	11.00	Bryan Thurstan; Hamish Maddern	4:12:04:40
38	1	NZL8710	Akatea	New Zealand	Farr Cookson 50	15.20	Gary Lewis	4:12:13:21
39	3	YC10	Asylum	South Australia	Murray Burns Dovell Sydney 38	11.80	Derek Morrison	4:12:58:43
40	4	SM5985	INSX	(Victoria (state)) Victoria	Jutson NSX 38	11.63	Robert Still	4:12:58:49
41	1	M111	Frantic	New South Wales	Donovan TP 52	15.85	Michael Martin	4:13:44:19
42	2	R33	Chutzpah	(Victoria (state)) Victoria	Reichel Pugh Caprice 40	12.35	Bruce Taylor	4:14:14:25
43	2	MH4	Toybox 2	New South Wales	Jeppesen X44	13.30	Ian Box	4:15:12:47
44	3	6669	Carbon Credits	Queensland	Briand Beneteau First 45	13.67	Trevor Bailey	4:15:41:40
45	2	RQ64	Ocean Affinity	Queensland	Reichel Pugh Marten 49	15.00	Stewart Lewis	4:16:06:17
46	2	6686	St Jude	New South Wales	Murray Burns Dovell Sydney 47	14.20	Noel Cornish	4:16:10:49
47	3	R75	Halcyon	(Victoria (state)) Victoria	Farr Beneteau First 40	12.24	Chris Tucker	4:16:41:48
48	2	NZL8008	Rikki	New Zealand	Reichel Pugh 42	13.00	Ray Haslar	4:18:06:18
49	2	B45	Rush	(Victoria (state)) Victoria	Farr 45	13.81	Ian & John Paterson	4:19:02:08
50	2	F108	Finistere	Western Australia	Davidson 50	15.40	Robert Thomas	4:19:29:31
51	2	S390	Jazz Player	(Victoria (state)) Victoria	Bakewell-White 39	11.92	Andrew Lawrence	4:19:51:13
52	4	A19	Maluka of Kermandie	Tasmania	Gale Ranger 30	9.01	Sean Langman	4:19:55:54
53	2	S20	Dekadence	(Victoria (state)) Victoria	Mills DK46	14.10	Ken Simpson	4:21:11:28
54	1	ESP6100	Duende	New South Wales	Judel Vrolijk TP 52	15.39	Damien Parkes	5:02:19:12
DNF	4	7407	Corporate Initiatives	New South Wales	Farr Beneteau First 40.7	11.92	Morgan Rogers	Retired-Steering Problem
DNF	2	A6	Dump Truck	Tasmania	Ker 11.3	11.40	Justin Wells; Edward Fader	Retired-Rig Damage
DNF	1	R55	Living Doll	(Victoria (state)) Victoria	Farr 55	16.76	Michael Hiatt	Retired-Broken Rudder
DNF	3	S777	Primitive Cool	(Victoria (state)) Victoria	Farr 40 Mod	12.40	John Newbold	Retired-Damaged Main
DNF	3	MH60	TSA Management	New South Wales	Murray Burns Dovell Sydney 38	11.80	Tony Levett	Retired-Broken Rudder
