= Ragamuffin 100 =

100-foot maxi yacht

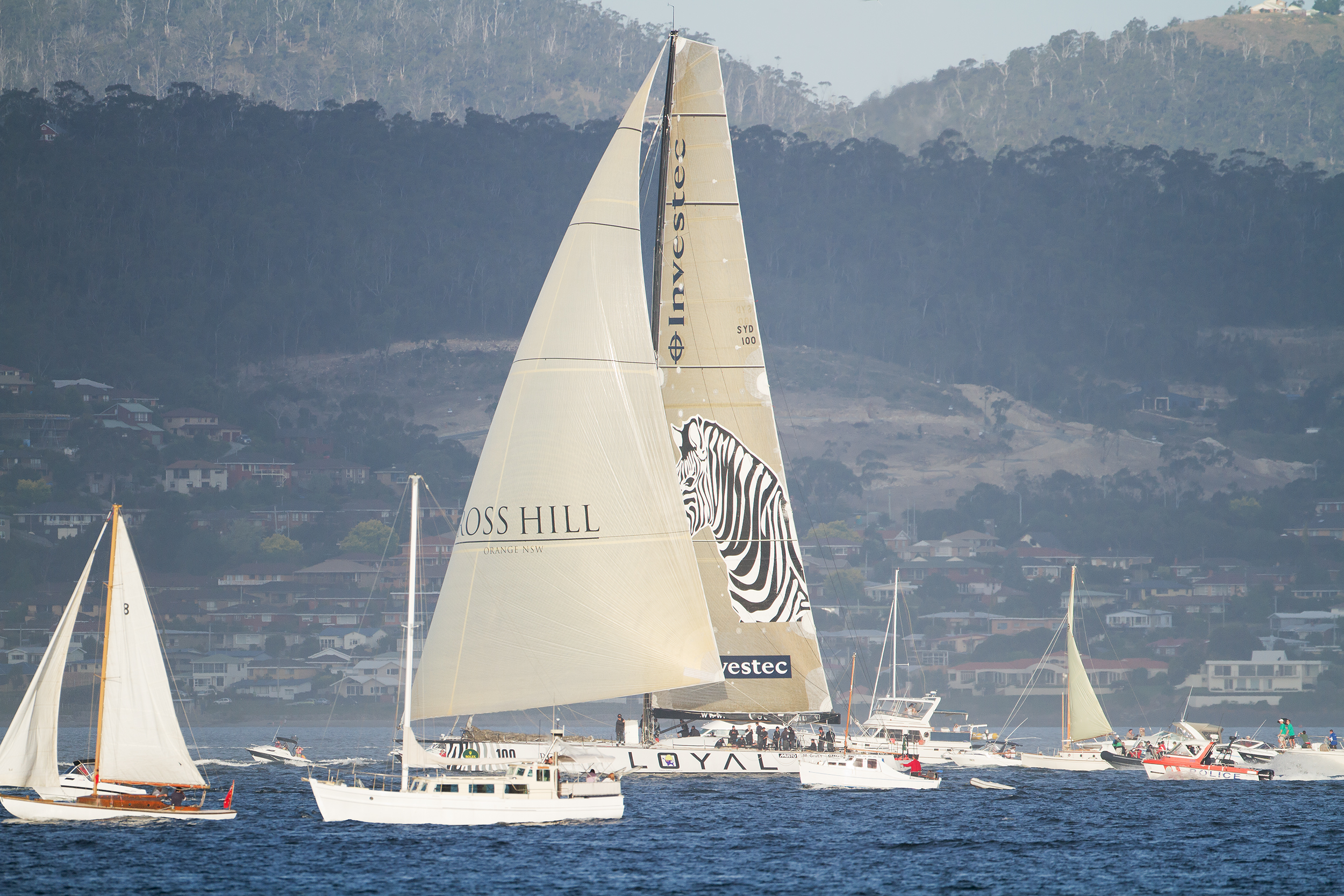
- Investec LOYAL in 2011 Sydney to Hobart Yacht Race.
- Other names: Maximus; Investec LOYAL; Ragamuffin 100; Scallywag
- Designer(s): Greg Elliott & Clay Oliver
- Builder: TP Cookson, Auckland, New Zealand
- Launched: 2005
- Owner(s): Seng Huang Lee

Specifications
- Length: 30.48 m (100.0 ft)

Ragamuffin 100 (formerly Loyal, Maximus) is a 100 ft maxi yacht which was built by TP Cookson for Charles St. Clair Brown; The boat was designed by Greg Elliott and Clay Oliver and launched in Auckland in February 2005.

Her carbonfiber design has a very high power-to-weight ratio, she is rigged with a carbonfiber rotating mast and has a canting keel. Due to the unprecedented performance of the boat when built, the design includes several safety features including crash bars and a high deck sides to reduce high-speed deck wash. She can function without any auxiliary power.

== Career ==
=== Maximus ===
Maximus won the Grand Prix division top prize on the Rolex Transatalatic Challenge after a dramatic battle against Mari-Cha IV another Greg Elliott designed racing yacht. While Mari-Cha IV took line honours, Maximus made it an exceptionally close race, especially considering it is 40 ft shorter than Mari-Cha IV.

After the Transatlantic crossing Maximus stayed for the 2005 summer sailing season in the UK during which she was sponsored by ICAP. She won line honours in the Fastnet Race with a time of 68 hours 2 minutes 7 seconds, though Iromiguy won on corrected time. Despite the very calm conditions, her tall rotating rigging allowed higher wind speeds some distance above the water's surface to be accessible, giving her an advantage over rivals.

ICAP sponsored Maximus again for the 2006 season.

=== Investec LOYAL ===
Maximus was put up for sale in 2006 for $6,152,355. She was acquired by accountant Anthony Bell and renamed Investec LOYAL. In a performance described as "off the pace" by Bell, she finished fourth in the 2009 Sydney to Hobart Race. However, she came second to Wild Oats XI in 2010. She underwent modifications by designer Greg Elliott and then went on to beat Wild Oats XI to claim line honours in the 2011 Sydney to Hobart in a very close race.

=== Ragamuffin Loyal ===
The boat was purchased in 2012 by veteran skipper Syd Fischer to become the latest version of Fischer's Ragamuffin named yachts. Ragamuffin Loyal finished second in line honors to Wild Oats XI in the 2012 Sydney to Hobart. In 2013 she was renamed Ragamuffin 100.

=== Ragamuffin 100 ===
Ragamuffin 100 finished third in the 2013 Sydney to Hobart behind Wild Oats XI and Perpetual Loyal. After the race, Ragamuffin 100 underwent a major refit, the deck was cut off the hull, and a new hull with a wider chined stern section among other changes was put in its place. The yacht finished third in the 2014 Sydney to Hobart behind Wild Oats XI and Jim Clark's Comanche. Perpetual Loyal was forced to retire after sustaining hull damage. In the 2015 Sydney-Hobart she again finished second across the line, some 11 hours behind Comanche. All three of the lead boats suffered some damage.

=== Scallywag ===
Ragamuffin 100 was then bought by Seng Huang Lee in 2016 and renamed her Scallywag.
