= Money (Australian TV program) =

Money is an Australian factual television program that was broadcast on the Nine Network as a regular weekly series from 1993 to 2002. It also appeared as occasional specials from 2002 to 2006. Money was a financial and investment program, hosted by Paul Clitheroe.

The series spawned a successful magazine called Money, which is still published today.

== See also ==
- List of Australian television series
- List of Nine Network programs
