= Cavalier Yachts =

Yacht manufacturer in New Zealand

Cavalier Yachts was a yacht manufacturer in New Zealand, with production in New Zealand and designs also licensed to Australia and Japan. In the 1970s Cavalier was the largest production boat builder in the Southern Hemisphere.

== History ==
Cavalier Yachts was created as a partnership between Peter K. Smith and John Salthouse, trading as Salthouse Custom Glass Boats Ltd, later renamed to Custom Glass Boats Ltd. The company initially produced the successful Cavalier 32 as well as the Coronet Trailer Sailer and the Corsair 36 launch.

Salthouse and Smith amicably parted company, with Smith taking control of the Cavalier Yachts half of the business. Smith introduced two new partners, Pat Sullivan as administrator and accountant, and Grant Bennet as floor and production manager.

At its peak, Cavalier Yachts had eleven designs in simultaneous production, and was the largest production boat builder in Australasia. Under pressure from the New Zealand government, a sophisticated fibreglass production unit was developed in Glenfield, Auckland, to meet the new health and safety regulations for fiberglass construction.

In 1979, Prime Minister Rob Muldoon introduced a sudden 20% sales tax surcharge to the New Zealand boat-building industry which priced Cavalier out of the international market, leading to cancelled orders and precipitating the collapse of the business.

A receiver was appointed and successfully traded the company out, repaying all of its debts. The business was then purchased by Jim Lawry, who formed Export Yachts Ltd, believing that export was the future for the company, and a number of Cavalier 39s were sent to Australia and the United States.

== Models ==
Cavalier Yachts was one of the New Zealand boat-building industry's early successes, the largest in the southern hemisphere at the time. 170 Cavalier 32s were built, and 84 Cavalier 39s.

The Cavalier 32 enjoyed great success in Half Ton racing throughout the 70's. Peter Smith's own Conquero won the 200 mile South Pacific Half Ton Trophy ocean race, the Leo Bouzaid Memorial 120 mile offshore race in 1974, and sister-ship Petticoats took out the 97 mile offshore race.

The entire range consisted of:

- Cavalier 26
- Cavalier 28
- Cavalier 30 with open transom
- Cavalier 32
- Cavalier 36
- Cavalier 39
