= Rodd & Gunn =

New Zealand manufacturer of clothing footwear and accessories (1946)

- Industry: Retail
- Founded: 1946
- Headquarters: Auckland, New Zealand
- Number of locations: 240+
- Website: Official website

Rodd & Gunn is a New Zealand brand of clothing, footwear, and accessories founded in 1946. The brand has been acquired by the Australian firm Action Downunder.

== History ==
The firm outfitted the New Zealand national team participating in the 2012 London Summer Olympics.

In 2024, the company began a five-year expansion plan to open 40 new stores in the UK. As of December, Rodd & Gunn operates over 240 retail stores around the world, including in New Zealand, Australia, United States, and the United Kingdom. They also operate outlet locations in New Zealand, Australia and the United States. They are also stocked in Canada, Ireland and France. That year, the company leased space to open its third New York City store, on 5th Avenue.

In 2025, Rodd & Gunn expanded its cross-border online payment capabilities with the arrival of Airwallex to New Zealand.
