= Wild Oats XI =

Australian maxi yacht

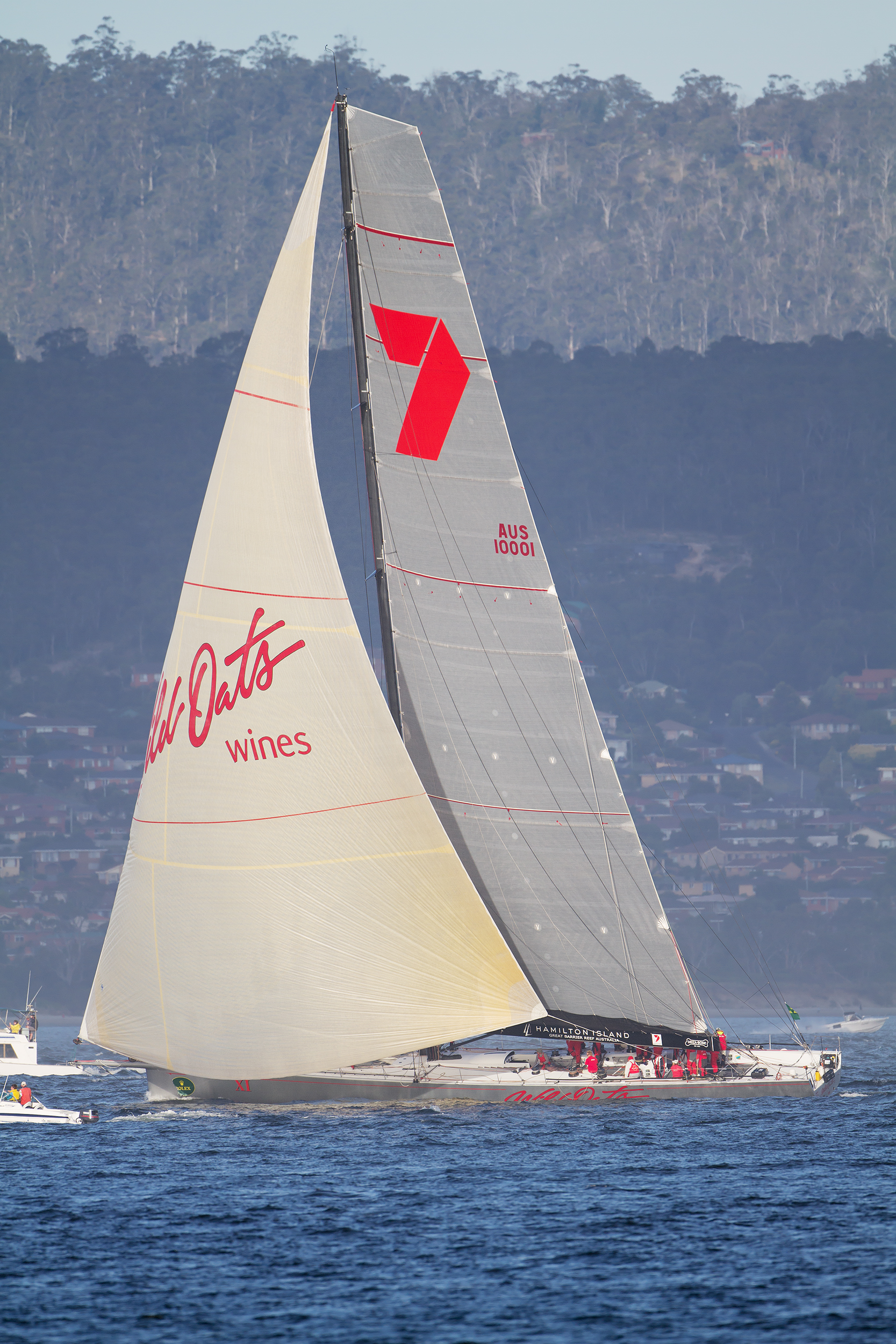
- Wild Oats XI at the finishing line, 2011 Sydney-Hobart
- Yacht club: Royal Prince Alfred Yacht Club; Yacht Club Costa Smeralda; Hamilton Island Yacht Club
- Nation: Australia
- Class: canting keel IRC supermaxi
- Sail no: AUS–10001
- Designer(s): Reichel/Pugh
- Builder: McConaghy; Sydney, Australia
- Launched: 2 December 2005
- Owner(s): Robert Oatley

Racing career
- Skippers: Mark Richards
- Notable victories: 2005–2014, 2018 (nine) Sydney-Hobart; 2010 Pittwater-Coffs; 2015 Transpac

Specifications
- Type: Monohull
- Displacement: 32T, of which 14T ballast
- Length: 30.48 m (100.00 ft)
- Beam: 5.1 m (16.73 ft)
- Draft: 5.91 m (19.39 ft)
- Sail area: mainsail 382 m^{2} (4,112 ft^{2}) jib 228 m^{2} (2,454 ft^{2}) genoa 535 m^{2} (5,759 ft^{2}) spinnaker 880 m^{2} (9,472 ft^{2})
- Crew: 16–29 crew

Wild Oats XI is a maxi yacht, most famous for being the former race record holder and a nine-times line honours winner of the Sydney to Hobart Yacht Race. Launched in 2005, she was owned by Bob Oatley (Oatley's estate since his death in 2016) and skippered by New South Wales Mark Richards, who founded Palm Beach Motor Yachts Australia.

== Design and construction ==
Wild Oats XI is a state-of-the-art maxi yacht designed by Reichel/Pugh and built by Mcconaghy Boats, five months after her near-sistership Alfa Romeo II, from which she borrowed extensively. She was launched in December 2005 after a 9-month build and won her first Sydney-Hobart the same month. She is distinctively narrow with a 5.1 m (17 ft) beam and originally featured "canting ballast twin foil" appendages enabling her to carry a large sail plan without compromising stability. She has undergone many modifications over time to keep her competitive: In 2009 she was lengthened at bow and stern from 98 ft to 100 ft to meet the new limit in the Sydney-Hobart. In 2011 her forward balanced spade canard was removed and twin daggerboards were added amidships. In 2012 she received a bow centreboard as well as caudal fin winglets on her torpedo bulb. In 2013 she was equipped with a Dynamic Stability System (DSS) foil, which is a retractable horizontal foil deployed on the leeward side of the boat. In 2015 her stern was shortened by 2m and her 12m forward sections were replaced by a 14m longer, sleeker bow, keeping her midship sections unmodified and in effect moving her entire existing sailplan aft by 2m. All mechanical systems onboard Wild Oats XI are powered by a continually running Diesel generator, excluding manual backup systems, making the boat entirely dependent on the auxiliary. This limits the boat's autonomy as it cannot be sailed once the fuel is exhausted but this enables significant grinding crew weight savings.

== Sydney to Hobart Yacht Race ==
In her first season Wild Oats XI won the "treble" in the 2005 Sydney to Hobart Yacht Race, winning on elapsed (line honours) and corrected time (handicap) as well as setting a new race record. In the 2007 race, Wild Oats XI equalled the 59-year-old record of Morna, by taking line honours in the race three times in a row. In the 2008 Sydney to Hobart Yacht Race, Wild Oats XI broke the record, winning an unprecedented fourth consecutive line honours. Wild Oats XI won the Sydney Hobart "treble" again in 2012, setting a new record of 1 day 18 hours 23 minutes 12 seconds. Wild Oats XI made her Sydney to Hobart debut in 2005, and made an immediate impact on the race. Racing out of the Heads, she arrived in record time, breaking the 1999 race record set by the Volvo Ocean 60 Nokia. Wild Oats XI won on elapsed time, won on corrected time, and set a new record, becoming the only boat since the inaugural race of 1945 to do all three feats.

The following year, 2006, Wild Oats XI was equally dominant, taking line honours in 2 days, 8 hours, 52 minutes and 33 seconds. Arriving at 9:52 pm, the yacht sailed into Sullivans Cove to rapturous applause by a large crowd gathered on the docks, who were appreciative of her achieving her 'double' despite being battered in heavy seas.

The 2007 Sydney to Hobart Yacht Race saw Wild Oats XI equal the 59-year-old record of Morna, by winning a hat-trick of line honours titles. Wild Oats XI lined up for the start of the 2008 Sydney to Hobart Yacht Race aiming to make history, and set a new record in her own right by becoming the only yacht to win four consecutive line honours titles, and did so, leading for the duration and completing the race in 1 day, 20 hours, 34 minutes 14 seconds. The 2008 race was not without difficulty for the crew though, as they picked up debris in Sydney Harbour which added excess drag, and also collided with a two-metre (6.5 foot) shark. The crew felt that the collision may have actually assisted them by dislodging the snag from their hull.

The time set by Wild Oats XI in 2005 of 1 day, 18 hours, 40 minutes and 10 seconds, remained the race record until 2012 when it was bettered by 16 minutes.

Wild Oats XI won line honours for the fifth time in the 2010 race, although the yacht's crew faced a protest against their win which could have resulted in disqualification. Under sailing instruction 44.1(A), yachts are required to report their position by radio as they pass Green Cape, the entrance to Bass Strait. The rule was created following the disastrous 1998 race in which five boats sank and six sailors died. As the yacht passed the cape, the crew realised that a blown fuse had rendered their high-frequency radio non-functional. They reported their position to race organisers via satellite phone, but race officials forwarded a complaint to an international jury, alleging that the crew had violated what race committee chairman Tim Cox called "one of the fundamental safety rules of the Sydney to Hobart yacht race". The complaint was dismissed by the jury, and Wild Oats XI was awarded its fifth Sydney to Hobart line honours.

In the 2011 race Wild Oats came second to Investec Loyal in a time of 2 days, 6 hours, 17 minutes and 26 seconds. They finished 2 minutes and 48 seconds behind.

The 2012 Sydney to Hobart Yacht Race saw the super maxi once again take line honours. The race time of one day, 18 hours and 23 minutes and 12 seconds broke the yacht's own race record by 16 minutes and 58 seconds. She also completed the "treble" for the second time, winning on elapsed time, winning on corrected time and breaking the race record. She is the only boat to have achieved this feat since the inaugural race of 1945.

In the 2015 edition of the race, Wild Oats was damaged and limped back to Sydney. In 2016, Wild Oats was forced to abandon the race. In 2017, Wild Oats XI finished the race in the shortest time period; however, the international jury subsequently held that she had fouled Comanche breaking Rules 10 and 13. A one-hour penalty was applied in lieu of disqualification, giving Comanche Line honours.

The 2018 Sydney to Hobart race was described as "redemption" by Skipper Mark Richards, after they won line honours for the first time since 2014 with a time of 1 day, 19 hours, 7 minutes and 21 seconds. The 2018 race was possibly one of the closest between the Supermaxis. After arguably the best start of the maxis, Wild Oats led the fleet until essentially coming to a stop just short of the first buoy, allowing Black Jack to slip past. Wild Oats recovered quickly enough to keep beside Christian Beck's Infotrack and overtake her to windward. Black Jack led the fleet out of the heads followed by Wild Oats, Infotrack, Scallywag and the Carkeek 60 Winnings Appliances before Comanche struggled out of the heads.

Heading out furthest to the East, Wild Oats had a short lived advantage, overtaking then race leader Comanche early on the morning of Day 2. This was soon to be reversed when she was later overtaken by Comanche, Black Jack and for a short period, Infotrack. However, things swayed to Wild Oats' advantage on the morning of Day 3, when she overtook Comanche and Black Jack rounding Port Arthur, and led for the rest of the race, taking out a several-mile lead.

Despite this redemption, Black Jack's owner, Peter Harburg, suggested that Wild Oats had violated race rules when their Automatic Identification System (AIS) was allegedly turned off to prevent other boats identifying her location. While Black Jack and Comanche, race record holder and previous line honours holder, made no formal protest, the Race Committee of the Sydney to Hobart Yacht Race protested Wild Oats for the violation of racing rules. This was despite criticism of Comanche skipper and owner, Jim Cooney, who said that he didn't "think anyone should rely on it as a tactical tool" and that it "made no difference to us at all".

The International Jury found that:

The Race Committee’s investigation and subsequent protest arose from the report from the owner of Black Jack, a competitor in the Race and therefore a person with a conflict of interest within the meaning of the Racing Rules of Sailing (RRS).

The Race Committee’s investigation was prudent, however in these circumstances, for the protest to be valid under the Racing Rules of Sailing, a competitor with information about a potential rule breach must lodge the protest.

Rules that apply: RRS60.2 (a), Definitions – Conflict of Interest.

Decision: Protest Invalid.

This meant that Wild Oats was able to retain their record-breaking 9 line honours victories.

On October 24, 2025, it was revealed Wild Oats XI had been sold by the Oatley family to longtime skipper Mark Richards and Palm Beach Motor Yachts. It will contest the 2025 Sydney Hobart under the new name Palm Beach XI.
