= Paul Clitheroe =

Australian television presenter

- Born: 7 July 1955 (age 71); Nottingham, England, UK
- Education: UNSW Sydney
- Occupations: Financial analyst; financial advisor; television presenter; radio presenter; author
- Known for: Presenter on television program Money; Financial publications
- Title: Partner ipac securities

Paul Hugh Clitheroe AM (born 7 July 1955) is an English-born Australian financial analyst and advisor; he is well known as a television and radio presenter and author, offering his expertise and advice as a financier.

== Biography and career ==
Clitheroe was born in Nottingham, England on 7 July 1955 and graduated from the University of NSW in the late 1970s, with a Bachelor of Arts.

With financing from his father for his share of a new business venture, Clitheroe and some university friends founded investment research and advisory company, "Ipac Securities Limited", in 1983.

He is best known for his stint as the host of Nine Network show Money, a financial and investment program that aired from 1993 to 2002, and has also appeared as occasional specials, the latest in 2006.

Clitheroe occasionally appeared on Tony Delroy's Nightlife on ABC radio and also on Thursdays on 2UE Money Clinic.

In addition to this, Clitheroe has written for numerous financial publications as well as in Melbourne newspaper the Herald Sun. He was president of the Financial Planning Association of Australia for 1993–94.

Clitheroe has been an active advocate of financial literacy for many years. He is chairman of the Australian Government Financial Literacy Board and Financial Literacy Australia. Clitheroe is the chairman of InvestSMART Group Limited, and is also chairman and chief commentator of Money magazine.

== Books ==
- Financial Snakes and Ladders: How to Survive and Thrive in Tough Times (2001). ISBN 0-670-04067-3
- Making Money: The Keys to Financial Success (2009). ISBN 978-0-670-07291-0

and more
