= Syd Fischer =

Australian businessman (1927–2023)

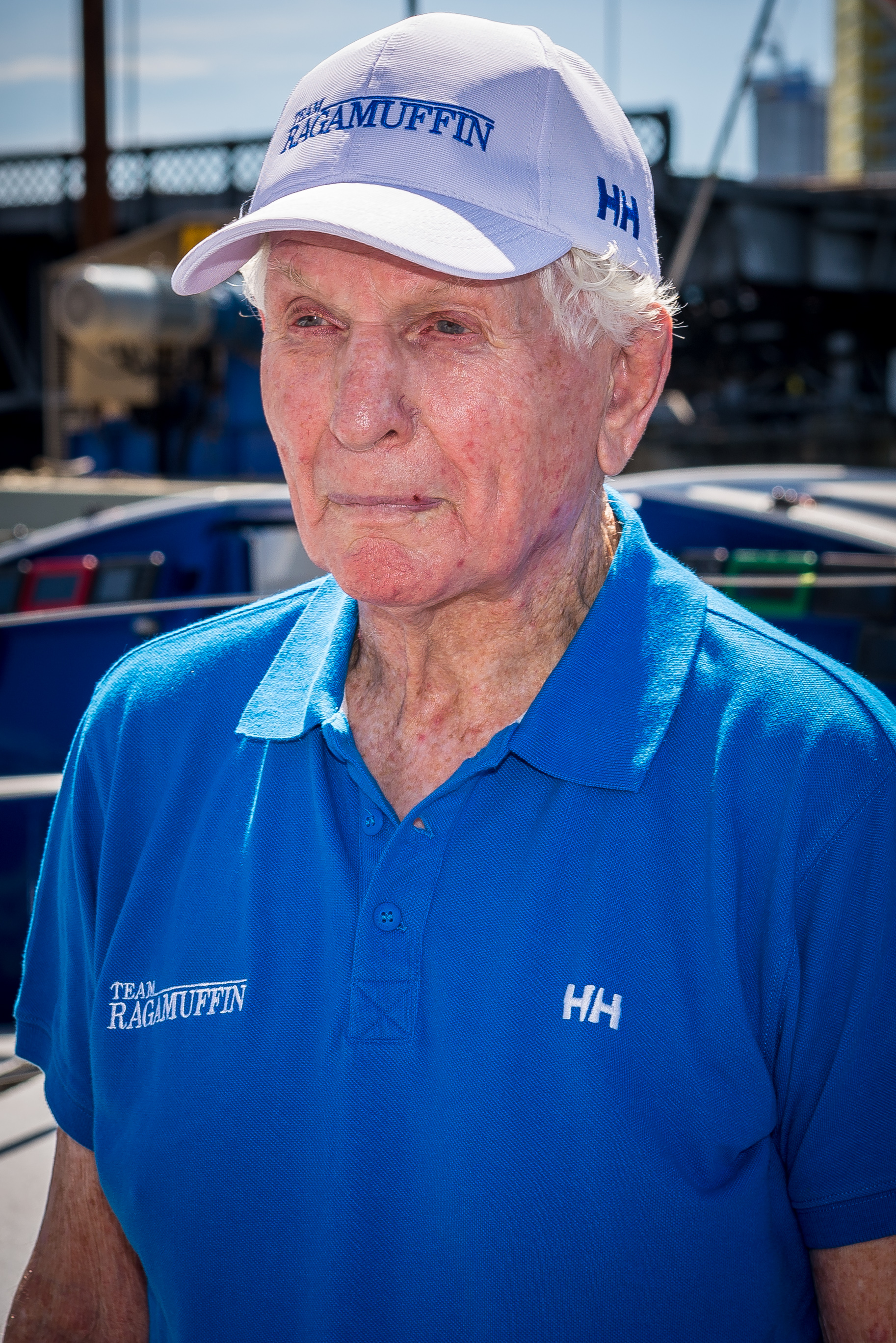
Fischer in 2014

Sydney Fischer AM OBE (4 March 1927 – 23 February 2023) was an Australian businessman, property developer and sailor. He was also a rugby league player with Manly Warringah.

Most noted for his sailing, Fischer was described as Australia's most successful offshore sailor. He skippered numerous yachts, notably several named Ragamuffin and competed in six Admiral's Cup teams representing his country.

Fischer's wins included:

- World Championship One Ton Cup in Stormy Petrel in New Zealand in 1971
- 1971 Fastnet Race in Ragamuffin
- Line honours in the 1988 and 1990 Sydney to Hobart Yacht Race
- Handicap honours in 1992 Sydney to Hobart Yacht Race
- 1980 Round State Race in Hawaii

Fischer shares a record of five challenges for the America's Cup, with Sir Thomas Lipton. He first challenged for the 1983 America's Cup in Advance, the year Australia II won. He led subsequent challenges in 1987 in Steak 'n' Kidney, and 1992 in Challenge Australia. He made his third and fourth attempts at San Diego in 1992 and 1995 and his fifth in Auckland in 2000.

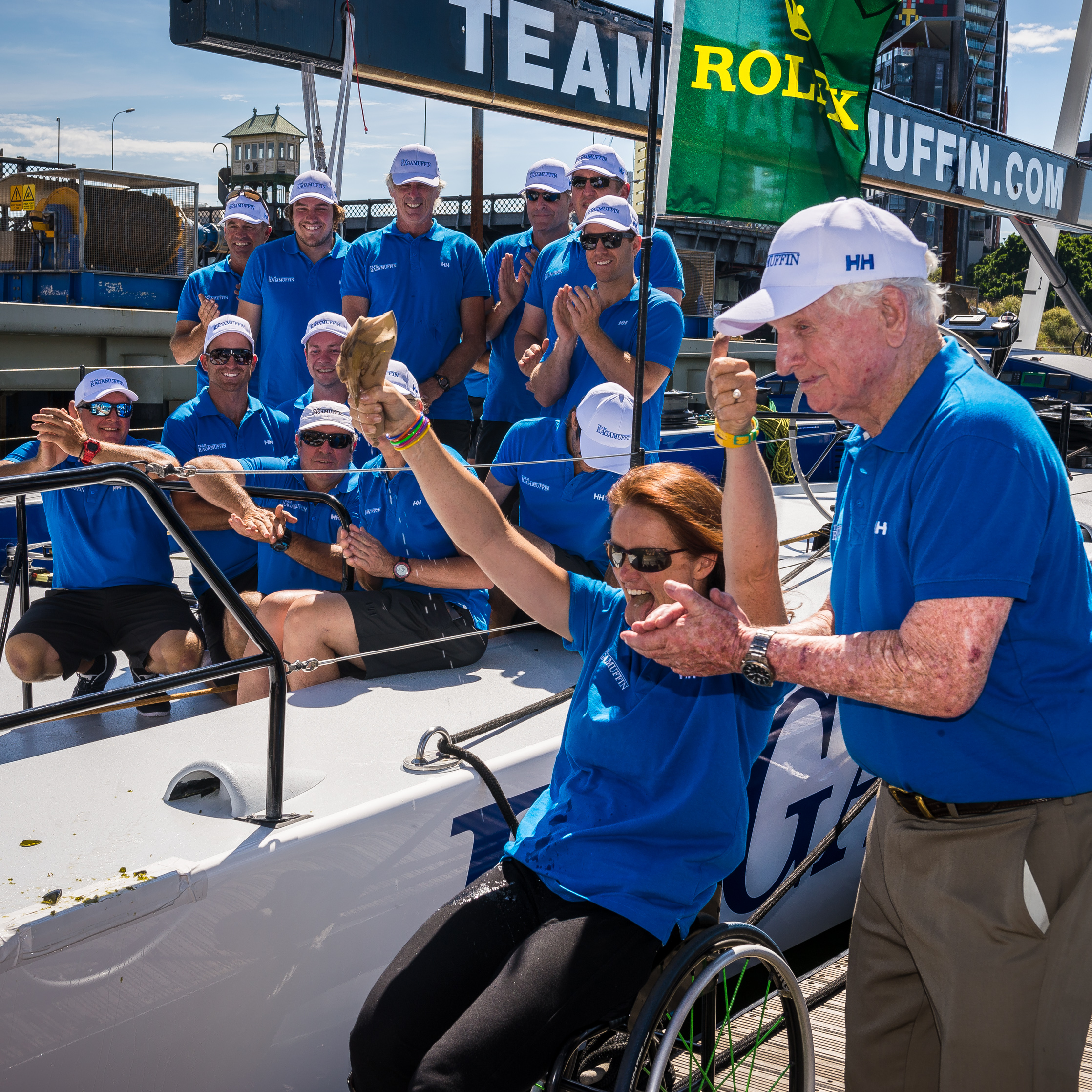
Syd Fischer and Liesl Tesch christen Ragamuffin 100 in 2014

In 1996 and 1998 he captained Australia's Kenwood Cup team.

Yachting Achievements • OBE for Sporting Achievements in 1971 • NSW Sports Hall of Fame 2001 • Australian Yachtsman of the year 1971/72 and 1992/93 • Ocean Racer of the Year 1993, 1996 and 2002 • Award for Services to Yachting 2003/03

Major Ocean Racing Victories • Winner − World Championship One Ton Cup 1971 • Winner − Fastnet Race, England 1971 • Winner − Line Honours in Sydney-Hobart races 1988 and 1990 • Winner − Sydney-Hobart 1992 on handicap IOR division • Winner − Round State Race Hawaii 1980

Achievements • Captain of Australian Admiral's Cup in 1971, 1973, 1977, 1979, 1981, 1993, 1997 including the winning team in 1979 and competed in 1969 team • Captain of Australian Clipper cup Winning Team – Hawaii 1978 and 1980 • Winner − Top Point Score Trophy in Clipper Cup 1980 • Captain of Australian Kenwood Cup winning teams in Hawaii 1996 and 1998 • Captain of Australian and New south Wales Southern Cross Teams 1975, 1993, 1995 1997, 2004 • Competed in 42 Sydney/Hobart races • Winner – 9 Blue Water Championships

Fischer died on 23 February 2023, at age 95.

== Awards and recognition ==
Fischer was named Australian Yachtsman of the Year in 1971-72 and again in 1992-93 and was Australian Ocean Racer of the Year in 1993, 1996 and 2002.

Fischer was appointed an Officer of the Order of the British Empire (OBE) for services to sport in the 1975 New Year Honours, and was inducted into the New South Wales Sports Hall of Fame in 2002–03. Fischer was made a Member of the Order of Australia (AM) in the 2017 Queen's Birthday Honours.

In 2018 Fischer was inducted into the America's Cup Hall of Fame and the Australian Sailing Hall of Fame.
