= 2023 Sydney to Hobart Yacht Race =

2023 annual yacht race in Australia

78th Sydney to Hobart Yacht Race
Event information
- Type: Yacht
- Dates: 26 December 2023 - 3 January 2024
- Sponsor: Rolex
- Host city: Sydney, Hobart
- Boats: 103
- Distance: 628 nautical miles (1,163 km)
- Website: Rolex Sydney Hobart

Results
- Winner (2023): LawConnect (Christian Beck)

Succession
- Previous: Andoo Comanche (John Winning, Jr.) in 2022
- Next: LawConnect (Christian Beck) 2024

The 2023 Sydney to Hobart Yacht Race, sponsored by Rolex and hosted by the Cruising Yacht Club of Australia in Sydney, was the 78th annual running of the Sydney to Hobart Yacht Race. It began on Sydney Harbour at 1 pm on Boxing Day (26 December 2023), before heading south for 628 nautical miles (1,163 km) through the Tasman Sea, Bass Strait, Storm Bay and up the River Derwent, to cross the finish line in Hobart, Tasmania.

A fleet of 103 boats contested the race and 85 finished. Line honours were claimed by LawConnect in a time of 1 day, 19 hours, 3 minutes and 58 seconds. Alive (Duncan Hine) won the Tattersall Cup.

== Results ==
=== Line Honours ===
Pos	Sail Number	Yacht	State/Country	Yacht Type	LOA (Metres)	Skipper	Elapsed time d:hh:mm:ss
1	SYD1000	LawConnect	New South Wales	Juan Yacht Design Juan-K 100	30.48	Christian Beck	1:19:03:58
2	CAY007	Andoo Comanche	New South Wales	Verdier VPLP 100 Supermaxi	30.48	John Winning Jr.	1:19:04:49
3	AUS72	URM Group	New South Wales	Reichel Pugh Maxi 72	21.80	Anthony Johnson	2:02:07:19
4	52566	Alive	Tasmania	Reichel Pugh 66	20.10	Philip Turner; Duncan Hine	2:02:19:04
5	AUS1	Moneypenny	New South Wales	Reichel Pugh 69	21.50	Sean Langman	2:04:18:40
6	AUS100	Wild Thing 100	Queensland	Botin-Ellis 100 Maxi	30.48	Grant Wharington	2:05:09:06
7	AUS 98888	No Limit	New South Wales	Reichel Pugh 63	19.20	David Gotze	3:00:08:59
8	AUS13	Whisper	New South Wales	Judel Vrolijk JV62	18.90	David Griffith	3:02:01:24
9	CAY52	Caro	New Zealand	Botin TP52	15.90	Max Klink	3:02:30:22
10	6952	Smuggler	New South Wales	Judel Vrolijk TP52	15.90	Sebastian Bohm	3:02:33:01
11	9535	Celestial	New South Wales	Judel Vrolijk TP52	15.90	Sam Haynes	3:03:12:55
12	FRA8668	Teasing Machine	France	Nivelt Muratet NMYD 54	16.50	Eric de Turckheim	3:04:24:14
13	GBR2888L	Antipodes	Hong Kong	Santa Cruz 72	22.00	Geoffrey Hill	3:07:35:37
14	7441	Bumblebee V	New South Wales	Murray Burns Dovell MBD 62	18.90	Paul Blakeley	3:07:41:23
15	52569	Denali	New South Wales	Judel Vrolijk TP52	15.90	Damian Parkes	3:08:48:41
16	OC52	Ocean Crusaders J-Bird	Queensland	Andrews TP52	15.90	Ian & Annika Thomson	3:09:13:06
17	GBR5211L	Frantic	New South Wales	Donovan TP52	15.90	Michael Martin	3:09:14:30
18	SYD5	MRV	(Victoria (state)) Victoria	Frers 61	18.50	Damien King	3:09:51:28
19	8108	Highly Sprung	New South Wales	Farr TP52	15.90	Mark Spring	3:13:40:44
20	G10007	Extasea	(Victoria (state)) Victoria	Farr Cookson 50	15.20	Paul Buchholz	3:13:40:44
21	095	Lightning	New South Wales	Bakewell-White 40	12.20	Alexander Flecknoe-Brown	3:14:17:32
22	545	Pretty Woman	New South Wales	Farr IC 45 Mod	13.80	Richard Hudson	3:14:17:50
23	M16	Mayfair	Queensland	Rogers 46	14.00	James Irvine	3:14:39:41
24	R33	Chutzpah	(Victoria (state)) Victoria	Reichel Pugh Caprice 40	12.35	Bruce Taylor	3:15:02:50
25	A5	Hutchies Yeah Baby	Queensland	Welbourn 50	15.10	Andy Lamont	3:15:14:14
26	USA16	Maritimo 54	Queensland	Schumacher 54	16.30	Kendall Barry-Cotter	3:15:14:26
27	PD147	Advantedge	Tasmania	Inglis 47	14.30	Andrew Jones	3:17:04:17
28	B45	Rush	(Victoria (state)) Victoria	Farr 45	13.80	John Paterson	3:17:35:13
29	7878	MWF Kayle	New South Wales	Lyons 54	16.20	John Whitfield	3:17:42:12
30	CAY6536	Oroton Drumfire	New South Wales	Hoek TC78	24.00	Will Vicars	3:17:57:35
31	65007	Insomnia	New South Wales	Judel Vrolijk JV42	12.80	Marcus Grimes	3:17:58:55
32	SM1245	White Noise	(Victoria (state)) Victoria	Mills M.A.T. 1245	12.45	Daniel Edwards	3:19:10:23
33	AUS49005	Carrera S	(Victoria (state)) Victoria	Reichel Pugh Marten 49	15.00	Gerard Cantwell	3:19:32:43
34	7777	Calibre 12	New South Wales	Farr Cookson 12	12.00	Richard Williams	3:19:36:42
35	1	Mistral (TH)	New South Wales	Lombard 34	10.58	Rupert Henry; Jack Bouttell	3:19:53:38
36	SM133	Patriot	(Victoria (state)) Victoria	Johnstone J133	13.30	Jason Close	3:20:29:57
37	R1180	Atomic Blonde	Western Australia	Valer JPK 11.80	11.80	Simon Torvaldsen	3:21:03:03
38	112	Voltstar Yeah Baby	New South Wales	Lombard Akilaria RC2	12.00	Louis & Marc Ryckmans	3:21:36:57
39	424	Minnie	New South Wales	Jones 42	12.90	Michael Bell	3:22:28:00
40	5656	Mondo	New South Wales	Murray Burns Dovell Sydney 38	11.80	Lisa Callaghan	4:00:31:23
41	2208	Tenacity	Tasmania	Mills 41	12.50	John Lawrie; Vaughn Lynch	4:00:40:58
42	FRA-9777	Eye Candy	New Caledonia	Murray Burns Dovell Sydney 38	11.80	Thierry Leseigneur	4:01:19:38
43	N40	Mako	New South Wales	Murray Burns Dovell Sydney 40	12.00	Paul O'Rourke; Adam Manders	4:01:22:39
44	8338	Showdown (TH)	Queensland	Ker 40	12.20	Drew Carruthers; Jim Close	4:01:26:01
45	07	Wings	New South Wales	Judel Vrolijk Dehler 46	14.00	Ian Edwards	4:01:43:04
46	RQ130	Ragtime	New South Wales	Johnstone J130	13.00	Steve Watson	4:02:08:16
47	6723	Allegro	New South Wales	Warwick 67	20.30	Adrian Lewis	4:02:13:24
48	11744	XS Moment BNMH	New South Wales	Jeppesen XP44	13.30	Ray Hudson	4:03:22:50
49	R62	Rockall 8	Germany	Valer JPK 10.80	10.80	Christopher Opielok	4:03:47:30
50	D3300	Kraken 111 (TH)	Tasmania	Andrieu Jeanneau Sunfast 3300	10.00	Rob Gough; John Saul	4:03:49:47
51	3838	Clockwork	South Australia	Murray Burns Dovell Sydney 38	11.80	Andrew Lloyd; Mary Ann Harvey	4:03:54:46
52	8679	Merit	Queensland	Farr Volvo Ocean 60	19.30	Michael Schwarzel	4:04:34:14
53	SYD8	Amazingrace	New South Wales	Frers Swan Class 45	13.80	Malcolm Roe	4:04:35:12
54	R1111	Toecutter	(Victoria (state)) Victoria	Hick 10	10.00	Robert Hick; Brad Bult	4:04:38:00
55	AUS888	Min River (TH)	New South Wales	Valer JPK 10.30	10.30	Jiang Lin; Aymeric Belloir	4:04:46:02
56	3375	Cinnamon Girl-Eden Capital (TH)	(Republic of Ireland) Ireland	Andrieu Jeanneau Sunfast 3300	10.00	Cian McCarthy; Sam Hunt	4:05:28:48
57	ST36	Midnight Rambler	Tasmania	Murray Burns Dovell Sydney 36	10.80	Ed Psaltis	4:05:28:48
58	AUS99	Disko Trooper_Contender Sailcloth	New South Wales	Johnstone J99	9.90	Jules Hall	4:07:10:15
59	NZL30040	Niksen (TH)	New Zealand	Judel Vrolijk Dehler 30 OD	9.10	Marc Michel; Logan Fraser	4:07:46:28
60	370	She's The Culprit	New South Wales	Inglis-Jones 39 Modified	12.00	Glen Picasso	4:07:48:17
61	6499	Supernova	New South Wales	Murray Burns Dovell Sydney 36	10.80	Alex Seja; Felicity Nelson	4:08:28:42
62	0404	Navy One	New South Wales	Farr Beneteau First 40	12.20	Nathan Lockhart; Tori Costello	4:08:42:00
63	6808	Flying Cloud	New South Wales	Farr Beneteau First 40	12.20	David Myers; George Martin	4:08:48:57
64	294	Love & War	New South Wales	Sparkman & Stephens S&S 47	14.21	Simon Kurts	4:09:32:22
65	2400	Avalanche (TH)	New South Wales	Hick 40	12.30	James Murchison; James Francis	4:11:18:24
66	5038	Cinquante	New South Wales	Murray Burns Dovell Sydney 38	11.80	Kim Jaggar	4:12:38:55
67	R3600	Wyuna	Western Australia	Andrieu Jeanneau Sunfast 3600	10.80	Hilary Arhure	4:15:37:21
68	AUS110	Blue Planet (TH)	New South Wales	Johnstone J99	9.90	Chris O'Neill; Michael Tom Johnson	4:17:03:49
69	G1350	Solera	(Victoria (state)) Victoria	Elliott 1350 Tourer	13.50	Stuart Richardson	4:17:41:57
70	4411	Verite (TH)	New South Wales	Johnstone J99	9.90	Paul Beath; Richard Hooper	4:19:02:44
71	USA44444	Lenny	United States	Biscontini Argento Beneteau First 44	14.20	Charles Devanneaux	4:20:24:15
72	SM888	Ciao Bella	New South Wales	Judel Vrolijk Hanse 505	15.00	Karl Onslow	4:21:53:01
73	RQ3600	Mister Lucky (TH)	Queensland	Andrieu Jeanneau Sun Fast 3600	11.30	Rohan Wood; Mark Hipgrave	5:01:41:14
74	AUS117	Tilting at Windmills	(Victoria (state)) Victoria	Dory Joubert Modified 42	12.80	John Alexander	5:01:42:50
75	HKG1943	Zephyr Insurance Masters	Tasmania	Farr 41 MX	12.60	Ian Johnston	5:01:43:09
76	4343	Wild Oats	New South Wales	Farr 43	13.11	Gordon Smith; Stuart Byrne	5:01:59:53
77	3430	Azzurro	Queensland	Sparkman & Stephens S&S 34	10.10	Jack Kilner	5:02:44:00
78	6893	Imalizard (TH)	New South Wales	Welbourn 12	11.80	Bruce Watson; Frederic Chanut	5:04:14:56
79	MH31	Son of a Son	Queensland	Farr 1104	11.00	Peter Webster	5:04:46:04
80	7551	Flying Fish Arctos	New South Wales	Radford McIntyre 55	15.36	Drew Hulton-Smith	5:04:48:04
81	603	Hansen Tasmania	Tasmania	Buizen 48	14.70	John Townley	5:10:45:20
82	GBR5790R	Enigma	New South Wales	Farr Beneteau First 47.7	14.90	Jason Bond	5:19:51:36
83	NZL5206	Allegresse (TH)	New Zealand	Clarke 42	12.80	Michael & Tracy Carter	6:17:42:27
84	NZL6702	Silver Fern	Queensland	Bakewell-White Birdsall 72	21.30	David Hows	7:04:48:03
85	1019	Sylph IV	New South Wales	Payne 41 Custom Sloop	12.50	Robert Williams; Chris Warren	7:19:26:15
DNF	S17	Arcadia	(Victoria (state)) Victoria	Joubert Nivelt Archambault 40 RC	12.00	Peter Davison	Retired-Mainsail Damage
DNF	SM377	Bacardi	(Victoria (state)) Victoria	Peterson 44	13.34	Brett Averay	Retired-Rigging Damage
DNF	7374	Currawong (TH)	New South Wales	Joubert Currawong 30	9.10	Katherine Veel; Bridget Canham	Retired-Electrical Issues
DNF	B47	Cyan Moon	(Victoria (state)) Victoria	Finot Beneteau Oceanis 473	14.30	Mark Gibbs	Retired-Rig Damage
DNF	6333	Georgia Express	New South Wales	Farr Mumm 36	10.90	Sebastian Hultin	Retired-Riggin Damage
DNF	NZL8425	Gunshot	New South Wales	Elliott 52	16.00	David Walsh	Retired-Sail Damage
DNF	262	Helsal 3	New South Wales	Adams 20	20.00	Rob Fisher	Retired-Equipment Damage
DNF	7809	Luna Blue	New South Wales	Briand Beneteau First 45	14.10	John Turnbull; David Watson; Steve Kellaway	Retired-Equipment Damage
DNF	SYC52	Maritimo 52	Queensland	Reichel Pugh TP52	15.85	Michael Spies	Retired-Rigging Damage
DNF	M888	Millennium Falcon	New South Wales	Sparkman & Stephens S&S 39	11.90	Robert Griffits	Retired-Crew Illness
DNF	110	Pacman (TH)	Queensland	Young 11	11.00	Peter Elkington; Scott Cavanough	Retired-Runner Damage
DNF	20	Philosopher (TH)	New South Wales	Murray Burns Dovell Sydney 36 CR	11.30	David Henry; Stephen Prince	Retired-Rigging Damage
DNF	1808	Rum Rebellion (TH)	New South Wales	Johnstone J99	9.90	Shane Connelly; Tony Sutton	Retired-Minor Crew Injury
DNF	GBR5672L	Salt Lines	New South Wales	Giles Shipwright 70	21.00	Matthew Harvey	Retired-Sail Damage
DNF	4924	She	Queensland	Mull Olsen 40	12.00	Philip Bell	Retired-Mainsail Damage
DNF	HKG2276	SHK Scallywag 100	Hong Kong	Dovell 100	30.48	David Witt	Retired-Broken Bowsprit
DNF	A164	Sticky	New South Wales	Farr Cookson 50	15.40	Richard Harris	Retired-Electrical Damage
DNF	AUS077	Tumbleweed (TH)	New South Wales	Andrieu Jeanneau Sun Fast 3300	10.00	Graham Biehl; Nigel Nattrass	Retired-Crew Illness

=== Overall Handicap ===
Pos	Division	Sail Number	Yacht	State/Country	Yacht Type	LOA (Metres)	Skipper	Corrected time d:hh:mm:ss
1	0	52566	Alive	Tasmania	Reichel Pugh 66	20.10	Philip Turner; Duncan Hine	3:07:48:14
2	0	AUS72	URM Group	New South Wales	Reichel Pugh Maxi 72	21.80	Anthony Johnson	3:08:08:42
3	0	AUS1	Moneypenny	New South Wales	Reichel Pugh 69	21.50	Sean Langman	3:09:52:01
4	0	SYD1000	LawConnect	New South Wales	Juan Yacht Design Juan-K 100	30.48	Christian Beck	3:12:55:35
5	0	CAY007	Andoo Comanche	New South Wales	Verdier VPLP 100 Supermaxi	30.48	John Winning Jr.	3:16:00:47
6	4	1	Mistral (TH)	New South Wales	Lombard 34	10.58	Rupert Henry; Jack Bouttell	4:01:57:32
7	0	AUS100	Wild Thing 100	Queensland	Botin-Ellis 100 Maxi	30.48	Grant Wharington	4:03:52:19
8	2	SYD5	MRV	(Victoria (state)) Victoria	Frers 61	18.50	Damien King	4:04:06:43
9	3	SM133	Patriot	(Victoria (state)) Victoria	Johnstone J133	13.30	Jason Close	4:04:32:48
10	5	D3300	Kraken 111 (TH)	Tasmania	Jeanneau Sunfast 3300	10.00	Rob Gough; John Saul	4:55:55:34
11	1	6952	Smuggler	New South Wales	Judel Vrolijk TP52	15.90	Sebastian Bohm	4:06:34:52
12	5	AUS888	Min River (TH)	New South Wales	Valer JPK 10.30	10.30	Jiang Lin; Aymeric Belloir	4:06:46:57
13	3	R1180	Atomic Blonde	Western Australia	Valer JPK 11.80	11.80	Simon Torvaldsen	4:06:49:16
14	4	R62	Rockall 8	Germany	Valer JPK 10.80	10.80	Christopher Opielok	4:07:35:02
15	2	545	Pretty Woman	New South Wales	Farr IC 45 Mod	13.80	Richard Hudson	4:07:38:35
16	3	SM1245	White Noise	(Victoria (state)) Victoria	Mills M.A.T. 1245	12.45	Daniel Edwards	4:07:39:50
17	5	3375	Cinnamon Girl-Eden Capital (TH)	(Republic of Ireland) Ireland	Andrieu Jeanneau Sunfast 3300	10.00	Cian McCarthy; Sam Hunt	4:08:11:38
18	2	R33	Chutzpah	(Victoria (state)) Victoria	Reichel Pugh Caprice 40	12.35	Bruce Taylor	4:08:11:44
19	3	7777	Calibre 12	New South Wales	Farr Cookson 12	12.00	Richard Williams	4:08:15:15
20	1	9535	Celestial	New South Wales	Judel Vrolijk TP52	15.90	Sam Haynes	4:08:23:56
21	4	ST36	Midnight Rambler	Tasmania	Murray Burns Dovell Sydney 36	10.80	Ed Psaltis	4:08:25:23
22	5	AUS99	Disko Trooper_Contender Sailcloth	New South Wales	Johnstone J99	9.90	Jules Hall	4:08:30:43
23	1	CAY52	Caro	New Zealand	Botin TP52	15.90	Max Klink	4:09:30:02
24	1	OC52	Ocean Crusaders J-Bird	Queensland	Andrews TP52	15.90	Ian & Annika Thomson	4:09:35:02
25	3	5656	Mondo	New South Wales	Murray Burns Dovell Sydney 38	11.80	Lisa Callaghan	4:09:47:21
26	1	FRA8668	Teasing Machine	France	Nivelt Muratet NMYD 54	16.50	Eric de Turckheim	4:09:49:10
27	2	USA16	Maritimo 54	Queensland	Schumacher 54	16.30	Kendall Barry-Cotter	4:09:54:36
28	4	R1111	Toecutter	(Victoria (state)) Victoria	Hick 10	10.00	Robert Hick; Brad Bult	4:10:22:10
29	3	FRA-9777	Eye Candy	New Caledonia	Murray Burns Dovell Sydney 38	11.80	Thierry Leseigneur	4:10:51:55
30	5	294	Love & War	New South Wales	Sparkman & Stephens S&S 47	14.21	Simon Kurts	4:10:54:41
31	3	RQ130	Ragtime	New South Wales	Johnstone J130	13.00	Steve Watson	4:11:33:32
32	1	7441	Bumblebee V	New South Wales	Murray Burns Dovell MBD 62	18.90	Paul Blakeley	4:12:03:33
33	4	6499	Supernova	New South Wales	Murray Burns Dovell Sydney 36	10.80	Alex Seja; Felicity Nelson	4:12:14:22
34	2	095	Lightning	New South Wales	Bakewell-White 40	12.20	Alexander Flecknoe-Brown	4:12:17:48
35	2	B45	Rush	(Victoria (state)) Victoria	Farr 45	13.80	John Paterson	4:12:24:01
36	1	GBR5211L	Frantic	New South Wales	Donovan TP52	15.90	Michael Martin	4:12:51:50
37	1	52569	Denali	New South Wales	Judel Vrolijk TP52	15.90	Damian Parkes	4:13:29:58
38	3	3838	Clockwork	South Australia	Murray Burns Dovell Sydney 38	11.80	Andrew Lloyd; Mary Ann Harvey	4:13:30:16
39	1	GBR2888L	Antipodes	Hong Kong	Santa Cruz 72	22.00	Geoffrey Hill	4:13:31:15
40	0	AUS 98888	No Limit	New South Wales	Reichel Pugh 63	19.20	David Gotze	4:13:35:44
41	2	M16	Mayfair	Queensland	Rogers 46	14.00	James Irvine	4:13:42:48
42	2	PD147	Advantedge	Tasmania	Inglis 47	14.30	Andrew Jones	4:14:42:57
43	2	65007	Insomnia	New South Wales	Judel Vrolijk JV42	12.80	Marcus Grimes	4:14:46:04
44	3	2208	Tenacity	Tasmania	Mills 41	12.50	John Lawrie; Vaughn Lynch	4:15:11:07
45	3	07	Wings	New South Wales	Judel Vrolijk Dehler 46	14.00	Ian Edwards	4:15:12:10
46	2	A5	Hutchies Yeah Baby	Queensland	Welbourn 50	15.10	Andy Lamont	4:15:29:21
47	4	NZL30040	Niksen (TH)	New Zealand	Judel Vrolijk Dehler 30 OD	9.10	Marc Michel; Logan Fraser	4:15:52:08
48	0	AUS13	Whisper	New South Wales	Judel Vrolijk JV62	18.90	David Griffith	4:15:55:24
49	2	424	Minnie	New South Wales	Jones 42	12.90	Michael Bell	4:16:47:36
50	4	6808	Flying Cloud	New South Wales	Farr Beneteau First 40	12.20	David Myers; George Martin	4:16:59:29
51	4	0404	Navy One	New South Wales	Farr Beneteau First 40	12.20	Nathan Lockhart; Tori Costello	4:17:23:24
52	3	11744	XS Moment BNMH	New South Wales	Jeppesen XP44	13.30	Ray Hudson	4:17:29:33
53	2	AUS49005	Carrera S	(Victoria (state)) Victoria	Reichel Pugh Marten 49	15.00	Gerard Cantwell	4:17:41:57
54	5	AUS110	Blue Planet (TH)	New South Wales	Johnstone J99	9.90	Chris O'Neill; Michael Tom Johnson	4:18:04:52
55	5	3430	Azzurro	Queensland	Sparkman & Stephens S&S 34	10.10	Jack Kilner	4:18:30:37
56	2	112	Voltstar Yeah Baby	New South Wales	Lombard Akilaria RC2	12.00	Louis & Marc Ryckmans	4:18:57:37
57	1	8108	Highly Sprung	New South Wales	Farr TP52	15.90	Mark Spring	4:19:10:42
58	1	G10007	Extasea	(Victoria (state)) Victoria	Farr Cookson 50	15.20	Paul Buchholz	4:19:50:16
59	4	R3600	Wyuna	Western Australia	Andrieu Jeanneau Sunfast 3600	10.80	Hilary Arhure	4:20:32:02
60	5	4411	Verite (TH)	New South Wales	Johnstone J99	9.90	Paul Beath; Richard Hooper	4:20:46:16
61	2	8338	Showdown (TH)	Queensland	Ker 40	12.20	Drew Carruthers; Jim Close	4:21:06:55
62	2	SYD8	Amazingrace	New South Wales	Frers Swan Class 45	13.80	Malcolm Roe	4:21:41:11
63	3	5038	Cinquante	New South Wales	Murray Burns Dovell Sydney 38	11.80	Kim Jaggar	4:22:19:06
64	5	MH31	Son of a Son	Queensland	Farr 1104	11.00	Peter Webster	5:01:31:26
65	3	2400	Avalanche (TH)	New South Wales	Hick 40	12.30	James Murchison; James Francis	5:02:26:13
66	3	G1350	Solera	(Victoria (state)) Victoria	Elliott 1350 Tourer	13.50	Stuart Richardson	5:05:17:47
67	4	RQ3600	Mister Lucky (TH)	Queensland	Andrieu Jeanneau Sun Fast 3600	11.30	Rohan Wood; Mark Hipgrave	5:06:04:05
68	4	HKG1943	Zephyr Insurance Masters	Tasmania	Farr 41 MX	12.60	Ian Johnston	5:06:49:53
69	4	AUS117	Tilting at Windmills	(Victoria (state)) Victoria	Dory Joubert Modified 42	12.80	John Alexander	5:07:11:28
70	3	USA44444	Lenny	United States	Biscontini Argento Beneteau First 44	14.20	Charles Devanneaux	5:12:07:07
71	5	NZL5206	Allegresse (TH)	New Zealand	Clarke 42	12.80	Michael & Tracy Carter	6:15:07:13
DNF	4	S17	Arcadia	(Victoria (state)) Victoria	Joubert Nivelt Archambault 40 RC	12.00	Peter Davison	Retired-Mainsail Damage
DNF	4	SM377	Bacardi	(Victoria (state)) Victoria	Peterson 44	13.34	Brett Averay	Retired-Rigging Damage
DNF	5	7374	Currawong (TH)	New South Wales	Joubert Currawong 30	9.10	Katherine Veel; Bridget Canham	Retired-Electrical Issues
DNF	4	6333	Georgia Express	New South Wales	Farr Mumm 36	10.90	Sebastian Hultin	Retired-Riggin Damage
DNF	1	SYC52	Maritimo 52	Queensland	Reichel Pugh TP52	15.85	Michael Spies	Retired-Rigging Damage
DNF	5	M888	Millennium Falcon	New South Wales	Sparkman & Stephens S&S 39	11.90	Robert Griffits	Retired-Crew Illness
DNF	3	110	Pacman (TH)	Queensland	Young 11	11.00	Peter Elkington; Scott Cavanough	Retired-Runner Damage
DNF	4	20	Philosopher (TH)	New South Wales	Murray Burns Dovell Sydney 36 CR	11.30	David Henry; Stephen Prince	Retired-Rigging Damage
DNF	5	1808	Rum Rebellion (TH)	New South Wales	Johnstone J99	9.90	Shane Connelly; Tony Sutton	Retired-Minor Crew Injury
DNF	0	HKG2276	SHK Scallywag 100	Hong Kong	Dovell 100	30.48	David Witt	Retired-Broken Bowsprit
DNF	1	A164	Sticky	New South Wales	Farr Cookson 50	15.40	Richard Harris	Retired-Electrical Damage
DNF	5	AUS077	Tumbleweed (TH)	New South Wales	Andrieu Jeanneau Sun Fast 3300	10.00	Graham Biehl; Nigel Nattrass	Retired-Crew Illness
