= 2019 Sydney to Hobart Yacht Race =

2019 annual yacht race in Australia

75th Sydney to Hobart Yacht Race
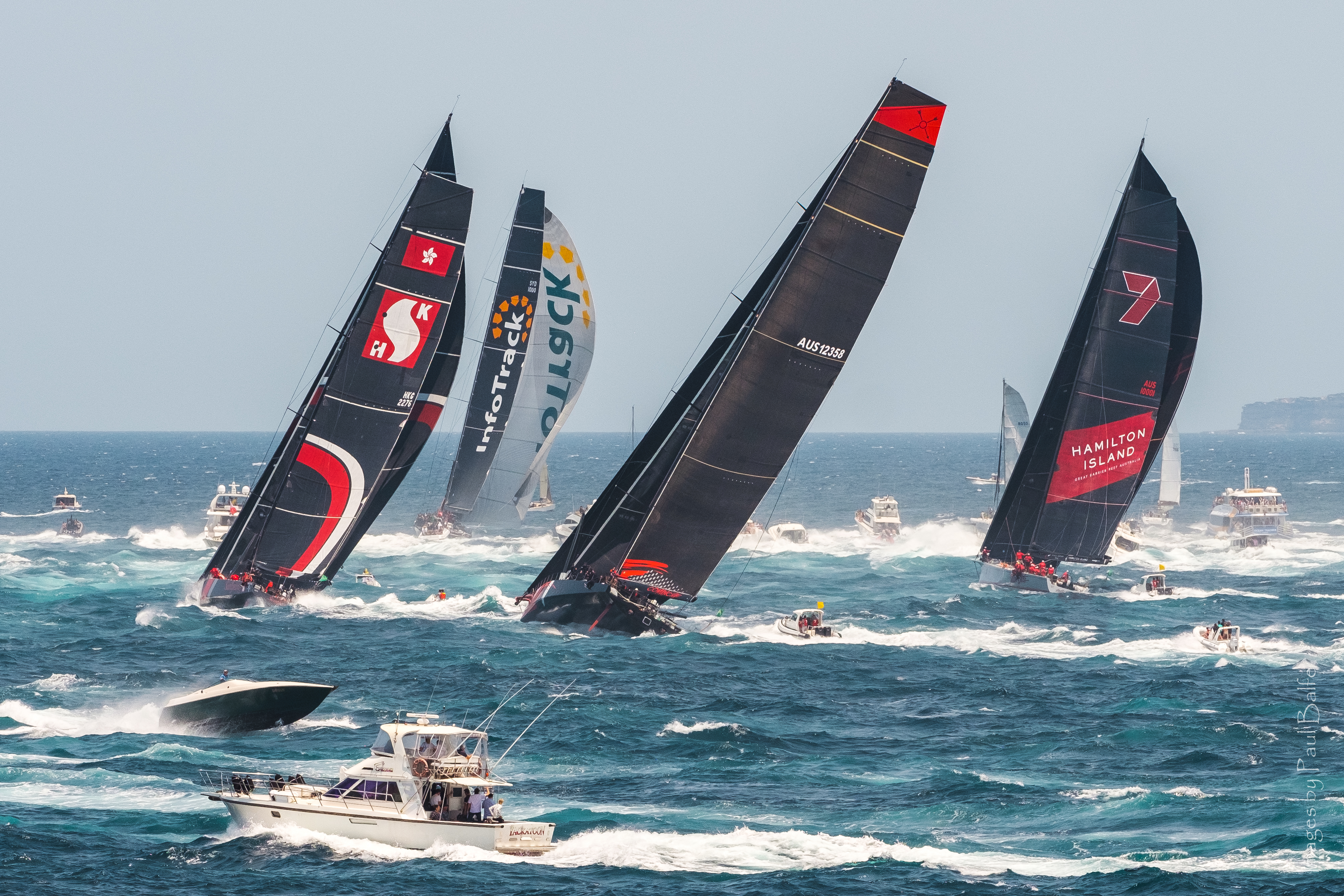

Event information
- Type: Yacht
- Dates: 26–31 December 2019
- Sponsor: Rolex
- Host city: Sydney, Hobart
- Boats: 157
- Distance: 628 nautical miles (1,163 km)
- Website: Website archive

Results
- Winner (2019): Comanche (Jim Cooney & Samantha Grant)

Succession
- Previous: Wild Oats XI (Mark Richards) in 2018
- Next: None (2020) - cancelled

The 2019 Sydney to Hobart Yacht Race was the 75th annual running of the Sydney to Hobart Yacht Race. Hosted by the Cruising Yacht Club of Australia sponsored by Rolex, it began on Sydney Harbour at 13:00 on 26 December 2019, before heading south for 628 nautical miles (1,163 km) via the Tasman Sea, Bass Strait, Storm Bay and up the River Derwent, to cross the finish line in Hobart, Tasmania.

A fleet of 157 boats contested the race and 154 finished. Line honours were claimed by LDV Comanche in a time of 1 day, 18 hours, 30 minutes and 24 seconds. Ichi Ban (Matt Allen) won her second Tattersall Cup.

== Results ==
=== Line Honours ===
Pos	Sail Number	Yacht	State/Country	Yacht Type	LOA (Metres)	Skipper	Elapsed time d:hh:mm:ss
1	AUS12358	Comanche	New South Wales	Verdier VPLP 100 Supermaxi	30.48	Jim Cooney; Samantha Grant	1:18:30:24
2	SYD1000	InfoTrack	New South Wales	Juan Yacht Design Juan-K 100	30.48	Christian Beck; Joe Akacich	1:19:14:42
3	10001	Wild Oats XI	New South Wales	Reichel Pugh 100	30.48	Mark Richards	1:20:12:52
4	HKG2276	SHK Scallywag 100	Hong Kong	Dovell 100	30.48	Seng Huang Lee; David Witt	1:20:13:30
5	525100	Black Jack	Monaco	Reichel Pugh 100	30.48	Peter Harburg; Mark Bradford	1:20:28:56
6	52566	Alive	Tasmania	Reichel Pugh 66	20.10	Philip Turner; Duncan Hine	2:01:13:55
7	AUS13	Chinese Whisper	New South Wales	Judel Vrolijk 62	18.90	David Griffith	2:04:24:41
8	AUS1	Naval Group	New South Wales	Reichel Pugh 69	21.50	Sean Langman	2:04:26:32
9	60272	URM	New South Wales	Reichel Pugh Maxi 72	21.95	Anthony Johnston; Marcus Ashley-Jones	2:04:33:46
10	AUS98888	No Limit	New South Wales	Reichel Pugh 63	19.20	David Gotze	2:04:55:41
11	AUS001	Ichi Ban	New South Wales	Botin TP 52	15.85	Matt Allen	2:06:18:05
12	ITA70	Maserati	Poland	Juan-K Volvo Open 70	21.50	Jacek Piotrowski; Jacek Siwek	2:06:31:54
13	052	Gweilo	New South Wales	Judel Vrolijk TP 52	15.85	Matt Donald; Chris Townsend; Wade Morgan	2:06:42:36
14	AUS98888	Quest	New South Wales	Farr TP 52	15.84	Craig Neil; Bob Steel; Mike Green	2:08:59:36
15	RQ0052	Envy Scooters	Queensland	Judel Vrolijk TP 52	15.85	Barry Cuneo	2:09:05:49 ^{1}
16	SM9535	Celestial	New South Wales	Judel Vrolijk TP 52	15.85	Sam Haynes	2:11:01:57
17	6952	Smuggler	New South Wales	Judel Vrolijk TP 52	15.85	Sebastian Bohm	2:11:02:47
18	52001	Zen	New South Wales	Botin TP52	15.90	Gordon Ketelbey	2:11:08:09
19	GBR4945R	Maverick 49	(United Kingdom) Great Britain	Welbourne Infiniti 46r	14.10	Quentin Stewart	2:11:39:47
20	5200	Bush Paul Group	New South Wales	Farr TP 52	15.85	Mathew Short	2:12:48:29
21	HUN108	Stay Calm Hungary	Hungary	Farr TP 52	15.85	Aron Ormandlaki	2:16:50:29
22	FRA43842	Daguet	France	Ker 46	15.80	Frederic Puzin	2:18:58:31
23	7700	About Time	New South Wales	Farr Cookson 50	15.40	Julian Farren-Price	3:01:12:51
24	S777	Primitive Cool	(Victoria (state)) Victoria	Reichel Pugh RP51	15.61	John Newbold	3:01:13:20
25	52152	Koa	New South Wales	Farr TP 52	15.85	Peter Wrigley; Andrew Kearnan	3:01:13:21
26	8338	LCE Showtime	New South Wales	Ker 40	12.20	Mark Griffith	3:01:30:06
27	A5	Ward Civil Yeah Baby	New South Wales	Welbourn 50	15.20	Marc & Louis Ryckmans	3:01:34:40
28	AUS5299	Oskana	Tasmania	Farr Cookson 50	15.20	Michael Pritchard	3:01:35:43
29	B330	Hartbreaker	(Victoria (state)) Victoria	Reichel Pugh 46	14.20	Tony & Gaye Walton	3:01:42:31
30	GBR5211L	Frantic	New South Wales	Donovan TP 52	15.85	Michael Martin	3:01:53:27
31	43218	Abbotts Vamp	Western Australia	Corby 49	14.90	Paul Eldrid; Chris Higham	3:01:54:24
32	JPN4321	Active Again	Queensland	Humphreys 54	16.50	Stephanie Kerin	3:01:55:00
33	G10007	Extasea	(Victoria (state)) Victoria	Farr Cookson 50	15.20	Paul Buchholz	3:01:57:07
34	6686	St Jude	New South Wales	Murray Burns Dovell Sydney 47	14.20	Noel Cornish	3:02:00:47
35	F1701	Enterprise	Western Australia	Farr 40	12.40	Anthony Kirke	3:02:03:45
36	B45	Rush	(Victoria (state)) Victoria	Farr 45	13.80	John Paterson	3:02:04:45
37	R33	Chutzpah	(Victoria (state)) Victoria	Reichel Pugh Caprice 40	12.35	Bruce Taylor	3:02:06:46
38	8008	Snowdome Occasional Coarse Language Too	New South Wales	Ker Sydney GTS 43	13.10	Warwick Shearman	3:02:08:39
39	65007	Insomnia	New South Wales	Judel Vrolijk JV42	12.80	Marcus Grimes	3:02:10:10
40	262	Helsal 3	New South Wales	Adams 20	20.00	Rob Fisher; Adrian van der Rijt	3:02:13:04
41	545	Pretty Woman	New South Wales	Farr IC 45 Mod	13.80	Richard Hudson	3:02:13:15
42	AUS615	2 Unlimited	Tasmania	Farr 40 Mod	12.40	Greg Prescott	3:02:18:43
43	AUS70	G.Y.R. Ragamuffin 50	New South Wales	Farr 50	15.20	Adrian Dunphy; Marcus Cholerton Brown	3:02:20:37
44	RQ432	Bounty Brassware Our Rush	Queensland	Mills DK46	14.10	Drew Carruthers	3:02:24:49
45	ESP6100	Happy Wanderer	New South Wales	Judel Vrolijk TP 52	15.39	Damien Parkes	3:02:31:09
46	AUS49005	Carrera S	(Victoria (state)) Victoria	Reichel Pugh Marten 49	15.00	Gerard Cantwell	3:02:34:09
47	SM133	Patriot	New South Wales	Johnstone J133	13.10	Jason Close	3:02:55:28
48	CR1	Optimus Prime	Western Australia	Reichel Pugh Marten 49	15.00	Trevor Taylor	3:03:05:15
49	7709	SailExchange	New South Wales	Farr Cookson 12	12.00	Carl Crafoord; Tim Horkings	3:03:07:44
50	9009	Night Nurse	Queensland	Farr 40	12.40	Russell McCart	3:03:12:36
51	NZL1	Mahligai	New South Wales	Murray Burns Dovell Sydney 46	14.30	Murray Owen; Jenny Kings	3:03:15:08
52	64	Van Diemen III	Tasmania	Muir 64	22.00	Robert Vaughan	3:03:18:33
53	6559	Wots Next	New South Wales	Murray Burns Dovell Sydney 47	14.20	Charles Cupit	3:03:47:32
54	B101	Team Runaway	Tasmania	Sayer 11	11.00	Jo Breen; David Aplin	3:03:50:55
55	CAY6536	Oroton Drumfire	New South Wales	Hoek TC78	24.00	Phillip Neal	3:04:02:51
56	6723	Allegro	New South Wales	Warwick 67	20.30	Adrian Lewis	3:04:14:48
57	AUS257	Charlotte	New South Wales	Briand CNB76	23.20	Ervin Vidor	3:04:27:30
58	A22	Filepro	Tasmania	Lyons 40	12.10	Tim Gadsby	3:05:02:28
59	33345	Black Sheep	Tasmania	Briand Beneteau 45	13.70	Matthew Pilkington; Rob Gourlay	3:05:12:40
60	AUS7742	Kialoa II	New South Wales	Sparkman & Stephens S&S 73 Yawl	23.00	Patrick Broughton	3:05:33:08
61	6893	Imalizard	New South Wales	Welbourn 12	11.80	Bruce Watson	3:05:44:46
62	7027	Goat	New South Wales	Murray Burns Dovell Sydney 38	11.80	Mitchell Gordon	3:05:44:54
63	5038	Cinquante	New South Wales	Murray Burns Dovell Sydney 38	11.80	Kim Jaggar	3:05:47:10
64	60408	Soozal	New South Wales	Mills King 40	12.10	Kieran & Elizabeth Mulcahy	3:05:48:56
65	07	Wings	New South Wales	Judel Vrolijk Dehler 46	14.00	Ian Edwards	3:05:49:28
66	6836	Anger Management FLG	Western Australia	J&J Salona 44	13.40	Tim Stewart	3:05:53:56
67	7878	SWD Kayle	New South Wales	Lyons 54	16.20	David Pescud	3:05:53:56
68	248	Wax Lyrical	New South Wales	Jeppesen X50	15.20	Les Goodridge	3:05:57:33
69	0477	Kioni Robotic Automation	New South Wales	Farr Beneteau First 47.7	14.80	Paul Jenkins	3:06:04:04
70	AUS7771	Highly Sprung	New South Wales	Briand Beneteau First 45	13.70	Mark Spring	3:06:10:17
71	M1	Mistral	New South Wales	Lombard 34	10.58	Pierre Gal	3:06:11:47
72	11744	XS Moment BNMH	New South Wales	Jeppesen XP44	13.30	Ray Hudson	3:06:17:22
73	SM1245	White Noise	(Victoria (state)) Victoria	Mills M.A.T. 1245	12.45	Daniel Edwards	3:06:18:42
74	1545	Dreki Sunnan	New South Wales	Briand Beneteau First 45	13.60	Ken Holmes	3:06:29:00
75	41	Matrix	Queensland	Jeppesen X41	12.60	Graham Furtado	3:06:38:30
76	N40	Mako	New South Wales	Murray Burns Dovell Sydney 40	12.00	Paul O'Rourke	3:06:47:39
77	6419	Pekljus	New South Wales	Radford 50	15.24	David Suttie	3:06:54:19
78	B10	Cartouche	(Victoria (state)) Victoria	Briand Beneteau First 50	15.00	Steven Fahey	3:06:58:00
79	R39	Jaffa	Western Australia	Runnalls 39	12.00	Terry Posma	3:07:03:49
80	6841	Papillon	New South Wales	Joubert Nivelt Archambault A40 RC	12.00	Phil Molony; Alec Snyder	3:07:24:42
81	20	Willie Smith's Philosopher	Tasmania	Murray Burns Dovell Sydney 36 CR Mod	11.30	Shaun Tiedemann	3:07:28:07
82	B454	Audere	(Victoria (state)) Victoria	Briand Beneteau First 45	13.70	John Cain	3:07:28:58
83	8300	Secret Mens Business 1	New South Wales	Murray Burns Dovell 42	12.80	David De Coster; Sally Armati	3:07:46:25
84	7174	Mille Sabords	New South Wales	Murray Burns Dovell Sydney 38	11.80	Robert Frayne	3:07:58:37
85	MH60	TSA Management	New South Wales	Murray Burns Dovell Sydney 38	11.80	Tony Levett	3:08:13:39
86	5612	Abracadabra	New South Wales	Tripp 47	14.33	James Murchison	3:08:25:23
87	2001	Quetzalcoatl	New South Wales	Jones 40	12.33	Anthony Bruce; James Lee-Warner; Antony Sweetapple	3:08:32:59
88	415	Arch Rival	New South Wales	Inglis-Jones 40	12.00	Alex Seja; Felicity Nelson	3:08:57:09
89	RP118	Dream	Queensland	Inglis 38	11.60	Craig Salter	3:08:59:50
90	RQ4077	Ocean Crusaders	Queensland	Farr Beneteau First 40.7	12.00	John Warlow	3:09:01:26
91	W1424	Mayfair	Queensland	Farr Beneteau First 40	12.20	James Irvine	3:09:38:25
92	AUS6834	HYC Breakthrough	(Republic of Ireland) Ireland	Farr Beneteau First 40	12.20	Darren Wright	3:10:43:00
93	A169	Nautical Circle	New South Wales	Nivelt Archambault 40	12.00	Robin Shaw	3:10:49:48
94	7133	Euphoria	New South Wales	Johnstone J133	13.10	Anthony Coleman	3:11:31:55
95	6669	Banter	Queensland	Briand Beneteau First 45	13.70	Mark Jacobsen; Piers Dudin	3:12:00:01
96	G54	Moody Buoys	(Victoria (state)) Victoria	Dixon Moody 54DS	17.20	Stuart Richardson	3:12:35:38
97	7551	Flying Fish Arctos	New South Wales	Radford McIntyre 55	15.36	George Martin	3:13:16:02
98	RF9095	Dare Devil	New South Wales	Farr Cookson 47	14.30	Sibby Ilzhofer	3:16:03:18
99	040	Navy One	New South Wales	Farr Beneteau First 40	12.20	Anthony Burrows	3:16:16:44
100	6262	Business as Usual	New South Wales	Murray Burns Dovell Sydney 40 CR	12.00	Mattijs Willenborg; Paul Glynn	3:16:21:15
101	7447	Another Painkiller	Queensland	Farr Beneteau First 44.7	13.40	Rod West	3:16:24:30
102	SM4	Wicked	(Victoria (state)) Victoria	Farr Beneteau First 40	12.20	Mike & Mark Welsh	3:16:26:26
103	B40	Blink	New South Wales	Farr Beneteau First 40	12.20	Mark Gorbatov; Mark Siebert	3:16:43:55
104	45	Fidelis	New South Wales	Kund Reimers 61	18.60	Nigel Stoke	3:16:55:30
105	4527	She's Apples II	Tasmania	King Jarkan 12.5	12.70	Marcus McKay	3:17:27:53
106	35	Imagination	New South Wales	Farr Beneteau First 47.7	14.50	Robin & Annette Hawthorn	3:18:02:23
107	7272	Admiral	New South Wales	Murray Burns Dovell Sydney 38	11.80	Steve Piper	3:18:11:58
108	294	Love & War	New South Wales	Sparkman & Stephens S&S 47	14.21	Simon Kurts	3:18:13:08
109	YC110S	Sintara	South Australia	Farr Beneteau First 47.7	14.90	Derek Morrison	3:18:29:05
110	370	She's The Culprit	New South Wales	Inglis-Jones 39 Modified	12.00	Glen Picasso	3:18:30:31
111	ST36	Midnight Rambler	Tasmania	Murray Burns Dovell Sydney 36	10.80	Ed Psaltis	3:18:32:23
112	SM69	Dark and Stormy	(Victoria (state)) Victoria	Murray Custom 37	11.40	Terry Kourtis; Stuart Mellington	3:18:34:29
113	H602	Turbulence	Queensland	Radford Adams 11.9	11.90	Steven Czapp	3:18:34:47
114	B45	Packaponch Scamp	Queensland	Briand Beneteau First 45	14.10	Mike Mollison	3:18:35:13
115	8565	Eve	New South Wales	Sparkman & Stephens Swan 65	20.00	Steven Capell	3:18:35:37
116	3242	Solutions	New South Wales	Judel Vrolijk Dehler 41	12.40	Stephen Dadour	3:18:38:30
117	A164	Sticky	New South Wales	J&J Salona 38	11.50	Richard Harris	3:18:45:46
118	RQ3600	Mister Lucky	Queensland	Andrieu Jeanneau Sun Fast 3600	11.30	Mark Hipgrave; Deb Fish	3:19:12:29
119	H140	Protagonist	(Victoria (state)) Victoria	Farr Beneteau First 40	12.20	Nicolas Foa; David Stoopman	3:19:26:39
120	6343	Great Xpectations	New South Wales	Jeppesen X43	12.94	Rod Wills	3:19:26:45
121	EF3601	Crush	Western Australia	Andrieu Jeanneau Sun Fast 3600	11.30	David Davenport	3:19:56:40
122	1236	Local Hero	New South Wales	Murray Burns Dovell BH36	11.00	Shane Connelly	3:19:58:36
123	00100	Encore	Queensland	Briand Jeanneau Sun Odyssey 49	14.90	Michael Tromp; Tomoko Nakanishi	3:20:37:11
124	5930	Reve	New South Wales	Farr Beneteau 45F5	14.00	Kevin Whelan	3:21:48:02
125	6661	Crystal Cutter III	New South Wales	Farr Beneteau 40.7	11.90	Charles Parry-Okeden	3:22:02:09
126	6597	Airstream	New South Wales	Berret-Racoupeau Wauquiez Centurion 40s	12.30	Warwick Taylor	3:22:44:58
127	S17	Arcadia	(Victoria (state)) Victoria	Joubert Nivelt Archambault A40 RC	12.00	Peter Davison	3:22:45:51
128	SM3600	Maverick	(Victoria (state)) Victoria	Andrieu Jeanneau Sun Fast 3600	11.70	Rod Smallman	3:22:46:36
129	5296	Magic Miles	Tasmania	Briand Dynamique 62	18.70	Michael Crew	3:22:52:59
130	8810	Ocean Gem	Queensland	Farr Beneteau 445	13.50	David Hows	3:22:58:48
131	4966	King Billy	New South Wales	King Custom 38	11.50	Phil Bennett	3:23:01:02
132	GBR5790R	Enigma	New South Wales	Farr Beneteau First 47.7	14.00	Jason Bond	3:23:02:31
133	3430	Komatsu Azzurro	New South Wales	Sparkman & Stephens S&S 34	10.10	Shane Kearns	3:23:12:14
134	6084	Sweet Chariot	New South Wales	Stanyon Buizen 48	14.60	David Henry	3:23:25:22
135	6689	Copernicus	New South Wales	Radford 12	11.99	Greg Zyner	3:23:25:58
136	8824	Chancellor	New South Wales	Farr Beneteau 47.7	14.80	Edward Tooher	3:23:33:27
137	B1	Blue Water Tracks	(Victoria (state)) Victoria	Dixon Moody 54DS	17.20	Grant Dunoon	3:23:43:24
138	SA346	Enchantress	South Australia	Muirhead 11	11.00	John Willoughby	4:00:19:20
139	M236	Santana	New South Wales	Holland Swan 43	13.00	Michael Graham	4:00:31:04
140	SA332	Audacious	South Australia	Murray Burns Dovell Sydney 38	11.80	Stuart Johnson	4:03:00:13
141	4924	She	Queensland	Mull Olsen 40 Modified	12.20	Philip Bell	4:06:36:58
142	CYC8	Katwinchar	New South Wales	Watney 32 Ketch	10.00	Bill & Kendall Barry-Cotter	4:06:47:47
143	7234	Lexi	New South Wales	Jeppesen X412 Modern	12.50	Ryan & Peter Cush	4:07:33:22
144	R261	Galaxy III	New South Wales	Sparkman & Stephens S&S 39	11.90	Chris Canty	4:07:54:10
145	M772	Tribal Warrior	New South Wales	Farr Beneteau First 47.7	14.50	Wayne Jones	4:23:53:13
146	660	Windrose	Tasmania	Sparkman & Stephens S&S 48	14.60	Ashok Mani; Sam McCracken	5:00:28:16
147	GBR9166T	Wonderland	New South Wales	Finot Beneteau Oceanis 473	14.30	Rebecca Connor	5:05:17:45
148	6921	Rogue Wave	New South Wales	Thomas Sigma 36	11.00	Kevin Le Poidevin	5:06:42:23
149	77011	Diamech Enterprise	New South Wales	Lexcen 40	12.40	Nicholas Hoskin	5:09:41:15
150	5903	Spirit of Freya	Tasmania	Briand Jeanneau Sun Fast 36	11.30	Joanne Harpur	5:11:01:12
151	USA61268	Cailin Lomhara	United States	Perry Tayana 52	16.00	Lawrence Green	5:11:03:03
152	3867	Gun Runner	New South Wales	King Jarkan 925	9.30	Maurice Young	5:11:23:13
153	2555	Natelle Two	Tasmania	Peterson 41 Two Tonner	12.40	Laura Roper	5:12:23:22
154	3639	Take Five	Tasmania	Cole Traditional 30	9.10	Ian Gannon	5:23:41:00
DNF	R6155	Faster Forward	(Victoria (state)) Victoria	Murray Burns Dovell Sydney 38	11.80	Matt Fahey	Retired-Steering Problems
DNF	AUS8899	Hollywood Boulevard	New South Wales	Farr 55	16.80	Ray Roberts	Retired-Broken Rudder
DNF	6837	Minerva	New South Wales	Reichel Pugh DK43	13.00	Edward & Timothy Cox	Retired-Rudder Bearing Damage

Notes

^1 – Envy Scooters were given a 120 minutes penalty to be added onto their elapsed time by the International Jury due to breaching RRS Part 2 in a near collision with Quest at the start of the race in Sydney Harbour.

=== Overall Handicap ===
Pos	Division Number	Sail Number	Yacht	State/Country	Yacht Type	LOA (Metres)	Skipper	Elapsed time d:hh:mm:ss
1	1	AUS001	Ichi Ban	New South Wales	Botin TP 52	15.85	Matt Allen	3:04:11:05
2	1	052	Gweilo	New South Wales	Judel Vrolijk TP 52	15.85	Matt Donald; Chris Townsend; Wade Morgan	3:04:45:29
3	1	AUS98888	Quest	New South Wales	Farr TP 52	15.85	Craig Neil; Bob Steel; Mike Green	3:06:18:32
4	0	52566	Alive	Tasmania	Reichel Pugh 66	20.10	Philip Turner; Duncan Hine	3:06:19:41
5	2	AUS13	Chinese Whisper	New South Wales	Judel Vrolijk 62	18.90	David Griffith	3:06:55:54
6	1	RQ0052	Envy Scooters	Queensland	Judel Vrolijk TP 52	15.85	Barry Cuneo	3:07:52:43
7	2	AUS98888	No Limit	New South Wales	Reichel Pugh 63	19.20	David Gotze	3:08:27:02
8	1	6952	Smuggler	New South Wales	Judel Vrolijk TP 52	15.85	Sebastian Bohm	3:09:04:14
9	5	SM133	Patriot	New South Wales	Johnstone J133	13.10	Jason Close	3:09:40:04
10	0	AUS1	Naval Group	New South Wales	Reichel Pugh 69	21.50	Sean Langman	3:09:54:53
11	1	52001	Zen	New South Wales	Botin TP52	15.90	Gordon Ketelbey	3:10:01:17
12	1	5200	Bush Paul Group	New South Wales	Farr TP 52	15.85	Mathew Short	3:10:09:06
13	2	GBR4945R	Maverick 49	(United Kingdom) Great Britain	Welbourne Infiniti 46r	14.10	Quentin Stewart	3:10:48:44
14	1	SM9535	Celestial	New South Wales	Judel Vrolijk TP 52	15.85	Sam Haynes	3:10:49:21
15	6	20	Willie Smith's Philosopher	Tasmania	Murray Burns Dovell Sydney 36 CR Mod	11.30	Shaun Tiedemann	3:11:12:13
16	5	7709	SailExchange	New South Wales	Farr Cookson 12	12.00	Carl Crafoord; Tim Horkings	3:11:14:34
17	6	M1	Mistral	New South Wales	Lombard 34	10.58	Pierre Gal	3:11:30:49
18	0	SYD1000	InfoTrack	New South Wales	Juan Yacht Design Juan-K 100	30.48	Christian Beck; Joe Akacich	3:12:11:53
19	0	60272	URM	New South Wales	Reichel Pugh Maxi 72	21.95	Anthony Johnston; Marcus Ashley-Jones	3:12:18:39
20	6	RQ4077	Ocean Crusaders	Queensland	Farr Beneteau First 40.7	12.00	John Warlow	3:12:25:37
21	4	F1701	Enterprise	Western Australia	Farr 40	12.40	Anthony Kirke	3:12:56:59
22	4	AUS615	2 Unlimited	Tasmania	Farr 40 Mod	12.40	Greg Prescott	3:13:05:04
23	5	5038	Cinquante	New South Wales	Murray Burns Dovell Sydney 38	11.80	Kim Jaggar	3:13:05:53
24	5	7027	Goat	New South Wales	Murray Burns Dovell Sydney 38	11.80	Mitchell Gordon	3:13:17:24
25	5	33345	Black Sheep	Tasmania	Briand Beneteau 45	13.70	Matthew Pilkington; Rob Gourlay	3:13:23:44
26	6	6841	Papillon	New South Wales	Joubert Nivelt Archambault A40 RC	12.00	Phil Molony; Alec Snyder	3:13:31:35
27	0	AUS12358	Comanche	New South Wales	Verdier VPLP 100 Supermaxi	30.48	Jim Cooney; Samantha Grant	3:13:46:42
28	0	525100	Black Jack	Monaco	Reichel Pugh 100	30.48	Peter Harburg; Mark Bradford	3:13:59:03
29	2	FRA43842	Daguet	France	Ker 46	15.80	Frederic Puzin	3:14:03:48
30	0	10001	Wild Oats XI	New South Wales	Reichel Pugh 100	30.48	Mark Richards	3:14:23:42
31	4	B101	Team Runaway	Tasmania	Sayer 11	11.00	Jo Breen; David Aplin	3:14:28:03
32	5	0477	Kioni Robotic Automation	New South Wales	Farr Beneteau First 47.7	14.80	Paul Jenkins	3:14:29:57
33	4	60408	Soozal	New South Wales	Mills King 40	12.10	Kieran & Elizabeth Mulcahy	3:14:31:51
34	5	B10	Cartouche	(Victoria (state)) Victoria	Briand Beneteau First 50	15.00	Steven Fahey	3:14:42:19
35	4	B10	Cartouche	(Victoria (state)) Victoria	Briand Beneteau First 50	15.00	Steven Fahey	3:14:51:26
36	5	41	Matrix	Queensland	Jeppesen X41	12.60	Graham Furtado	3:14:53:57
37	4	A22	Filepro	Tasmania	Lyons 40	12.10	Tim Gadsby	3:14:58:46
38	5	B454	Audere	(Victoria (state)) Victoria	Briand Beneteau First 45	13.70	John Cain	3:15:06:47
39	3	6686	St Jude	New South Wales	Murray Burns Dovell Sydney 47	14.20	Noel Cornish	3:15:29:00
40	1	HUN108	Stay Calm Hungary	Hungary	Farr TP 52	15.85	Aron Ormandlaki	3:15:32:09
41	3	8008	Snowdome Occasional Coarse Language Too	New South Wales	Ker Sydney GTS 43	13.10	Warwick Shearman	3:15:33:51
42	3	RQ432	Bounty Brassware Our Rush	Queensland	Mills DK46	14.10	Drew Carruthers	3:15:44:01
43	4	9009	Night Nurse	Queensland	Farr 40	12.40	Russell McCart	3:15:46:12
44	4	AUS7771	Highly Sprung	New South Wales	Briand Beneteau First 45	13.70	Mark Spring	3:15:51:53
45	5	7174	Mille Sabords	New South Wales	Murray Burns Dovell Sydney 38	11.80	Robert Frayne	3:15:58:29
46	0	HKG2276	SHK Scallywag 100	Hong Kong	Dovell 100	30.48	Seng Huang Lee; David Witt	3:16:00:28
47	4	1545	Dreki Sunnan	New South Wales	Briand Beneteau First 45	13.60	Ken Holmes	3:16:03:30
48	6	W1424	Mayfair	Queensland	Farr Beneteau First 40	12.20	James Irvine	3:16:10:17
49	5	MH60	TSA Management	New South Wales	Murray Burns Dovell Sydney 38	11.80	Tony Levett	3:16:15:01
50	3	R33	Chutzpah	(Victoria (state)) Victoria	Reichel Pugh Caprice 40	12.35	Bruce Taylor	3:16:20:33
51	6	AUS6834	HYC Breakthrough	(Republic of Ireland) Ireland	Farr Beneteau First 40	12.20	Darren Wright	3:16:30:25
52	7	3430	Komatsu Azzurro	New South Wales	Sparkman & Stephens S&S 34	10.10	Shane Kearns	3:16:43:48
53	4	07	Wings	New South Wales	Judel Vrolijk Dehler 46	14.00	Ian Edwards	3:16:52:32
54	4	SM1245	White Noise	(Victoria (state)) Victoria	Mills M.A.T. 1245	12.45	Daniel Edwards	3:17:16:31
55	3	6559	Wots Next	New South Wales	Murray Burns Dovell Sydney 47	14.20	Charles Cupit	3:17:17:00
56	3	8338	LCE Showtime	New South Wales	Ker 40	12.20	Mark Griffith	3:17:35:55
57	3	B45	Rush	(Victoria (state)) Victoria	Farr 45	13.80	John Paterson	3:17:38:09
58	3	545	Pretty Woman	New South Wales	Farr IC 45 Mod	13.80	Richard Hudson	3:17:43:59
59	4	11744	XS Moment BNMH	New South Wales	Jeppesen XP44	13.30	Ray Hudson	3:17:57:16
60	4	N40	Mako	New South Wales	Murray Burns Dovell Sydney 40	12.00	Paul O'Rourke	3:18:08:26
61	3	65007	Insomnia	New South Wales	Judel Vrolijk JV42	12.80	Marcus Grimes	3:19:09:15
62	7	CYC8	Katwinchar	New South Wales	Watney 32 Ketch	10.00	Bill & Kendall Barry-Cotter	3:19:10:49
63	3	8300	Secret Mens Business 1	New South Wales	Murray Burns Dovell 42	12.80	David De Coster; Sally Armati	3:20:03:31
64	7	8300	Secret Mens Business 1	New South Wales	Murray Burns Dovell 42	12.80	David De Coster; Sally Armati	3:20:12:13
65	3	CAY6536	Oroton Drumfire	New South Wales	Hoek TC78	24.00	Phillip Neal	3:20:28:26
66	6	4527	She's Apples II	Tasmania	King Jarkan 12.5	12.70	Marcus McKay	3:20:35:46
67	3	AUS49005	Carrera S	(Victoria (state)) Victoria	Reichel Pugh Marten 49	15.00	Gerard Cantwell	3:20:45:51
68	4	7133	Euphoria	New South Wales	Johnstone J133	13.10	Anthony Coleman	3:20:53:15
69	2	CR1	Optimus Prime	Western Australia	Reichel Pugh Marten 49	15.00	Trevor Taylor	3:20:57:30
70	3	AUS7742	Kialoa II	New South Wales	Sparkman & Stephens S&S 73 Yawl	23.00	Patrick Broughton	3:20:59:06
71	5	6669	Banter	Queensland	Briand Beneteau First 45	13.70	Mark Jacobsen; Piers Dudin	3:21:09:13
72	2	43218	Abbotts Vamp	Western Australia	Corby 49	14.90	Paul Eldrid; Chris Higham	3:21:25:05
73	0	ITA70	Maserati	Poland	Juan-K Volvo Open 70	21.50	Jacek Piotrowski; Jacek Siwek	3:21:31:19
74	6	ST36	Midnight Rambler	Tasmania	Murray Burns Dovell Sydney 36	10.80	Ed Psaltis	3:21:31:39
75	7	4966	King Billy	New South Wales	King Custom 38	11.50	Phil Bennett	3:21:41:13
76	2	64	Van Diemen III	Tasmania	Muir 64	22.00	Robert Vaughan	3:22:03:40
77	2	A5	Ward Civil Yeah Baby	New South Wales	Welbourn 50	15.20	Marc & Louis Ryckmans	3:22:19:36
78	6	RQ3600	Mister Lucky	Queensland	Andrieu Jeanneau Sun Fast 3600	11.30	Mark Hipgrave; Deb Fish	3:22:24:01
79	6	A164	Sticky	New South Wales	J&J Salona 38	11.50	Richard Harris	3:22:29:03
80	2	B330	Hartbreaker	(Victoria (state)) Victoria	Reichel Pugh 46	14.20	Tony & Gaye Walton	3:22:47:21
81	6	SM4	Wicked	(Victoria (state)) Victoria	Farr Beneteau First 40	12.20	Mike & Mark Welsh	3:23:20:20
82	6	B40	Blink	New South Wales	Farr Beneteau First 40	12.20	Mark Gorbatov; Mark Siebert	3:23:28:32
83	6	1236	Local Hero	New South Wales	Murray Burns Dovell BH36	11.00	Shane Connelly	3:23:33:50
84	6	040	Navy One	New South Wales	Farr Beneteau First 40	12.20	Anthony Burrows	3:23:36:22
85	6	EF3601	Crush	Western Australia	Andrieu Jeanneau Sun Fast 3600	11.30	David Davenport	3:23:48:22
86	7	8810	Ocean Gem	Queensland	Farr Beneteau 445	13.50	David Hows	4:00:35:41
87	5	7447	Another Painkiller	Queensland	Farr Beneteau First 44.7	13.40	Rod West	4:00:37:49
88	2	7700	About Time	New South Wales	Farr Cookson 50	15.40	Julian Farren-Price	4:01:53:14
89	6	SM3600	Maverick	(Victoria (state)) Victoria	Andrieu Jeanneau Sun Fast 3600	11.70	Rod Smallman	4:02:05:38
90	7	M236	Santana	New South Wales	Holland Swan 43	13.00	Michael Graham	4:02:15:18
91	5	3242	Solutions	New South Wales	Judel Vrolijk Dehler 41	12.40	Stephen Dadour	4:02:31:39
92	5	SM69	Dark and Stormy	(Victoria (state)) Victoria	Murray Custom 37	11.40	Terry Kourtis; Stuart Mellington	4:02:32:43
93	6	H140	Protagonist	(Victoria (state)) Victoria	Farr Beneteau First 40	12.20	Nicolas Foa; David Stoopman	4:02:34:37
94	23	S777	Primitive Cool	(Victoria (state)) Victoria	Reichel Pugh RP51	15.61	John Newbold	4:02:46:36
95	1	52152	Koa	New South Wales	Farr TP 52	15.85	Peter Wrigley; Andrew Kearnan	4:02:46:38
96	6	6597	Airstream	New South Wales	Berret-Racoupeau Wauquiez Centurion 40s	12.30	Warwick Taylor	4:02:49:25
97	6	6661	Crystal Cutter III	New South Wales	Farr Beneteau 40.7	11.90	Charles Parry-Okeden	4:03:18:07
98	7	SA346	Enchantress	South Australia	Muirhead 11	11.00	John Willoughby	4:03:18:30
99	1	GBR5211L	Frantic	New South Wales	Donovan TP 52	15.85	Michael Martin	4:03:18:33
100	5	7272	Admiral	New South Wales	Murray Burns Dovell Sydney 38	11.80	Steve Piper	4:03:18:35
101	4	45	Fidelis	New South Wales	Kund Reimers 61	18.60	Nigel Stoke	4:03:19:45
102	5	35	Imagination	New South Wales	Farr Beneteau First 47.7	14.50	Robin & Annette Hawthorn	4:03:24:14
103	2	AUS5299	Oskana	Tasmania	Farr Cookson 50	15.20	Michael Pritchard	4:04:05:22
104	5	YC110S	Sintara	South Australia	Farr Beneteau First 47.7	14.90	Derek Morrison	4:04:26:17
105	2	G10007	Extasea	(Victoria (state)) Victoria	Farr Cookson 50	15.20	Paul Buchholz	4:04:34:29
106	4	8565	Eve	New South Wales	Sparkman & Stephens Swan 65	20.00	Steven Capell	4:04:39:20
107	2	JPN4321	Active Again	Queensland	Humphreys 54	16.50	Stephanie Kerin	4:05:55:52
108	6	S17	Arcadia	(Victoria (state)) Victoria	Joubert Nivelt Archambault A40 RC	12.00	Peter Davison	4:06:15:02
109	5	GBR5790R	Enigma	New South Wales	Farr Beneteau First 47.7	14.00	Jason Bond	4:08:49:53
110	5	8824	Chancellor	New South Wales	Farr Beneteau 47.7	14.80	Edward Tooher	4:09:58:24
111	3	RF9095	Dare Devil	New South Wales	Farr Cookson 47	14.30	Sibby Ilzhofer	4:11:52:03
112	5	SA332	Audacious	South Australia	Murray Burns Dovell Sydney 38	11.80	Stuart Johnson	4:13:06:07
113	7	660	Windrose	Tasmania	Sparkman & Stephens S&S 48	14.60	Ashok Mani; Sam McCracken	4:13:44:57
114	7	3867	Gun Runner	New South Wales	King Jarkan 925	9.30	Maurice Young	4:21:51:15
115	7	6921	Rogue Wave	New South Wales	Thomas Sigma 36	11.00	Kevin Le Poidevin	4:22:51:02
116	7	5903	Spirit of Freya	Tasmania	Briand Jeanneau Sun Fast 36	11.30	Joanne Harpur	5:08:47:34
117	7	2555	Natelle Two	Tasmania	Peterson 41 Two Tonner	12.40	Laura Roper	5:11:35:42
DNF	2	AUS8899	Hollywood Boulevard	New South Wales	Farr 55	16.80	Ray Roberts	Retired-Broken Rudder
DNF	3	6837	Minerva	New South Wales	Reichel Pugh DK43	13.00	Edward & Timothy Cox	Retired-Rudder Bearing Damage
