= 2021 Sydney to Hobart Yacht Race =

2021 annual yacht race in Australia

76th Sydney to Hobart Yacht Race
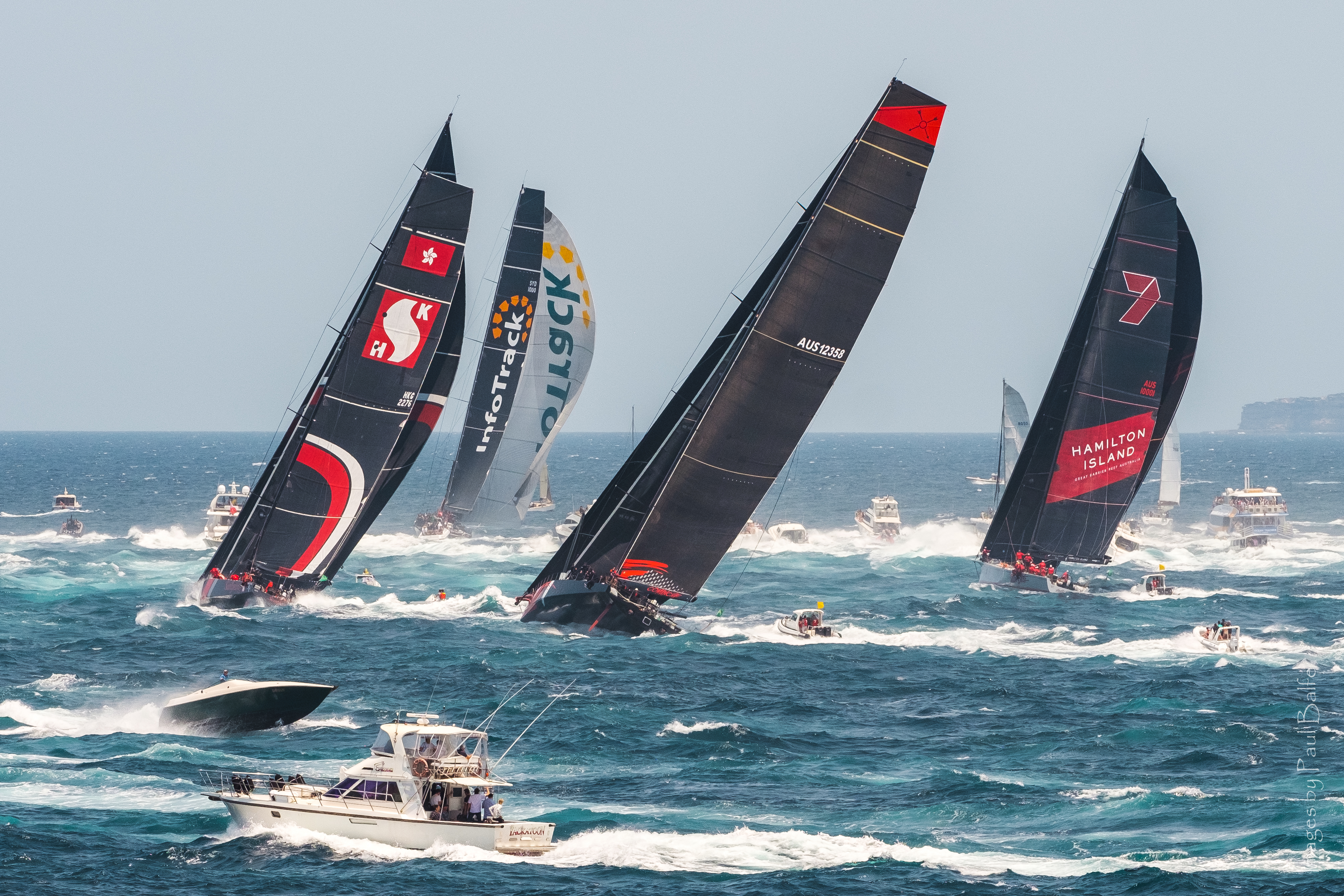

Event information
- Type: Yacht
- Dates: 26 December - 31 December 2021
- Sponsor: Rolex
- Host city: Sydney, Hobart
- Boats: 88
- Distance: 628 nautical miles (1,163 km)
- Website: Website archive

Results
- Winner (2021): Black Jack (Mark Bradford)

Succession
- Previous: None (2020) - cancelled
- Next: Andoo Comanche (John Winning, Jr.) in 2022

The 2021 Sydney to Hobart Yacht Race was the 76th annual running of the Sydney to Hobart Yacht Race, hosted by Cruising Yacht Club of Australia and sponsored by Rolex. It began on Sydney Harbour at 13:00 on 26 December 2021, before heading south for 628 nautical miles (1,163 km) via the Tasman Sea, Bass Strait, Storm Bay and up the River Derwent, to cross the finish line in Hobart, Tasmania.

Following the cancelled 2020 race, 112 entries were submitted for the 2021 edition. By 25 December, the starting lineup was down to 91 and only 88 left the harbour to start the race. The mass withdrawal was due to crew members testing positive for COVID-19 or deciding not to compete to avoid catching the virus. 5 boats withdrew in the 24 hours before the race started. For the first time, entries were accepted for a two-handed division (sailed by a crew of 2 people) but, due to the use of autopilot, they were ineligible for the overall handicap prize. Within the first two days, 36 boats retired due to injuries or damage caused by strong weather. 50 completed the race.

== Results ==
=== Line Honours ===
==== Fully-Crewed Division ====
Pos	Sail Number	Yacht	State/Country	Yacht Type	LOA (Metres)	Skipper	Elapsed time d:hh:mm:ss
1	525100	Black Jack	Monaco	Reichel Pugh 100	30.48	Mark Bradford	2:12:37:17
2	SYD1000	LawConnect	New South Wales	Juan Yacht Design Juan-K 100	30.48	Christian Beck	2:15:11:44
3	HKG2276	SHK Scallywag 100	Hong Kong	Dovell 100	30.48	David Witt	2:15:30:52
4	AUS80	Stefan Racing	New South Wales	Botin 80	24.40	Grant Wharington	3:02:20:47
5	AUS13	Whisper	New South Wales	Judel Vrolijk JV62	18.90	David Griffith	3:02:51:30
6	AUS001	Ichi Ban	New South Wales	Botin TP 52	15.90	Matt Allen	3:03:42:29 ^{1}
7	9535	Celestial	New South Wales	Judel Vrolijk TP 52	15.90	Sam Haynes	3:04:42:43 ^{2}
8	6952	Smuggler	New South Wales	Judel Vrolijk TP 52	15.90	Sebastian Bohm	3:11:14:54
9	52002	Quest	New South Wales	Farr TP 52	15.90	Mike Green	3:15:46:37
10	M16	Mayfair	Queensland	Rogers 46	14.00	James Irvine	3:23:15:33
11	USA16	Maritimo 54	Queensland	Schumacher 54	16.30	Michael Spies	4:01:43:24
12	R33	Chutzpah	(Victoria (state)) Victoria	Reichel Pugh Caprice 40	12.35	Bruce Taylor	4:02:36:01
13	545	Pretty Woman	New South Wales	Farr IC 45 Mod	13.80	Richard Hudson; David Beak	4:03:15:48
14	SYD5	MRV	(Victoria (state)) Victoria	Frers 61	18.50	Damien King	4:03:18:23
15	B330	Hartbreaker	(Victoria (state)) Victoria	Reichel Pugh 46	14.20	Antony Walton	4:04:51:15
16	8338	LCE Old School Racing	New South Wales	Mills DK46	14.00	David Elliott	4:05:34:16
17	AUS7771	Highly Sprung	New South Wales	Briand Beneteau First 45	13.70	Mark Spring	4:06:55:20
18	AUS49005	Carrera S	(Victoria (state)) Victoria	Reichel Pugh Marten 49	15.00	Gerard Cantwell	4:07:00:01
19	CAY6536	Oroton Drumfire	New South Wales	Hoek TC78	24.00	Phillip Neal	4:07:50:49
20	5038	Cinquante	New South Wales	Murray Burns Dovell Sydney 38	11.80	Kim Jaggar	4:10:00:10
21	8300	Secret Mens Business 1	New South Wales	Murray Burns Dovell 42	12.80	David De Coster; Sally Armati	4:11:11:01
22	07	Wings	New South Wales	Judel Vrolijk Dehler 46	14.00	Ian Edwards	4:11:35:29
23	294	Love & War	New South Wales	Sparkman & Stephens S&S 47	14.21	Simon Kurts	4:12:24:44
24	G1350	Solera	(Victoria (state)) Victoria	Elliott 1350 Tourer	13.50	Stuart Richardson	4:14:05:40
25	ST36	Midnight Rambler	Tasmania	Murray Burns Dovell Sydney 36	10.80	Ed Psaltis	4:14:58:58
26	8565	Eve	New South Wales	Sparkman & Stephens Swan 65	20.00	Steven Capell; Benjamin Roulant	4:17:24:57
27	6499	Supernova	New South Wales	Murray Burns Dovell Sydney 36	10.80	Alex Seja; Felicity Nelson	4:18:34:34
28	6808	Flying Cloud	New South Wales	Farr Beneteau First 40	12.20	David Myers; George Martin	4:18:35:11
29	370	She's The Culprit	New South Wales	Inglis-Jones 39 Modified	12.00	Glen Picasso	4:18:39:23
30	RQ334	Fruit Salid 3	Queensland	Farr Beneteau First 40	12.60	Mark Drobitko	4:19:45:02
31	B52	B52	Queensland	Murray 41	12.50	Daniel Farmer	4:21:54:22
32	4077	Dodgeball	New South Wales	Farr Beneteau First 40.7	11.90	Ray Sweeney	4:22:44:21
33	4343	Wild Oats	New South Wales	Farr 43	13.11	Brett Eagle	4:23:35:05
34	3430	White Bay 6 Azzurro	New South Wales	Sparkman & Stephens S&S 34	10.10	Shane Kearns	5:01:55:55
35	7551	Flying Fish Arctos	New South Wales	Radford McIntyre 55	15.36	Drew Hulton-Smith	5:02:16:09
36	040	Navy One	New South Wales	Farr Beneteau First 40	12.20	Nathan Lockhart	5:05:27:39
37	10447	Bowline	South Australia	Farr Beneteau First 44.7	13.40	Ian Roberts	5:06:29:48
38	7809	Luna Blue	New South Wales	Briand Beneteau First 45	14.10	John Turnbull; David Watson	5:09:11:36
39	5930	Reve	New South Wales	Farr Beneteau 45F5	14.00	Kevin Whelan	5:11:21:53
40	CYC54	Solveig	New South Wales	Halvorsen 36	11.00	Anne Lawrence	5:19:40:45
DNF	52566	Alive	Tasmania	Reichel Pugh 66	20.10	Philip Turner; Duncan Hine	Retired-Hull Damage
DNF	A140	Ariel	New South Wales	Farr Beneteau First 40	12.60	Ron Forster; Philip Damp	Retired-Mainsail Damage
DNF	B40	Blink	New South Wales	Farr Beneteau First 40	12.20	Mark Gorbatov; Mark Siebert	Retired-Torn Main Sail
DNF	6834	Chancellor	New South Wales	Farr Beneteau First 40	12.60	Edward Tooher	Retired-Sail Damage
DNF	6661	Crystal Cutter III	New South Wales	Farr Beneteau 40.7	11.90	Charles Parry-Okeden	Retired-Mainsail Damage
DNF	52569	Denali	New South Wales	Judel Vrolijk TP52	15.90	Damian Parkes	Retired-Damage to Hull
DNF	SA346	Enchantress	South Australia	Muirhead 11	11.00	John Willoughby	Retired-Broken Forestay
DNF	G10007	Extasea	(Victoria (state)) Victoria	Farr Cookson 50	15.20	Paul Buchholz	Retired-Engine Issues
DNF	3867	Gun Runner	New South Wales	King Jarkan 925	9.30	Chris Connelly	Retired-Time Constraints
DNF	052	Gweilo	New South Wales	Judel Vrolijk TP52	15.90	Matt Donald; Chris Townsend	Retired-Forestay Damage
DNF	888	Huntress	Queensland	Murray Burns Dovell Sydney 39 CR Mod	12.28	Victoria Logan	Retired-Torn Mainsail
DNF	46	Khaleesi	New South Wales	Mills DK46	14.10	Rob Aldis; Sandy Farquharson	Retired-Forestay Damage
DNF	AUS7742	Kialoa II	New South Wales	Sparkman & Stephens S&S 73 Yawl	23.00	Patrick & Keith Broughton	Retired-Rigging Damage
DNF	4966	King Billy	New South Wales	King Custom 38	11.50	Phil Bennett	Retired-Chain Plate Damage
DNF	N40	Mako	New South Wales	Murray Burns Dovell Sydney 40	12.00	Paul O'Rourke; Tim Dodds	Retired-Damaged Mainsail
DNF	7174	Mille Sabords	New South Wales	Murray Burns Dovell Sydney 38	11.80	Paul Jenkins	Retired-Torn Mainsail
DNF	6837	Minerva	New South Wales	Reichel Pugh DK43	13.00	Edward & Timothy Cox	Retired-Mainsail Damage
DNF	AUS1	Moneypenny	New South Wales	Reichel Pugh 69	21.50	Sean Langman	Retired-Broken Headstay
DNF	A169	Nautical Circle	New South Wales	Nivelt Archambault 40	12.00	Robin Shaw	Retired-Rigging Issues
DNF	AUS 98888	No Limit	New South Wales	Reichel Pugh 63	19.20	David Gotze	Retired-Injured Crew Member
DNF	AUS5299	Oskana	Tasmania	Farr Cookson 50	15.20	Michael Pritchard	Retired-Broken Forestay
DNF	7779	Oz Design Patrice Six	New South Wales	Jeppesen X-41	12.50	Alexander Flecknoe-Brown	Retired-Engine Issues
DNF	SM133	Patriot	(Victoria (state)) Victoria	Johnstone J133	13.30	Jason Close	Retired-Rudder Bearing Damage
DNF	20	Philosopher	New South Wales	Murray Burns Dovell Sydney 36 CR	11.30	David Henry	Retired-Equipment Damage
DNF	MH60	TSA Management	New South Wales	Murray Burns Dovell Sydney 38	11.80	Tony Levett	Retired-Mainsail Damage
DNF	AUS72	URM	New South Wales	Reichel Pugh Maxi 72	21.80	Anthony Johnson	Retired-Damaged Mainsail
DNF	248	Wax Lyrical	New South Wales	Jeppesen X50	15.20	Les Goodridge	Retired-Equipment Damage
DNF	SM1245	White Noise	(Victoria (state)) Victoria	Mills M.A.T. 1245	12.45	Daniel Edwards	Retired-Window Damage
DNF	GBR9166T	Wonderland	New South Wales	Finot Beneteau Oceanis 473	14.30	Rebecca Connor	Retired-Equipment Issues
DNF	1612	Zara	New South Wales	Luders Cheoy Lee 47 Ketch	15.00	John Griffin	Retired-Time Constraints
DNF	52001	Zen	New South Wales	Botin TP52	15.90	Gordon Ketelbey	Retired-Injured Crew Member

Notes

^1 – Ichi Ban were given a 3 minutes redress to be subtracted off their elapsed time under RRS 62 by the International Jury after giving help in compliance with RRS 1.1 in connection with an incident involving Celestial on the second day of the race.
^2 – Celestial were given a 40 minutes penalty to be added onto their elapsed time by the International Jury due to failing to maintain a continuous listening watch on the race radio frequencies for the duration of their race as required by Sailing Instruction 31.4 (Radio Transmissions).

==== Two-Handed Division ====
Pos	Sail Number	Yacht	State/Country	Yacht Type	LOA (Metres)	Skipper	Elapsed time d:hh:mm:ss
1	112	Sidewinder (TH)	Tasmania	Lombard Akilaria RC2	12.00	Rob Gough; John Saul	4:07:12:00
2	AUS99	Disko Trooper_Contender Sailcloth (TH)	New South Wales	Johnstone J99	9.90	Jules Hall; Jan Scholten	4:14:01:42
3	5826	Salt Shaker (TH)	New South Wales	Murray Burns Dovell Sydney 36	10.99	Peter Frankel; Drew Jones	4:22:57:37
4	MY1250	Joker on Tourer (TH)	(Victoria (state)) Victoria	Elliott 1250 Tourer	12.50	Grant Chipperfield; Peter Dowdney	4:22:57:50
5	B347	Speedwell (TH)	New South Wales	Farr Beneteau 34.7	10.26	Campbell Geeves; Wendy Tuck	5:01:36:20
6	1808	Rum Rebellion (TH)	New South Wales	Johnstone J99	9.90	Shane Connelly; Graeme Dunlop	5:01:37:00
7	E2	Euphoria II (TH)	Queensland	Frers Beneteau First 42	13.08	Marc Stuart; Richard Combrink	5:05:28:03
8	1696	Flat White (TH)	New South Wales	Radford 12.2	12.20	Jen Linkova; Jason Cummings	5:06:53:38
9	MYC8	Crux (TH)	New South Wales	Sparkman & Stephens S&S 34	10.10	Carlos Aydos; Peter Grayson	5:07:47:10
10	1236	Local Hero (TH)	New South Wales	Murray Burns Dovell BH36	11.00	Mark Ayto; Antony Sweetapple	5:15:04:11
DNF	AUS 169	Eora (TH)	New South Wales	Lombard Class 40	12.20	Rupert Henry; Greg O'Shea	Retired-Broken Backstay
DNF	B3200	Hells Bells (TH)	Queensland	Andrieu Jeanneau Sunfast 3300	10.10	Lincoln Dews; Andrew Scott	Retired-Engine Issues
DNF	7811	Hip-Nautic (TH)	Tasmania	Andrieu Jeanneau Sunfast 3300	10.10	Jean-Pierre Ravanat; Drew Meincke	Retired-Damaged Headsail
DNF	SA982	Inukshuk (TH)	South Australia	Kaufman Northshore 38	11.60	Robert Large; Cameron Boogaerdt	Retired-Autopilot Issues
DNF	MH46	Kayimai (TH)	New South Wales	Humphreys Azuree 46	14.00	Michael & Matt Bell	Retired-Engine Issues
DNF	SM3600	Maverick (TH)	(Victoria (state)) Victoria	Andrieu Jeanneau Sunfast 3600	11.25	Rod Smallman; Leeton Hulley	Retired-Rudder Damage
DNF	6921	Rogue Wave (TH)	New South Wales	Thomas Sigma 36	11.00	Kevin Le Poidevin; Darrell Greig	Retired-Autopilot Issue

=== Overall Handicap ===
Pos	Division	Sail Number	Yacht	State/Country	Yacht Type	LOA (Metres)	Skipper	Corrected time d:hh:mm:ss
1	0	AUS001	Ichi Ban	New South Wales	Botin TP 52	15.90	Matt Allen	4:10:17:39
2	1	9535	Celestial	New South Wales	Judel Vrolijk TP 52	15.90	Sam Haynes	4:11:14:36
3	4	294	Love & War	New South Wales	Sparkman & Stephens S&S 47	14.21	Simon Kurts	4:14:21:49
4	4	3430	White Bay 6 Azzurro	New South Wales	Sparkman & Stephens S&S 34	10.10	Shane Kearns	4:17:38:26
5	0	AUS13	Whisper	New South Wales	Judel Vrolijk JV62	18.90	David Griffith	4:17:47:05
6	1	6952	Smuggler	New South Wales	Judel Vrolijk TP 52	15.90	Sebastian Bohm	4:18:18:00
7	4	ST36	Midnight Rambler	Tasmania	Murray Burns Dovell Sydney 36	10.80	Ed Psaltis	4:18:25:24
8	3	AUS7771	Highly Sprung	New South Wales	Beneteau First 45	13.70	Mark Spring	4:19:28:43
9	3	5038	Cinquante	New South Wales	Murray Burns Dovell Sydney 38	11.78	Kim Jaggar	4:19:58:01
10	0	525100	Black Jack	Monaco	Reichel Pugh 100	30.48	Mark Bradford	4:22:05:26
11	2	R33	Chutzpah	(Victoria (state)) Victoria	Reichel Pugh Caprice 40	12.35	Bruce Taylor	4:22:42:53
12	2	USA16	Maritimo 54	Queensland	Schumacher 54	16.30	Michael Spies	4:23:07:29
13	4	6499	Supernova	New South Wales	Murray Burns Dovell Sydney 36	10.80	Alex Seja; Felicity Nelson	4:23:09:33
14	2	6499	Supernova	New South Wales	Murray Burns Dovell Sydney 36	10.80	Alex Seja; Felicity Nelson	4:23:24:50
15	2	8338	LCE Old School Racing	New South Wales	Mills DK46	14.00	David Elliott	5:00:21:42
16	1	52002	Quest	New South Wales	Farr TP 52	15.90	Mike Green	5:00:25:48
17	2	M16	Mayfair	Queensland	Rogers 46	14.00	James Irvine	5:00:47:19
18	2	SYD5	MRV	(Victoria (state)) Victoria	Frers 61	18.50	Damien King	5:01:33:04
19	3	07	Wings	New South Wales	Judel Vrolijk Dehler 46	14.00	Ian Edwards	5:02:39:15
20	4	4077	Dodgeball	New South Wales	Farr Beneteau First 40.7	11.90	Ray Sweeney	5:02:46:35
21	3	8565	Eve	New South Wales	Sparkman & Stephens Swan 65	20.00	Steven Capell; Benjamin Roulant	5:03:03:22
22	4	RQ334	Fruit Salid 3	Queensland	Farr Beneteau First 40	12.60	Mark Drobitko	5:03:30:21
23	3	8300	Secret Mens Business 1	New South Wales	Murray Burns Dovell 42	12.80	David De Coster; Sally Armati	5:03:41:24
24	4	6808	Flying Cloud	New South Wales	Farr Beneteau First 40	12.20	David Myers; George Martin	5:03:45:12
25	0	SYD1000	LawConnect	New South Wales	Juan Yacht Design Juan-K 100	30.48	Christian Beck	5:05:07:38
26	4	4343	Wild Oats	New South Wales	Farr 43	13.11	Brett Eagle	5:05:26:40
27	0	HKG2276	SHK Scallywag 100	Hong Kong	Dovell 100	30.48	David Witt	5:06:16:00
28	2	CAY6536	Oroton Drumfire	New South Wales	Hoek TC78	24.00	Phillip Neal	5:06:16:40
29	2	AUS49005	Carrera S	(Victoria (state)) Victoria	Reichel Pugh Marten 49	15.00	Gerard Cantwell	5:07:37:02
30	4	CYC54	Solveig	New South Wales	Halvorsen 36	11.00	Anne Lawrence	5:11:01:09
31	0	AUS80	Stefan Racing	New South Wales	Botin 80	24.40	Grant Wharington	5:11:17:45
32	4	040	Navy One	New South Wales	Farr Beneteau First 40	12.20	Nathan Lockhart	5:14:52:13
33	3	10447	Bowline	South Australia	Farr Beneteau First 44.7	13.40	Ian Roberts	5:19:01:11
DNF	0	52566	Alive	Tasmania	Reichel Pugh 66	20.10	Philip Turner; Duncan Hine	Retired-Hull Damage
DNF	4	A140	Ariel	New South Wales	Farr Beneteau First 40	12.60	Ron Forster; Philip Damp	Retired-Mainsail Damage
DNF	4	B40	Blink	New South Wales	Farr Beneteau First 40	12.20	Mark Gorbatov; Mark Siebert	Retired-Torn Main Sail
DNF	4	6834	Chancellor	New South Wales	Farr Beneteau First 40	12.60	Edward Tooher	Retired-Sail Damage
DNF	4	6661	Crystal Cutter III	New South Wales	Farr Beneteau 40.7	11.90	Charles Parry-Okeden	Retired-Mainsail Damage
DNF	1	52569	Denali	New South Wales	Judel Vrolijk TP52	15.90	Damian Parkes	Retired-Damage to Hull
DNF	4	SA346	Enchantress	South Australia	Muirhead 11	11.00	John Willoughby	Retired-Broken Forestay
DNF	0	G10007	Extasea	(Victoria (state)) Victoria	Farr Cookson 50	15.20	Paul Buchholz	Retired-Engine Issues
DNF	4	3867	Gun Runner	New South Wales	King Jarkan 925	9.30	Chris Connelly	Retired-Time Constraints
DNF	1	052	Gweilo	New South Wales	Judel Vrolijk TP52	15.90	Matt Donald; Chris Townsend	Retired-Forestay Damage
DNF	2	46	Khaleesi	New South Wales	Mills DK46	14.10	Rob Aldis; Sandy Farquharson	Retired-Forestay Damage
DNF	2	AUS7742	Kialoa II	New South Wales	Sparkman & Stephens S&S 73 Yawl	23.00	Patrick & Keith Broughton	Retired-Rigging Damage
DNF	4	4966	King Billy	New South Wales	King Custom 38	11.50	Phil Bennett	Retired-Chain Plate Damage
DNF	3	7174	Mille Sabords	New South Wales	Murray Burns Dovell Sydney 38	11.80	Paul Jenkins	Retired-Torn Mainsail
DNF	3	6837	Minerva	New South Wales	Reichel Pugh DK43	13.00	Edward & Timothy Cox	Retired-Mainsail Damage
DNF	0	AUS1	Moneypenny	New South Wales	Reichel Pugh 69	21.50	Sean Langman	Retired-Broken Headstay
DNF	3	A169	Nautical Circle	New South Wales	Nivelt Archambault 40	12.00	Robin Shaw	Retired-Rigging Issues
DNF	1	AUS 98888	No Limit	New South Wales	Reichel Pugh 63	19.20	David Gotze	Retired-Injured Crew Member
DNF	0	AUS5299	Oskana	Tasmania	Farr Cookson 50	15.20	Michael Pritchard	Retired-Broken Forestay
DNF	3	7779	Oz Design Patrice Six	New South Wales	Jeppesen X-41	12.50	Alexander Flecknoe-Brown	Retired-Engine Issues
DNF	3	SM133	Patriot	(Victoria (state)) Victoria	Johnstone J133	13.30	Jason Close	Retired-Rudder Bearing Damage
DNF	4	20	Philosopher	New South Wales	Murray Burns Dovell Sydney 36 CR	11.30	David Henry	Retired-Equipment Damage
DNF	3	MH60	TSA Management	New South Wales	Murray Burns Dovell Sydney 38	11.80	Tony Levett	Retired-Mainsail Damage
DNF	1	AUS72	URM	New South Wales	Reichel Pugh Maxi 72	21.80	Anthony Johnson	Retired-Damaged Mainsail
DNF	3	SM1245	White Noise	(Victoria (state)) Victoria	Mills M.A.T. 1245	12.45	Daniel Edwards	Retired-Window Damage
DNF	4	1612	Zara	New South Wales	Luders Cheoy Lee 47 Ketch	15.00	John Griffin	Retired-Time Constraints
DNF	1	52001	Zen	New South Wales	Botin TP52	15.90	Gordon Ketelbey	Retired-Injured Crew Member
