= 2022 Sydney to Hobart Yacht Race =

2022 annual yacht race in Australia

77th Sydney to Hobart Yacht Race
Event information
- Type: Yacht
- Dates: 26–31 December 2022
- Sponsor: Rolex
- Host city: Sydney, Hobart
- Boats: 109
- Distance: 628 nautical miles (1,163 km)
- Website: Rolex Sydney Hobart

Results
- Winner (2022): Andoo Comanche (John Winning, Jr.)

Succession
- Previous: Black Jack (Mark Bradford) in 2021
- Next: LawConnect (Christian Beck) 2023

The 2022 Sydney to Hobart Yacht Race, sponsored by Rolex and hosted by the Cruising Yacht Club of Australia in Sydney, was the 77th annual running of the Sydney to Hobart Yacht Race. It began on Sydney Harbour at 1 pm on Boxing Day (26 December 2022), before heading south for 628 nautical miles (1,163 km) through the Tasman Sea, Bass Strait, Storm Bay and up the River Derwent, to cross the finish line in Hobart, Tasmania.

A fleet of 109 boats contested the race and 100 finished. Line honours were claimed by Andoo Comanche in a time of 1 day, 11 hours, 56 minutes and 48 seconds. Celestial (Sam Haynes) won the Tattersall Cup.

== Results ==
=== Line Honours ===
Pos	Sail Number	Yacht	State/Country	Yacht Type	LOA (Metres)	Skipper	Elapsed time d:hh:mm:ss
1	CAY007	Andoo Comanche	New South Wales	Verdier VPLP 100 Supermaxi	30.48	John Winning, Jr.	1:11:56:48
2	SYD1000	LawConnect	New South Wales	Juan Yacht Design Juan-K 100	30.48	Christian Beck	1:12:23:19
3	525100	Black Jack	Queensland	Reichel Pugh RP100	30.48	Mark Bradford	1:12:40:34
4	10001	Hamilton Island Wild Oats	New South Wales	Reichel Pugh RP100	30.48	Mark Richards	1:13:38:13
5	ITA70	Willow	New South Wales	Juan-K Volvo Open 70	21.50	Jim Cooney	1:18:39:52
6	AUS80	Stefan Racing	Queensland	Botin 80	24.40	Grant Wharington	1:18:41:02
7	52566	Alive	Tasmania	Reichel Pugh 66	20.10	Philip Turner; Duncan Hine	1:18:52:52
8	AUS72	URM Group	New South Wales	Reichel Pugh Maxi 72	21.80	Anthony Johnson	1:19:06:48
9	AUS1	Moneypenny	New South Wales	Reichel Pugh 69	21.50	Sean Langman	1:19:13:43
10	AUS 98888	No Limit	New South Wales	Reichel Pugh 63	19.20	David Gotze	1:21:30:26
11	CAY52	Caro	New Zealand	Botin TP52	15.90	Max Klink	1:21:49:00
12	60564	Warrior Won	United States	Judel Vrolijk TP52	15.85	Chris Sheehan	1:22:14:49
13	052	Gweilo	New South Wales	Judel Vrolijk TP52	15.90	Matt Donald; Chris Townsend	1:22:22:52
14	9535	Celestial	New South Wales	Judel Vrolijk TP52	15.90	Sam Haynes	1:22:28:05
15	AUS13	Whisper	New South Wales	Judel Vrolijk JV62	18.90	David Griffith	1:22:32:46
16	AUS52	Patrice	New South Wales	Botin TP52	15.90	Tony Kirby	1:23:31:07
17	52002	Quest	New South Wales	Farr TP52	15.85	Craig Neil	2:00:12:18
18	6952	Smuggler	New South Wales	Judel Vrolijk TP52	15.90	Sebastian Bohm	2:01:10:18
19	52001	Zen	New South Wales	Botin TP52	15.90	Gordon Ketelbey	2:01:46:56
20	F0052	Crush	Western Australia	Judel Vrolijk TP52	15.90	David Davenport	2:03:05:48
21	F1701	Enterprise Next Generation	Western Australia	Botin Carkeek GP42	12.80	Anthony Kirke	2:05:21:57 ^{1}
22	GBR2888L	Antipodes	Hong Kong	Santa Cruz 72	22.00	Geoffrey Hill	2:06:57:27
23	A6	Alegria Republic	Queensland	Ker Sydney GTS 43	13.10	Rodney Jones	2:15:07:21
24	R33	Chutzpah	(Victoria (state)) Victoria	Reichel Pugh Caprice 40	12.35	Bruce Taylor	2:15:55:59
25	52569	Denali	New South Wales	Judel Vrolijk TP52	15.90	Damian Parkes	2:17:15:18
26	46	Khaleesi	New South Wales	Mills DK46	14.10	Rob Aldis; Sandy Farquharson	2:20:20:47
27	545	Pretty Woman	New South Wales	Farr IC 45 Mod	13.80	Richard Hudson	2:20:24:23
28	M16	Mayfair	Queensland	Rogers 46	14.00	James Irvine	2:20:41:40
29	HUN68	Cassiopeia 68	Hungary	Reichel Pugh Marten 68	20.70	Demeter Nobilis	3:00:51:16
30	GBR888X	Sunrise	(United Kingdom) Great Britain	Valer JPK 11.80	11.80	Thomas Kneen	3:00:56:17
31	A5	Hutchies Yeah Baby	Queensland	Welbourn 50	15.10	Andy Lamont	3:02:17:20
32	65007	Insomnia	New South Wales	Judel Vrolijk JV42	12.80	Marcus Grimes	3:02:20:37
33	1195	Quantock	New South Wales	Elliott 13 Mod	13.00	David Hobbs	3:02:31:29
34	AUS7742	Kialoa II	New South Wales	Sparkman & Stephens S&S 73 Yawl	23.00	Patrick & Keith Broughton	3:03:15:09
35	OC52	Ocean Crusaders J-Bird (TH)	Queensland	Andrews TP52	15.90	Ian & Annika Thomson	3:04:45:23
36	424	Minnie (TH)	New South Wales	Jones 42	12.90	Michael & Oliver Bell	3:04:57:40
37	D099	Kraken 42S	Tasmania	Farr Cookson 12	11.90	Mark Bayles; Andrew Sinclair	3:05:08:34
38	B45	Rush	(Victoria (state)) Victoria	Farr 45	13.80	John Paterson	3:05:13:22
39	262	Helsal 3	New South Wales	Adams 20	20.00	Rob Fisher; Mike Rose	3:05:13:53
40	6723	Allegro	New South Wales	Warwick 67	20.30	Adrian Lewis	3:05:15:50
41	1	Mistral (TH)	New South Wales	Lombard 34	10.58	Rupert Henry; Greg O'Shea	3:05:26:12
42	MH4	Toybox 2	New South Wales	Jeppesen XP44	13.30	Ian Box	3:05:35:00
43	A140	Ariel	New South Wales	Farr Beneteau First 40	12.60	Ron Forster; Philip Damp	3:05:38:01
44	110	Pacman (TH)	Queensland	Young 11	11.00	Peter Elkington; Scott Cavanough	3:05:49:21
45	ST36	Midnight Rambler	Tasmania	Murray Burns Dovell Sydney 36	10.80	Ed Psaltis	3:07:04:09
46	7447	South Brittany	New South Wales	Farr Beneteau First 44.7	13.40	Tanguy Fournier Le Ray	3:07:13:55
47	99	KD4 (TH)	New South Wales	Judel Vrolijk Dehler 44	13.70	Joe de Kock; Richard Hooper	3:07:15:37
48	AUS7771	Z7	New South Wales	Beneteau First 45	13.70	Laurie McAllister	3:07:21:14
49	N40	Mako	New South Wales	Murray Burns Dovell Sydney 40	12.00	Paul O'Rourke; Greg Busch	3:08:27:49
50	5038	Cinquante	New South Wales	Murray Burns Dovell Sydney 38	11.80	Kim Jaggar	3:09:38:23
51	M25	Hasta la Vista	New South Wales	Murray Burns Dovell Sydney 38 OD	11.80	Jessica & Tom Grimes	3:10:28:41
52	11744	XS Moment BNMH	New South Wales	Jeppesen XP44	13.30	Ray Hudson	3:11:00:45 ^{2}
53	8009	Trouble & Strife	Queensland	Farr Cookson 12	12.00	Matthew Williams	3:11:04:13
54	NZL8425	Gunshot	New South Wales	Elliott 52	16.00	David Walsh	3:11:17:57 ^{3}
55	RQ3301	Sun Fast Racing (TH)	New South Wales	Andrieu Jeanneau Sunfast 3300	10.00	Lee Condell; Lincoln Dews	3:11:24:55
56	YC110S	Sintara	South Australia	Farr Beneteau First 47.7	14.90	Derek Morrison	3:13:05:18
57	E1	Jucasta	Western Australia	Briand Beneteau First 45	14.10	Stuart McIntyre	3:13:27:20
58	7779	Patrice Six	New South Wales	Jeppesen X-41	12.50	Alexander Flecknoe-Brown	3:14:02:58
59	3810	Coopers	Queensland	Briand Jeanneau 53	16.10	Craig Watson	3:14:14:50
60	7811	Hip-Nautic (TH)	Tasmania	Andrieu Jeanneau Sunfast 3300	10.10	Jean-Pierre Ravanat; Drew Meincke	3:14:19:30
61	6841	Papillon	South Australia	Joubert Nivelt Archambault A40 RC	12.00	Dale Price	3:14:22:29
62	FRA6900	Poulpito	New Caledonia	Murray Burns Dovell Sydney 38	11.80	David Treguier	3:14:38:18
63	8300	Secret Mens Business	New South Wales	Murray Burns Dovell 42	12.80	David De Coster; Sally Armati	3:14:42:29
64	6499	Supernova	New South Wales	Murray Burns Dovell Sydney 36	10.80	Alex Seja; Felicity Nelson	3:15:57:33
65	6419	Pekljus	New South Wales	Radford 50	15.24	David Suttie	3:16:43:38
66	RF177	Joss	New South Wales	Johnstone J122	12.20	Roberto Camacho	3:16:53:18
67	7126	Llama II	New South Wales	Judel Vrolijk Dehler 46	14.00	Jon Linton	3:17:03:39
68	AUS3300	Transcendence Crento (TH)	New South Wales	Andrieu Jeanneau Sunfast 3300	10.00	Martin & John Cross	3:17:12:11
69	SM377	Bacardi	(Victoria (state)) Victoria	Peterson 44	13.34	Brett Averay	3:17:13:26
70	B40	Blink	New South Wales	Farr Beneteau First 40	12.20	Mark Gorbatov; Mark Siebert	3:17:39:43
71	SM888	Ciao Bella	New South Wales	Judel Vrolijk Hanse 505	15.00	Karl Onslow	3:18:11:42
72	33	Kraken 111 (TH)	Tasmania	Andrieu Jeanneau Sunfast 3300	10.00	Rob Gough; John Saul	3:18:18:25
73	0122	Rumchaser (TH)	New South Wales	Johnstone J122e	12.20	Andrew Butler; Lee Antill	3:18:18:25
74	8455	Esprit	Queensland	Berret Racoupeau Wauquiez C45	14.00	Roderick West	3:18:19:04
75	10447	Bowline	South Australia	Farr Beneteau First 44.7	13.40	Ian Roberts	3:18:20:02
76	20	Philosopher (TH)	New South Wales	Murray Burns Dovell Sydney 36 CR	11.30	David Henry; Stephen Prince	3:18:21:09
77	RQ3600	Mister Lucky (TH)	Queensland	Andrieu Jeanneau Sun Fast 3600	11.30	Rohan Wood; Todd Giraudo	3:18:26:25
78	6661	Crystal Cutter III	New South Wales	Farr Beneteau 40.7	11.90	Charles Parry-Okeden	3:18:39:15
79	RQ334	Fruit Salid 3	Queensland	Farr Beneteau First 40	12.60	Mark Drobitko	3:18:57:14
80	4343	Wild Oats	New South Wales	Farr 43	13.11	Brett Eagle	3:19:04:09
81	4966	King Billy	New South Wales	King Custom 38	11.50	Phil Bennett	3:19:12:04
82	6808	Flying Cloud	New South Wales	Farr Beneteau First 40	12.20	David Myers; George Martin	3:19:29:53
83	7551	Flying Fish Arctos	New South Wales	Radford McIntyre 55	15.36	Drew Hulton-Smith	3:20:48:31
84	B347	Speedwell (TH)	New South Wales	Farr Beneteau 34.7	10.26	Campbell Geeves; Wendy Tuck	3:21:10:47
85	ITA16054	Orione	Germany	Judel Vrolijk Grand Soleil 45	13.90	Axel & Peter Baumgartner	3:21:53:05
86	3430	White Bay 6 Azzurro	New South Wales	Sparkman & Stephens S&S 34	10.10	Shane Kearns	3:21:55:33
87	1808	Rum Rebellion (TH)	New South Wales	Johnstone J99	9.90	Shane Connelly; Tony Sutton	3:21:58:58
88	SA982	Inukshuk (TH)	South Australia	Kaufman Northshore 38	11.60	Robert Large; Cameron Boogaerdt	3:22:02:31
89	B47	Cyan Moon	(Victoria (state)) Victoria	Finot Beneteau Oceanis 473	14.30	Wayne Seaward	3:22:23:10
90	MYC8	Crux (TH)	New South Wales	Sparkman & Stephens S&S 34	10.10	Carlos Aydos; Peter Grayson	3:23:09:11
91	NZL6702	Silver Fern	Queensland	Bakewell-White Birdsall 72	21.30	David Hows	3:23:10:38
92	N5915	Uprising Brightside Marine (TH)	New South Wales	Lombard Jeanneau 36	10.90	Andrew & Harrison Miller	3:23:12:10
93	5930	Reve	New South Wales	Farr Beneteau 45F5	14.00	Kevin Whelan	3:23:15:19
94	38117	Anjo	Queensland	Farr Beneteau First 40	12.60	Clayton Craigie	4:00:17:30
95	AUS110	Blue Planet (TH)	New South Wales	Johnstone J99	9.90	Chris O'Neill; Larry Jamieson	4:00:21:43
96	4924	She	Queensland	Mull Olsen 40	12.00	Philip Bell	4:00:38:59
97	A19	Maluka	New South Wales	Gale Ranger 30	9.01	Peter Langman	4:02:39:16
98	GBR5672L	Salt Lines	New South Wales	Giles Shipwright 70	21.00	Matthew Harvey	4:03:39:42
99	3867	Gun Runner	New South Wales	King Jarkan 925	9.30	Chris Connelly	4:07:38:10
100	7374	Currawong (TH)	New South Wales	Joubert Currawong 30	9.10	Katherine Veel; Bridget Canham	5:10:42:06
DNF	2400	Avalanche (TH)	New South Wales	Hick 40	12.30	James Murchison; James Francis	Retired-Broken Bowsprit
DNF	FRA-9777	Eye Candy	New Caledonia	Murray Burns Dovell Sydney 38	11.80	Thierry Leseigneur	Retired-Forestay Damage
DNF	888	Huntress	Tasmania	Murray Burns Dovell Sydney 39 CR Mod	12.28	Victoria Logan	Retired-Loss of Rudder
DNF	52152	Koa	New South Wales	Farr TP52	15.90	Peter Wrigley; Andrew Kearnan	Retired-Loss of Rudder
DNF	5656	Mondo	New South Wales	Murray Burns Dovell Sydney 38	11.80	Lisa Callaghan; Stephen Teudt	Retired-Broken Gooseneck
DNF	0404	Navy One	New South Wales	Farr Beneteau First 40	12.20	Tori Costello; Nick Greenhill	Retired-Broken Boom
DNF	7709	Sail Exchange	New South Wales	Farr Cookson 12	12.00	Carl Crafoord	Retired-Loss of Rudder
DNF	SM1245	White Noise	(Victoria (state)) Victoria	Mills M.A.T. 1245	12.45	Daniel Edwards	Retired-Gear Failure
DNF	112	Yeah Baby	New South Wales	Lombard Akilaria RC2	12.00	Louis Ryckmans	Retired-Rudder Damage

Notes

^1 – Enterprise Next Generation were given a 120 minutes redress to be subtracted off their elapsed time under RRS 62 by the International Jury after their provided assistance to Koa who lost her rudder on the second day of the race.
^2 – XS Moment BNMH were given a 120 minutes penalty to be added onto their elapsed time by the International Jury due to breaching RRS Part 2 in a collision with Chutzpah at the start of the race in Sydney Harbour.
^3 – Gunshot were given a 40 minutes penalty to be added onto their elapsed time by the International Jury due to failing to maintain a continuous listening watch on the race radio frequencies for the duration of their race as required by Sailing Instruction 31.4 (Radio Transmissions).

=== Overall Handicap ===
Pos	Division	Sail Number	Yacht	State/Country	Yacht Type	LOA (Metres)	Skipper	Corrected time d:hh:mm:ss
1	1	9535	Celestial	New South Wales	Judel Vrolijk TP52	15.90	Sam Haynes	2:16:35:26
2	1	052	Gweilo	New South Wales	Judel Vrolijk TP52	15.90	Matt Donald; Chris Townsend	2:16:50:27
3	1	CAY52	Caro	New Zealand	Botin TP52	15.90	Max Klink	2:16:52:35
4	1	60564	Warrior Won	United States	Judel Vrolijk TP52	15.85	Chris Sheehan	2:17:01:24
5	1	52002	Quest	New South Wales	Farr TP52	15.85	Craig Neil	2:18:11:08
6	1	AUS52	Patrice	New South Wales	Botin TP52	15.90	Tony Kirby	2:18:54:22
7	2	F1701	Enterprise Next Gen	Western Australia	Botin Carkeek GP42	12.80	Anthony Kirke	2:19:14:27
8	0	AUS1	Moneypenny	New South Wales	Reichel Pugh 69	21.50	Sean Langman	2:19:33:59
9	1	6952	Smuggler	New South Wales	Judel Vrolijk TP52	15.90	Sebastian Bohm	2:19:42:34
10	0	52566	Alive	Tasmania	Reichel Pugh 66	20.10	Philip Turner; Duncan Hine	2:20:00:34
11	0	AUS72	URM Group	New South Wales	Reichel Pugh Maxi 72	21.80	Anthony Johnson	2:21:04:03
12	0	AUS 98888	No Limit	New South Wales	Reichel Pugh 63	19.20	David Gotze	2:21:04:48
13	1	52001	Zen	New South Wales	Botin TP52	15.90	Gordon Ketelbey	2:21:23:47
14	0	ITA70	Willow	New South Wales	Juan-K Volvo Open 70	21.50	Jim Cooney	2:21:27:28
15	0	AUS13	Whisper	New South Wales	Judel Vrolijk JV62	18.90	David Griffith	2:22:47:48
16	1	F0052	Crush	Western Australia	Judel Vrolijk TP52	15.90	David Davenport	2:23:44:23
17	0	525100	Black Jack	Queensland	Reichel Pugh RP100	30.48	Mark Bradford	2:23:50:55
19	0	SYD1000	LawConnect	New South Wales	Juan Yacht Design Juan-K 100	30.48	Christian Beck	2:23:58:36
19	0	CAY007	Andoo Comanche	New South Wales	Verdier VPLP 100 Supermaxi	30.48	John Winning, Jr.	3:01:34:58
20	0	10001	Hamilton Island Wild Oats	New South Wales	Reichel Pugh RP100	30.48	Mark Richards	3:01:41:35
21	2	A6	Alegria Republic	Queensland	Ker Sydney GTS 43	13.10	Rodney Jones	3:02:55:35
22	0	AUS80	Stefan Racing	Queensland	Botin 80	24.40	Grant Wharington	3:03:20:13
23	0	GBR2888L	Antipodes	Hong Kong	Santa Cruz 72	22.00	Geoffrey Hill	3:03:40:35
24	2	R33	Chutzpah	(Victoria (state)) Victoria	Reichel Pugh Caprice 40	12.35	Bruce Taylor	3:04:43:11
25	3	GBR888X	Sunrise	(United Kingdom) Great Britain	Valer JPK 11.80	11.80	Thomas Kneen	3:08:13:55
26	2	46	Khaleesi	New South Wales	Mills DK46	14.10	Rob Aldis; Sandy Farquharson	3:09:07:38
27	4	ST36	Midnight Rambler	Tasmania	Murray Burns Dovell Sydney 36	10.80	Ed Psaltis	3:09:26:28
28	2	545	Pretty Woman	New South Wales	Farr IC 45 Mod	13.80	Richard Hudson	3:10:17:34
29	4	1	Mistral (TH)	New South Wales	Lombard 34	10.58	Rupert Henry; Greg O'Shea	3:10:18:55
30	4	A140	Ariel	New South Wales	Farr Beneteau First 40	12.60	Ron Forster; Philip Damp	3:11:27:22
31	4	RQ3301	Sun Fast Racing (TH)	New South Wales	Andrieu Jeanneau Sunfast 3300	10.00	Lee Condell; Lincoln Dews	3:13:25:02
32	3	110	Pacman (TH)	Queensland	Young 11	11.00	Peter Elkington; Scott Cavanough	3:13:59:38
33	5	A19	Maluka	New South Wales	Gale Ranger 30	9.01	Peter Langman	3:14:19:22
34	3	7447	South Brittany	New South Wales	Farr Beneteau First 44.7	13.40	Tanguy Fournier Le Ray	3:14:40:47
35	3	D099	Kraken 42S	Tasmania	Farr Cookson 12	11.90	Mark Bayles; Andrew Sinclair	3:14:42:31
36	2	M16	Mayfair	Queensland	Rogers 46	14.00	James Irvine	3:14:49:47
37	5	3430	White Bay 6 Azzurro	New South Wales	Sparkman & Stephens S&S 34	10.10	Shane Kearns	3:15:21:04
38	5	MYC8	Crux (TH)	New South Wales	Sparkman & Stephens S&S 34	10.10	Carlos Aydos; Peter Grayson	3:16:01:00
39	1	52569	Denali	New South Wales	Judel Vrolijk TP52	15.90	Damian Parkes	3:16:29:09
40	3	99	KD4 (TH)	New South Wales	Judel Vrolijk Dehler 44	13.70	Joe de Kock; Richard Hooper	3:16:51:03
41	3	AUS7771	Z7	New South Wales	Beneteau First 45	13.70	Laurie McAllister	3:16:52:35
42	3	5038	Cinquante	New South Wales	Murray Burns Dovell Sydney 38	11.80	Kim Jaggar	3:16:54:20
43	4	7811	Hip-Nautic (TH)	Tasmania	Andrieu Jeanneau Sunfast 3300	10.10	Jean-Pierre Ravanat; Drew Meincke	3:17:05:15
44	2	AUS7742	Kialoa II	New South Wales	Sparkman & Stephens S&S 73 Yawl	23.00	Patrick & Keith Broughton	3:17:05:56
45	2	MH4	Toybox 2	New South Wales	Jeppesen XP44	13.30	Ian Box	3:17:13:15
46	2	1195	Quantock	New South Wales	Elliott 13 Mod	13.00	David Hobbs	3:17:16:50
47	5	4966	King Billy	New South Wales	King Custom 38	11.50	Phil Bennett	3:17:55:27
48	3	M25	Hasta la Vista	New South Wales	Murray Burns Dovell Sydney 38 OD	11.80	Jessica & Tom Grimes	3:17:59:01
49	4	6499	Supernova	New South Wales	Murray Burns Dovell Sydney 36	10.80	Alex Seja; Felicity Nelson	3:19:12:49
50	4	AUS3300	Transcendence Crento (TH)	New South Wales	Andrieu Jeanneau Sunfast 3300	10.00	Martin & John Cross	3:19:20:38
51	5	N5915	Uprising Brightside Marine (TH)	New South Wales	Lombard Jeanneau 36	10.90	Andrew & Harrison Miller	3:19:23:41
52	2	65007	Insomnia	New South Wales	Judel Vrolijk JV42	12.80	Marcus Grimes	3:19:35:29
53	2	424	Minnie (TH)	New South Wales	Jones 42	12.90	Michael & Oliver Bell	3:19:58:07
54	4	33	Kraken 111 (TH)	Tasmania	Andrieu Jeanneau Sunfast 3300	10.00	Rob Gough; John Saul	3:20:02:24
55	3	33	Kraken 111 (TH)	Tasmania	Andrieu Jeanneau Sunfast 3300	10.00	Rob Gough; John Saul	3:20:17:28
56	5	B347	Speedwell (TH)	New South Wales	Farr Beneteau 34.7	10.26	Campbell Geeves; Wendy Tuck	3:20:26:03
57	4	6841	Papillon	South Australia	Joubert Nivelt Archambault A40 RC	12.00	Dale Price	3:20:30:26
58	5	SA982	Inukshuk (TH)	South Australia	Kaufman Northshore 38	11.60	Robert Large; Cameron Boogaerdt	3:20:49:10
59	4	SM377	Bacardi	(Victoria (state)) Victoria	Peterson 44	13.34	Brett Averay	3:20:52:55
60	5	3867	Gun Runner	New South Wales	King Jarkan 925	9.30	Chris Connelly	3:20:57:42
61	3	E1	Jucasta	Western Australia	Briand Beneteau First 45	14.10	Stuart McIntyre	3:20:58:32
62	4	RQ3600	Mister Lucky (TH)	Queensland	Andrieu Jeanneau Sun Fast 3600	11.30	Rohan Wood; Todd Giraudo	3:21:30:55
63	2	B45	Rush	(Victoria (state)) Victoria	Farr 45	13.80	John Paterson	3:21:31:00
64	4	20	Philosopher (TH)	New South Wales	Murray Burns Dovell Sydney 36 CR	11.30	David Henry; Stephen Prince	3:22:03:25
65	3	YC110S	Sintara	South Australia	Farr Beneteau First 47.7	14.90	Derek Morrison	3:22:31:59
66	3	7779	Patrice Six	New South Wales	Jeppesen X-41	12.50	Alexander Flecknoe-Brown	3:22:54:45
67	2	A5	Hutchies Yeah Baby	Queensland	Welbourn 50	15.10	Andy Lamont	3:23:00:56
68	5	1808	Rum Rebellion (TH)	New South Wales	Johnstone J99	9.90	Shane Connelly; Tony Sutton	3:23:01:00
69	3	FRA6900	Poulpito	New Caledonia	Murray Burns Dovell Sydney 38	11.80	David Treguier	3:23:02:32
70	4	RF177	Joss	New South Wales	Johnstone J122	12.20	Roberto Camacho	3:23:06:38
71	2	11744	XS Moment BNMH	New South Wales	Jeppesen XP44	13.30	Ray Hudson	3:23:07:56
72	4	6661	Crystal Cutter III	New South Wales	Farr Beneteau 40.7	11.90	Charles Parry-Okeden	3:23:38:25
73	3	3810	Coopers	Queensland	Briand Jeanneau 53	16.10	Craig Watson	3:23:49:14
74	4	B40	Blink	New South Wales	Farr Beneteau First 40	12.20	Mark Gorbatov; Mark Siebert	4:00:23:12
75	4	0122	Rumchaser (TH)	New South Wales	Johnstone J122e	12.20	Andrew Butler; Lee Antill	4:00:59:23
76	4	RQ334	Fruit Salid 3	Queensland	Farr Beneteau First 40	12.60	Mark Drobitko	4:01:02:52
77	5	AUS110	Blue Planet (TH)	New South Wales	Johnstone J99	9.90	Chris O'Neill; Larry Jamieson	4:01:19:32
78	4	6808	Flying Cloud	New South Wales	Farr Beneteau First 40	12.20	David Myers; George Martin	4:02:43:35
79	3	10447	Bowline	South Australia	Farr Beneteau First 44.7	13.40	Ian Roberts	4:03:11:12
80	2	8300	Secret Mens Business	New South Wales	Murray Burns Dovell 42	12.80	David De Coster; Sally Armati	4:04:04:03
81	4	38117	Anjo	Queensland	Farr Beneteau First 40	12.60	Clayton Craigie	4:04:20:09
82	1	OC52	Ocean Crusaders J-Bird (TH)	Queensland	Andrews TP52	15.90	Ian & Annika Thomson	4:05:00:41
83	5	7374	Currawong (TH)	New South Wales	Joubert Currawong 30	9.10	Katherine Veel; Bridget Canham	4:16:55:34
DNF	3	FRA-9777	Eye Candy	New Caledonia	Murray Burns Dovell Sydney 38	11.80	Thierry Leseigneur	Retired-Forestay Damage
DNF	2	888	Huntress	Tasmania	Murray Burns Dovell Sydney 39 CR Mod	12.28	Victoria Logan	Retired-Loss of Rudder
DNF	1	52152	Koa	New South Wales	Farr TP52	15.90	Peter Wrigley; Andrew Kearnan	Retired-Loss of Rudder
DNF	3	5656	Mondo	New South Wales	Murray Burns Dovell Sydney 38	11.80	Lisa Callaghan; Stephen Teudt	Retired-Broken Gooseneck
DNF	4	0404	Navy One	New South Wales	Farr Beneteau First 40	12.20	Tori Costello; Nick Greenhill	Retired-Broken Boom
DNF	3	7709	Sail Exchange	New South Wales	Farr Cookson 12	12.00	Carl Crafoord	Retired-Loss of Rudder
DNF	2	SM1245	White Noise	(Victoria (state)) Victoria	Mills M.A.T. 1245	12.45	Daniel Edwards	Retired-Gear Failure
DNF	2	112	Yeah Baby	New South Wales	Lombard Akilaria RC2	12.00	Louis Ryckmans	Retired-Rudder Damage
