= Alfa Romeo (disambiguation) =

Alfa Romeo may refer to:

- Alfa Romeo, an Italian car manufacturer
- Alfa Romeo I, a 2002 yacht
- Alfa Romeo II, a 2005 yacht
- Alfa Romeo III, a 2008 yacht
