= Audi MedCup =

Sailing Competition last held in 2011

- First held: 2005
- Last held: 2012
- Classes: TP 52, Soto 40
- Champion: (United States) Quantum Racing
- Website: http://www.medcup.org

The Audi MedCup was a sailing competition which began in 2005 and turned into the world's leading regatta circuit. The event was last held in 2011.

It was sailed in the TP 52 and Soto 40 classes (previously the GP42 class in 2009–2010).

The circuit, which was sponsored by the German car manufacturer Audi, ran annually throughout Southern Europe and attracted some of the best sailors in the world. The five-regatta circuit lasted five months starting in May and culminated in September.

The circuit was based on a box rule where every boat, in theory, had a similar design. This left it to the skill of the sailors to decide the winner, much like Formula One. There is some leverage in the rule in that deck layouts can be adjusted and sails can be crafted differently but the main design features such as weight, beam, and mast height and sail area are restricted to this "box rule" standard.

While originally sailed only on TP 52s, the Audi MedCup in 2009 became a two class regatta with the introduction of the GP42 class. In 2011 the GP42 was replaced as the second class by the One Design Soto 40.

It costs roughly 2.5 million Euros to build a brand new TP52 on which to race, and an additional five hundred thousand to one million Euros for sails and deck gear. This plus the added cost of maintaining the yacht and running a professional sailing campaign made the Audi MedCup one of the most expensive sailing circuits in the world.

== 2010 Audi MedCup Circuit ==
| Date | Regatta | Location |
|---|---|---|
| 11–16 May 2010 | Portugal Trophy | Cascais, Portugal |
| 15–20 June 2010 | Marseille Trophy | Marseille, France |
| 20–25 July 2010 | Camper regatta Conde de Godó Trophy Barcelona | Barcelona, Spain |
| 24–29 August 2010 | Caja Mediterráneo Region of Murcia Trophy | Cartagena, Spain |
| 20–25 September 2010 | Region of Sardinia Trophy | Cagliari, Italy |

== 2011 Audi MedCup Circuit ==
| Date | Regatta | Location |
|---|---|---|
| 17–21 May 2011 | Portugal Trophy | Cascais, Portugal |
| 14–19 June 2011 | Marseille Trophy | Marseille, France |
| 19–24 July 2011 | Region of Sardinia Trophy | Cagliari, Italy |
| 23–28 August 2011 | Region of Murcia Trophy | Cartagena, Spain |
| 12–17 September 2011 | Barcelona Trophy | Barcelona, Spain |
