= ORC World Championship =

Yacht Racing World Championship

The ORC World Championship is an annual international sailing regatta for performance yachts rated under the ORCi rating system, organized by the host club on behalf of the Offshore Racing Congress and recognized by World Sailing, the sports IOC recognized governing body. Before 2008 the event was competed under the ORC old IMS measurement system and known as the ORC IMS World Championships.

== Editions ==
Event			Host			Sailors			No Boats				Ref.
Ed.	Date	Year	Host club	Location	Nat.	Comp.	Nats	Cont.	0	A	B	C	Ref.
1	20–28 Jun	2008		Athens	Greece				-				
2	5–11 Jul	2009		Brindisi	Italy				-				
3	5–12 Sep	2010		Flensburg	Germany				-	19	30	-	
4	18–25 Jun	2011		Cres	Croatia				-	56	63	-	
5	4–11 Aug	2012		Helsinki	Finland				-	47	77	-	
6	21–29 Jun	2013		Ancona	Italy				-	53	53	-	
7	1–9 Aug	2014	Kieler Yacht-Club	Kiel	Germany				-	27	57	66	
8	27 Jun – 4 Jul	2015	Real Club Náutico de Barcelona	Barcelona	Spain				-	23	38	35	
9	15–23 Jul	2016	Royal Danish Yacht Club & Egaa Sailing Club	Skovshoved	Denmark				-				
10	30 Jun – 8 Jul	2017	Yacht Club Porto San Rocco	Trieste	France				-				
11	12–20 Aug	2018	Jachtclub Scheveningen	The Hague	Netherlands				-				
12	31 May – 8 Jun	2019		Šibenik	Croatia				-				
N/A		2020	New York Yacht Club, Newport	Newport	United States				-				
13	6–14 Aug	2021	Kalev Yacht Club	Tallinn	Estonia				-	8	34	62	
14	22–30 June	2022	Yacht Club Costa Smeralda	Porto Cervo	Italy				-	20	27	22	
15	4–12 Aug	2023	Kieler Yacht-Club	Kiel	Germany				-				
16		2024	New York Yacht Club, Newport	Newport, RI	United States				6	19	14	-	
17	8–16 Aug	2025	Kalev Yacht Club	Tallinn	Estonia				8	-	22	34	

== Winners ==
Year	Class 0	Class A	Class B	Class C	Ref.
2009	N/A	GRE44GS (2) - MELITI IV; GRAND SOLEIL 42R; George Andreadis (GRE)	ITA15911 (49) - LOW NOISE; M37; GIUFFRE' GIUSEPPE (ITA)	N/A	
2010	N/A	GER 5355 - Beluga Sailing Team; Rodman 42; Christian Plump (GER)	GER 5533 - patent 3 X-Yachts X-332 Sport; Jürgen Klinghardt (GER)		
2011	N/A	ITA 40091 - Enfant Terrible; Farr 40; Alberto Rossi (ITA)	ITA 15911 - Low Noise; M37; Duccio Colombi (ITA)	N/A	
2012	N/A	ITA 40091 - Enfant Terrible; Farr 40; Alberto Rossi (ITA)	ITA 16639 - Scugnizza; NM 38S; Vincenzo De Blasio (ITA)	N/A	
2013	N/A	ITA 2352 - HURAKAN; TP52 - 2008' Reichel-Pugh / Oracle; Marco Serafini (ITA)	ITA 16639 - SCUGNIZZA; NM38S; Vincenzo De Blasio (ITA)	N/A	
2014		ITA 29141 - Enfant Terrible; TP52 - 2008 Judel-Vrolijk / Cooksons NZL; Alberto Rossi (ITA)	EST 475 - Forte; X-41; Jaak Jögi (EST)	ITA 15911 - Low Noise; M37; Duccio Colombi (ITA)	
2015		ITA29141 - ENFANT TERRIBLE MINOAN LINES; TP52 - 2008 Judel-Vrolijk / Cooksons NZL; Alberto Rossi (ITA)	ROU1 - MOVISTAR; ClubSwan 42; Pedro Campos (ESP)	ITA998 - LOW NOISE II; ITALIA 9.98 F DUCCIO COLOMBI (ITA)	
2016		Freccia Rossa; TP52; Vadim Yakimenko	Santa; Landmark 43; Claus Landmark	Bach Yachting; Italia 9.98 F Jascha Bach	
2017		Mascalzone Latino; Cookson 50; Vincenzo Onorato (ITA)	Be Wild; ClubSwan 42; Renzo Grottesi; Club Vela Porto Civitanova	Airis; Melges 32 mod. Roberto Monti; Circolo Velico Il Porto di Mare	
2018		Team Beau Geste; Botin 52; Karl Kwok (HKG); Royal Hong Kong Yacht Club	Santa; Landmark 43; Claus Landmark	J Lance 12; J/112E; Gideon Messink	
2019		Xio; Optimised TP 52; Marco Serafini	Selene; ClubSwan 42; Massimo de Campo	Sugar 3 Italia Yachts 11.98; Sandro Montefusco; Ott Kikkas	
2021		Halbtrocken 4.5; Mills 45 Custom; Michael Berghorn	Essentia 44; Grand Soleil 44P; Catalin Trandafir	Matilda 4 J/112E; Juss Ojala	
2022		GER 8045 (5) - HALBTROCKEN 4.5 MILLS 45 CUSTOM; Michael Berghorn (GER)	ROU 1044 (18) - ESSENTIA44 GRAND SOLEIL 44P; Catalin Trandafir (ROU)	EST-112 (60) - MATILDA 4 J/Boats J-112E; Juss Ojala (EST)	
2023		CHN 1997 (7)- BEAU GESTE; TP 52 Karl Kwok (HKG); Gavin Brady (USA); David Brooke; Nathan Ellis (AUS); David Swete (NZL); Chris Cowan (CAN); Matthew Humphries (GBR); Ryan Houston (NZL); Edward Davison (GBR); Samual Bell; Nick Blackman (NZL); David Lenz (GBR); Simon Daubney (NZL); Max South (NZL); George Bridge (GBR)	POL 1044 (37) - WINDWHISPER44 Grand Soleil 44 P Marcin Sutkowski (POL); Robert Gwozdz (POL); Joan Navarro Guiu (ESP); Afonso Domingos (POR); Hugo Rocha (POR); Piotr Przybylski (POL); Kacper Gwozdz (POL); Mateusz Gwozdz (POL); Stanislaw Bajerski (POL); Aksel Magdhal (NOR)	EST 792 (68) - SUGAR 3 Italia 11.98; Sandro Montefusco (ITA); Paolo Bucciarelli (ITA); Matteo Polli (ITA); Matteo Ivaldi (ITA); Maurizio Loberto (ITA); Siim Ots (EST); Marjaliisa Umb (EST); Karl-Robert Trink (EST); Ott Kikkas (EST)	
2024	USA 55052 - FOX 2.0 Botin 52; Victor Wild (USA); Nacho Postigo (ESP); Kelvin Harrap (NZL); Scott Nixon (USA); Chris Hosking (AUS); Andy Horton (USA); Lucas Chapman (AUS); Santiago Lange (ARG); Artie Means (USA); Aidan Naughton (USA); Cooper Dressler (USA); Jareese Finch (ANT); Orrin Starr (USA); Maciel Cicchetti (ITA); Dean Curtis (AUS); Graham Post (USA); Harry West (GBR)	INTERLODGE 44 USA 4415 Botin 44; Austin Fragomen (USA); Gwen Fragomen (USA)	POL 1044 - WIND WHISPER 44; Grand Soleil 44P Hugo Rocha (POR); Marcin Sutkowski (POL); Stanislaw Bajerski (POL); Mateusz Gwózdz (POL); Aksel Magdahl (NOR); Joan Navarro (ESP); Piotr Przybylski (POL); Kacper Gwózdz (POL)		
2025	SWE41 RAN; Carkeek 40+ Niklas Zennström (SWE) Adrian Stead (GBR); Tim Powell (GBR); Steve Hayles (GBR); Justin Slattery (IRL); Toby Iles (GBR); Thomas Kiff (NZL); Griffin Spinney (USA); Joy Fitzgerald (GBR); Mark Lees (GBR)		DEN 1 - FORMULA X X-Yachts / XR 41; Jeppe Borch (DEN) Jesper Radich (DEN); Gonzalo Araújo (ESP); Rasmus Taatø (DEN); Thor Malthe Andersen (DEN); Matias Rossing (DEN); Enrico Turin (ITA); Gustav Schwennesen (DEN); Mads Christian Taatø (DEN); Ross Vickers (AUS)	SWE 88; Beneteau First 36.7 Mod. Patrik Forsgren (SWE) Emil Forsgren (SWE); Zacharias Krafft (SWE); Alvina Johansson (FIN); Claudia Söderberg (SWE); Sam Stenman (FIN); Thomas Tennström (FIN); Noa Bergstran (SWE)	
2026	USA 520 - SUMMER STORM; TP 52 Mod. Andrew Berdon (USA)	SWE41 - RAN; Carkeek 40+ Niklas Zennstrom (SWE)	KATARA ARG-5900; PG390; Julian Somodi (ARG); Yacht Club Argentino	ITA-211 - ROBE DA MAT; Mat-11; Luigi Buzzi (ITA); C.N.Celle	
