= TP 52 =

Class of racing yacht

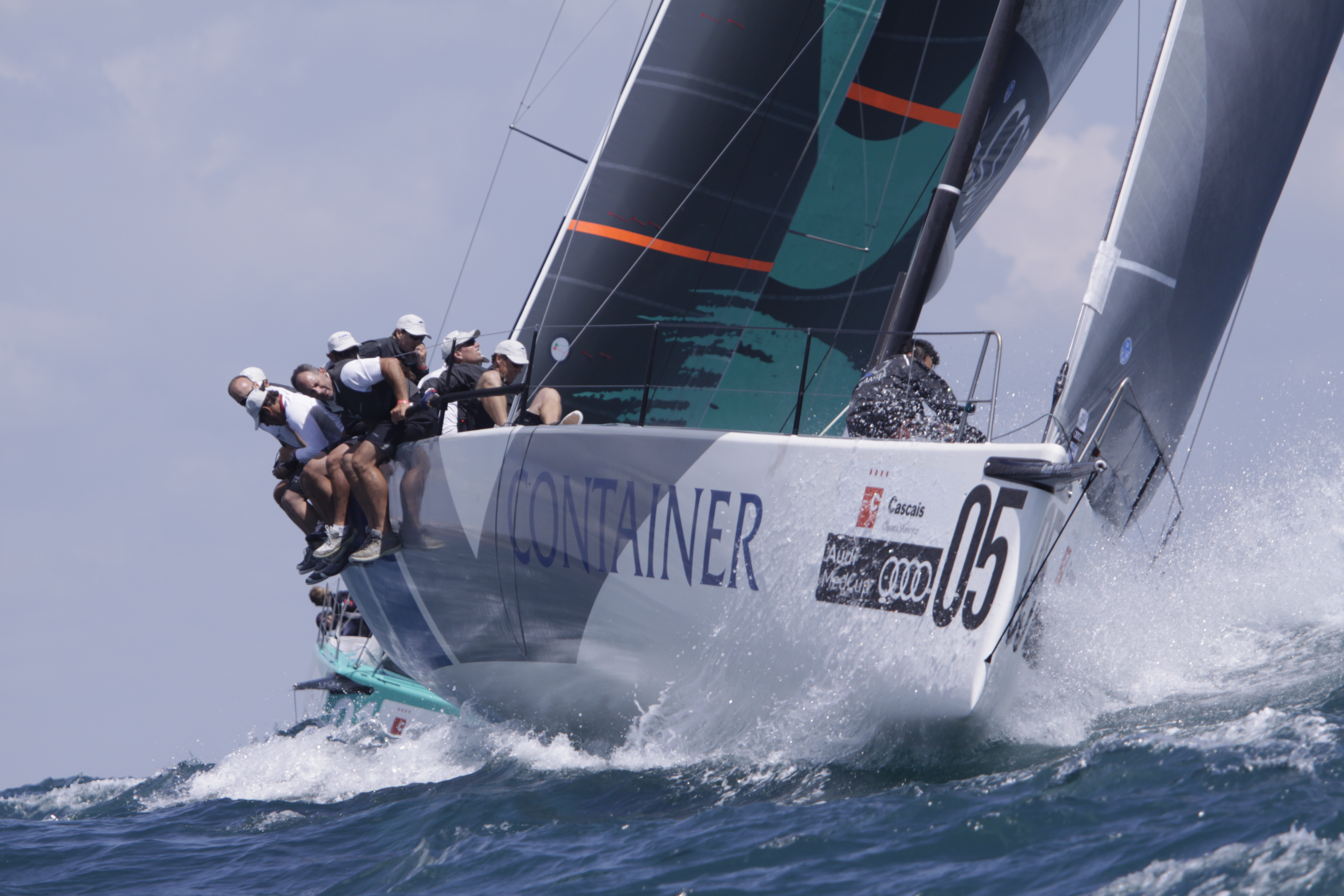
- TP52 Container at the Audi MedCup races in Cascais, 2011

Hull
- LOA: 15.85 m (52 ft 0 in)

The Transpac 52 (TP52) is a class of yacht used for competitive 52 Super Series yacht racing, and the Audi MedCup previously, besides the world championship of the class. The class is recognised by the International Sailing Federation which entitles the class to hold an Official World Championships.

== History ==
The TP52 Class started in 2001 and steadily grew over the years, gaining ISAF recognition in 2007, to a fully member controlled class with a set of bylaws, an annual meeting, an executive committee made up out of the members and a class president who also has to be a member.

The original intention was to provide a yacht capable for both inshore and offshore sailing specifically the Transpacific Yacht Race. However, with the decline in IMS racing, the class became popular in Europe. A professional inshore tour was established for Europe called the MedCup. Recent (2022–23) rule changes help keep the class at the forefront of competitive racing.

Several Americas Cup teams have used the class to hone race skills in a competitive fleet, including Oracle Team USA (2008-2009), Emirates Team New Zealand (2009-2010), Artemis Racing (2007-2010) and Luna Rossa (2010, 2018), each with their own entries, as well as Land Rover BAR (2018) and American Magic (2023-2025) partnering with the Gladiator and Quantum Racing teams respectively.

== The Box Rule ==
TP52 boats are built and sailed to a set of rules which established the original design as a 'box' rule – where the boat must fit within a notional box of specified dimensions. The current rules specify a single masted, fixed keel mono-hull with a bowsprit and a single rudder, with maximum hull length of 15.85 metres (52 ft), beam width of 4.3 metres (14 ft), keel draft of 3.5 metres (11 ft) and spinnaker hoist height of 22.4 metres (73 ft), along with a minimum total weight of 6,975 kilograms (15,377 lb) and maximum keel bulb weight of 3,800 kilograms (8,400 lb).

== Events ==
=== Global Championship ===
The unofficial World Championship was held before it got international status and were the keystone of the formation of the class.

Event	Gold	Silver	Bronze
2006 Miami	Patches (IRL); Eamon Conneely	Pegasus 52 (USA); Philippe Kahn	Beau Geste (CHN); Kark Kwok
2007 Porto Cervo	Artemis Racing (SWE); Torbjorn Tornqvist	Patches (IRL); Eamon Conneely	Mean Machine (MON); Peter de Ridder

=== European Series ===
The competition changed the nature of the class with it becoming a pinnacle inshore/coastal event for grand prix monohulled yacht racing. The series started off as the MedCup from 2005 to 2011 before evolving in the 52 Super Series.

=== Offshore Events ===
TP 52s or optimized direct derivatives have won the overall trophy in most of the classic offshore events while racing under the major international handicap systems. Notable results include:

Race	Distance	Category	Boat name	Skipper	Elapsed time	Notes
2003 Transpac Race	2,225 nm	1st overall	Alta Vita	Bill Turpin (USA)	7d 12h 20m 29s	Another TP 52, Beau Geste, came 2nd overall.
2004 Newport Bermuda Race	635 nm	1st overall	Rosebud	Roger Sturgeon (USA)	2d 20h 24m 43s	
2004 Chicago to Mackinac	333 nm	1st overall	Esmeralda	Makoto Uematsu; Ken Read (USA)	1d 17h 5m	
2005 Transpac Race	2,225 nm	1st overall	Rosebud	Roger Sturgeon (USA)	8d 16h 25m 4s	TP 52s came 1st, 2nd and 3rd overall.
2005 Fastnet Race	608 nm	2nd overall	Patches	Ian Walker (GBR)	2d 2h 17m 48s	
2006 Hong Kong to Vietnam Race	673 nm	1st overall	Island Fling	Paul Winkelmann (IRE)	2d 0h 16m 5s	
2009 Gotland Runt	352 nm	1st overall	Rán	Niklas Zennström (SWE)		
2010 Cowes-Dinard-St Malo	151 nm	1st overall	John Merricks II	Luke McCarthy (GBR)	21h 24m 03s	Another TP 52, Paprec Recyclage, finished 39 seconds later.
2010 Gotland Runt	352 nm	1st overall	Fram XVI	King Harald V (NOR)	1d 23h 59m 39s	
2010 Sevenstar Round Britain and Ireland Race	1,805 nm	4th overall /2nd in class	John Merricks II	Luke McCarthy (GBR)	8d 11h 49m 23s	British Keelboat Academy's youth team entry led overall in the opening stages of the race.
2010 Middle Sea Race	606 nm	1st overall	Lucky	Bryon Ehrhart (USA)	3d 3h 16m 25s	
2011 Gotland Runt	352 nm	1st overall	Datacom-Lindahl	Ralf Aspholm (GER)		
2012 Hong Kong to Hainan Race	355 nm	1st overall	Freefire	Sam Chan (HKG)	1d 4h 43m 54s	
2013 Hong Kong to Vietnam Race	673 nm	1st overall	Lucky	Bryon Ehrhart (USA)	2d 2h 22m 44s	
2013 Fastnet Race	608 nm	1st in class	Pace	Johnny Vincent (GBR)	2d 21h 15m 7s	
2014 China Sea Race	565 nm	2nd overall	Lucky	Bryon Ehrhart (USA)	2d 21h 45m 22s	
2016 Victoria to Maui	2,308 nm	1st overall	Kinetic V	David Sutcliffe (CAN)	8d 14h 16m 46s	Another TP52, Valkyrie, took line honours and set a race record of 8d 9h 17m 50s.
2017 Sydney to Hobart	628 nm	1st overall	Ichi Ban	Matt Allen (AUS)	1d 19h 10m 20s	
2019 Hong Kong to Vietnam Race	673 nm	1st overall	Freefire	Sam Chan (HKG)	2d 0h 27m 55s	
2019 Sydney to Hobart	628 nm	1st overall	Ichi Ban	Matt Allen (AUS)	2d 6h 18m 5s	
2020 Caribbean 600	600 nm	1st overall	Outsider	Bo Teichmann (GER)	2d 19h 41m 40s	
2021 Sydney to Hobart	628 nm	1st overall	Ichi Ban	Matt Allen (AUS)	3d 3h 42m 29s	Another TP 52, Celestial, came 2nd overall.
2022 Sydney to Hobart	628 nm	1st overall	Celestial	Sam Haynes (AUS)		TP 52 also came 2,3,4,5

=== Coastal Races ===
Race	Category	Boat name	Skipper	Notes
2016 Round the Island Race	1st Overall	GBR 11152 - Gladiator	Bernard Langley	

=== Pinnacle Inshore Events ===
Race	Category	Boat name	Skipper	Notes
2013 ORCi World Championships - Class A	1st	Hurakan	Marco Serafini	
2014 ORCi World Championships - Class A	1st	Enfant Terrible	Alberto Rossi	
2015 ORCi World Championships - Class A	1st	Enfant Terrible	Alberto Rossi	
2016 ORCi World Championships - Class A	1st	Freccia Rossa	Vadim Yakimenko	
2018 ORCi World Championships - Class A	1st	Beau Geste	Karl Kwok (HKG)	
2019 ORCi World Championships - Class A	1st	Xio	Marco Serafini (ITA)	
2022 ORCi World Championships - Class A	1st	Beau Geste	Karl Kwok (HKG)	
2023 ORCi World Championships - Class A	1st	Beau Geste	Karl Kwok (HKG)	
2024 ORCi World Championships - Class 0	1st	Fox 2.0	Victor Wild (USA)	
2026 ORCi World Championships - Class 0	1st	Summer Storm	Andrew Berdon (USA)	
