= Edward Psaltis =

Ed Psaltis
- Born: 4 July 1961; Sydney
- Education: Newington College; University of New South Wales
- Occupations: Accountant yachtsman
- Parent(s): Bill and Margaret Psaltis

Edward (Ed) McDonald Psaltis (born 7 April 1961 in Sydney) is an Australian ocean-racing skipper and yachtsman.

== Early years ==
Psaltis was a junior sailor with the Hunters Hill Sailing Club and sailed in his first Sydney to Hobart as a 17-year-old. He was educated at Newington College (1973–1978) and the University of New South Wales.

== Sailing ==
Psaltis won first place overall, aboard AFR Midnight Rambler, in the storm-ravaged 1998 Sydney to Hobart Yacht Race. As a sailor he has represented Australia in the Sardinia Cup and the Southern Cross Cup. Psaltis has twice been the overall winner of the Sydney–Mooloolaba Race in the 30-footer, Nuzulu In 1999 he won the Gosford–Lord Howe Island Race with AFR Midnight Rambler, only the second yacht to win both the Hobart and Lord Howe Island races (Australia's only annual Category 1 ocean races). In 2000 he was voted NSW Yachtsman of the Year.

== Private life ==
Psaltis is a self-employed accountant based in Hobart.
