= Alfa Romeo III =

- Other names: Shockwave
- Designer(s): Reichel/Pugh
- Builder: McConaghy; Sydney, Australia
- Launched: 2008
- Owner(s): Neville Crichton; George Sakellaris

Racing career
- Skippers: Torben Grael
- Notable victories: 2014 Bermuda Race (l.h.)

Specifications
- Type: Monohull
- Length: 21.80 m (71.5 ft) (LH)
- Beam: 5.41 m (17.7 ft)
- Draft: 5.12 m (16.8 ft)

Alfa Romeo III (also known as Shockwave) is a 21-metre (69 ft) "mini-maxi" built to compete with other boats of the same size in shorter distance races under IRC rules.

As Alfa Romeo I and Alfa Romeo II, she was also designed by Reichel/Pugh and built by McConaghy Boats; Her 31.5-metre (103 ft) mast was also built by Southern Spars. She has a conventional fixed bulb keel and was launched in mid-2008. Her interior design is styled after the Alfa Romeo 8C Competizione, in red, silver/gray, black and white, with a companionway ladder which resembles the car's grille. Rated as an IRC Mini Maxi, she displaces about 14,700 kilograms (32,400 lb). The IRC Mini Maxi division accommodates yachts between 60 and 79 feet (18 and 24 m) LOA. In September 2008, she was twice first to finish in Maxi Yacht Rolex Cup competition, with Torben Grael skippering.

Though her LOA is about 9 metres (30 ft) shorter than Alfa Romeo II, her beam is comparable, to enhance stiffness, or resistance to heeling, and she carries a long bowsprit from which she sets an asymmetrical spinnaker. With this "mini-Maxi" Crichton sought closer competition on the race course. He noted that with only perhaps ten of the supermaxi yachts (potential competitors of Alfa Romeo II) in existence, getting them all on the same race course at the same time had been difficult. The more affordable mini-Maxi engages more competition in stronger fleets. She has since been bought by George Sakellaris.

Shockwave took line honors by completing the 635 nm 2014 Bermuda Race in a time of time was 63h 04m 11s. The win adds to Shockwave's list of victories, including a division win in the 2012 Bermuda Race, the 2013 Montego Bay, and the 2014 RORC Caribbean 600 Race.

== Sponsorship ==
Alfa Romeo III was sponsored by Alfa Romeo Automobiles S.p.A. of Turin, Italy. They own the Alfa Romeo name and other intellectual properties such as logos, emblems (used on Alfa Romeo III), and manner of depicting the name as shown on the mainsail of Alfa Romeo II in the infobox.

== See also ==
- Alfa Romeo I
- Alfa Romeo II
- Wild Oats XI
