= 2018 Sydney to Hobart Yacht Race =

2018 annual yacht race in Australia

74th Sydney to Hobart Yacht Race
Event information
- Type: Yacht
- Dates: 26–31 December 2018
- Sponsor: Rolex
- Host city: Sydney, Hobart
- Boats: 85
- Distance: 628 nautical miles (1,163 km)
- Website: Website archive

Results
- Winner (2018): Wild Oats XI (Mark Richards)

Succession
- Previous: LDV Comanche (Jim Cooney) in 2017
- Next: Comanche (Jim Cooney & Samantha Grant) in 2019

The 2018 Sydney to Hobart Yacht Race was the 74th annual running of the Sydney to Hobart Yacht Race. Hosted by the Cruising Yacht Club of Australia and sponsored by Rolex, it began at Sydney Harbour at 13:00 on 26 December 2018, before heading south for 628 nautical miles (1,163 km) via the Tasman Sea, Bass Strait, Storm Bay and up the River Derwent, to cross the finish line in Hobart, Tasmania. This race marked the 20 year anniversary of the 1998 Sydney to Hobart Yacht Race, when 6 sailors died due to severe weather.

A fleet of 85 boats contested the race and 79 finished. Line honours were claimed by Wild Oats XI in a time of 1 day, 19 hours, 17 minutes and 21 seconds. The Tattersall's Cup went to Alive (Duncan Hine), the first Tasmanian boat to win handicap since 1979.

== Results ==
=== Line Honours ===
Pos	Sail Number	Yacht	State/Country	Yacht Type	LOA (Metres)	Skipper	Elapsed time d:hh:mm:ss
1	10001	Wild Oats XI	New South Wales	Reichel Pugh RP100	30.48	Mark Richards	1:19:07:21
2	525100	Black Jack	Queensland	Reichel Pugh 100	30.48	Peter Harburg; Mark Bradford	1:19:35:06
3	AUS12358	Comanche	New South Wales	Verdier VPLP 100 Supermaxi	30.48	Jim Cooney; Samantha Grant	1:19:36:09
4	SYD 1000	Infotrack	New South Wales	Juan Yacht Design Juan-K 100	30.48	Christian Beck; Joe Akacich	1:19:49:31
5	52566	Alive	Tasmania	Reichel Pugh 66	20.10	Philip Turner; Duncan Hine	2:01:40:36
6	7001	Wild Oats X	New South Wales	Reichel Pugh 66	20.10	Stacey Jackson	2:01:53:15
7	USA6066	Prospector	United States	Mills 68	20.80	Terrence Glackin	2:05:15:14
8	AUS98888	Voodoo	(Victoria (state)) Victoria	Reichel Pugh 63	19.20	Hugh Ellis	2:05:17:35
9	AUS01	Winning Appliances	New South Wales	Carkeek 60	18.30	John Winning Jr.	2:06:15:18
10	AUS001	Ichi Ban	New South Wales	Botin TP 52	15.85	Matt Allen	2:10:11:14
11	AUS1	Naval Group	New South Wales	Reichel Pugh 69	21.50	Sean Langman	2:11:14:07
12	AUS03	Noahs II	China	Jones Volvo Open 70	21.50	Ting Lee	2:11:15:22
13	AUS8899	Hollywood Boulevard	New South Wales	Farr 55	16.80	Ray Roberts	2:11:34:07
14	USA50009	Privateer	United States	Farr Cookson 50	15.25	Ron O'Hanley; Scott Innes-Jones	2:12:41:18
15	RQ0052	Envy Scooters	Queensland	Judel Vrolijk TP 52	15.85	Barry Cuneo	2:14:32:55
16	6952	Celestial	New South Wales	Judel Vrolijk TP 52	15.85	Sam Haynes	2:15:18:04
17	052	Gweilo	New South Wales	Judel Vrolijk TP52	15.90	Matt Donald; Chris Townsend	2:15:33:58
18	6377	Triton	New South Wales	Lyons-Cawse LC60	18.30	Michael Cranitch; David Gotze	2:17:49:51
19	52152	Koa	New South Wales	Farr TP 52	15.85	Peter Wrigley; Andrew Kearnan	2:17:59:09
20	AUS70	Ragamuffin	New South Wales	Farr TP 52	15.85	Brenton Fischer	2:18:22:21
21	FRA8668	Teasing Machine	France	Nivelt Muratet NMYD 54	16.50	Eric de Turckheim	2:18:29:17
22	GBR5211L	Frantic	New South Wales	Donovan TP 52	15.85	Michael Martin	2:19:14:47
23	5200	Bush Paul Group	New South Wales	Farr TP 52	15.85	Mathew Short	2:19:17:15
24	S777	Primitive Cool	(Victoria (state)) Victoria	Reichel Pugh RP51	15.61	John Newbold	2:19:20:56
25	360	Patrice	New South Wales	Ker 46	13.90	Tony Kirby	2:19:21:40
26	421	Smuggler	New South Wales	Rogers 46	14.00	Sebastian Bohm	2:22:27:58
27	HKG2384	Apsaras	Hong Kong	Reichel Pugh Advanced A80	24.00	Li Jian; Travis Read	2:23:27:33
28	R33	Chutzpah	(Victoria (state)) Victoria	Reichel Pugh Caprice 40	12.35	Bruce Taylor	3:00:11:11
29	6686	St Jude	New South Wales	Murray Burns Dovell Sydney 47	14.20	Noel Cornish	3:00:17:18
30	6953	PYR Jarhead Wot Eva	New South Wales	Nelson Marek TP 52	15.85	Greg Nasmyth	3:00:21:58
31	B330	Hartbreaker	(Victoria (state)) Victoria	Reichel Pugh 46	14.20	Tony & Gaye Walton	3:00:41:47
32	8338	Showtime	New South Wales	Ker 40	12.20	Mark Griffith	3:00:45:33
33	F1701	Enterprise	Western Australia	Farr 40	12.40	Anthony Kirke	3:02:24:58
34	099	Grace O'Malley	New South Wales	Farr Cookson 12	11.90	Zoe Taylor	3:02:37:39
35	AUS7742	Kialoa II	New South Wales	Sparkman & Stephens S&S 73 Yawl	23.00	Patrick Broughton	3:04:43:55
36	AUS070	URM	New South Wales	Farr 50	15.50	Adrian Dunphy	3:05:43:34
37	7709	SailExchange	New South Wales	Farr Cookson 12	12.00	Carl Crafoord; Tim Horkings	3:06:36:10
38	GER7475	Lunatix	Germany	Jeppesen XP50	15.00	Friedrich Boehnert	3:06:52:47
39	CAY6536	Oroton Drumfire	New South Wales	Hoek TC78	24.00	Phillip Neal	3:07:05:53
40	G4646R	Extasea	(Victoria (state)) Victoria	Mills DK46	14.00	Paul Buchholz	3:07:11:04
41	MH46	Kayimai	New South Wales	Humphreys Azuree 46	14.00	Rob Aldis	3:07:43:10
42	262	Helsal 3	New South Wales	Adams 20	20.00	David Stephenson	3:08:15:26
43	33345	Black Sheep	New South Wales	Briand Beneteau 45	13.70	Matthew Pilkington; Rob Gourlay	3:08:17:02
44	6419	Pekljus	New South Wales	Radford 50	15.24	David Suttie	3:08:48:52
45	5038	Cinquante	New South Wales	Murray Burns Dovell Sydney 38	11.80	Kim Jaggar	3:10:05:28
46	RF9095	Dare Devil	New South Wales	Farr Cookson 47	14.30	Sibby Ilzhofer	3:10:10:28
47	6836	Anger Management	Western Australia	J&J Salona 44	13.40	Tim Stewart	3:10:20:59
48	248	Wax Lyrical	New South Wales	Jeppesen X50	15.20	Les Goodridge	3:10:23:17
49	41	Matrix	Queensland	Jeppesen X41	12.60	Graham Furtado	3:11:04:03
50	07	Wings	New South Wales	Judel Vrolijk Dehler 46	14.00	Ian Edwards	3:11:06:47
51	6396	Sports Bar	New South Wales	Farr Beneteau 47.7	14.30	Neville Blair; Greg Mason	3:11:12:58
52	MH60	TSA Management	New South Wales	Murray Burns Dovell Sydney 38	11.80	Tony Levett	3:11:34:03
53	6723	Allegro	New South Wales	Warwick 67	20.30	Adrian Lewis	3:11:48:10
54	6841	Papillon	New South Wales	Joubert Nivelt Archambault A40 RC	12.00	Phil Molony	3:13:56:49
55	6755	Ausreo	New South Wales	Farr Beneteau 47.7	14.00	Ian Creek	3:14:08:13
56	RUS1	SeaVentus Mahligai	Russia	Murray Burns Dovell Sydney 46	14.30	Murray Owen; Jenny Kings	3:14:11:14
57	6559	Wots Next	New South Wales	Murray Burns Dovell Sydney 47	14.20	Charles Cupit	3:14:28:19
58	ESP6100	Duende	New South Wales	Judel Vrolijk TP 52	15.39	Damien Parkes	3:14:30:45
59	SM400	Avalanche	(Victoria (state)) Victoria	Hick 40	12.30	Gary Fisher; Andrew McGrath; Chris Auger	3:16:29:18
60	89	Joy Ride	United States	Johnstone J122e	12.19	John Murkowski	3:16:49:01
61	W1424	Mayfair	Queensland	Farr Beneteau First 40	12.20	James Irvine	3:17:17:30
62	ST36	Midnight Rambler	New South Wales	Murray Burns Dovell Sydney 36	10.80	Ed Psaltis	3:17:45:54
63	1986	Trumpcard	Queensland	Van de Stadt 44	13.31	Blake Boulton	3:18:32:10
64	1545	Dreki Sunnan	New South Wales	Briand Beneteau First 45	13.60	Ken Holmes	3:23:59:52
65	6774	Jackpot	New South Wales	Johnstone J122	12.20	Robert Hale; Matt Gooden	4:00:24:15
66	2001	Quetzalcoatl	New South Wales	Jones 40	12.33	Anthony Bruce; James Lee-Warner; Antony Sweetapple	4:00:26:31
67	S17	Arcadia	(Victoria (state)) Victoria	Joubert Nivelt Archambault A40 RC	12.00	Peter Davison	4:01:02:12
68	7174	Mille Sabords	New South Wales	Murray Burns Dovell Sydney 38	11.80	Robert Frayne	4:01:15:42
69	6343	Great Xpectations	New South Wales	Jeppesen X43	12.94	Rod Wills	4:01:18:23
70	11407	Pelagic Magic	New South Wales	Farr Beneteau 40.7	11.90	Simon Dunlop	4:01:20:34
71	7551	Flying Fish Arctos	New South Wales	Radford McIntyre 55	15.36	George Martin	4:01:51:41
72	B454	Audere	(Victoria (state)) Victoria	Briand Beneteau First 45	13.70	John Cain	4:02:13:27
73	A164	Sticky	New South Wales	J&J Salona 38	11.50	Richard Harris	4:03:14:31
74	101	Mark Twain	Queensland	Sparkman & Stephens S&S 39	12.00	Michael Spies	4:03:50:40
75	5930	Reve	New South Wales	Farr Beneteau 45F5	14.00	Kevin Whelan	4:03:52:51
76	3430	Komatsu Azzurro	New South Wales	Sparkman & Stephens S&S 34	10.10	Shane Kearns	4:07:24:17
77	774337	Relish IV	New South Wales	J&J Elan 43	13.00	Leeann Lynch; Kalevi Kokkonen	4:07:56:21
78	3867	Gun Runner	New South Wales	King Jarkan 925	9.30	Maurice Young	4:11:11:41
79	8824	Chancellor	New South Wales	Farr Beneteau 47.7	14.80	Edward Tooher	4:12:24:25
DNF	AUS615	2 Unlimited	Tasmania	Farr 40 Mod	12.40	Greg Prescott	Retired-Broken Rudder
DNF	AUS54000	Calypso	New South Wales	Dixon Moody 54 DS	16.70	Ivan Signorelli	Retired-Steering Issues
DNF	AUS52	M3 Team Hungary	New South Wales	Farr TP 52	15.85	Peter Hickson; Aron Ormandlaki	Retired-Dismasted
DNF	SM133	Patriot	(Victoria (state)) Victoria	Johnstone J133	13.30	Jason Close	Retired-Broken Rudder
DNF	HKG2276	Scallywag	Hong Kong	Dovell 100	30.48	Seng Huang Lee; David Witt	Retired-Broken Bowsprit
DNF	52001	Zen	New South Wales	Botin TP52	15.90	Gordon Ketelbey	Retired-Rig Damage

=== Overall Handicap ===
Pos	Division Number	Sail Number	Yacht	State/Country	Yacht Type	LOA (Metres)	Skipper	Elapsed time d:hh:mm:ss
1	0	52566	Alive	Tasmania	Reichel Pugh 66	20.10	Duncan Hine	3:06:41:16
2	0	7001	Wild Oats X	New South Wales	Reichel Pugh 66	20.10	Stacey Jackson	3:07:55:11
3	1	AUS98888	Voodoo	(Victoria (state)) Victoria	Reichel Pugh 63	19.20	Hugh Ellis	3:08:44:20
4	1	AUS01	Winning Appliances	New South Wales	Carkeek 60	18.30	John Winning Jr.	3:09:03:25
5	1	AUS001	Ichi Ban	New South Wales	Botin 52	15.85	Matthew Allen	3:09:17:15
6	1	USA6066	Prospector	United States	Mills 68	20.80	Terrence Glackin	3:11:07:46
7	0	USA50009	Privateer	United States	Farr Cookson 50	15.25	Scott Innes-Jones	3:12:06:51
8	0	525100	Black Jack	Queensland	Reichel Pugh 100	30.48	Mark Bradford	3:12:09:45
9	3	099	Grace O'Malley	New South Wales	Farr Cookson 12	11.90	Zoe Taylor	3:12:10:47
10	1	AUS8899	Hollywood Boulevard	New South Wales	Farr 55	16.80	Ray Roberts	3:12:35:15
11	0	10001	Wild Oats XI	New South Wales	Reichel Pugh RP100	30.48	Mark Richards	3:12:59:40
12	0	SYD 1000	Infotrack	New South Wales	Juan Yacht Design Juan-K 100	30.48	Christian Beck; Joe Akacich	3:13:11:47
13	3	F1701	Enterprise	Western Australia	Farr 40	12.40	Anthony Kirke	3:13:30:15
14	2	6686	St Jude	New South Wales	Murray Burns Dovell Sydney 47	14.20	Noel Cornish	3:13:44:02
15	2	R33	Chutzpah	(Victoria (state)) Victoria	Reichel Pugh Caprice 40	12.35	Bruce Taylor	3:14:07:06
16	2	360	Patrice	New South Wales	Ker 46	13.90	Tony Kirby	3:14:37:35
17	1	6952	Celestial	New South Wales	Judel Vrolijk TP 52	15.85	Sam Haynes	3:14:47:09
18	3	7709	SailExchange	New South Wales	Farr Cookson 12	12.00	Carl Crafoord; Tim Horkings	3:15:10:14
19	1	RQ0052	Envy Scooters	Queensland	Judel Vrolijk TP 52	15.85	Barry Cuneo	3:15:26:35
20	0	AUS12358	Comanche	New South Wales	Verdier VPLP 100 Supermaxi	30.48	Jim Cooney; Samantha Grant	3:15:30:37
21	1	FRA8668	Teasing Machine	France	Nivelt Muratet NMYD 54	16.50	Eric de Turckheim	3:16:05:48
22	1	052	Gweilo	New South Wales	Judel Vrolijk TP52	15.90	Matt Donald; Chris Townsend	3:16:25:14
23	2	8338	Showtime	New South Wales	Ker 40	12.20	Mark Griffith	3:16:32:52
24	2	421	Smuggler	New South Wales	Rogers 46	14.00	Sebastian Bohm	3:16:38:47
25	3	33345	Black Sheep	New South Wales	Briand Beneteau 45	13.70	Matthew Pilkington; Rob Gourlay	3:16:47:38
26	1	52152	Koa	New South Wales	Farr TP 52	15.85	Peter Wrigley; Andrew Kearnan	3:16:52:59
27	1	AUS70	Ragamuffin	New South Wales	Farr TP 52	15.85	Brenton Fischer	3:17:12:17
28	3	5038	Cinquante	New South Wales	Murray Burns Dovell Sydney 38	11.80	Kim Jaggar	3:17:53:23
29	1	GBR5211L	Frantic	New South Wales	Donovan TP 52	15.85	Michael Martin	3:18:10:39
30	3	MH46	Kayimai	New South Wales	Humphreys Azuree 46	14.00	Rob Aldis	3:18:19:20
31	1	5200	Bush Paul Group	New South Wales	Farr TP 52	15.85	Mathew Short	3:18:42:13
32	1	S777	Primitive Cool	(Victoria (state)) Victoria	Reichel Pugh RP51	15.61	John Newbold	3:18:51:13
33	3	6396	Sports Bar	New South Wales	Farr Beneteau 47.7	14.30	Neville Blair; Greg Mason	3:19:32:16
34	3	41	Matrix	Queensland	Jeppesen X41	12.60	Graham Furtado	3:19:47:23
35	4	6755	Ausreo	New South Wales	Farr Beneteau 47.7	14.00	Ian Creek	3:19:49:19
36	3	6836	Anger Management	Western Australia	J&J Salona 44	13.40	Tim Stewart	3:19:54:08
37	3	MH60	TSA Management	New South Wales	Murray Burns Dovell Sydney 38	11.80	Tony Levett	3:19:55:27
38	2	AUS7742	Kialoa II	New South Wales	Sparkman & Stephens S&S 73 Yawl	23.00	Patrick Broughton	3:20:00:06
39	1	AUS1	Naval Group	New South Wales	Reichel Pugh 69	21.50	Sean Langman	3:20:17:19
40	4	6841	Papillon	New South Wales	Joubert Nivelt Archambault A40 RC	12.00	Phil Molony	3:20:49:22
41	0	AUS03	Noahs II	China	Jones Volvo Open 70	21.50	Ting Lee	3:21:09:02
42	4	ST36	Midnight Rambler	New South Wales	Murray Burns Dovell Sydney 36	10.80	Ed Psaltis	3:21:15:57
43	2	B330	Hartbreaker	(Victoria (state)) Victoria	Reichel Pugh 46	14.20	Tony & Gaye Walton	3:21:24:53
44	2	G4646R	Extasea	(Victoria (state)) Victoria	Mills DK46	14.00	Paul Buchholz	3:21:59:31
45	2	CAY6536	Oroton Drumfire	New South Wales	Hoek TC78	24.00	Phillip Neal	3:22:31:20
46	1	6377	Triton	New South Wales	Lyons-Cawse LC60	18.30	Michael Cranitch; David Gotze	3:22:39:53
47	3	07	Wings	New South Wales	Judel Vrolijk Dehler 46	14.00	Ian Edwards	3:22:54:54
48	2	GER7475	Lunatix	Germany	Jeppesen XP50	15.00	Friedrich Boehnert	3:22:58:16
49	1	HKG2384	Apsaras	Hong Kong	Reichel Pugh Advanced A80	24.00	Li Jian; Travis Read	4:00:23:54
50	4	3867	Gun Runner	New South Wales	King Jarkan 925	9.30	Maurice Young	4:00:28:31
51	4	W1424	Mayfair	Queensland	Farr Beneteau First 40	12.20	James Irvine	4:00:31:27
52	4	101	Mark Twain	Queensland	Sparkman & Stephens S&S 39	12.00	Michael Spies	4:00:38:58
53	4	3430	Komatsu Azzurro	New South Wales	Sparkman & Stephens S&S 34	10.10	Shane Kearns	4:00:41:00
54	4	1986	Trumpcard	Queensland	Van de Stadt 44	13.31	Blake Boulton	4:00:46:59
55	3	89	Joy Ride	United States	Johnstone J122e	12.19	John Murkowski	4:01:20:36
56	2	AUS070	URM	New South Wales	Farr 50	15.50	Adrian Dunphy	4:02:10:05
57	2	RF9095	Dare Devil	New South Wales	Farr Cookson 47	14.30	Sibby Ilzhofer	4:04:39:49
58	3	SM400	Avalanche	(Victoria (state)) Victoria	Hick 40	12.30	Gary Fisher; Andrew McGrath; Chris Auger	4:05:29:46
59	2	6559	Wots Next	New South Wales	Murray Burns Dovell Sydney 47	14.20	Charles Cupit	4:05:51:50
60	4	11407	Pelagic Magic	New South Wales	Farr Beneteau 40.7	11.90	Simon Dunlop	4:06:30:07
61	4	A164	Sticky	New South Wales	J&J Salona 38	11.50	Richard Harris	4:07:24:36
62	4	6774	Jackpot	New South Wales	Johnstone J122	12.20	Robert Hale; Matt Gooden	4:07:26:30
63	4	6343	Great Xpectations	New South Wales	Jeppesen X43	12.94	Rod Wills	4:08:12:55
64	4	S17	Arcadia	(Victoria (state)) Victoria	Joubert Nivelt Archambault A40 RC	12.00	Peter Davison	4:08:42:09
65	3	7174	Mille Sabords	New South Wales	Murray Burns Dovell Sydney 38	11.80	Robert Frayne	4:10:59:16
66	3	1545	Dreki Sunnan	New South Wales	Briand Beneteau First 45	13.60	Ken Holmes	4:11:42:34
67	3	B454	Audere	(Victoria (state)) Victoria	Briand Beneteau First 45	13.70	John Cain	4:11:51:00
68	3	8824	Chancellor	New South Wales	Farr Beneteau 47.7	14.80	Edward Tooher	5:00:19:54
DNF	3	AUS615	2 Unlimited	Tasmania	Farr 40 Mod	12.40	Greg Prescott	Retired-Broken Rudder
DNF	1	AUS52	M3 Team Hungary	New South Wales	Farr TP 52	15.85	Peter Hickson; Aron Ormandlaki	Retired-Dismasted
DNF	3	SM133	Patriot	(Victoria (state)) Victoria	Johnstone J133	13.30	Jason Close	Retired-Broken Rudder
DNF	1	52001	Zen	New South Wales	Botin TP52	15.90	Gordon Ketelbey	Retired-Rig Damage
