= 2017 Sydney to Hobart Yacht Race =

2017 annual yacht race in Australia

73rd Sydney to Hobart Yacht Race
Event information
- Type: Yacht
- Dates: 26 December 2017 - 1 January 2018
- Sponsor: Rolex
- Host city: Sydney, Hobart
- Boats: 102
- Distance: 628 nautical miles (1,163 km)
- Website: Website archive

Results
- Winner (2017): LDV Comanche (Jim Cooney)

Succession
- Previous: Perpetual Loyal (Anthony Bell, Tom Slingsby) in 2016
- Next: Wild Oats XI (Mark Richards) in 2018

The 2017 Sydney to Hobart Yacht Race was the 73rd annual running of the Sydney to Hobart Yacht Race. Hosted by the Cruising Yacht Club of Australia and sponsored by Rolex, it began at Sydney Harbour at 13:00 on 26 December 2017, before heading south for 628 nautical miles (1,163 km) via the Tasman Sea, Bass Strait, Storm Bay and up the River Derwent, to cross the finish line in Hobart, Tasmania.

A fleet of 102 boats contested the race and 96 finished. These included past winners Wizard, Perpetual Loyal (now InfoTrack), Wild Oats XI, Black Jack, LDV Comanche and Kialoa II. Wild Oats XI was the first to cross the finish line at 1:08:48:50, a new record, but the crew of the LDV Comanche lodged a protest against Wild Oats XI after nearly being hit at the start of the race. Wild Oats XI incurred a 1-hour penalty, putting them behind winner LDV Comanche by 33 minutes and 26 seconds for line honours. LDV Comanche also claimed the time record of 1:09:15:24. Ichi Ban (Matt Allen) was awarded Tattersall's Cup.

== Results ==
=== Line Honours ===
Pos	Sail Number	Yacht	State/Country	Yacht Type	LOA (Metres)	Skipper	Elapsed time d:hh:mm:ss
1	12358	LDV Comanche	New South Wales	Verdier VPLP 100 Supermaxi	30.48	Jim Cooney	1:09:15:24
2	10001	Wild Oats XI	New South Wales	Reichel Pugh 100	30.48	Mark Richards	1:09:48:50 ^{1}
3	525100	Black Jack	Queensland	Reichel Pugh 100	30.48	Mark Bradford	1:11:41:32
4	HKG1997	Beau Geste	Hong Kong	Botin 80	24.40	Karl Kwok	1:12:36:23
5	USA70000	Wizard	United States	Juan-K Volvo Open 70	21.50	David & Peter Askew	1:13:43:47
6	7001	Wild Oats X	New South Wales	Reichel Pugh 66	20.10	Troy Tindill	1:15:20:18
7	AUS001	Ichi Ban	New South Wales	Botin TP 52	15.85	Matthew Allen	1:19:10:20
8	7771	Quest	New South Wales	Farr TP 52	15.85	Bob Steel; Mike Green	1:20:08:49
9	AUS8899	Hollywood Boulevard	New South Wales	Farr 55	16.76	Ray Roberts	1:21:03:15
10	ITA14909	Mascalzone Latino 32	Italy	Farr Cookson 50	15.20	Matteo Savelli	1:21:05:32
11	6952	Celestial	New South Wales	Judel Vrolijk TP 52	15.85	Sam Haynes	1:22:06:03
12	RQ0052	ENVY Scooters Beachball 52	Queensland	Judel Vrolijk TP 52	15.85	Barry Cuneo	1:22:58:10
13	YC45	Concubine	South Australia	Mills 45	13.70	Jason Ward	1:23:19:27
14	6377	Triton	New South Wales	Lyons-Cawse LC60	18.30	Michael Cranitch; David Gotze	1:23:33:06
15	52152	Koa	New South Wales	Farr TP 52	15.85	Peter Wrigley; Andrew Kearnan	1:23:33:32
16	NZL8977	Ran Tan II	New Zealand	Elliott 50	15.20	Brian Petersen	1:23:34:04
17	AUS47	Indian	Western Australia	Carkeek 47	14.30	Craig Carter	1:23:34:19
18	360	Patrice	New South Wales	Ker 46	13.90	Tony Kirby	1:23:36:56
19	5200	Highfield Caringbah	New South Wales	Farr TP 52	15.85	Ian & Mathew Short	2:00:00:36
20	2382	Derucci	China	Farr TP 52	15.85	Qing Dong	2:00:35:26
21	AUS52	M3	Western Australia	Farr TP 52	15.85	Peter Hickson	2:00:51:51
22	421	Smuggler	New South Wales	Rogers 46	14.00	Sebastian Bohm	2:00:54:40
23	KOR-5555	Sonic	South Korea	Donovan TP 52	15.85	Kwangmin Rho	2:01:22:11
24	SYD 1000	Infotrack	New South Wales	Juan Yacht Design Juan-K 100	30.48	Christian Beck; Tom Slingsby	1:12:11:19 ^{2}
25	USA61333	Triple Lindy	United States	Farr Cookson 50	15.20	Joseph Mele	2:01:54:35
26	AUS5299	Oskana	Tasmania	Farr Cookson 50	15.20	Michael Pritchard	2:01:59:17
27	R33	Chutzpah	(Victoria (state)) Victoria	Reichel Pugh Caprice 40	12.35	Bruce Taylor	2:04:10:37
28	A5	GBP Yeah Baby	New South Wales	Welbourn 50	15.20	Lindsay Stead; Marc Ryckmans	2:07:13:57
29	8008	Snowdome Occasional Coarse Language Too	New South Wales	Ker Sydney GTS 43	13.10	Warwick Shearman	2:13:32:19
30	6686	St Jude	New South Wales	Murray Burns Dovell Sydney 47	14.20	Noel Cornish	2:17:39:09
31	262	Helsal 3	New South Wales	Adams 20	20.00	David Stephenson	2:22:21:38
32	USA4304	Christopher Dragon	United States	Ker Sydney 43 Modified	13.10	Andrew & Linda Weiss	2:22:27:53
33	93	Merlin	New South Wales	Forbes-Kaiko 52	15.60	David Forbes	2:23:45:10
34	B330	Hartbreaker	(Victoria (state)) Victoria	Reichel Pugh 46	14.20	Tony & Gaye Walton	2:23:51:48
35	ITA3956	Weddell	Poland	Farr Grand Mistral 80	24.00	Adanasy Isaev; Przemyslaw Tarnacki	2:23:54:01
36	GBR723X	HotelPianner.com	(United Kingdom) Great Britain	Castro Clipper 70	21.33	Conall Morrison	3:02:31:07 ^{3}
37	AUS70	SailDNA	New South Wales	Farr 50	15.20	Emir Ruzdic; Adrian Dunphy	3:03:02:04
38	36	Khaleesi	New South Wales	Mills DK46	14.10	Andrew & Pauline Dally	3:03:05:15
39	FRA39337	Banque de Nouvelle Caledonie	New Caledonia	Valer JPK 10.80	10.80	Michel Quintin	3:03:22:09
40	GBR727X	Sanya Serenity Coast	(United Kingdom) Great Britain	Castro Clipper 70	21.33	Wendy Tuck	3:03:29:29
41	GBR722X	Garmin	(United Kingdom) Great Britain	Castro Clipper 70	21.33	Gaetan Thomas	3:03:31:47
42	099	Grace O'Malley	New South Wales	Farr Cookson 12	11.90	Zoe Taylor	3:03:37:46
43	GBR731X	Nasdaq	(United Kingdom) Great Britain	Castro Clipper 70	21.33	Robert Graham	3:03:39:50
44	GBR726X	Visit Seattle	(United Kingdom) Great Britain	Castro Clipper 70	21.33	Nicola Henderson	3:03:49:08
45	RF9095	Dare Devil	New South Wales	Farr Cookson 47	14.30	Sibby Ilzhofer	3:03:53:13
46	ESP6100	Duende	New South Wales	Judel Vrolijk TP 52	15.39	Damien Parkes	3:03:53:19
47	33345	Black Sheep	New South Wales	Briand Beneteau 45	13.70	Derek & Martin Sheppard	3:03:58:48
48	GBR728X	PSP Logistics	(United Kingdom) Great Britain	Castro Clipper 70	21.33	Matthew Mitchell	3:03:59:26
49	6953	PYR-ArnoldCo/Wot Eva	New South Wales	Nelson Marek TP 52	15.85	Christian Reynolds	2:10:02:52 ^{4}
50	GBR9359T	Invictus Games 2018 Game On	(United Kingdom) Great Britain	Dubois Clipper 68	20.77	Will Parbury	3:04:00:53
51	G4646R	Extasea	(Victoria (state)) Victoria	Mills DK46	14.00	Paul Buchholz	3:04:02:00
52	GBR721X	Unicef	(United Kingdom) Great Britain	Castro Clipper 70	21.33	Bob Beggs	3:04:03:08
53	GBR730X	GREAT Britain	(United Kingdom) Great Britain	Castro Clipper 70	21.33	Andrew Burns	3:04:08:05
54	GBR725X	Dare to Lead	(United Kingdom) Great Britain	Castro Clipper 70	21.33	Dale Smyth	3:04:08:56
55	GBR720X	Liverpool 2018	(United Kingdom) Great Britain	Castro Clipper 70	21.33	Lance Shepherd	3:04:09:05
56	MH60	TSA Management	New South Wales	Murray Burns Dovell Sydney 38	11.80	Tony Levett	3:04:18:50
57	7777	Calibre	New South Wales	Murray Burns Dovell Sydney 38	11.80	Richard Williams	3:04:29:12
58	5612	Abracadabra	New South Wales	Tripp 47	14.33	James Murchison	3:04:33:45
59	N11	Climate Action Now	New South Wales	Hick Open 50	15.25	Lisa Blair; Libby Greenhalgh	3:04:40:50
60	6419	Pekljus	New South Wales	Radford 50	15.24	David Suttie	3:04:42:18
61	W1424	Mayfair	Queensland	Farr Beneteau First 40	12.20	James Irvine	3:04:44:26
62	248	Wax Lyrical	New South Wales	Jeppesen X50	15.20	Les Goodridge	3:04:47:52
63	A140	Ariel	New South Wales	Farr Beneteau First 40	12.60	Ron Forster; Philip Damp	3:04:49:09
64	GBR729X	Qingdao	(United Kingdom) Great Britain	Castro Clipper 70	21.33	Christoffer Kobusch	3:04:56:49
65	NZL1	Seamo Racing Mahligai	New Zealand	Murray Burns Dovell Sydney 46	14.30	Murray Owen; Jenny Kingz	3:05:00:40
66	8565	Eve	New South Wales	Sparkman & Stephens Swan 65	20.00	Steven Capell	3:05:14:38 ^{5}
67	370	She's The Culprit	New South Wales	Inglis-Jones 39 Modified	12.00	Glenn Bulmer; Glen Picasso	3:05:26:48
68	AUS7742	Kialoa II	New South Wales	Sparkman & Stephens S&S 73 Yawl	23.00	Patrick & Keith Broughton	3:05:34:10
69	11744	XS Moment BNMH	New South Wales	Jeppesen XP44	13.30	Ray Hudson	3:05:34:43
70	USA60564	Warrior Won	United States	Jeppesen XP44	13.30	Christopher Sheehan	3:05:47:50
71	4527	China Easyway	New South Wales	King Jarkan 12.5	12.70	Travis Read; Tim Wilson	3:05:47:53
72	6723	Allegro	New South Wales	Warwick 67	20.30	Adrian Lewis	3:05:51:58
73	7551	Flying Fish Arctos	New South Wales	Radford McIntyre 55	15.36	Alex Martin	3:05:52:07
74	GBR5790	Enigma	New South Wales	Farr Beneteau First 47.7	14.90	Jason Bond	3:05:54:32
75	415	Arch Rival	New South Wales	Inglis-Jones 40	12.00	Andrew Byrne	3:06:19:52
76	RQ3600	Mister Lucky	Queensland	Andrieu Jeanneau Sun Fast 3600	11.30	Mark Hipgrave	3:06:25:09
77	16	Dorade	United States	Sparkman & Stephens S&S 52 Yawl	16.00	Matt Brooks; Kevin Miller	3:06:37:58
78	6305	Mondo	Queensland	Murray Burns Dovell Sydney 38	11.80	Ray Sweeney	3:07:28:03
79	6891	Takani	New South Wales	Judel Vrolijk Hanse 495	15.40	James Whittle	3:08:17:56
80	22000	Vanishing Point	New South Wales	Farr Beneteau 57	17.60	Bill Wheeler	3:08:59:32
81	SM69	Dark and Stormy	(Victoria (state)) Victoria	Murray Custom 37	11.40	Terry Kourtis; Stuart Mellington	3:12:03:32
82	SA346	Enchantress	South Australia	Muirhead 11	11.00	John Willoughby	3:12:25:25
83	5930	Reve	New South Wales	Farr Beneteau 45F5	14.00	Kevin Whelan	3:13:30:30
84	7447	Another Painkiller	Queensland	Farr Beneteau First 44.7	13.40	Rod West	3:13:40:49
85	GBR9354T	Invictus Games 2018 Down Under	(United Kingdom) Great Britain	Dubois Clipper 68	20.77	Steve Grellis	3:14:56:35
86	8810	Ocean Gem	Queensland	Farr Beneteau 445	13.50	David Hows	3:16:50:34
87	8824	Chancellor	New South Wales	Farr Beneteau 47.7	14.80	Edward Tooher	3:17:24:22
88	H8118	Merlion	(Victoria (state)) Victoria	Farr Beneteau 40.7	11.90	Eddie Mackevicius	3:18:33:13
89	5296	Magic Miles	Tasmania	Briand Dynamique 62	18.70	Michael Crew	3:18:41:38
90	E2	Euphoria II	Queensland	Frers Beneteau First 42	12.90	Marc Stuart	3:23:03:31
91	4924	She	Queensland	Mull Olsen 40 Modified	12.20	Philip Bell	4:01:32:38
92	3430	Komatsu Azzurro	New South Wales	Sparkman & Stephens S&S 34	10.10	Shane Kearns	4:02:23:04
93	A19	Maluka	New South Wales	Gale Ranger 30	9.01	Sean Langman	4:04:51:01
94	3867	Gun Runner	New South Wales	King Jarkan 925	9.30	Maurice Young	5:00:22:01
95	RQ1920	Charlie's Dream	Queensland	Holland-Cole-Lowe Bluewater 450	13.70	Peter Lewis; Graeme Boyd	5:00:58:19
96	N10	Freyja	New South Wales	Atkins Ingrid 37	11.40	Richard Lees	5:19:09:59
DNF	H4000	Blunderbuss	(Victoria (state)) Victoria	Farr Beneteau First 40	12.00	Eric Marsh	Retired-Broken Boom
DNF	6893	Imalizard	New South Wales	Welbourn 12	11.80	Bruce Watson	Retired-Dismasted
DNF	SM390	Jazz Player	(Victoria (state)) Victoria	Bakewell-White 39	11.90	Matthew Lawrence	Retired-HF Not Operational
DNF	B45	Opt2Go Scamp	Queensland	Briand Beneteau First 45	14.10	Mike Mollison	Retired-Sail Damage
DNF	GER7600	Rockall	Germany	Judel Vrolijk TP 52	15.85	Christopher Opielok	Retired-Broken Rudder
DNF	6559	Wots Next	New South Wales	Murray Burns Dovell Sydney 47	14.20	Charles Cupit	Retired-Broken Rudder Bearings

Notes

^1 – Wild Oats XI were given a 60 minutes penalty to be added onto their elapsed time by the International Jury due to breaching RRS Part 2 in a near collision with LDV Comanche at the start of the race in Sydney Harbour.
^2 – Infotrack were penalised 20% of their placing by the International Jury due to failing to lodge a declaration within six hours of their finish time as required by Sailing Instruction 26 (Declarations).
^3 – HotelPlanner.com were given a 120 minutes redress to be subtracted off their elapsed time under RRS 62 by the International Jury due to an incident where their provided assistance after a crew member from Invictus Games 2018 Down Under was thrown overboard and later rescued on the first day of the race.
^4 – PYR-ArnoldCo/Wot Eva were penalised 20% of their placing by the International Jury due to failing to lodge a declaration within six hours of their finish time as required by Sailing Instruction 26 (Declarations).
^5 – Eve were given a 50 minutes redress to be subtracted off their elapsed time under RRS 62 by the International Jury due to an incident where their provided assistance after a crew member from Invictus Games 2018 Down Under was thrown overboard and later rescued on the first day of the race.

=== Overall Handicap ===
Pos	Division	Sail Number	Yacht	State/Country	Yacht Type	LOA (Metres)	Skipper	Elapsed time d:hh:mm:ss
1	1	AUS001	Ichi Ban	New South Wales	Botin TP 52	15.85	Matthew Allen	2:12:13:31
2	1	7771	Quest	New South Wales	Farr TP 52	15.85	Bob Steel; Mike Green	2:12:34:11
3	2	360	Patrice	New South Wales	Ker 46	13.90	Tony Kirby	2:13:16:52
4	0	USA70000	Wizard	United States	Juan-K Volvo Open 70	21.50	David & Peter Askew	2:13:25:26
5	0	ITA14909	Mascalzone Latino 32	Italy	Farr Cookson 50	15.20	Matteo Savelli	2:13:38:28
6	2	421	Smuggler	New South Wales	Rogers 46	14.00	Sebastian Bohm	2:13:40:37
7	1	YC45	Concubine	South Australia	Mills 45	13.70	Jason Ward	2:13:56:50
8	2	R33	Chutzpah	(Victoria (state)) Victoria	Reichel Pugh Caprice 40	12.35	Bruce Taylor	2:14:11:42
9	1	6952	Celestial	New South Wales	Judel Vrolijk TP 52	15.85	Sam Haynes	2:14:39:04
10	0	HKG1997	Beau Geste	Hong Kong	Botin 80	24.40	Karl Kwok	2:14:53:23
11	0	7001	Wild Oats X	New South Wales	Reichel Pugh 66	20.10	Troy Tindill	2:15:16:14
12	1	AUS47	Indian	Western Australia	Carkeek 47	14.30	Craig Carter	2:15:16:14
13	0	AUS8899	Hollywood Boulevard	New South Wales	Farr 55	16.76	Ray Roberts	2:16:01:19
14	1	52152	Koa	New South Wales	Farr TP 52	15.85	Peter Wrigley; Andrew Kearnan	2:16:06:34
15	1	5200	Highfield Caringbah	New South Wales	Farr TP 52	15.85	Ian & Mathew Short	2:16:48:49
16	1	RQ0052	ENVY Scooters Beachball 52	Queensland	Judel Vrolijk TP 52	15.85	Barry Cuneo	2:17:39:48
17	1	AUS52	M3	Western Australia	Farr TP 52	15.85	Peter Hickson	2:17:55:04
18	1	2382	Derucci	China	Farr TP 52	15.85	Qing Dong	2:17:59:10
19	0	12358	LDV Comanche	New South Wales	Verdier VPLP 100 Supermaxi	30.48	Jim Cooney	2:18:00:52
20	1	KOR-5555	Sonic	South Korea	Donovan TP 52	15.85	Kwangmin Rho	2:18:18:13
21	0	10001	Wild Oats XI	New South Wales	Reichel Pugh 100	30.48	Mark Richards	2:18:34:46
22	1	USA61333	Triple Lindy	United States	Farr Cookson 50	15.20	Joseph Mele	2:18:37:46
23	0	AUS5299	Oskana	Tasmania	Farr Cookson 50	15.20	Michael Pritchard	2:19:32:02
24	0	NZL8977	Ran Tan II	New Zealand	Elliott 50	15.20	Brian Petersen	2:19:32:46
25	0	6377	Triton	New South Wales	Lyons-Cawse LC60	18.30	Michael Cranitch; David Gotze	2:20:11:21
26	0	525100	Black Jack	Queensland	Reichel Pugh 100	30.48	Mark Bradford	2:20:53:10
27	2	A5	GBP Yeah Baby	New South Wales	Welbourn 50	15.20	Lindsay Stead; Marc Ryckmans	2:22:51:48
28	2	8008	Snowdome Occasional Coarse Language Too	New South Wales	Ker Sydney GTS 43	13.10	Warwick Shearman	3:00:40:38
29	2	6686	St Jude	New South Wales	Murray Burns Dovell Sydney 47	14.20	Noel Cornish	3:06:03:39
30	4	FRA39337	Banque de Nouvelle Caledonie	New Caledonia	Valer JPK 10.80	10.80	Michel Quintin	3:06:36:36
31	4	16	Dorade	United States	Sparkman & Stephens S&S 52 Yawl	16.00	Matt Brooks; Kevin Miller	3:07:34:35
32	4	4527	China Easyway	New South Wales	King Jarkan 12.5	12.70	Travis Read; Tim Wilson	3:08:49:56
33	4	RQ3600	Mister Lucky	Queensland	Andrieu Jeanneau Sun Fast 3600	11.30	Mark Hipgrave	3:09:19:14
34	3	A140	Ariel	New South Wales	Farr Beneteau First 40	12.60	Ron Forster; Philip Damp	3:10:48:40
35	3	W1424	Mayfair	Queensland	Farr Beneteau First 40	12.20	James Irvine	3:10:57:24
36	3	MH60	TSA Management	New South Wales	Murray Burns Dovell Sydney 38	11.80	Tony Levett	3:11:56:43
37	3	33345	Black Sheep	New South Wales	Briand Beneteau 45	13.70	Derek & Martin Sheppard	3:12:11:09
38	3	7777	Calibre	New South Wales	Murray Burns Dovell Sydney 38	11.80	Richard Williams	3:12:17:18
39	2	USA4304	Christopher Dragon	United States	Ker Sydney 43 Modified	13.10	Andrew & Linda Weiss	3:13:03:03
40	3	099	Grace O'Malley	New South Wales	Farr Cookson 12	11.90	Zoe Taylor	3:13:27:41
41	3	8565	Eve	New South Wales	Sparkman & Stephens Swan 65	20.00	Steven Capell	3:13:53:43
42	3	GBR5790	Enigma	New South Wales	Farr Beneteau First 47.7	14.90	Jason Bond	3:05:54:32
43	0	SYD 1000	Infotrack	New South Wales	Juan Yacht Design Juan-K 100	30.48	Christian Beck; Tom Slingsby	2:22:21:02 ^{1}
44	4	SA346	Enchantress	South Australia	Muirhead 11	11.00	John Willoughby	3:14:52:19
45	3	6305	Mondo	Queensland	Murray Burns Dovell Sydney 38	11.80	Ray Sweeney	3:15:29:37
46	2	H8118	Merlion	(Victoria (state)) Victoria	Farr Beneteau 40.7	11.90	Eddie Mackevicius	3:15:36:37
47	3	USA60564	Warrior Won	United States	Jeppesen XP44	13.30	Christopher Sheehan	3:16:13:19
48	2	36	Khaleesi	New South Wales	Mills DK46	14.10	Andrew & Pauline Dally	3:16:31:41
49	4	A19	Maluka	New South Wales	Gale Ranger 30	9.01	Sean Langman	3:16:32:48
50	3	11744	XS Moment BNMH	New South Wales	Jeppesen XP44	13.30	Ray Hudson	3:17:03:37
51	2	G4646R	Extasea	(Victoria (state)) Victoria	Mills DK46	14.00	Paul Buchholz	3:18:19:39
52	4	8810	Ocean Gem	Queensland	Farr Beneteau 445	13.50	David Hows	3:18:26:31
53	4	3430	Komatsu Azzurro	New South Wales	Sparkman & Stephens S&S 34	10.10	Shane Kearns	3:19:23:57
54	2	GBR9359T	Invictus Games 2018 Game On	(United Kingdom) Great Britain	Dubois Clipper 68	20.77	Will Parbury	3:19:26:45
55	2	B330	Hartbreaker	(Victoria (state)) Victoria	Reichel Pugh 46	14.20	Tony & Gaye Walton	3:20:16:21
56	2	AUS7742	Kialoa II	New South Wales	Sparkman & Stephens S&S 73 Yawl	23.00	Patrick & Keith Broughton	3:20:37:05
57	2	RF9095	Dare Devil	New South Wales	Farr Cookson 47	14.30	Sibby Ilzhofer	3:21:02:15
58	3	SM69	Dark and Stormy	(Victoria (state)) Victoria	Murray Custom 37	11.40	Terry Kourtis; Stuart Mellington	3:21:23:22
59	2	N11	Climate Action Now	New South Wales	Hick Open 50	15.25	Lisa Blair; Libby Greenhalgh	3:21:28:25
60	3	7447	Another Painkiller	Queensland	Farr Beneteau First 44.7	13.40	Rod West	3:21:49:12
61	4	E2	Euphoria II	Queensland	Frers Beneteau First 42	12.90	Marc Stuart	3:22:57:49
62	4	H8118	Merlion	(Victoria (state)) Victoria	Farr Beneteau 40.7	11.90	Eddie Mackevicius	3:23:42:55
63	1	GBR723X	HotelPianner.com	(United Kingdom) Great Britain	Castro Clipper 70	21.33	Conall Morrison	3:23:58:48
64	1	GBR727X	Sanya Serenity Coast	(United Kingdom) Great Britain	Castro Clipper 70	21.33	Wendy Tuck	4:01:13:58
65	1	GBR722X	Garmin	(United Kingdom) Great Britain	Castro Clipper 70	21.33	Gaetan Thomas	4:01:16:56
66	1	GBR731X	Nasdaq	(United Kingdom) Great Britain	Castro Clipper 70	21.33	Robert Graham	4:01:27:18
67	1	GBR726X	Visit Seattle	(United Kingdom) Great Britain	Castro Clipper 70	21.33	Nicola Henderson	4:01:39:17
68	1	GBR728X	PSP Logistics	(United Kingdom) Great Britain	Castro Clipper 70	21.33	Matthew Mitchell	4:01:52:33
69	1	GBR721X	Unicef	(United Kingdom) Great Britain	Castro Clipper 70	21.33	Bob Beggs	4:01:57:19
70	1	GBR730X	GREAT Britain	(United Kingdom) Great Britain	Castro Clipper 70	21.33	Andrew Burns	4:02:03:41
71	1	GBR725X	Dare to Lead	(United Kingdom) Great Britain	Castro Clipper 70	21.33	Dale Smyth	4:02:04:47
72	1	GBR720X	Liverpool 2018	(United Kingdom) Great Britain	Castro Clipper 70	21.33	Lance Shepherd	4:02:04:59
73	1	GBR729X	Qingdao	(United Kingdom) Great Britain	Castro Clipper 70	21.33	Christoffer Kobusch	4:03:06:28
74	3	8824	Chancellor	New South Wales	Farr Beneteau 47.7	14.80	Edward Tooher	4:03:19:49
75	2	GBR9354T	Invictus Games 2018 Down Under	(United Kingdom) Great Britain	Dubois Clipper 68	20.77	Steve Grellis	4:08:35:33
76	0	ITA3956	Weddell	Poland	Farr Grand Mistral 80	24.00	Adanasy Isaev; Przemyslaw Tarnacki	4:11:46:43
77	4	3867	Gun Runner	New South Wales	King Jarkan 925	9.30	Maurice Young	4:12:12:36
DNF	3	H4000	Blunderbuss	(Victoria (state)) Victoria	Farr Beneteau First 40	12.00	Eric Marsh	Retired-Broken Boom
DNF	2	90	Jazz Player	(Victoria (state)) Victoria	Bakewell-White 39	11.90	Matthew Lawrence	Retired-HF Not Operational
DNF	1	GER7600	Rockall	Germany	Judel Vrolijk TP 52	15.85	Christopher Opielok	Retired-Broken Rudder
DNF	2	6559	Wots Next	New South Wales	Murray Burns Dovell Sydney 47	14.20	Charles Cupit	Retired-Broken Rudder Bearings

Notes

^1 – Infotrack were penalised 20% of their placing by the International Jury due to failing to lodge a declaration within six hours of their finish time as required by Sailing Instruction 26 (Declarations).
