= 2024 Sydney to Hobart Yacht Race =

2024 annual yacht race in Australia

79th Sydney to Hobart Yacht Race
Event information
- Type: Yacht
- Dates: 26 December 2024 - 3 January 2025
- Sponsor: Rolex
- Host city: Sydney, Hobart
- Boats: 104
- Distance: 628 nautical miles (1,163 km)
- Website: Rolex Sydney Hobart

Results
- Winner (2024): LawConnect (Christian Beck)

Succession
- Previous: LawConnect (Christian Beck) in 2023
- Next: Master Lock Comanche (2025)

The 2024 Sydney to Hobart Yacht Race, sponsored by Rolex and hosted by the Cruising Yacht Club of Australia (CYCA) in Sydney, is the 79th annual running of the Sydney to Hobart Yacht Race. It began on Port Jackson at 1 pm on Boxing Day (26 December 2024), before heading south for 628 nautical miles (1,163 km) through the Tasman Sea, Bass Strait, Storm Bay and up the River Derwent, to cross the finish line in Hobart, Tasmania.

A fleet of 104 boats started the race, of which 74 finished. Line honours were claimed by LawConnect in a time of 1 day, 13 hours, 35 minutes and 13 seconds.

On the first night of the race two sailors died in separate incidents on the boats Flying Fish Arctos and Bowline after being struck by the boom and main sheet respectively. These are the first deaths since 1998, which also had strong north easterly conditions.

A review commissioned by the CYCA found that both deaths occurred during crash gybes, an uncontrolled manoeuvre where the boom swings across the yacht with great force. The review concluded that mandatory helmets would not have saved either sailor, but recommended that future races enforce the use of automatic man overboard detection systems and requires crews to have a greater level of experience.

== Results ==
=== Line Honours ===
Pos	Sail Number	Yacht	State/Country	Yacht Type	LOA (Metres)	Skipper	Elapsed time d:hh:mm:ss
1	SYD1000	LawConnect	New South Wales	Juan Yacht Design Juan-K 100	30.48	Christian Beck	1:13:35:13
2	ITA70	Celestial V70	New South Wales	Juan-K Volvo Open 70	21.50	Sam Haynes	1:16:10:20
3	AUS1001	Wild Thing 100	Queensland	Botin-Ellis 100 Maxi	30.48	Grant Wharington; Adrian Seiffert	1:16:37:35
4	AUS13	Whisper	New South Wales	Judel Vrolijk JV62	18.90	David Griffith	2:03:43:50
5	AUS 98888	No Limit	New South Wales	Reichel Pugh 63	19.20	David Gotze	2:04:07:56
6	CAY52	Caro	New Zealand	Botin TP52	15.85	Max Klink	2:05:40:01
7	6952	Smuggler	New South Wales	Judel Vrolijk TP52	15.85	Sebastian Bohm	2:07:35:58
8	GBR2888L	Antipodes	Hong Kong	Santa Cruz 72	22.00	Geoffery Hill	2:17:33:06
9	OC52	Ocean Crusaders J-Bird	Queensland	Andrews TP52	15.85	Ian & Annika Thomson	2:20:16:21
10	JPN4321	Active Again	Queensland	Humphreys 54	16.50	Stephanie Kerin	2:23:36:46
11	R33	Chutzpah	(Victoria (state)) Victoria	Reichel Pugh Caprice 40	12.35	Bruce Taylor	3:02:14:30
12	43218	Happy Wanderer	Western Australia	Corby 49	14.90	Daniel Cannon	3:03:04:02
13	G10007	Extasea	(Victoria (state)) Victoria	Farr Cookson 50	15.20	Paul Buchholz	3:04:15:05
14	NZL10750	Awen	Queensland	Owen-Clark IMOCA Open 60	18.30	David Hows	3:04:17:20
15	112	Voltstar Yeah Baby	New South Wales	Akilaria RC2	12.00	Louis & Marc Ryckmans	3:04:52:08
16	FRA53081	Cocody	France	Valer JPK 11.80	11.80	Richard Fromentin	3:04:52:58
17	52569	Denali	New South Wales	Judel Vrolijk TP52	15.90	Damian Parkes	3:04:53:52
18	1	Mistral (DH)	New South Wales	Lombard 34	10.58	Rupert Henry; Corentin Douguet	3:06:16:04
19	O100	Maritimo 100	Queensland	Dubois Oyster 100	30.40	Bill Barry-Cotter	3:08:06:09
20	CAY6536	Oroton Drumfire	New South Wales	Hoek TC78	24.00	Will Vicars; Phillip Neal	3:08:49:45
21	AUS53	Odin	New South Wales	Biscontini Beneteau First 53	17.10	Matthew Hanning	3:09:53:15
22	F45	Sirene	Western Australia	Valer JPK 45	13.80	Bill Henson	3:10:11:57
23	PD147	Advantedge	Tasmania	Inglis 47	14.30	Andrew Jones	3:12:19:38
24	2527	Xanthus	New South Wales	Jeppesen X55	16.76	Matthew Fifield; Benjamin Roulant	3:14:24:20
25	424	Minnie	New South Wales	Jones 42	12.90	Michael Bell	3:15:06:45
26	SM1245	White Noise	(Victoria (state)) Victoria	Mills M.A.T. 1245	12.45	Daniel Edwards	3:16:13:00
27	07	Wings	New South Wales	Judel Vrolijk Dehler 46	14.00	Ian Edwards	3:17:07:42 ^{1}
28	211	Indigo II	Queensland	Reichel Pugh Marten 49	15.10	Darryn Purdy	3:17:32:30
29	7878	MWF Kayle	New South Wales	Lyons 54	16.20	John Whitfield	3:18:31:26
30	11744	XS Moment	New South Wales	Jeppesen XP44	13.30	Ray Hudson	3:18:38:15
31	N40	Mako	New South Wales	Murray Burns Dovell Sydney 40	12.00	Simon Macks; Greg Busch	3:18:38:35
32	ST36	Midnight Rambler	Tasmania	Murray Burns Dovell Sydney 36	10.80	Ed Psaltis	3:18:41:14
33	6559	Wots Next	New South Wales	Murray Burns Dovell Sydney 47	14.20	Charles Cupit	3:18:28:47
34	7709	Kanreki	New South Wales	Farr Cookson 12	12.00	Michael Rowe; Ben Martin	3:18:49:11
35	8009	Trouble & Strife	Queensland	Farr Cookson 12	12.00	Matthew Williams	3:17:32:30
36	RQ130	Ragtime	New South Wales	Johnstone J130	13.00	Steve Watson	3:19:49:36
37	3838	Clockwork	South Australia	Murray Burns Dovell Sydney 38	11.80	Andrew Lloyd; Mary Ann Harvey	3:19:52:14
38	FRA6900	Poulpito	New Caledonia	Murray Burns Dovell Sydney 38	11.80	David Treguier	3:20:06:34 ^{2}
39	1195	Quantock	New South Wales	Elliott 13 Mod	13.00	David & Alison Hobbs	3:20:28:33
40	2208	Tenacity	Tasmania	Mills 41	12.50	John Lawrie; Vaughan Lynch	3:20:29:01
41	294	Love & War	New South Wales	Sparkman & Stephens S&S 47	14.21	Simon & Phillip Kurts	3:20:35:25
42	5038	Cinquante	New South Wales	Murray Burns Dovell Sydney 38	11.80	Kim Jaggar	3:20:46:11
43	M133	Joker X2 (DH)	(Victoria (state)) Victoria	Johnstone J133	13.30	Grant Chipperfield; Peter Dowdney	3:20:52:52
44	RQ447	Solace	Queensland	Farr Beneteau First 44.7	13.40	Paul Pincus	3:21:16:53
45	0404	Navy One	New South Wales	Farr Beneteau First 40	12.20	Nathan Lockhart; Mark Butler	3:21:31:07
46	R1111	Toecutter	(Victoria (state)) Victoria	Hick 10	10.00	Robert Hick; Brad Bult	3:21:36:41
47	AUS99	Disko Trooper_Contender Sailcloth (DH)	New South Wales	Johnstone J99	9.90	Jules Hall; Jan Scholten	3:21:42:48
48	110	Pacman (DH)	Queensland	Young 11	11.00	Peter Elkington; Scott Cavanough	3:21:53:13
49	SA332	Audacious	South Australia	Murray Burns Dovell Sydney 38	11.80	Stuart Johnson	3:22:14:25
50	7811	Hip-Nautic	Tasmania	Andrieu Jeanneau Sunfast 3300	10.10	Jean-Pierre Ravanat	3:22:22:01
51	B71	Another Chapter	(Victoria (state)) Victoria	Farr Beneteau First 44.7	13.40	Neil Sargeant	3:22:23:23
52	MYC99	Jupiter (DH)	New South Wales	Johnstone J99	9.90	Ian Smith; Lincoln Dews	3:22:27:03
53	3322	Toucan (DH)	New South Wales	Andrieu Jeanneau Sunfast 3300	10.00	Edward Curry-Hyde; Scott Robertson	3:22:27:26
54	6499	Supernova	New South Wales	Murray Burns Dovell Sydney 36	10.80	Alex Seja; Felicity Nelson	3:22:37:53
55	AUS888	Min River (DH)	New South Wales	Valer JPK 10.30	10.30	Jiang Lin; Francois Guiffant	3:22:43:48
56	2400	Avalanche (DH)	New South Wales	Hick 40	12.30	James Murchison; James Francis	3:22:45:30
57	S13	Dasher+Fisher How Bizarre	(Victoria (state)) Victoria	Reichel Pugh SeaQuest RP36	10.93	Scott Robinson	3:23:37:29
58	SM377	Bacardi	(Victoria (state)) Victoria	Peterson 44	13.34	Brett Averay	4:00:07:49
59	7204	Roaring Forty (DH)	New South Wales	Lutra BOC Open 40	12.20	Kevin Le Poidevin; Darrell Greig	4:01:14:56
60	AUS117	Tilting at Windmills	Tasmania	Dory Joubert Modified 42	12.80	Sarah Gunnersen-Dempsey; John Alexander	4:01:15:16
61	6661	Crystal Cutter III	New South Wales	Farr Beneteau 40.7	11.90	Charles Parry-Okeden	4:01:59:31
62	FRA85	Le Tiroflan	New South Wales	Finot Pogo 40 S2	12.18	Chris Taylor	4:02:23:32
63	RQ334	Fruit Salid 3	Queensland	Farr Beneteau First 40	12.60	Mark Drobitko	4:03:50:27
64	G69	Dark and Stormy	(Victoria (state)) Victoria	Murray Burns Dovell 37	11.60	Tobias Swanson	4:03:51:58
65	R201	Just Farr Love	Tasmania	Farr 51	15.50	Scott Lovell	4:07:14:10
66	1696	Journeyman Flat White	Queensland	Radford 12.2	12.20	Jen Linkova; Geoffrey Tomlins	4:09:56:44
67	6834	Chancellor	New South Wales	Farr Beneteau First 40	12.60	Edward Tooher	4:10:31:46
68	RQ490	Fika (DH)	Queensland	Najad 1490	14.90	Annette Hesselmans; Sophie Snijders	4:10:44:56
69	0122	Rumchaser (DH)	New South Wales	Johnstone J122e	12.20	Andrew Butler; Peter Just	5:05:20:35
70	SA982	Inukshuk (DH)	South Australia	Kaufman Northshore 38	11.60	Robert Large; Stuart Watson	5:05:47:23
71	NZL6702	Silver Fern	Queensland	Bakewell-White Birdsall 72	21.30	David Hows	5:10:11:46
72	4876	Blue Moon (DH)	Tasmania	Adams 16.4	16.40	Ken & Tristan Gourlay	5:10:23:01
73	AUS1	Kismet (DH)	New South Wales	Illingworth-Penrose 30	9.30	Sean Langman; Peter Inchbold	5:16:05:23
74	GBR5672L	Salt Lines	New South Wales	Giles Shipwright 70	21.00	Matthew Harvey	5:21:04:13
DNF	52566	Alive	Tasmania	Reichel Pugh 66	20.10	Philip Turner; Duncan Hine	Retired-Engine Issues
DNF	USA1180	Bacchanal	United States	Valek JPK 11.80	11.80	Ronald Epstein	Retired-Broken Boom
DNF	AUS110	Blue Planet (DH)	New South Wales	Johnstone J99	9.90	Chris O'Neill; Michael 'Tom' Johnson	Retired-Loss of Communications
DNF	10447	Bowline	South Australia	Farr Beneteau First 44.7	13.40	Ian Roberts	Retired-Crew Member Fatality
DNF	7777	Calibre 12	New South Wales	Farr Cookson 12	12.00	Richard Williams	Retired-Mainsail Damage
DNF	NED5900	Celeste (DH)	Queensland	Sparkman & Stephens Nautor Swan 38	11.70	Saskia Groen-In't-Woud; Maud Demazure	Retired-Running Rigging Damage
DNF	9535	Centennial 7	Philippines	Judel Vrolijk TP52	15.85	Ernesto Echauz	Retired-Mainsail Damage
DNF	SM888	Ciao Bella	New South Wales	Judel Vrolijk Hanse 505	15.00	Karl Onslow; Simon Hanning	Retired-Steering Issues
DNF	B47	Cyan Moon	(Victoria (state)) Victoria	Finot Beneteau Oceanis 473	14.30	Wayne Arnold Seaward	Retired-Battery Issues
DNF	7551	Flying Fish Arctos	New South Wales	Radford McIntyre 55	15.36	George Martin	Retired-Crew Member Fatality
DNF	6333	Georgia Express	New South Wales	Farr Mumm 36	10.90	Sebastian Hultin	Retired-Electrical Issues
DNF	99	Gizmo (DH)	New South Wales	Andrieu Jeanneau Sunfast 3600	10.80	Meg Niblett; Wendy Tuck	Retired-Crew Member Illness
DNF	S118	Lord Jiminy (DH)	(Victoria (state)) Victoria	Verdier Class 40	12.00	Kevin Curtis; Jim Oosterweghel	Retired-Crew Member Injury
DNF	CYC8	Maritimo Katwinchar	New South Wales	Watney 32 Ketch	10.00	Michael Spies; Peter Vaiciurgis	Retired-Hull Damage
DNF	CAY007	Master Lock Comanche	New South Wales	Verdier VPLP 100 Supermaxi	30.48	Matt Allen; James Mayo	Retired-Mainsail Damage
DNF	M16	Mayfair	Queensland	Rogers 46	14.00	James Irvine	Retired-Broken Equipment
DNF	5656	Mondo	New South Wales	Murray Burns Dovell Sydney 38	11.80	Lisa Callaghan; Stephen Teudt	Retired-Rigging Damage
DNF	020	Philosopher	New South Wales	Murray Burns Dovell Sydney 36 CR	11.30	Michael Tilden	Retired-Dismasted
DNF	5299	Porco Rosso	Tasmania	Farr Cookson 50	15.20	Paul McCarthy	Retired-Crew Member Overboard, Later Rescued
DNF	545	Pretty Woman	New South Wales	Farr IC 45 Mod	13.80	Richard Hudson	Retired-Headstay Foil Damage
DNF	2001	Quetzalcoatl	New South Wales	Jones 40	12.33	Anthony Bruce; James Lee-Warner; Antony Sweetapple	Retired-Crew Member Injury
DNF	1808	Rum Rebellion (TH)	New South Wales	Johnstone J99	9.90	Shane Connelly; Tony Sutton	Retired-Equipment Damage
DNF	6232	Sailor Moon (DH)	(Victoria (state)) Victoria	Jutson Northshore 370	11.30	Christopher Canty; Shona Forsyth	Retired-GPS/Auto Pilot Issues
DNF	7027	The Goat	New South Wales	Murray Burns Dovell Sydney 38	11.80	Mitchell Gordon	Retired-Crew Member Injury
DNF	154	The Shepherd Centre	New South Wales	Murray Burns Dovell Sydney 36 S	11.00	Hugh Torode	Retired-Engine Issues
DNF	AUS3300	Transcendence Rudy Project (DH)	New South Wales	Andrieu Jeanneau Sunfast 3300	10.00	Martin & John Cross	Retired-Dismasted
DNF	AUS72	URM Group	New South Wales	Reichel Pugh Maxi 72	21.80	Anthony & David Johnson	Retired-Dismasted
DNF	4411	Verite (DH)	New South Wales	Johnstone J99	9.90	Paul Beath; Teresa Mitchell	Retired-Electrical Issues
DNF	4343	Wild Oats	New South Wales	Farr 43	13.11	Gordon Smith; Stuart Byrne	Retired-Rigging Damage
DNF	AUS33	Zeus	New South Wales	Welbourn Infiniti TP52	15.85	Michael Firmin	Retired-Foil Damage

Notes

^1 – Wings were given a 90 minutes redress to be subtracted off their elapsed time under RRS Fundamental Rule 1.1 by the International Jury due to an incident where their provided assistance after a crew member from Flying Fish Arctos was struck by the boom of the yacht and subsequently died of his injuries on the first day of the race.
^2 – Poulpito were given a 45 minutes redress to be subtracted off their elapsed time under RRS Fundamental Rule 1.1 by the International Jury due to an incident where their provided assistance after a crew member from Flying Fish Arctos was struck by the boom of the yacht and subsequently died of his injuries on the first day of the race.

=== Overall Handicap ===
Pos	Division	Sail Number	Yacht	State/Country	Yacht Type	LOA (Metres)	Skipper	Corrected time d:hh:mm:ss
1	0	ITA70	Celestial V70	New South Wales	Juan-K Volvo Open 70	21.50	Sam Haynes	2:16:40:38
2	0	SYD1000	LawConnect	New South Wales	Juan Yacht Design Juan-K 100	30.48	Christian Beck	3:02:25:20
3	0	AUS1001	Wild Thing 100	Queensland	Botin-Ellis 100 Maxi	30.48	Grant Wharington; Adrian Seiffert	3:03:26:36
4	1	CAY52	Caro	New Zealand	Botin TP52	15.85	Max Klink	3:03:59:33
5	1	6952	Smuggler	New South Wales	Judel Vrolijk TP52	15.85	Sebastian Bohm	3:04:33:38
6	0	AUS13	Whisper	New South Wales	Judel Vrolijk JV62	18.90	David Griffith	3:06:00:35
7	0	AUS 98888	No Limit	New South Wales	Reichel Pugh 63	19.20	David Gotze	3:07:30:06
8	3	FRA53081	Cocody	France	Valer JPK 11.80	11.80	Richard Fromentin	3:11:25:04
9	4	1	Mistral (DH)	New South Wales	Lombard 34	10.58	Rupert Henry; Corentin Douguet	3:11:44:47
10	1	OC52	Ocean Crusaders J-Bird	Queensland	Andrews TP52	15.85	Ian & Annika Thomson	3:16:53:27
11	2	R33	Chutzpah	(Victoria (state)) Victoria	Reichel Pugh Caprice 40	12.35	Bruce Taylor	3:17:05:24
12	1	GBR2888L	Antipodes	Hong Kong	Santa Cruz 72	22.00	Geoffery Hill	3:18:08:01
13	4	ST36	Midnight Rambler	Tasmania	Murray Burns Dovell Sydney 36	10.80	Ed Psaltis	3:21:24:28
14	5	294	Love & War	New South Wales	Sparkman & Stephens S&S 47	14.21	Simon & Phillip Kurts	3:21:42:05
15	2	F45	Sirene	Western Australia	Valer JPK 45	13.80	Bill Henson	3:21:47:21
16	5	AUS99	Disko Trooper_Contender Sailcloth (DH)	New South Wales	Johnstone J99	9.90	Jules Hall; Jan Scholten	3:21:48:25
17	2	112	Voltstar Yeah Baby	New South Wales	Akilaria RC2	12.00	Louis & Marc Ryckmans	3:22:09:52
18	5	MYC99	Jupiter (DH)	New South Wales	Johnstone J99	9.90	Ian Smith; Lincoln Dews	3:23:18:03
19	2	43218	Happy Wanderer	Western Australia	Corby 49	14.90	Daniel Cannon	3:23:29:08
20	5	AUS888	Min River (DH)	New South Wales	Valer JPK 10.30	10.30	Jiang Lin; Francois Guiffant	4:00:37:29
21	5	7811	Hip-Nautic	Tasmania	Andrieu Jeanneau Sunfast 3300	10.10	Jean-Pierre Ravanat	4:01:00:33
22	5	3322	Toucan (DH)	New South Wales	Andrieu Jeanneau Sunfast 3300	10.00	Edward Curry-Hyde; Scott Robertson	4:01:00:58
23	4	6499	Supernova	New South Wales	Murray Burns Dovell Sydney 36	10.80	Alex Seja; Felicity Nelson	4:02:19:19
24	2	AUS53	Odin	New South Wales	Biscontini Beneteau First 53	17.10	Matthew Hanning	4:02:40:28
25	1	JPN4321	Active Again	Queensland	Humphreys 54	16.50	Stephanie Kerin	4:02:40:57
26	4	SM377	Bacardi	(Victoria (state)) Victoria	Peterson 44	13.34	Brett Averay	4:03:12:23
27	4	R1111	Toecutter	(Victoria (state)) Victoria	Hick 10	10.00	Robert Hick; Brad Bult	4:03:36:09
28	2	SM1245	White Noise	(Victoria (state)) Victoria	Mills M.A.T. 1245	12.45	Daniel Edwards	4:04:07:33
29	4	0404	Navy One	New South Wales	Farr Beneteau First 40	12.20	Nathan Lockhart; Mark Butler	4:04:09:30
30	4	AUS117	Tilting at Windmills	Tasmania	Dory Joubert Modified 42	12.80	Sarah Gunnersen-Dempsey; John Alexander	4:04:33:40
31	3	RQ130	Ragtime	New South Wales	Johnstone J130	13.00	Steve Watson	4:04:38:31
32	3	7709	Kanreki	New South Wales	Farr Cookson 12	12.00	Michael Rowe; Ben Martin	4:04:43:09
33	2	2527	Xanthus	New South Wales	Jeppesen X55	16.76	Matthew Fifield; Benjamin Roulant	4:04:44:56
34	3	FRA6900	Poulpito	New Caledonia	Murray Burns Dovell Sydney 38	11.80	David Treguier	4:04:46:04
35	3	3838	Clockwork	South Australia	Murray Burns Dovell Sydney 38	11.80	Andrew Lloyd; Mary Ann Harvey	4:04:57:57
36	2	07	Wings	New South Wales	Judel Vrolijk Dehler 46	14.00	Ian Edwards	4:04:58:57
37	3	8009	Trouble & Strife	Queensland	Farr Cookson 12	12.00	Matthew Williams	4:04:59:46
38	4	S13	Dasher+Fisher How Bizarre	(Victoria (state)) Victoria	Reichel Pugh SeaQuest RP36	10.93	Scott Robinson	4:05:10:15
39	3	5038	Cinquante	New South Wales	Murray Burns Dovell Sydney 38	11.80	Kim Jaggar	4:05:23:50
40	3	RQ447	Solace	Queensland	Farr Beneteau First 44.7	13.40	Paul Pincus	4:05:35:00
41	3	M133	Joker X2 (DH)	(Victoria (state)) Victoria	Johnstone J133	13.30	Grant Chipperfield; Peter Dowdney	4:05:36:43
42	3	110	Pacman (DH)	Queensland	Young 11	11.00	Peter Elkington; Scott Cavanough	4:06:20:12
43	2	11744	XS Moment	New South Wales	Jeppesen XP44	13.30	Ray Hudson	4:07:35:55
44	3	SA332	Audacious	South Australia	Murray Burns Dovell Sydney 38	11.80	Stuart Johnson	4:07:51:10
45	2	424	Minnie	New South Wales	Jones 42	12.90	Michael Bell	4:07:55:31
46	1	52569	Denali	New South Wales	Judel Vrolijk TP52	15.90	Damian Parkes	4:08:16:24
47	2	PD147	Advantedge	Tasmania	Inglis 47	14.30	Andrew Jones	4:08:49:07
48	2	2208	Tenacity	Tasmania	Mills 41	12.50	John Lawrie; Vaughan Lynch	4:10:15:49
49	2	6559	Wots Next	New South Wales	Murray Burns Dovell Sydney 47	14.20	Charles Cupit	4:10:25:35
50	4	RQ334	Fruit Salid 3	Queensland	Farr Beneteau First 40	12.60	Mark Drobitko	4:10:37:48
51	2	2400	Avalanche (DH)	New South Wales	Hick 40	12.30	James Murchison; James Francis	4:10:47:34
52	2	1195	Quantock	New South Wales	Elliott 13 Mod	13.00	David & Alison Hobbs	4:13:29:29
53	2	211	Indigo II	Queensland	Reichel Pugh Marten 49	15.10	Darryn Purdy	4:15:07:16
54	5	AUS1	Kismet (DH)	New South Wales	Illingworth-Penrose 30	9.30	Sean Langman; Peter Inchbold	4:20:29:34
55	2	7204	Roaring Forty (DH)	New South Wales	Lutra BOC Open 40	12.20	Kevin Le Poidevin; Darrell Greig	4:23:48:38
56	5	SA982	Inukshuk (DH)	South Australia	Kaufman Northshore 38	11.60	Robert Large; Stuart Watson	5:03:39:05
DNF	0	52566	Alive	Tasmania	Reichel Pugh 66	20.10	Philip Turner; Duncan Hine	Retired-Engine Issues
DNF	3	USA1180	Bacchanal	United States	Valek JPK 11.80	11.80	Ronald Epstein	Retired-Broken Boom
DNF	5	AUS110	Blue Planet (DH)	New South Wales	Johnstone J99	9.90	Chris O'Neill; Michael 'Tom' Johnson	Retired-Loss of Communications
DNF	3	10447	Bowline	South Australia	Farr Beneteau First 44.7	13.40	Ian Roberts	Retired-Crew Member Fatality
DNF	2	7777	Calibre 12	New South Wales	Farr Cookson 12	12.00	Richard Williams	Retired-Mainsail Damage
DNF	1	9535	Centennial 7	Philippines	Judel Vrolijk TP52	15.85	Ernesto Echauz	Retired-Mainsail Damage
DNF	3	6333	Georgia Express	New South Wales	Farr Mumm 36	10.90	Sebastian Hultin	Retired-Electrical Issues
DNF	4	99	Gizmo (DH)	New South Wales	Andrieu Jeanneau Sunfast 3600	10.80	Meg Niblett; Wendy Tuck	Retired-Crew Member Illness
DNF	5	CYC8	Maritimo Katwinchar	New South Wales	Watney 32 Ketch	10.00	Michael Spies; Peter Vaiciurgis	Retired-Hull Damage
DNF	0	CAY007	Master Lock Comanche	New South Wales	Verdier VPLP 100 Supermaxi	30.48	Matt Allen; James Mayo	Retired-Mainsail Damage
DNF	2	M16	Mayfair	Queensland	Rogers 46	14.00	James Irvine	Retired-Broken Equipment
DNF	3	5656	Mondo	New South Wales	Murray Burns Dovell Sydney 38	11.80	Lisa Callaghan; Stephen Teudt	Retired-Rigging Damage
DNF	4	020	Philosopher	New South Wales	Murray Burns Dovell Sydney 36 CR	11.30	Michael Tilden	Retired-Dismasted
DNF	1	5299	Porco Rosso	Tasmania	Farr Cookson 50	15.20	Paul McCarthy	Retired-Crew Member Overboard; Subsequently Rescued
DNF	2	545	Pretty Woman	New South Wales	Farr IC 45 Mod	13.80	Richard Hudson	Retired-Headstay Foil Damage
DNF	5	1808	Rum Rebellion (TH)	New South Wales	Johnstone J99	9.90	Shane Connelly; Tony Sutton	Retired-Equipment Damage
DNF	3	7027	The Goat	New South Wales	Murray Burns Dovell Sydney 38	11.80	Mitchell Gordon	Retired-Crew Member Injury
DNF	4	154	The Shepherd Centre	New South Wales	Murray Burns Dovell Sydney 36 S	11.00	Hugh Torode	Retired-Engine Issues
DNF	5	AUS3300	Transcendence Rudy Project (DH)	New South Wales	Andrieu Jeanneau Sunfast 3300	10.00	Martin & John Cross	Retired-Dismasted
DNF	0	AUS72	URM Group	New South Wales	Reichel Pugh Maxi 72	21.80	Anthony & David Johnson	Retired-Dismasted
DNF	5	4411	Verite (DH)	New South Wales	Johnstone J99	9.90	Paul Beath; Teresa Mitchell	Retired-Electrical Issues
DNF	1	AUS33	Zeus	New South Wales	Welbourn Infiniti TP52	15.85	Michael Firmin	Retired-Foil Damage
