= 2015 Sydney to Hobart Yacht Race =

2015 annual yacht race in Australia

71st Sydney to Hobart Yacht Race
Event information
- Type: Yacht
- Dates: 26–31 December 2015
- Sponsor: Rolex
- Host city: Sydney, Hobart
- Boats: 108
- Distance: 628 nautical miles (1,163 km)
- Website: Website archive

Results
- Winner (2015): Comanche (Ken Read)

Succession
- Previous: Wild Oats XI (Mark Richards) in 2014
- Next: Perpetual Loyal (Anthony Bell, Tom Slingsby) in 2016

The 2015 Sydney to Hobart Yacht Race, sponsored by Rolex and hosted by the Cruising Yacht Club of Australia in Sydney, New South Wales, was the 71st annual running of the "blue water classic." The 2015 edition began on Sydney Harbour at 1pm on Boxing Day (26 December 2015), before heading south for 628 nautical miles (1,163 km) through the Tasman Sea, past Bass Strait, into Storm Bay and up the River Derwent, to cross the finish line in Hobart, Tasmania. There were 108 starters; 77 finished.

Line honours were claimed by Comanche in a time of 2 days, 8 hours, 58 minutes and 30 seconds. The crew of Balance (Paul Clitheroe) were awarded the Tattersall's Cup.

== Results ==
=== Line Honours ===
Pos	Sail Number	Yacht	State/Country	Yacht Type	LOA (Metres)	Skipper	Elapsed time d:hh:mm:ss
1	12358	Comanche	United States	Verdier VPLP 100 Supermaxi	30.48	Ken Read	2:08:58:30
2	SYD100	Ragamuffin 100	New South Wales	Dovell 100	30.48	Syd Fischer	2:19:47:30
3	USA25555	Rambler 88	United States	Juan-K JK 27m Canting Maxi	27.00	George David	2:19:51:42
4	ITA70	Maserati	Italy	Juan-K Volvo Open 70	21.50	Giovanni Soldini	2:22:54:33
5	AUS13	Chinese Whisper	New South Wales	Judel Vrolijk JV62	18.90	Rupert Henry	3:00:18:01
6	AUS01	Ichi Ban	New South Wales	Carkeek 60	18.30	Matt Allen	3:00:29:37
7	7771	Balance	New South Wales	Farr TP 52	15.85	Paul Clitheroe	3:03:50:45
8	S777	Primitive Cool	(Victoria (state)) Victoria	Reichel Pugh RP51	15.61	John Newbold	3:06:51:00
9	6952	Celestial	New South Wales	Judel Vrolijk TP 52	15.85	Sam Haynes	3:17:22:02
10	FRA38757	Teasing Machine	France	Nivelt Archambault A13	13.10	Eric de Turckheim	3:20:18:44
11	AUS47	Indian	Western Australia	Carkeek 47	14.30	Craig Carter	3:21:22:48
12	AUS70	Ragamuffin 52	New South Wales	Farr TP 52	15.85	Brenton Fischer	3:21:22:54 ^{1}
13	YC45	Concubine	South Australia	Mills 45	13.70	Jason Ward	4:01:22:02
14	A5	Yeah Baby	New South Wales	Welbourn 50	15.20	Pavel Kuznetsov; Marc Ryckmans	4:01:33:36
15	R33	Chutzpah	(Victoria (state)) Victoria	Reichel Pugh Caprice 40	12.35	Bruce Taylor	4:01:44:41
16	93	Merlin	New South Wales	Forbes-Kaiko 52	15.60	David Forbes; Joseph Earl	4:02:02:00
17	262	Helsal 3	Tasmania	Adams 20	20.00	Paul Mara; Rob Fisher	4:02:03:16
18	B45	Rush	(Victoria (state)) Victoria	Farr 45	13.81	John Paterson	4:02:07:12
19	421	The Goat	New South Wales	Mills Rogers 46	14.02	Sebastian Bohm; Bruce Foye	4:02:23:02
20	RQ64	Ocean Affinity	Queensland	Reichel Pugh Marten 49	15.00	Stewart Lewis	4:02:51:49
21	B330	Hartbreaker	(Victoria (state)) Victoria	Reichel Pugh 46	14.20	Antony Walton; Alan Breidahl	4:02:59:21
22	GBR725X	Da Nang-Vietnam	(United Kingdom) Great Britain	Castro Clipper 70	21.33	Wendy Tuck	4:03:01:33
23	7007	Maxi Ragamuffin	Queensland	Frers Maxi	24.40	Keith Batt	4:03:41:12
24	ESP6100	Duende	New South Wales	Judel Vrolijk TP 52	15.39	Damien Parkes	4:03:52:16
25	35	Imagination	New South Wales	Farr Beneteau First 47.7	14.50	Robin & Annette Hawthorn	4:04:09:17
26	GBR727X	GREAT Britain	(United Kingdom) Great Britain	Castro Clipper 70	21.33	Peter Thornton	4:04:22:20
27	GBR6210L	Uxorious IV	(United Kingdom) Great Britain	Swan 62 FD	18.90	Colin Buffin	4:04:22:45
28	GBR724X	LMAX Exchange	(United Kingdom) Great Britain	Castro Clipper 70	21.33	Olivier Cardin	4:04:39:24
29	GBR726X	Clipper Telemed+	(United Kingdom) Great Britain	Castro Clipper 70	21.33	Matthew Mitchell	4:04:58:35
30	GBR720X	Garmin	(United Kingdom) Great Britain	Castro Clipper 70	21.33	Ashley Skett	4:05:03:34
31	GBR723X	Visit Seattle	(United Kingdom) Great Britain	Castro Clipper 70	21.33	Huw Fernie	4:05:09:07
32	GBR731X	Mission Performance	(United Kingdom) Great Britain	Castro Clipper 70	21.33	Greg Miller	4:05:13:48
33	8778	After Midnight	New South Wales	Farr 40 Mod	12.40	Mark & Greg Tobin	4:05:14:16
34	GBR729X	Derry-Londonderry-Doire	(United Kingdom) Great Britain	Castro Clipper 70	21.33	Daniel Smith	4:05:16:35
35	8338	Midnight Rambler	New South Wales	Ker 40	12.20	Bob Thomas; Ed Psaltis; Michael Bencsik	4:05:27:43
36	FRA39337	Courier Leon	France	Valer-JPK 10.80	10.80	Gery Trentesaux	4:05:28:53
37	GBR730X	Unicef	(United Kingdom) Great Britain	Castro Clipper 70	21.33	Martin Clough	4:05:38:17
38	NZL1	Mahligai	New South Wales	Murray Burns Dovell Sydney 46	14.30	Murray Owen; Jenny Kings	4:05:40:09
39	MH60	TSA Management	New South Wales	Murray Burns Dovell Sydney 38	11.80	Tony Levett	4:05:47:25
40	GBR728X	Qingdao	(United Kingdom) Great Britain	Castro Clipper 70	21.33	Robert Beggs	4:06:06:51
41	W1424	Mayfair	Queensland	Farr Beneteau First 40	12.20	James Irvine	4:06:07:29
42	7878	Kayle-Sailors with disAbilities	New South Wales	Lyons 54	16.20	David Pescud; John Whitfield	4:06:20:15
43	33345	Black Sheep	New South Wales	Briand Beneteau 45	13.70	Derek & Martin Sheppard	4:06:38:39
44	NED6572	King's Legend	Netherlands	Sparkmans & Stephens Swan 65	19.00	Gijs Van Liebergen	4:06:41:02
45	4343	Wild Rose	New South Wales	Farr 43	13.11	Roger Hickman	4:06:45:55
46	5612	Abracadabra	New South Wales	Tripp 47	14.33	James Murchison	4:07:18:29
47	248	Wax Lyrical	New South Wales	Jeppesen X50	15.20	Les Goodridge	4:07:22:13
48	RQ2404	Not A Diamond	Queensland	Farr Beneteau First 40	12.30	David Redfern	4:07:37:13
49	9359T	Clipper Ventures 10	South Australia	Dubois Clipper 68	20.77	Gregor McGowan	4:07:44:10
50	9327	IQ Komodo	New South Wales	Farr 40	12.40	Andrew Butler	4:07:57:17
51	7777	Calibre	New South Wales	Murray Burns Dovell Sydney 38	11.80	Richard Williams	4:08:48:17
52	9354T	Clipper Ventures 5	South Australia	Dubois Clipper 68	20.77	Drew Hulton-Smith	4:08:49:36
53	SM28	Challenge	(Victoria (state)) Victoria	Murray Burns Dovell Sydney 38	11.80	Chris Mrakas	4:09:48:29
54	N11	Climate Action Now	New South Wales	Hick 50	15.25	Lisa Blair	4:13:19:51
55	6723	Allegro	New South Wales	Warwick 67	20.30	Adrian Lewis	4:14:53:45
56	GER6300	Haspa Hamburg	Germany	Judel Vrolijk JV52	15.85	Johan Schultz	4:15:55:10
57	6841	Papillon	New South Wales	Joubert-Nivelt Archambault 40RC	12.00	Phil Molony	4:16:03:20
58	11407	Pelagic Magic	New South Wales	Farr Beneteau 40.7	11.90	Simon Dunlop	4:16:05:51
59	GBR722X	PSP Logistics	(United Kingdom) Great Britain	Castro Clipper 70	21.33	Max Stunell	4:16:07:34
60	B10	Cartouche	(Victoria (state)) Victoria	Briand Beneteau First 50	15.00	Steven Fahey	4:16:08:59
61	370	She's The Culprit	New South Wales	Inglis-Jones 39 Modified	12.00	Glen Picasso	4:16:30:04
62	335	Willyama	New South Wales	Farr Beneteau First 40	12.20	Richard Barron; Stephen San Lorenzo	4:16:33:33
63	8975	Last Tango	New South Wales	J&J Yachts Salona 44	13.60	Phillip King	4:16:37:38
64	B45	Scamp	Queensland	Briand Beneteau First 45	14.10	Mike & Angela Mollison	4:16:39:04
65	8565	Ugg Australia	New South Wales	Sparkman & Stephens Swan 65	20.00	Steve Capell	4:17:12:19
66	8824	Chancellor	New South Wales	Farr Beneteau 47.7	14.80	Edward Tooher	4:17:33:43
67	GBR3901L	Discoverer of Hornet	(United Kingdom) Great Britain	Devonport Challenge 72	21.90	Phil Caswell	4:18:10:14
68	Q999	Another Fiasco	Queensland	Jutson 43	12.60	Damian Suckling	4:18:14:45
69	GBR721X	Ichor Coal	(United Kingdom) Great Britain	Castro Clipper 70	21.33	Darren Ladd	4:18:17:53
70	MH777	Patrice Six	New South Wales	Jeppesen X41	12.50	Shaun Lane	4:18:34:23
71	4966	King Billy	New South Wales	King Custom 38	11.50	Phil Bennett	4:18:35:49
72	3430	Quikpoint Azzurro	New South Wales	Sparkman & Stephens S&S 34	10.10	Shane Kearns	4:18:37:59
73	GBR3900L	Adventure of Hornet	(United Kingdom) Great Britain	Devonport Challenge 72	21.90	Rebecca Walford	4:18:44:38
74	SA346	Enchantress	South Australia	Muirhead 11	11.00	John Willoughby	4:20:06:22
75	7551	Flying Fish Arctos	New South Wales	Radford McIntyre 55	15.36	Jason Cummings	4:20:45:16
76	CHN53007	Shuguang Haiyang	China	Lombard Sun Odyssey 42i	12.90	Roy Pan; Dong Qing	5:02:27:14
77	SM16	Myuna III	(Victoria (state)) Victoria	Davidson Cavalier 37	11.90	Geoffrey Nixon	5:20:09:30
DNF	JPN5095	Ark323	China	Botin & Carkeek TP 52	15.85	Chuanbao Zhao	Retired-Cracked Deck
DNF	R40	Avalanche	(Victoria (state)) Victoria	Hick 40	12.30	Hugh Ellis; Gary Caulfield	Retired-Undisclosed Reasons
DNF	52570	Black Jack	Queensland	Juan-K Volvo Open 70	21.50	Mark Bradford	Retired-Crew Injury
DNF	10000	Brindabella	New South Wales	Jutson 80	24.08	Jim Cooney	Retired-Mainsail Damage
DNF	9550	CEX Dolce	New South Wales	Inglis 47 Mod	14.30	Pierre Gal	Retired-Broken Mast
DNF	4527	China Easyway	New South Wales	King Jarkan 12.5	12.70	Travis Read; Wei Hua Pan	Retired-Sail Damage
DNF	5200	Cougar II	Tasmania	Farr TP 52	15.85	Anthony Lyall	Retired-Broken Transom ^{2}
DNF	RF9095	Dare Devil	New South Wales	Farr Cookson 47	14.30	Sibby Ilzhofer	Retired-Rudder Damage
DNF	RQ432	Dekadence	Queensland	Mills DK46	14.10	Stephanie Kerin	Retired-Electrical Problems
DNF	GBR5211L	Frantic	New South Wales	Donovan TP 52	15.85	Michael Martin	Retired-Torn Mainsail
DNF	6343	Great Xpectations	New South Wales	Jeppesen X43	12.94	Rod Wills	Retired-Undisclosed Reasons
DNF	6953	GYR Wot Eva	(United Kingdom) Great Britain	Nelson Marek TP 52	15.85	Andy Middleton	Retired-Undisclosed Reasons
DNF	AUS8899	Hollywood Boulevard	New South Wales	Farr 55	16.76	Ray Roberts	Retired-Hull Damage
DNF	R39	Jaffa	Western Australia	Runnalls 39	12.00	Terry Posma	Retired-Engine Problems
DNF	JPN4321	KLC Bengal 7	Japan	Humphreys 54	16.46	Yoshihiko Murase	Retired-Mainsail Damage
DNF	52152	Koa	New South Wales	Farr TP 52	15.85	Peter Wrigley; Andrew Kearnan	Retired-Steering Damage
DNF	554	Landfall	New South Wales	Sparkman & Stephens S&S 54	13.40	Michael Strong	Retired-Hull Damage
DNF	1236	Local Hero	New South Wales	Murray Burns Dovell BH36	10.97	Peter Mosely; Matthew Bassett	Retired-Minor Hull Damage
DNF	GBR23N	Lupa of London	(United Kingdom) Great Britain	Reichel Pugh RP78	23.95	Jeremy Pilkington	Retired-Bow Damage ^{2}
DNF	AUS52	M3	Western Australia	Farr TP 52	15.85	Peter Hickson; Brent Fowler	Retired-Broken Forestay
DNF	360	Patrice	New South Wales	Ker 46	13.90	Tony Kirby	Retired-Mainsail Damage
DNF	99	Pazazz	New South Wales	Farr Cookson 12	11.90	Rob Drury	Retired-Mainsail Damage
DNF	SYD1000	Perpetual Loyal	New South Wales	Juan Yacht Design Juan-K 100	30.48	Anthony Bell	Retired-Rudder Damage
DNF	10007	Pretty Fly III	New South Wales	Farr Cookson 50	15.24	Colin Woods	Retired-Broken Forestay
DNF	88888	Samurai Jack	Queensland	Farr 39ml Mod	12.00	Michael Lazzarini	Retired-Sail Damage
DNF	6686	St Jude	New South Wales	Murray Burns Dovell Sydney 47	14.20	Noel Cornish	Retired-Rudder Damage
DNF	6891	Takani	New South Wales	Judel Vrolijk Hanse 495	15.40	James Whittle	Retired-Rudder Damage
DNF	6377	Triton	New South Wales	Lyons-Cawse LC60	18.30	Michael Cranitch; David Gotze	Retired-Mainsail Damage
DNF	B1	Trybooking.com	(Victoria (state)) Victoria	Dixon Moody DS54	17.20	Grant Dunoon	Retired-Damage to Bow Thruster
DNF	AUS5299	Victoire	New South Wales	Farr Cookson 50	15.24	Darryl Hodgkinson	Retired-Crew Member Injury
DNF	10001	Wild Oats XI	New South Wales	Reichel Pugh 100	30.48	Mark Richards	Retired-Mainsail Damage

Notes

^1 – Ragamuffin 52 were given a 20% penalty to be added onto their elapsed time by the International Jury due to breaching RRS Rule 19.2(b) in a collision with Ark323 at the start of the race in Sydney Harbour.
^2 – Mutual protest by both boats after a collision between them at the start of the race in Sydney Harbour. Cougar II was found to have failed as port tack boat to keep clear of Lupa of London but as both boats had retired no penalty could be applied.

=== Overall Handicap ===
Pos	Division Number	Sail Number	Yacht	State/Country	Yacht Type	LOA (Metres)	Skipper	Elapsed time d:hh:mm:ss
1	1	7771	Balance	New South Wales	Farr TP 52	15.85	Paul Clitheroe	4:07:27:13
2	4	FRA39337	Courier Leon	France	Valer-JPK 10.80	10.80	Gery Trentesaux	4:10:02:53
3	4	3430	Quikpoint Azzurro	New South Wales	Sparkman & Stephens S&S 34	10.10	Shane Kearns	4:10:09:01
4	1	S777	Primitive Cool	(Victoria (state)) Victoria	Reichel Pugh RP51	15.61	John Newbold	4:10:36:19
5	0	AUS13	Chinese Whisper	New South Wales	Judel Vrolijk JV62	18.90	Rupert Henry	4:11:39:18
6	4	4343	Wild Rose	New South Wales	Farr 43	13.11	Roger Hickman	4:11:41:53
7	3	FRA38757	Teasing Machine	France	Nivelt Archambault A13	13.10	Eric de Turckheim	4:11:54:47
8	0	AUS01	Ichi Ban	New South Wales	Carkeek 60	18.30	Matt Allen	4:12:48:46
9	4	W1424	Mayfair	Queensland	Farr Beneteau First 40	12.20	James Irvine	4:14:29:56
10	3	35	Imagination	New South Wales	Farr Beneteau First 47.7	14.50	Robin & Annette Hawthorn	4:14:58:55
11	4	MH60	TSA Management	New South Wales	Murray Burns Dovell Sydney 38	11.80	Tony Levett	4:15:58:10
12	4	RQ2404	Not A Diamond	Queensland	Farr Beneteau First 40	12.30	David Redfern	4:16:13:15
13	0	12358	Comanche	United States	Verdier VPLP 100 Supermaxi	30.48	Ken Read	4:16:48:38
14	4	4966	King Billy	New South Wales	King Custom 38	11.50	Phil Bennett	4:16:59:33
15	3	33345	Black Sheep	New South Wales	Briand Beneteau 45	13.70	Derek & Martin Sheppard	4:18:02:16
16	4	7777	Calibre	New South Wales	Murray Burns Dovell Sydney 38	11.80	Richard Williams	4:19:35:59
17	3	8778	After Midnight	New South Wales	Farr 40 Mod	12.40	Mark & Greg Tobin	4:19:55:02
18	3	R33	Chutzpah	(Victoria (state)) Victoria	Reichel Pugh Caprice 40	12.35	Bruce Taylor	4:20:30:42
19	4	SM28	Challenge	(Victoria (state)) Victoria	Murray Burns Dovell Sydney 38	11.80	Chris Mrakas	4:20:48:44
20	3	NED6572	King's Legend	Netherlands	Sparkmans & Stephens Swan 65	19.00	Gijs Van Liebergen	4:20:51:15
21	4	11407	Pelagic Magic	New South Wales	Farr Beneteau 40.7	11.90	Simon Dunlop	4:22:15:46
22	0	ITA70	Maserati	Italy	Juan-K Volvo Open 70	21.50	Giovanni Soldini	4:22:37:52
23	4	SA346	Enchantress	South Australia	Muirhead 11	11.00	John Willoughby	4:22:53:34
24	2	B45	Rush	(Victoria (state)) Victoria	Farr 45	13.81	John Paterson	4:23:01:10
25	2	93	Merlin	New South Wales	Forbes-Kaiko 52	15.60	David Forbes; Joseph Earl	4:23:47:48
26	3	8338	Midnight Rambler	New South Wales	Ker 40	12.20	Bob Thomas; Ed Psaltis; Michael Bencsik	5:00:26:07
27	3	9327	IQ Komodo	New South Wales	Farr 40	12.40	Andrew Butler	5:00:35:15
28	4	6841	Papillon	New South Wales	Joubert-Nivelt Archambault 40RC	12.00	Phil Molony	5:01:21:22
29	1	6952	Celestial	New South Wales	Judel Vrolijk TP 52	15.85	Sam Haynes	5:01:59:11
30	2	GBR6210L	Uxorious IV	(United Kingdom) Great Britain	Swan 62 FD	18.90	Colin Buffin	5:02:45:49
31	4	8565	Ugg Australia	New South Wales	Sparkman & Stephens Swan 65	20.00	Steve Capell	5:02:56:27
32	0	USA25555	Rambler 88	United States	Juan-K JK 27m Canting Maxi	27.00	George David	5:03:54:55
33	3	B10	Cartouche	(Victoria (state)) Victoria	Briand Beneteau First 50	15.00	Steven Fahey	5:03:55:32
34	2	421	The Goat	New South Wales	Mills Rogers 46	14.02	Sebastian Bohm; Bruce Foye	5:04:21:26
35	1	AUS47	Indian	Western Australia	Carkeek 47	14.30	Craig Carter	5:04:34:08
36	2	A5	Yeah Baby	New South Wales	Welbourn 50	15.20	Pavel Kuznetsov; Marc Ryckmans	5:04:58:28
37	2	9359T	Clipper Ventures 10	South Australia	Dubois Clipper 68	20.77	Gregor McGowan	5:05:06:21
38	1	AUS70	Ragamuffin 52	New South Wales	Farr TP 52	15.85	Brenton Fischer	5:05:35:34
39	1	YC45	Concubine	South Australia	Mills 45	13.70	Jason Ward	5:06:22:58
40	2	9354T	Clipper Ventures 5	South Australia	Dubois Clipper 68	20.77	Drew Hulton-Smith	5:06:25:15
41	2	B330	Hartbreaker	(Victoria (state)) Victoria	Reichel Pugh 46	14.20	Antony Walton; Alan Breidahl	5:06:36:26
42	3	8824	Chancellor	New South Wales	Farr Beneteau 47.7	14.80	Edward Tooher	5:06:50:55
43	3	MH777	Patrice Six	New South Wales	Jeppesen X41	12.50	Shaun Lane	5:07:10:34
44	2	GBR725X	Da Nang-Vietnam	(United Kingdom) Great Britain	Castro Clipper 70	21.33	Wendy Tuck	5:07:44:36
45	2	GBR727X	GREAT Britain	(United Kingdom) Great Britain	Castro Clipper 70	21.33	Peter Thornton	5:09:28:49
46	2	GBR724X	LMAX Exchange	(United Kingdom) Great Britain	Castro Clipper 70	21.33	Olivier Cardin	5:09:50:50
47	2	GBR726X	Clipper Telemed+	(United Kingdom) Great Britain	Castro Clipper 70	21.33	Matthew Mitchell	5:10:15:34
48	2	GBR720X	Garmin	(United Kingdom) Great Britain	Castro Clipper 70	21.33	Ashley Skett	5:10:22:00
49	2	GBR723X	Visit Seattle	(United Kingdom) Great Britain	Castro Clipper 70	21.33	Huw Fernie	5:10:29:10
50	2	GBR731X	Mission Performance	(United Kingdom) Great Britain	Castro Clipper 70	21.33	Greg Miller	5:10:35:12
51	2	GBR729X	Derry-Londonderry-Doire	(United Kingdom) Great Britain	Castro Clipper 70	21.33	Daniel Smith	5:10:38:48
52	0	SYD100	Ragamuffin 100	New South Wales	Dovell 100	30.48	Syd Fischer	5:10:46:12
53	2	GBR730X	Unicef	(United Kingdom) Great Britain	Castro Clipper 70	21.33	Martin Clough	5:11:06:47
54	2	GBR728X	Qingdao	(United Kingdom) Great Britain	Castro Clipper 70	21.33	Robert Beggs	5:11:43:38
55	2	GBR3900L	Adventure of Hornet	(United Kingdom) Great Britain	Devonport Challenge 72	21.90	Rebecca Walford	5:15:30:45
56	2	GBR3901L	Discoverer of Hornet	(United Kingdom) Great Britain	Devonport Challenge 72	21.90	Phil Caswell	5:16:39:44
57	2	GBR722X	PSP Logistics	(United Kingdom) Great Britain	Castro Clipper 70	21.33	Max Stunell	6:00:38:34
58	1	GER6300	Haspa Hamburg	Germany	Judel Vrolijk JV52	15.85	Johan Schultz	6:02:23:26
59	2	GBR721X	Ichor Coal	(United Kingdom) Great Britain	Castro Clipper 70	21.33	Darren Ladd	6:03:26:40
DNF	1	JPN5095	Ark323	China	Botin & Carkeek TP 52	15.85	Chuanbao Zhao	Retired-Cracked Deck
DNF	3	R40	Avalanche	(Victoria (state)) Victoria	Hick 40	12.30	Hugh Ellis; Gary Caulfield	Retired-Undisclosed Reasons
DNF	0	52570	Black Jack	Queensland	Juan-K Volvo Open 70	21.50	Mark Bradford	Retired-Crew Injury
DNF	2	9550	CEX Dolce	New South Wales	Inglis 47 Mod	14.30	Pierre Gal	Retired-Broken Mast
DNF	4	4527	China Easyway	New South Wales	King Jarkan 12.5	12.70	Travis Read; Wei Hua Pan	Retired-Sail Damage
DNF	1	5200	Cougar II	Tasmania	Farr TP 52	15.85	Anthony Lyall	Retired-Broken Transom
DNF	2	RF9095	Dare Devil	New South Wales	Farr Cookson 47	14.30	Sibby Ilzhofer	Retired-Rudder Damage
DNF	3	RQ432	Dekadence	Queensland	Mills DK46	14.10	Stephanie Kerin	Retired-Electrical Problems
DNF	1	GBR5211L	Frantic	New South Wales	Donovan TP 52	15.85	Michael Martin	Retired-Torn Mainsail
DNF	4	6343	Great Xpectations	New South Wales	Jeppesen X43	12.94	Rod Wills	Retired-Undisclosed Reasons
DNF	1	AUS8899	Hollywood Boulevard	New South Wales	Farr 55	16.76	Ray Roberts	Retired-Hull Damage
DNF	3	R39	Jaffa	Western Australia	Runnalls 39	12.00	Terry Posma	Retired-Engine Problems
DNF	1	JPN4321	KLC Bengal 7	Japan	Humphreys 54	16.46	Yoshihiko Murase	Retired-Mainsail Damage
DNF	1	52152	Koa	New South Wales	Farr TP 52	15.85	Peter Wrigley; Andrew Kearnan	Retired-Steering Damage
DNF	4	1236	Local Hero	New South Wales	Murray Burns Dovell BH36	10.97	Peter Mosely; Matthew Bassett	Retired-Minor Hull Damage
DNF	0	GBR23N	Lupa of London	(United Kingdom) Great Britain	Reichel Pugh RP78	23.95	Jeremy Pilkington	Retired-Bow Damage
DNF	1	AUS52	M3	Western Australia	Farr TP 52	15.85	Peter Hickson; Brent Fowler	Retired-Broken Forestay
DNF	2	360	Patrice	New South Wales	Ker 46	13.90	Tony Kirby	Retired-Mainsail Damage
DNF	3	99	Pazazz	New South Wales	Farr Cookson 12	11.90	Rob Drury	Retired-Mainsail Damage
DNF	0	SYD1000	Perpetual Loyal	New South Wales	Juan Yacht Design Juan-K 100	30.48	Anthony Bell	Retired-Rudder Damage
DNF	0	10007	Pretty Fly III	New South Wales	Farr Cookson 50	15.24	Colin Woods	Retired-Broken Forestay
DNF	3	6686	St Jude	New South Wales	Murray Burns Dovell Sydney 47	14.20	Noel Cornish	Retired-Rudder Damage
DNF	1	6377	Triton	New South Wales	Lyons-Cawse LC60	18.30	Michael Cranitch; David Gotze	Retired-Mainsail Damage
DNF	0	AUS5299	Victoire	New South Wales	Farr Cookson 50	15.24	Darryl Hodgkinson	Retired-Crew Member Injury
DNF	0	10001	Wild Oats XI	New South Wales	Reichel Pugh 100	30.48	Mark Richards	Retired-Mainsail Damage
