= 2016 Sydney to Hobart Yacht Race =

2016 annual yacht race in Australia

72nd Sydney to Hobart Yacht Race
Event information
- Type: Yacht
- Dates: 26–31 December 2016
- Sponsor: Rolex
- Host city: Sydney, Hobart
- Boats: 88
- Distance: 628 nautical miles (1,163 km)
- Website: Website archive

Results
- Winner (2016): Perpetual Loyal (Anthony Bell, Tom Slingsby)

Succession
- Previous: Comanche (Ken Read) in 2015
- Next: Comanche (Jim Cooney) in 2017

The 2016 Sydney to Hobart Yacht Race, sponsored by Rolex and hosted by the Cruising Yacht Club of Australia in Sydney, New South Wales, was the 72nd annual running of the Sydney to Hobart Yacht Race. It began on Sydney Harbour at 1pm on Boxing Day (26 December 2016), before heading south for 628 nautical miles (1,163 km) through the Tasman Sea, Bass Strait, Storm Bay and up the River Derwent, to cross the finish line in Hobart, Tasmania. 88 vessels started.

Line honours were claimed by Perpetual Loyal, which broke Wild Oats XI 2012 race record, to finish in a time of 1 day, 13 hours, 31 minutes and 20 seconds. Giacomo (Jim Delegat) earned the Tattersall's Cup.

== Results ==
=== Line Honours ===
Pos	Sail Number	Yacht	State/Country	Yacht Type	LOA (Metres)	Skipper	Elapsed time d:hh:mm:ss
1	SYD1000	Perpetual Loyal	New South Wales	Juan Yacht Design Juan-K 100	30.48	Anthony Bell; Tom Slingsby	1:13:31:20
2	NZL70000	Giacomo	New Zealand	Juan-K Volvo Open 70	21.50	Jim Delegat	1:15:27:05
3	HKG2276	Scallywag	Hong Kong	Dovell 100	30.48	David Witt	1:15:29:15
4	52570	Black Jack	Queensland	Juan-K Volvo Open 70	21.50	Mark Bradford	1:20:09:58
5	HKG1997	Beau Geste	Hong Kong	Botin 80	24.40	Aaron Rowe	1:21:03:34
6	ITA70	Maserati	New South Wales	Juan-K Volvo Open 70	21.50	Jim Cooney	1:21:04:56
7	AUS11111	CQS	New South Wales	Simonis Voogd-Bakewell White Supermaxi	30.48	Ludde Ingvall	2:03:13:12
8	52566	Alive	Tasmania	Reichel Pugh 66	22.00	Philip Turner; Duncan Hine	2:03:33:42
9	AUS13	Chinese Whisper	New South Wales	Judel Vrolijk JV62	18.90	Rupert Henry	2:04:01:03
10	AUS001	Ichi Ban	New South Wales	Judel Vrolijk TP 52	15.85	Matthew Allen	2:04:18:56
11	GER7111	Varuna VI	Germany	Ker 56	17.07	Jens Kellinghusen	2:04:42:44
12	7771	Balance	New South Wales	Farr TP 52	15.85	Paul Clitheroe; Mike Green	2:05:00:17
13	CHN10007	UBOX	China	Farr Cookson 50	15.24	Charles Caudrelier; Lei Wang	2:05:06:33
14	AUS5299	Victoire	Western Australia	Farr Cookson 50	15.24	Brian McMaster	2:09:31:58
15	6952	Celestial	New South Wales	Judel Vrolijk TP 52	15.85	Sam Haynes	2:11:44:13
16	AUS8899	Hollywood Boulevard	New South Wales	Farr 55	16.76	Ray Roberts	2:11:50:32
17	SM24	Terra Firma	(Victoria (state)) Victoria	Farr Cookson 50	15.24	Nicholas Bartels	2:15:13:30
18	AUS52	M3	Western Australia	Farr TP 52	15.85	Peter Hickson; Brent Fowler	2:15:14:52
19	AUS70	Ragamuffin	New South Wales	Farr TP 52	15.85	Brenton Fischer	2:17:53:22
20	6377	Triton	New South Wales	Lyons-Cawse LC60	18.30	Michael Cranitch; David Gotze	2:18:42:36
21	JPN4321	KLC Bengal 7	Japan	Humphreys 54	16.46	Yoshihiko Murase	2:19:07:03
22	421	The Goat	New South Wales	Mills Rogers 46	14.02	Sebastian Bohm; Bruce Foye	2:19:55:49
23	S777	Primitive Cool	(Victoria (state)) Victoria	Reichel Pugh RP51	15.61	John Newbold	2:20:19:29
24	KOR-5555	Sonic	South Korea	Donovan TP 52	15.85	Kwangmin Rho	2:20:37:38
25	6953	PYR Wot Eva	New South Wales	Nelson Marek TP 52	15.85	Christian Reynolds	2:21:04:43
26	R33	Chutzpah	(Victoria (state)) Victoria	Reichel Pugh Caprice 40	12.35	Bruce Taylor	2:21:18:48
27	65007	Elena Nova	New South Wales	Judel Vrolijk JV42	12.80	Craig Neil	2:21:51:00
28	SM42	Simply Fun	(Victoria (state)) Victoria	Judel Vrolijk HH42	12.80	Philip Coombs	2:21:51:28
29	6686	St Jude	New South Wales	Murray Burns Dovell Sydney 47	14.20	Noel Cornish	2:23:49:44
30	262	Helsal 3	New South Wales	Adams 20	20.00	Paul Mara; Rob Fisher	2:23:53:55
31	RUS1	Simplesail Mahligai	Russia	Murray Burns Dovell Sydney 46	14.30	Murray Owen; Jenny Kings	3:00:45:30
32	SA1106	Aikin-Hames Sharley	South Australia	Ker 11.3	11.30	Caillin Howard; David Oliver	3:00:47:50
33	99	Springday Pazazz	New South Wales	Farr Cookson 12	11.90	Rob Drury	3:00:53:51
34	SWE15	Matador	Sweden	Elliott 44	13.65	Jonas Grandr; Richard Goransson	3:01:02:06
35	ESP6100	Duende	New South Wales	Judel Vrolijk TP 52	15.39	Damien Parkes	3:01:02:08
36	G4646R	Extasea	(Victoria (state)) Victoria	Mills DK46	14.00	Paul Buchholz; Bryan Kennett	3:01:41:56
37	8778	After Midnight	New South Wales	Farr 40 Mod	12.40	Mark & Greg Tobin	3:01:45:35
38	33345	Black Sheep	New South Wales	Briand Beneteau 45	13.70	Derek & Martin Sheppard	3:01:56:18
39	6723	Allegro	New South Wales	Warwick 67	20.30	Adrian Lewis	3:02:14:04
40	6893	Imalizard	New South Wales	Welbourn 12	11.80	Bruce Watson	3:02:30:56
41	YC1545	Shining Sea	South Australia	Briand Beneteau First 45	13.60	Andrew Corletto	3:02:40:48
42	B40	Bravo	Queensland	Farr Beneteau First 40	12.60	Robert Robertson	3:02:56:33
43	MH777	Patrice Six	New South Wales	Jeppesen X41	12.50	Andrew Prideaux; Shaun Lane	3:03:24:42
44	RQ432	Dekadence	Queensland	Mills DK46	14.10	Stephanie Kerin	3:04:12:53
45	2001	Quetzalcoatl	New South Wales	Jones 40	12.33	Anthony Bruce; James Lee Warner; Antony Sweetapple	3:04:21:55
46	A140	Ariel	New South Wales	Farr Beneteau First 40	12.60	Ron Forster; Philip Damp	3:04:27:56
47	35	Imagination	New South Wales	Farr Beneteau First 47.7	14.50	Robin & Hamish Hawthorn	3:04:43:16
48	248	Wax Lyrical	New South Wales	Jeppesen X50	15.20	Les Goodridge	3:04:50:50
49	AUS257	Charlotte	New South Wales	Briand CNB76	23.20	Ervin Vidor	3:04:58:08
50	SM4	Wicked	(Victoria (state)) Victoria	Farr Beneteau First 40	12.24	Mike Welsh	3:05:03:47
51	5612	Abracadabra	New South Wales	Tripp 47	14.33	James Murchison	3:05:29:44
52	9090	Quest	Queensland	Nelson Marek 43	13.10	Ian Coward	3:05:53:22
53	MH20	Philosophers	New South Wales	Farr Cookson 12	12.00	Gordon Ketelbey; Peter Sorensen	3:06:33:43
54	SM28	Challenge	(Victoria (state)) Victoria	Murray Burns Dovell Sydney 38	11.80	Chris Mrakas	3:06:39:45
55	YC400	Two True	South Australia	Farr Beneteau First 40	12.24	Andrew Saies	3:06:42:15
56	K1	Cromarty Magellan	Tasmania	Knoop 39	12.00	Richard Grant	3:06:53:48
57	USA93310	Triple Lindy	United States	Frers Swan MkII	13.40	Joseph Mele	3:07:07:23
58	H6110	Samskara	(United Kingdom) Great Britain	Farr Beneteau First 47.7	14.50	Richard Stain	3:07:08:50
59	4527	China Easyway	New South Wales	King Jarkan 12.5	12.70	Travis Read; Tim Wilson	3:07:28:20
60	6755	Ausreo	New South Wales	Farr Beneteau 47.7	14.00	Ian Creak	3:07:36:24
61	294	Love & War	New South Wales	Sparkman & Stephens S&S 47	14.21	Simon Kurts	3:07:42:48
62	SA346	Enchantress	South Australia	Muirhead 11	11.00	John Willoughby	3:07:48:56
63	A164	Sticky	New South Wales	J&J Yachts Salona 38	11.50	Richard Harris	3:07:54:56
64	1236	Local Hero	New South Wales	Murray Burns Dovell BH36	11.00	Chris Matthews	3:08:00:10
65	6774	Jackpot	New South Wales	Johnstone J122	12.20	Adrian Van Bellen	3:08:59:36
66	6834	Breakthrough	New South Wales	Farr Beneteau First 40	12.20	Mathew Vadas	3:11:40:52
67	G54	Moody Buoys	(Victoria (state)) Victoria	Dixon Moody 54DS	17.20	Trevor Richardson	3:11:49:46
68	SM69	Dark and Stormy	(Victoria (state)) Victoria	Murray Custom 37	11.40	Terry Kourtis; Stuart Mellington	3:12:53:35
69	7551	Flying Fish Arctos	New South Wales	Radford McIntyre 55	15.36	Ivan Signorelli	3:05:25:20 ^{1}
70	8824	Chancellor	New South Wales	Farr Beneteau 47.7	14.80	Edward Tooher	3:13:02:34
71	5930	Reve	New South Wales	Farr Beneteau 45F5	14.00	Kevin Whelan	3:13:14:48
72	11407	Pelagic Magic	New South Wales	Farr Beneteau 40.7	11.90	Simon Dunlop	3:14:45:13
73	3430	Komatsu Azzurro	New South Wales	Sparkman & Stephens S&S 34	10.10	Shane Kearns	3:15:02:19
74	2382	Ark323	China	Farr TP 52	15.85	Dong Qing	3:15:17:39
75	4924	She	Queensland	Mull Olsen 40 Modified	12.20	Philip Bell	3:16:21:37
76	A19	Maluka	New South Wales	Gale Ranger 30	9.01	Sean Langman	3:19:38:07
77	GBR9354T	Clipper Ventures 5	(United Kingdom) Great Britain	Dubois Clipper 68	20.77	Drew Hulton-Smith	4:01:43:29
78	A5	On Tap	Queensland	Duncanson 34	10.26	Stephen Hughes; Marc Stuart	4:01:50:22
79	6891	Takani	New South Wales	Judel Vrolijk Hanse 495	15.40	James Whittle	3:07:27:34 ^{2}
80	554	Landfall	New South Wales	Sparkman & Stephens S&S 54	13.40	Michael Strong	4:03:49:23
81	6841	Papillon	New South Wales	Joubert-Nivelt Archambault 40RC	12.00	Phil Molony	3:07:30:30 ^{3}
82	45	Fidelis	New South Wales	Knud Reimers 61	18.60	Nigel Stoke	3:09:27:22 ^{4}
83	B330	Hartbreaker	(Victoria (state)) Victoria	Reichel Pugh 46	14.20	Antony Walton; Alan Breidahl	3:07:23:51 ^{5}
DNF	RF9095	Dare Devil	New South Wales	Farr Cookson 47	14.30	Sibby Ilzhofer	Retired-Broken Rudder
DNF	N10	Freyja	New South Wales	Atkins Ingrid 37	11.40	Richard Lees	Retired-Headsail Damage
DNF	52152	Koa	New South Wales	Farr TP 52	15.85	Peter Wrigley; Andrew Kearnan	Retired-Broken Starter Motor
DNF	360	Patrice	New South Wales	Ker 46	13.90	Tony Kirby	Retired-Broken Rudder
DNF	10001	Wild Oats XI	New South Wales	Reichel Pugh 100	30.48	Mark Richards	Retired-Hydraulic Ram Issues

Notes

^1 – Flying Fish Arctos were penalised 20% of their placing by the International Jury due to failing to lodge a declaration within six hours of their finish time as required by Sailing Instruction 26 (Declarations).
^2 – Takani were penalised 20% of their placing by the International Jury due to failing to lodge a declaration within six hours of their finish time as required by Sailing Instruction 26 (Declarations).
^3 – Papillon were penalised 20% of their placing by the International Jury due to failing to lodge a declaration within six hours of their finish time as required by Sailing Instruction 26 (Declarations).
^4 – Fidelis were penalised 20% of their placing by the International Jury due to failing to lodge a declaration within six hours of their finish time as required by Sailing Instruction 26 (Declarations).
^5 – Hartbreaker were penalised 30% of their placing by the International Jury due to breaching RRS Rule 41 (Outside Assistance) for receiving outside assistance after encountering engine problems during the race.

=== Overall Handicap ===
Pos	Division Number	Sail Number	Yacht	State/Country	Yacht Type	LOA (Metres)	Skipper	Elapsed time d:hh:mm:ss
1	0	NZL70000	Giacomo	New Zealand	Juan-K Volvo Open 70	21.50	Jim Delegat	2:16:13:37
2	0	SYD1000	Perpetual Loyal	New South Wales	Juan Yacht Design Juan-K 100	30.48	Anthony Bell; Tom Slingsby	2:23:44:33
3	0	CHN10007	UBOX	China	Farr Cookson 50	15.24	Charles Caudrelier; Lei Wang	3:00:20:05
4	1	7771	Balance	New South Wales	Farr TP 52	15.85	Paul Clitheroe; Mike Green	3:00:46:32
5	1	AUS001	Ichi Ban	New South Wales	Judel Vrolijk TP 52	15.85	Matthew Allen	3:01:11:22
6	0	HKG2276	Scallywag	Hong Kong	Dovell 100	30.48	David Witt	3:04:22:08
7	0	ITA70	Maserati	New South Wales	Juan-K Volvo Open 70	21.50	Jim Cooney	3:05:02:44
8	0	HKG1997	Beau Geste	Hong Kong	Botin 80	24.40	Aaron Rowe	3:05:24:44
9	0	AUS13	Chinese Whisper	New South Wales	Judel Vrolijk JV62	18.90	Rupert Henry	3:05:30:22
10	0	AUS5299	Victoire	Western Australia	Farr Cookson 50	15.24	Brian McMaster	3:05:43:36
11	0	52570	Black Jack	Queensland	Juan-K Volvo Open 70	21.50	Mark Bradford	3:05:43:56
12	4	A19	Maluka	New South Wales	Gale Ranger 30	9.01	Sean Langman	3:07:59:51
13	4	3430	Komatsu Azzurro	New South Wales	Sparkman & Stephens S&S 34	10.10	Shane Kearns	3:08:41:05
14	3	B40	Bravo	Queensland	Farr Beneteau First 40	12.60	Robert Robertson	3:08:42:47
15	4	294	Love & War	New South Wales	Sparkman & Stephens S&S 47	14.21	Simon Kurts	3:09:13:40
16	1	6952	Celestial	New South Wales	Judel Vrolijk TP 52	15.85	Sam Haynes	3:09:28:52
17	0	52566	Alive	Tasmania	Reichel Pugh 66	22.00	Philip Turner; Duncan Hine	3:09:31:08
18	0	GER7111	Varuna VI	Germany	Ker 56	17.07	Jens Kellinghusen	3:09:45:24
19	3	33345	Black Sheep	New South Wales	Briand Beneteau 45	13.70	Derek & Martin Sheppard	3:10:04:18
20	4	SA346	Enchantress	South Australia	Muirhead 11	11.00	John Willoughby	3:10:07:49
21	3	A140	Ariel	New South Wales	Farr Beneteau First 40	12.60	Ron Forster; Philip Damp	3:10:25:48
22	4	4527	China Easyway	New South Wales	King Jarkan 12.5	12.70	Travis Read; Tim Wilson	3:10:29:32
23	2	99	Springday Pazazz	New South Wales	Farr Cookson 12	11.90	Rob Drury	3:10:35:34
24	2	R33	Chutzpah	(Victoria (state)) Victoria	Reichel Pugh Caprice 40	12.35	Bruce Taylor	3:10:37:17
25	3	SM4	Wicked	(Victoria (state)) Victoria	Farr Beneteau First 40	12.24	Mike Welsh	3:11:13:41
26	2	SA1106	Aikin-Hames Sharley	South Australia	Ker 11.3	11.30	Caillin Howard; David Oliver	3:11:25:32
27	4	USA93310	Triple Lindy	United States	Frers Swan MkII	13.40	Joseph Mele	3:11:28:29
28	4	A164	Sticky	New South Wales	J&J Yachts Salona 38	11.50	Richard Harris	3:11:35:50
29	4	1236	Local Hero	New South Wales	Murray Burns Dovell BH36	11.00	Chris Matthews	3:11:36:10
30	3	MH777	Patrice Six	New South Wales	Jeppesen X41	12.50	Andrew Prideaux; Shaun Lane	3:11:42:25
31	1	SM24	Terra Firma	(Victoria (state)) Victoria	Farr Cookson 50	15.24	Nicholas Bartels	3:11:42:36
32	3	YC1545	Shining Sea	South Australia	Briand Beneteau First 45	13.60	Andrew Corletto	3:12:00:54
33	3	K1	Cromarty Magellan	Tasmania	Knoop 39	12.00	Richard Grant	3:12:06:14
34	2	6686	St Jude	New South Wales	Murray Burns Dovell Sydney 47	14.20	Noel Cornish	3:12:15:19
35	2	8778	After Midnight	New South Wales	Farr 40 Mod	12.40	Mark & Greg Tobin	3:12:27:18
36	1	AUS8899	Hollywood Boulevard	New South Wales	Farr 55	16.76	Ray Roberts	3:12:29:50
37	3	YC400	Two True	South Australia	Farr Beneteau First 40	12.24	Andrew Saies	3:12:55:18
38	3	35	Imagination	New South Wales	Farr Beneteau First 47.7	14.50	Robin & Hamish Hawthorn	3:12:55:49
39	2	SM42	Simply Fun	(Victoria (state)) Victoria	Judel Vrolijk HH42	12.80	Philip Coombs	3:13:01:01
40	3	6755	Ausreo	New South Wales	Farr Beneteau 47.7	14.00	Ian Creak	3:13:05:58
41	2	65007	Elena Nova	New South Wales	Judel Vrolijk JV42	12.80	Craig Neil	3:13:25:36
42	1	AUS52	M3	Western Australia	Farr TP 52	15.85	Peter Hickson; Brent Fowler	3:13:26:52
43	1	421	The Goat	New South Wales	Mills Rogers 46	14.02	Sebastian Bohm; Bruce Foye	3:13:51:50
44	3	SM28	Challenge	(Victoria (state)) Victoria	Murray Burns Dovell Sydney 38	11.80	Chris Mrakas	3:14:50:36
45	3	6774	Jackpot	New South Wales	Johnstone J122	12.20	Adrian Van Bellen	3:14:54:21
46	4	A5	On Tap	Queensland	Duncanson 34	10.26	Stephen Hughes; Marc Stuart	3:15:33:59
47	2	G4646R	Extasea	(Victoria (state)) Victoria	Mills DK46	14.00	Paul Buchholz; Bryan Kennett	3:15:37:41
48	3	H6110	Samskara	(United Kingdom) Great Britain	Farr Beneteau First 47.7	14.50	Richard Stain	3:15:41:42
49	1	AUS70	Ragamuffin	New South Wales	Farr TP 52	15.85	Brenton Fischer	3:16:37:17
50	2	MH20	Philosophers	New South Wales	Farr Cookson 12	12.00	Gordon Ketelbey; Peter Sorensen	3:17:33:38
51	2	9090	Quest	Queensland	Nelson Marek 43	13.10	Ian Coward	3:17:39:03
52	3	6834	Breakthrough	New South Wales	Farr Beneteau First 40	12.20	Mathew Vadas	3:17:42:22
53	2	SWE15	Matador	Sweden	Elliott 44	13.65	Jonas Grandr; Richard Goransson	3:17:46:50
54	2	RQ432	Dekadence	Queensland	Mills DK46	14.10	Stephanie Kerin	3:18:05:09
55	4	11407	Pelagic Magic	New South Wales	Farr Beneteau 40.7	11.90	Simon Dunlop	3:19:31:30
56	1	KOR-5555	Sonic	South Korea	Donovan TP 52	15.85	Kwangmin Rho	3:20:14:06
57	1	S777	Primitive Cool	(Victoria (state)) Victoria	Reichel Pugh RP51	15.61	John Newbold	3:20:18:24
58	1	JPN4321	KLC Bengal 7	Japan	Humphreys 54	16.46	Yoshihiko Murase	3:20:29:15
59	3	6841	Papillon	New South Wales	Joubert-Nivelt Archambault 40RC	12.00	Phil Molony	3:14:01:41 ^{1}
60	3	SM69	Dark and Stormy	(Victoria (state)) Victoria	Murray Custom 37	11.40	Terry Kourtis; Stuart Mellington	3:21:02:34
61	1	6377	Triton	New South Wales	Lyons-Cawse LC60	18.30	Michael Cranitch; David Gotze	3:22:27:41
62	3	8824	Chancellor	New South Wales	Farr Beneteau 47.7	14.80	Edward Tooher	3:22:34:03
63	0	AUS11111	CQS	New South Wales	Simonis Voogd-Bakewell White Supermaxi	30.48	Ludde Ingvall	3:23:10:00
64	2	GBR9354T	Clipper Ventures 5	(United Kingdom) Great Britain	Dubois Clipper 68	20.77	Drew Hulton-Smith	4:21:45:30
65	1	2382	Ark323	China	Farr TP 52	15.85	Dong Qing	4:23:04:09
66	3	45	Fidelis	New South Wales	Knud Reimers 61	18.60	Nigel Stoke	3:18:49:25 ^{2}
67	1	B330	Hartbreaker	(Victoria (state)) Victoria	Reichel Pugh 46	14.20	Antony Walton; Alan Breidahl	4:05:47:15 ^{3}
DNF	2	RF9095	Dare Devil	New South Wales	Farr Cookson 47	14.30	Sibby Ilzhofer	Retired-Broken Rudder
DNF	1	52152	Koa	New South Wales	Farr TP 52	15.85	Peter Wrigley; Andrew Kearnan	Retired-Broken Starter Motor
DNF	1	360	Patrice	New South Wales	Ker 46	13.90	Tony Kirby	Retired-Broken Rudder
DNF	0	10001	Wild Oats XI	New South Wales	Reichel Pugh 100	30.48	Mark Richards	Retired-Hydraulic Ram Issues

Notes

^1 – Papillon were penalised 20% of their placing by the International Jury due to failing to lodge a declaration within six hours of their finish time as required by Sailing Instruction 26 (Declarations).
^2 – Fidelis were penalised 20% of their placing by the International Jury due to failing to lodge a declaration within six hours of their finish time as required by Sailing Instruction 26 (Declarations).
^3 – Hartbreaker were penalised 30% of their placing by the International Jury due to breaching RRS Rule 41 (Outside Assistance) for receiving outside assistance after encountering engine problems during the race.
