= 2025 Sydney to Hobart Yacht Race =

The 2025 Sydney to Hobart Yacht Race was the 80th running of the race. The maxi yacht Comanche won line honours. The overall winner under handicap rules was the yacht "Min River". Initially the yacht "BNC" was awarded the handicap win, but it was as set aside after a protest by the crew of "Min River.
