= LawConnect =

Racing yacht

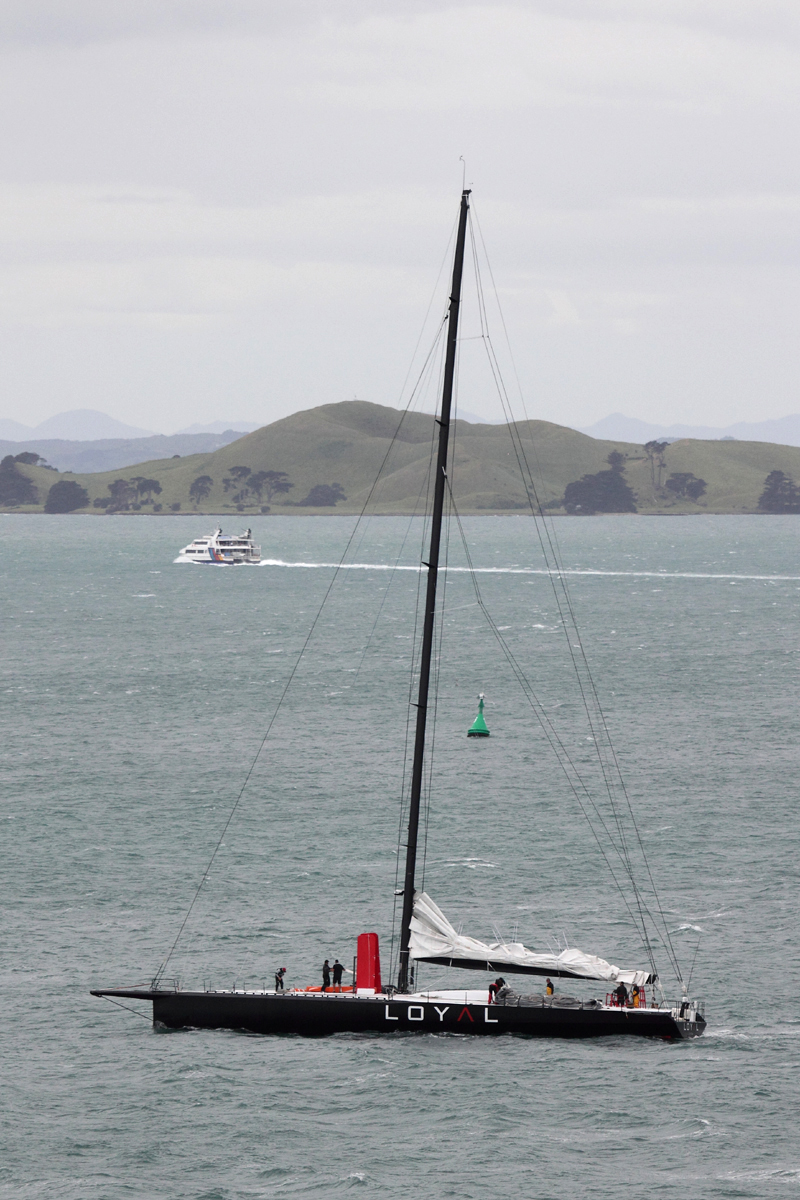
- Perpetual Loyal in 2013

Development
- Designer: Juan Kouyoumdjian
- Builder: TP Cookson Boats

Boat
- Crew: 12
- Displacement: 30 Tonne
- Draft: 6.22 m (20.4 ft)

Hull
- LOA: 30.48 m (100.0 ft)
- Beam: 7.35 m (24.1 ft)

Sails
- Upwind sail area: 685 m^{2} (7,370 sq ft)
- Downwind sail area: 1,122 m^{2} (12,080 sq ft)

Racing
- Class association: Maxi yacht

Infotrack, formerly Perpetual Loyal, is a maxi yacht. It has won line honours three times in the Sydney to Hobart Yacht Race.

== Career ==
As Perpetual Loyal, it won line honours in the 2016 Sydney to Hobart Yacht Race, in a record time of 1 day, 13 hours, 31 minutes. It broke the previous race record by five hours, averaging a speed of 17 knots.

== Sponsorship ==
Perpetual’s sponsorship of the yacht expired before the 2016 Sydney to Hobart Yacht Race. Bell was unable to secure new sponsorship or branding before the race and raced with the old branding in place.

== Name and ownership history ==
Name	Year	Owner	Notes
Speedboat 100	2008	Alex Jackson	Line honours in Newport Bermuda Race
Virgin Money	2008	Richard Branson	
Rambler 100	2011	George David	Keel failed in 2011 Fastnet Race
Perpetual Loyal	2013	Anthony Bell	Line honours and course record in Sydney to Hobart Race
InfoTrack	2017	Christian Beck	
LawConnect	2023	Christian Beck	Line honours in Sydney to Hobart Race
LawConnect	2024	Christian Beck	Line honours in Sydney to Hobart Race
LawConnect	2025	Christian Beck	Second in Sydney to Hobart Race Ian Thorpe joins the crew
