= Comanche (yacht) =

100ft Offshore Racing Yacht (2014)

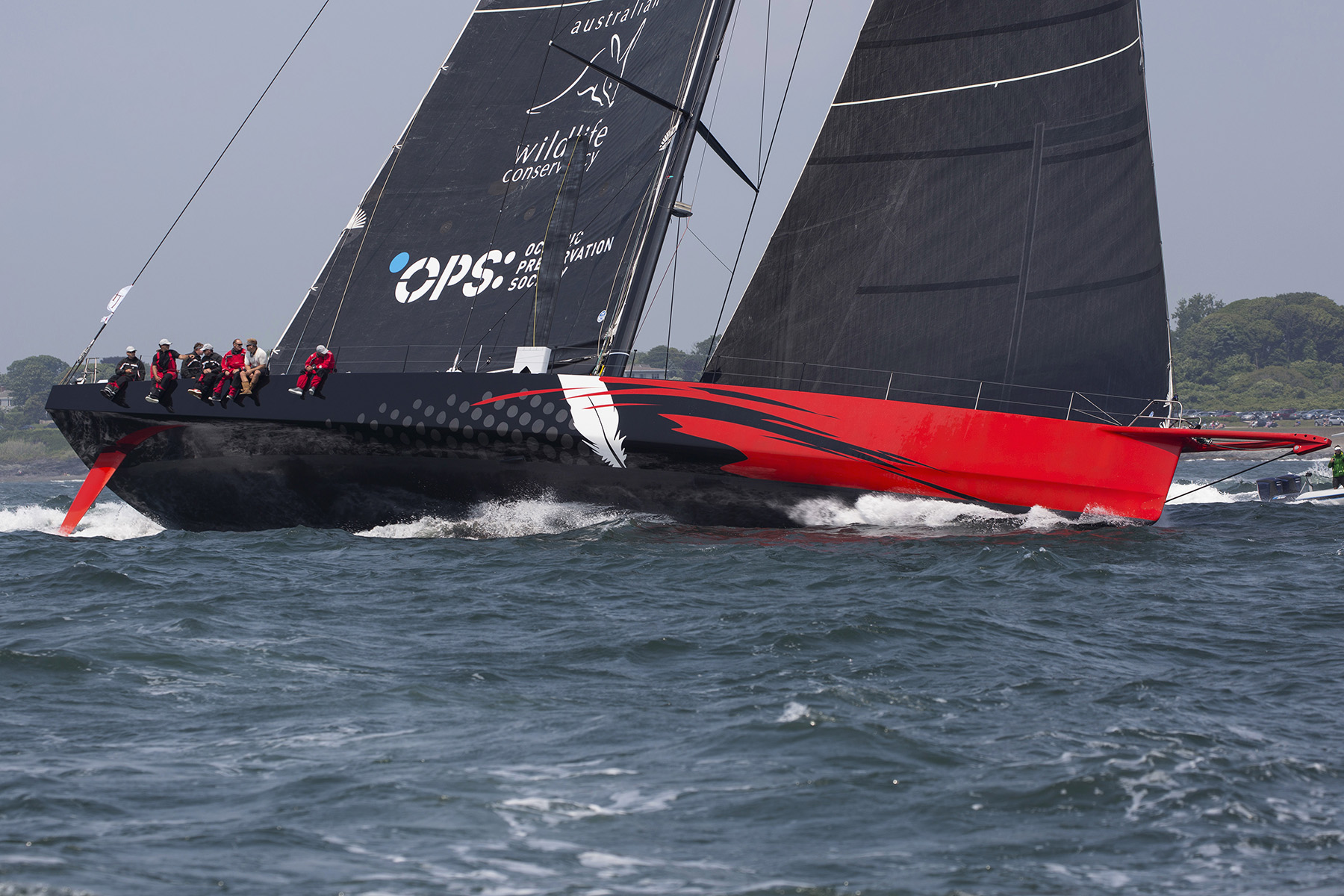
- Comanche at the start of the 2015 transatlantic race
- Class: Supermaxi
- Designer(s): VPLP and Guillaume Verdier
- Builder: Hodgdon Yachts

Specifications
- Type: Monohull
- Displacement: 31,000 kg
- Length: 30.5 m (100.07 ft)
- Beam: 7.85 m (25.75 ft)
- Draft: 6.81 m (22.34 ft)
- Mast height: 46.0 m (150.92 ft)

Comanche is a 100-ft (30.5 m) maxi yacht. She was designed in France by VPLP and Guillaume Verdier and built in the United States by Hodgdon Yachts for Dr. James H. Clark.

Comanche held the 24-hour sailing record for monohulls from July 2015 until May 2023, covering 618 nmi, for an average of 25.75 knots or 47.69 kmh/h. The boat won line honours in the 2015 Fastnet race and the 2015 Sydney to Hobart Yacht Race, under the leadership of skipper Ken Read. In 2017, Comanche set a new Transpac record, covering 484.1 nmi in 24 hours, for an average speed of 20.2 knots (37.4 km/h). In 2019, under navigator Stan Honey, the yacht won the 2225-mile 50th Transpacific Yacht Race, with a time of 5 days 11 hours 14 minutes 05 seconds. Comanche won the 2017 Sydney to Hobart yacht race, with a time of 1 day 9 hours 15 minutes 24 seconds, a record that still stands today.

At 5 days 14 hours 21 minutes 25 seconds, Comanche holds the Monohull Transatlantic sailing record for the fastest crossing of the Atlantic Ocean, which they achieved on July 28, 2016.

In December 2017, Comanche was sold to Australian Jim Cooney, and was renamed to LDV Comanche, as part of a one-time sponsorship from SAIC Maxus Automotive Co's LDV brand. The yacht later returned to its original, unsponsored title of Comanche. Under this name it won the Sydney-Hobart race again in 2019 in 1 day 18 hours and 30 minutes.

Soon after the completion of the 2019 Sydney-Hobart race, Comanche was reportedly sold to a Russian interest group. In 2022, following the Russian invasion of Ukraine, the operators made a statement denying Russian ownership.

It won the 2022 RORC Transatlantic Race.

It won line honours in the 2025 Sydney to Hobart Yacht Race.
