= Mark Richards (sailor) =

Australian sailor and boatbuilder

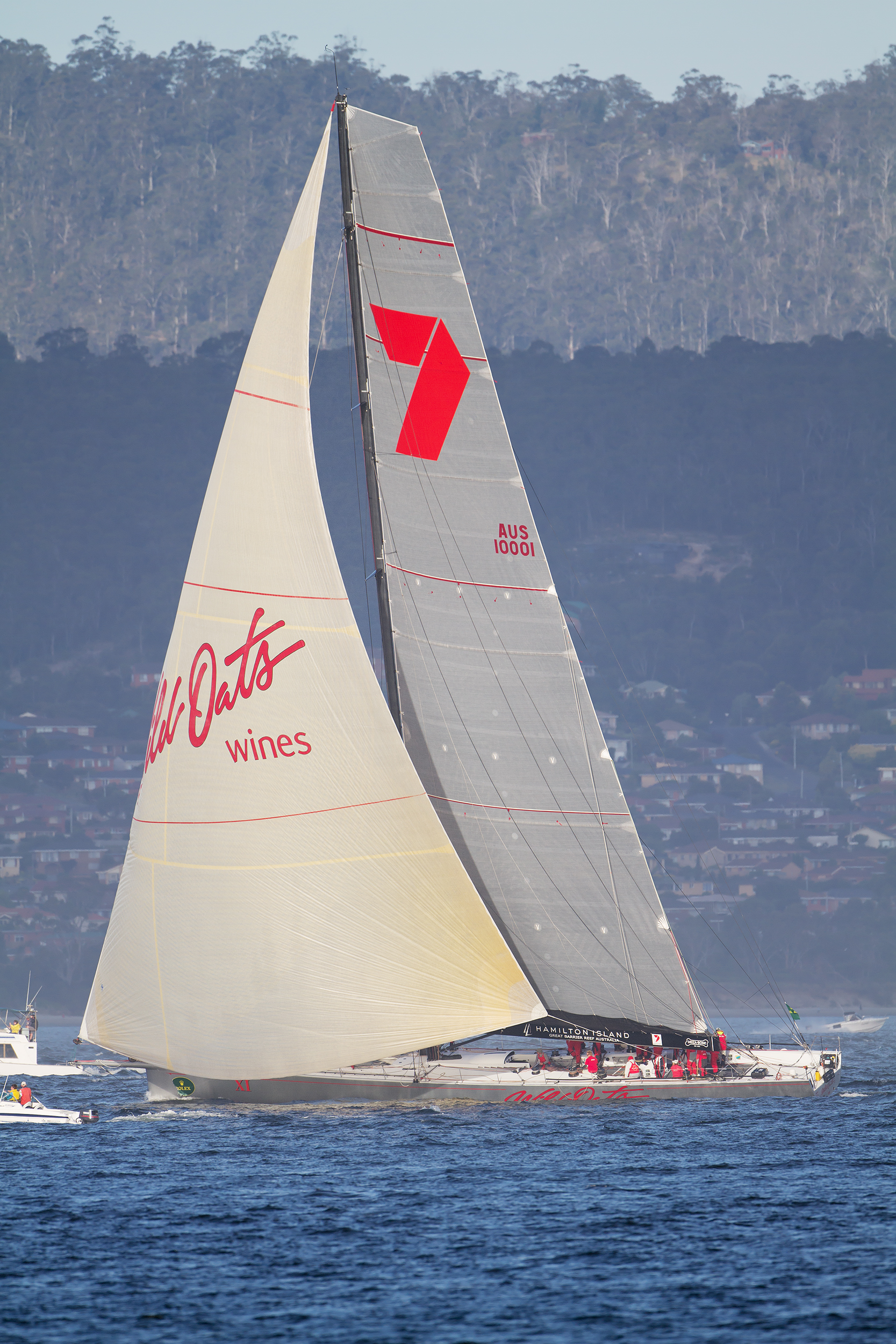
Wild Oats XI in the 2011 Sydney to Hobart race, skippered by Richards

Mark Richards is an Australian sailor and boatbuilder, known for his achievements as the long-time skipper of Wild Oats XI, 9 times line honours winner of the annual Rolex Sydney Hobart Yacht race.

In 1995, Richards founded Palm Beach Motor Yachts in Australia, which was acquired by Grand Banks Yachts in 2014. Richards is currently CEO of Grand Banks as a result of the acquisition.

As a professional sailor, Richards has sailed in 2 Americas Cup challenges, has achieved World Match Racing victories, has won the Sydney to Gold Coast yacht race, the 2003 Admirals Cup, and has taken out line honours and handicap honours in the prestigious Rolex Sydney to Hobart races.

== Notable victories ==
Year	Title	Vessel	Position
2003	Admiral's Cup	Wild Oats IX	Principal Helmsman
2005	Rolex Sydney Hobart Yacht Race	Wild Oats XI	Skipper
2006	Rolex Sydney Hobart Yacht Race	Wild Oats XI	Skipper
2007	Rolex Sydney Hobart Yacht Race	Wild Oats XI	Skipper
2008	Rolex Sydney Hobart Yacht Race	Wild Oats XI	Skipper
2010	Rolex Sydney Hobart Yacht Race	Wild Oats XI	Skipper
2012	Rolex Sydney Hobart Yacht Race	Wild Oats XI	Skipper
2013	Rolex Sydney Hobart Yacht Race	Wild Oats XI	Skipper
2014	Rolex Sydney Hobart Yacht Race	Wild Oats XI	Skipper
2018	Rolex Sydney Hobart Yacht Race	Wild Oats XI	Skipper
