= List of yacht clubs in Australia =

This is a list of yacht clubs in Australia.

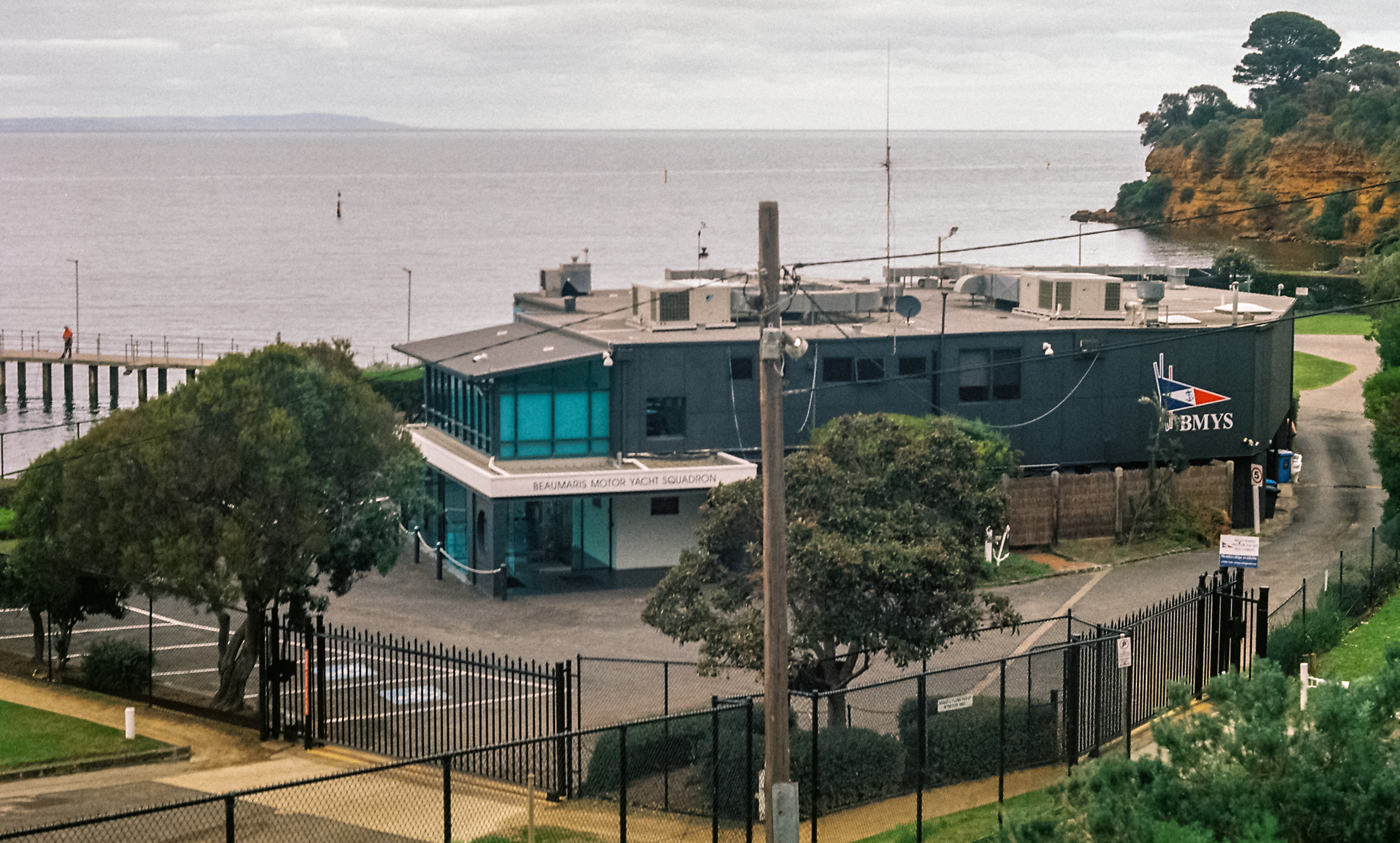
Yacht club at Beaumaris Victoria

Club	State	Location	Founded Year	Coordinates	Ref.
Canberra Yacht Club		Canberra	1959	35°17′58″S 149°7′1″E	
Australian 18 Footers League	New South Wales	Double Bay, Sydney			
Balmain Sailing Club	New South Wales	Balmain, Sydney	1885	33°51′06″S 151°10′40″E	
Belmont 16ft Sailing Club	New South Wales	Belmont, Lake Macquarie	1922		
Cruising Yacht Club of Australia	New South Wales	Rushcutters Bay, Sydney	1944	33°52′27″S 151°14′2″E	
Balmoral Sailing Club	New South Wales	Mosman, Sydney	1945		
Batemans Bay Sailing Club	New South Wales	Batemans Bay			
Coffs Harbour Yacht Club	New South Wales	Coffs Harbour	1960		
Drummoyne Sailing Club	New South Wales	Drummoyne, Sydney	1913		
Greenwich Flying Squadron	New South Wales	Greenwich, Sydney			
Lane Cove 12ft Sailing Skiff Club	New South Wales	Longueville, Sydney			
Lake Jindabyne Sailing Club	New South Wales	Jindabyne			
Lake Macquarie Yacht Club	New South Wales	Belmont			
Manly Yacht Club	New South Wales	Manly, Sydney	1950	33°48′11″S 151°17′7″E	
Middle Harbour Yacht Club	New South Wales	Mosman, Sydney	1939		
Newcastle Cruising Yacht Club	New South Wales	Wickham	1994		
Royal Australian Naval Sailing Association	New South Wales	Rushcutters Bay, Sydney			
Royal Motor Yacht Club of New South Wales	New South Wales	Point Piper, Sydney		33°52′1″S 151°15′15″E	
Royal Prince Alfred Yacht Club	New South Wales	Newport, Sydney	1867	33°39′23″S 151°18′20″E	
Royal Prince Edward Yacht Club	New South Wales	Point Piper, Sydney	1922	33°51′55″S 151°15′12″E	
Royal Sydney Yacht Squadron	New South Wales	Kirribilli, Sydney	1862	33°50′53″S 151°13′14″E	
Sydney Amateur Sailing Club	New South Wales	Mosman Bay, Sydney		33°50′32″S 151°13′49″E	
Sydney Flying Squadron	New South Wales	Careening Cove, Sydney		33°50′42″S 151°12′54″E	
Vaucluse Yacht Club	New South Wales	Watsons Bay, Sydney			
Wollongong Yacht Club	New South Wales	Wollongong	1966		
Woollahra Sailing Club	New South Wales	Rose Bay, Sydney	1953		
Alice Springs Yacht Club	Northern Territory	Alice Springs			
Darwin Sailing Club	Northern Territory	Darwin			
Gove Yacht Club	Northern Territory	Gove Peninsula			
Brisbane Eighteen Footers Sailing Club	Queensland	Morningside			
Cleveland Yacht Club	Queensland	Cleveland			
Eumundi Yacht Club	Queensland	Eumundi			
Gladstone Yacht Club	Queensland	Gladstone	1938		
Hamilton Island Yacht Club	Queensland	Hamilton Island	2009		
Humpybong Yacht Club	Queensland	Woody Point			
Moreton Bay Boat Club	Queensland	Moreton Bay			
Multihull Yacht Club	Queensland	Manly			
Newport Cruising Yacht Club	Queensland	Newport			
North Queensland Cruising Yacht Club	Queensland	Bowen			
Oxley Sailing Club	Queensland	Oxley			
Paradise Point Sailing Club	Queensland	Paradise Point			
Port Douglas Yacht Club	Queensland	Port Douglas			
Queensland Cruising Yacht Club	Queensland	Shorncliffe			
Royal Queensland Yacht Squadron	Queensland	Manly	1885		
Sandgate Yacht Club	Queensland	Sandgate			
South Brisbane Sailing Club	Queensland	South Brisbane			
Southport Yacht Club	Queensland	Southport			
Townsville Yacht Club	Queensland	Townsville			
Whitsunday Sailing Club	Queensland	Whitsunday Islands			
Wynnum-Manly Yacht Club	Queensland	Manly			
Royal South Australian Yacht Squadron	South Australia	Outer Harbor			
Cruising Yacht Club of South Australia	South Australia	North Haven and Port Vincent			
Glenelg Yacht Club	South Australia	Glenelg North			Official website
Bellerive Yacht Club	Tasmania	Bellerive		42°52′27″S 147°21′57″E	
Burnie Yacht Club	Tasmania	Burnie		41°3′46″S 145°54′47″E	
Derwent Sailing Squadron	Tasmania	Sandy Bay		42°53′56.53″S 147°19′54.8″E	
Huon Yacht Club	Tasmania	Port Huon			
Kingston Beach Sailing Club	Tasmania	Kingston Beach			
Leven Yacht Club	Tasmania	Ulverstone			
Lindisfarne Sailing Club	Tasmania	Lindisfarne			
Mersey Yacht Club	Tasmania	Devonport			
Montrose Bay Yacht Club	Tasmania	Rosetta			
Port Esperance Sailing Club	Tasmania	Dover			
Royal Yacht Club of Tasmania	Tasmania	Sandy Bay	1880	42°53′52″S 147°19′56.93″E	
Sandy Bay Sailing Club	Tasmania	Sandy Bay			
Tamar Yacht Club	Tasmania	Launceston			
Wynyard Yacht Club	Tasmania	Wynyard			
Albert Park Yacht Club	Victoria	Albert Park, Victoria	1871	37°50′27″S 144°58′01″E	Albert Park Yacht Club on Facebook / Official website
Albert Sailing Club	Victoria	South Melbourne		37°50′23″S 144°58′01″E	Albert Sailing Club on Facebook / Official website
Albert Park Yachting & Angling Club	Victoria	Albert Park, Victoria	1909	37°50′58″S 144°57′03″E	Albert Park on Facebook / Official website
Albury Wodonga Yacht Club	Victoria	Bonegilla		36°07′34″S 147°01′13″E	Albury Wodonga Yacht Club on Facebook / Official website
Altona Yacht Club	Victoria	Seaholme		37°52′00″S 144°50′47″E	Altona Yacht Club on Facebook
Anglesea Motor Yacht Club	Victoria	Anglesea, Victoria		38°25′34″S 144°10′44″E	Anglesea Motor Yacht Club on Facebook
Apollo Bay Sailing Club	Victoria	Apollo Bay		38°45′35″S 143°40′36″E	Apollo Bay Sailing Club on Facebook / Official website
Ballaarat Yacht Club	Victoria	Ballarat	1877	37°33′19″S 143°50′19″E	Ballaarat Yacht Club on Facebook / Official website
Beaumaris Motor Yacht Squadron	Victoria	Beaumaris		37°59′25″S 145°02′38″E	
Beaumaris Yacht Club	Victoria	Beaumaris	1950	37°59′21″S 145°01′41″E	Beaumaris Yacht Club on Facebook / Official website
Bendigo Yacht Club	Victoria	Lake Eppalock	1962	36°51′46″S 144°30′17″E	Bendigo Yacht Club on Facebook / Official website
Black Rock Yacht Club	Victoria	Black Rock, Victoria	1904	37°58′10″S 145°00′37″E	Black Rock Yacht Club on Facebook / Official website
Blairgowrie Yacht Squadron	Victoria	Blairgowrie, Victoria		38°21′32″S 144°46′23″E	Blairgowrie Yacht Squadron on Facebook / Official website
Cairn Curran Sailing Club	Victoria	Castlemaine, Victoria		36°59′41″S 143°58′23″E	
Carrum Sailing and Motor Boat Club	Victoria	Carrum, Victoria	1946	38°04′32″S 145°07′16″E	
Chelsea Yacht Club	Victoria	Chelsea, Victoria	1938	38°02′58″S 145°06′43″E	Chelsea Yacht Club on Facebook / Official website
Colac Yacht Club	Victoria	Colac, Victoria		38°19′56″S 143°34′34″E	
Cowes Yacht Club	Victoria	Cowes, Victoria	1957	38°26′55″S 145°14′03″E	
Davey's Bay Yacht Club	Victoria	Mount Eliza	1909	38°09′51″S 145°05′34″E	Davey’s Bay Yacht Club on Facebook / Official website
Derrinallum Yacht and Power Boat Club Inc	Victoria	Derrinallum		37°55′51″S 143°10′37″E	Derrinallum Yacht and Power Boat Club on Facebook
Docklands Yacht Club	Victoria	Docklands		37°49′12″S 144°56′23″E	Dockkands Yacht Club on Facebook / Official website
Elwood Sailing Club	Victoria	Elwood, Victoria	1924	37°53′17″S 144°59′00″E	Elwood Sailing Club on Facebook / Official website
Flinders Yacht Club	Victoria	Flinders, Victoria		38°28′49″S 145°01′34″E	Flinders Yacht Club on Facebook
Frankston Yacht Club	Victoria	Frankston, Victoria		38°08′44″S 145°07′03″E	Frankston Yacht Club on Facebook / Official website
Geelong Trailable Yacht Club	Victoria	North Geelong, Victoria		38°07′13″S 144°21′35″E	
Gippsland Lakes Yacht Club	Victoria	Paynesville, Victoria	1937	37°55′14″S 147°43′25″E	Gippsland Lakes Yacht Club on Facebook / Official website
Hampton Sailing Club, Australia	Victoria	Sandringham, Victoria	1945	37°56′44″S 144°59′51″E	Hapton Sailing Club on Facebook / Official website
Hastings Yacht Club	Victoria	Hastings, Victoria	1960	38°18′33″S 145°11′51″E	Hastings Yacht Club on Facebook
Hobsons Bay Yacht Club	Victoria	Williamstown, Victoria		37°51′35″S 144°54′09″E	Hobsons Bay Yacht Club on Facebook
Horsham Yacht Club	Victoria	Bungalally		36°47′16″S 142°17′54″E	
Indented Head Yacht Club	Victoria	Indented Head		38°08′32″S 144°42′49″E	Indented Head Yacht Club on Facebook / Official website
Kew Yacht Club	Victoria	Kew, Victoria		37°49′09″S 145°02′16″E	
Lake Boga Yacht Club	Victoria	Lake Boga, Victoria	1936	35°27′17″S 143°37′46″E	Lake Boga Yacht Club on Facebook / Official website
Lake Wellington Yacht Club	Victoria	Clydebank, Victoria		38°03′37″S 147°14′59″E	Lake Wellington Yacht Club on Facebook / Official website
Lakeside Sailing Club - Pakenham	Victoria	Pakenham, Victoria		38°04′01″S 145°26′51″E	Lakeside Sailing Club on Facebook
Loch Sport Boat Club	Victoria	Loch Sport, Victoria		38°03′17″S 147°33′56″E	Loch Sport Boat Club on Facebook / Official website
Lysterfield Sailing Club	Victoria	Lysterfield, Victoria		37°57′56″S 145°18′03″E	Lysterfield Sailing Club on Facebook / Official website
McCrae Yacht Club	Victoria	McCrae, Victoria	1961	38°20′53″S 144°55′39″E	McCrae Yacht Club on Facebook / Official website
Melbourne Sailing Club	Victoria	Kew, Victoria		37°47′47″S 145°02′07″E	
Merricks Yacht Club	Victoria	Balnarring, Victoria		38°24′05″S 145°06′04″E	Merricks Yacht Club on Facebook / Official website
Metung Yacht Racing Club	Victoria	Metung		37°53′16″S 147°51′25″E	Metung Yacht Racing Club on Facebook
Mordialloc Motor Yacht Club	Victoria	Mordialloc, Victoria		38°00′35″S 145°05′14″E	Mordialloc Motor Yacht Club on Facebook
Mordialloc Sailing Club	Victoria	Mordialloc, Victoria		38°00′37″S 145°05′09″E	Mordialloc Sailing Club on Facebook
Mornington Yacht Club	Victoria	Mornington, Victoria		38°12′48″S 145°02′01″E	Mirnington Yacht Club on Facebook
Mount Martha Yacht Club	Victoria	Mount Martha, Victoria		38°15′58″S 145°00′49″E	Mount Martha Yacht Club on Facebook
Newhaven Yacht Squadron	Victoria	Newhaven, Victoria	1962	38°30′47″S 145°21′43″E	Newhaven Yacht Squadron on Facebook / Official website
Ocean Racing Club of Victoria	Victoria	Footscray, Victoria	1949	37°50′25″S 144°58′01″E	Ocean Racing Club of Victoria on Facebook / Official website
Parkdale Yacht Club	Victoria	Parkdale, Victoria	1945	37°59′51″S 145°04′21″E	Parkdale Yacht Club on Facebook / Official website
Point Leo Boat Club	Victoria	Point Leo, Victoria	1960	38°25′23″S 145°04′38″E	Point Leo Boat Club on Facebook / Official website
Port Albert Yacht Club	Victoria	Port Albert	1889	37°50′37″S 144°56′14″E	Port Albert Yacht Club on Facebook / Official website
Port Fairy Yacht Club	Victoria	Port Fairy		38°23′17″S 142°14′32″E	Port Fairy Yacht Club on Facebook / Official website
Port Melbourne Yacht Club	Victoria	Port Melbourne		37°50′37″S 144°56′15″E	Port Melbourne Yacht Club on Facebook / Official website
Portarlington Sailing Club	Victoria	Portarlington	1969	38°06′29″S 144°38′04″E	Portarlingtin Sailing Club on Facebook / Official website
Portland Yacht Club (Australia)	Victoria	Portland, Victoria		38°20′57″S 141°36′24″E	Portland Yacht Club on Facebook / Official website
Queenscliff Cruising Yacht Club	Victoria	Queenscliff, Victoria		38°15′41″S 144°40′03″E	Queenscliff Cruising Yacht Club on Facebook / Official website
Queenscliff Lonsdale Yacht Club	Victoria	Queenscliff, Victoria	1947	38°16′01″S 144°38′55″E	Queenscliff Lonsdale Yacht Club on Facebook / Official website
Ranelagh Yacht Squadron	Victoria	Mount Eliza	1924	38°10′37″S 145°04′43″E	Ranelagh Yacht Squadron on Facebook / Official website
Rhyll Yacht Club	Victoria	Rhyll		38°27′42″S 145°18′37″E	Rhyll Yacht Club on Facebook / Official website
Rosebud Yacht Club	Victoria	Rosebud, Victoria		38°21′21″S 144°54′00″E	Rosebud Yacht Club on Facebook / Official website
Royal Brighton Yacht Club	Victoria	Brighton, Victoria	1875	37°54′33″S 144°59′10″E	Royak Brighton Yacht Club on Facebook / Official website
Royal Geelong Yacht Club	Victoria	Geelong	1859	38°08′45″S 144°22′02″E	Royal Geelong Yacht Club on Facebook / Official website
Royal Melbourne Yacht Squadron	Victoria	St Kilda, Victoria	1876	37°51′48″S 144°58′18″E	Royal Melbourne Yacht Squadron on Facebook / Official website
Royal Victorian Motor Yacht Club	Victoria	Williamstown, Victoria	1904	37°51′38″S 144°54′13″E	Royal Victorian Motor Yacht Club on Facebook / Official website
Royal Yacht Club of Victorian	Victoria	Williamstown, Victoria		37°51′45″S 144°54′22″E	Royak Yacht Club of Victorian on Facebook / Official website
Rye Yacht Club	Victoria	Rye, Victoria	1971	38°22′14″S 144°49′54″E	/ Official website
Safety Beach Sailing Club	Victoria	Safety Beach, Victoria	1967	38°18′26″S 144°59′40″E	Safety Beach Saiking Club on Facebook / Official website
Sandringham Yacht Club	Victoria	Sandringham, Victoria	1903	37°56′45″S 144°59′46″E	Sandringhm Yacht Club on Facebook / Official website
Somers Yacht Club	Victoria	Somers		38°23′38″S 145°09′27″E	Somers Yacht Club on Facebook / Official website
Sorrento Sailing Couta Boat Club	Victoria	Sorrento		38°20′40″S 144°45′19″E	Sorrenti Sailing Ceuta Boat Club on Facebook / Official website
South Gippsland Yacht Club	Victoria	Inverloch		38°38′08″S 145°43′52″E	South Gippsland Yacht Club on Facebook / Official website
Stawell Yacht Club	Victoria	Pomonal		37°08′09″S 142°38′08″E	Stawell Yacht Club on Facebook / Official website
Sugarloaf Sailing Club	Victoria	Sugarloaf Reservoir		37°39′54″S 145°18′43″E	Sugarloaf Sailing Club on Facebook
Torquay Sailing Club	Victoria	Torquay, Victoria		38°19′31″S 144°19′45″E	Torquay Sailing Club on Facebook
Waranga Boat Club Inc	Victoria	Rushworth	1960	36°31′36″S 145°04′56″E	Waranga Boat Club Inc on Facebook / Official website
Warneet Motor Yacht Club	Victoria	Warneet		38°13′36″S 145°18′23″E	Warneet Motor Yacht Club on Facebook
Warrnambool Yacht Club	Victoria	Warrnambool		38°24′04″S 142°28′28″E	Warrnabool Yacht Club on Facebook / Official website
Westernport Yacht Club	Victoria	Balnarring Beach		38°23′26″S 145°07′40″E	Westernport Yacht Club on Facebook / Official website
Williamstown Sailing Club	Victoria	Williamstown	1910	37°51′28″S 144°54′11″E	Williamstiwn Saiking Club on Facebook / Official website
Yarrawonga Yacht Club	Victoria	Yarrawonga	1938	36°00′07″S 146°01′16″E	Yarrawonga Yacht Club on Facebook / Official website
Augusta Yacht Club	Western	Augusta			
Broome Sailing Club	Western	Broome		17°57′43″S 122°11′58″E	
Carnarvon Yacht Club	Western	Carnarvon		24°53′37″S 113°39′13″E	
Dunsborough Bay Yacht Club	Western	Dunsborough			
Claremont Yacht Club	Western	Claremont		31°59′19″S 115°46′46″E	
East Fremantle Yacht Club	Western	East Fremantle		32°01′44″S 115°46′29″E	
Esperance Bay Yacht Club	Western	Esperance		33°51′38″S 121°52′45″E	
Exmouth Yacht Club	Western	Exmouth			
Fremantle Cruising Yacht Club	Western	Fremantle		32°03′58″S 115°44′57″E	
Fremantle Sailing Club	Western	Fremantle		32°04′07″S 115°44′57″E	
Geographe Bay Yacht Club	Western	Busselton		33°39′02″S 115°19′42″E	
Geraldton Yacht Club	Western	Geraldton		28°46′0″S 114°36′40″E	
Hampton Harbour Boat & Sailing Club	Western	Dampier			
Hillarys Yacht Club	Western	Hillarys		31°49′24″S 115°44′17″E	
Jervoise Bay Sailing Club	Western	Munster		32°08′16″S 115°45′46″E	
Koombana Bay Sailing Club	Western	Bunbury			
Maylands Yacht Club	Western	Maylands		31°56′38″S 115°54′43″E	
Mounts Bay Sailing Club	Western	Crawley		31°59′08″S 115°49′33″E	
Nedlands Yacht Club	Western	Nedlands		31°59′40″S 115°48′45″E	
Ocean Reef Sea Sports Club	Western	Ocean Reef		31°45′41″S 115°43′39″E	
Ocean Reef Yacht Club	Western	Ocean Reef		31°45′41″S 115°43′39″E	
Mandurah Offshore Fishing & Sailing Club	Western	Mandurah		32°31′25″S 115°42′57″E	
Port Bouvard Yacht Club	Western	Dawesville			
Port Denison Yacht Club	Western	Port Denison			
Port Hedland Yacht Club	Western	Port Hedland			
Princess Royal Sailing Club	Western	Albany		35°03′53″S 117°52′49″E	
Perth Dinghy Sailing Club	Western	Crawley		31°58′55″S 115°49′17″E	
Perth Flying Squadron Yacht Club	Western	Dalkeith		32°0′03″S 115°48′36″E	
Royal Freshwater Bay Yacht Club	Western	Peppermint Grove		32°00′05″S 115°46′26″E	
Royal Perth Yacht Club	Western	Crawley		31°59′06″S 115°49′27″E	
Safety Bay Yacht Club	Western	Safety Bay		32°18′16″S 115°42′41″E	
Shelley Sailing Club	Western	Shelley		32°01′32″S 115°52′56″E	
South of Perth Yacht Club	Western	Applecross		32°0′11″S 115°50′49″E	
Sun City Yacht Club	Western	Two Rocks		31°29′44″S 115°34′57″E	
Swan Yacht Club	Western	East Fremantle		32°01′37″S 115°45′45″E	
The Cruising Yacht Club of Western Australia	Western	Rockingham		32°16′29″S 115°42′07″E	
Walpole Yacht Club	Western	Walpole			

== See also ==
- List of Australian rules football clubs in Australia
- List of baseball teams in Australia
- List of basketball clubs in Australia
- List of rowing clubs in Australia
- List of rugby league clubs in Australia
- List of rugby union clubs in Australia
- List of soccer clubs in Australia
- List of yacht clubs
