= Launceston to Hobart Yacht Race =

The Launceston to Hobart yacht race is a 285 nautical mile race, commencing at Beauty Point on the Tamar River, with competitors sailing out of the Tamar River, east along the northern coast of Tasmania (eastern Bass Strait), through Banks Strait and south down Tasmania's East Coast, through Mercury Passage between mainland Tasmania and Maria Island, across Storm Bay, to a finish line in the River Derwent. The race departs on 27 December each year. The race is known as the L2H race (Launceston to Hobart) despite the race commencing at Beauty Point, some 45 kilometres north of Launceston.

== Race history ==
The proposal for a Launceston to Hobart Yacht Race originated with the Geilston Bay Boat Club (in southern Tasmania) and the Derwent Sailing Squadron (DSS) (also in southern Tasmania) supported the proposal. The Tamar Yacht Club agreed to cooperate in the staging of the race.

The race was named the Launceston to Hobart and it was to be an annual race held to coincide with the Melbourne to Hobart Yacht Race. The ORCV conducts the Melbourne to Hobart Yacht Race and the DSS conducts the L2H and finishes both events in Hobart. In 2007, for the first time, the Melbourne to Hobart Yacht Race (M2H) allowed entrants to sail to Hobart via the East Coast of Tasmania, now called a Melbourne to Hobart East Coaster. Previously, this race had sailed the treacherous Tasmanian west coast only. A Launceston to Hobart race, means Tasmanian yachts could race over the Christmas to New Year period in a multi day race in Tasmanian waters. It also meant Tasmanian yacht owners avoided the costs and time required to deliver and moor yachts in Sydney and Melbourne prior to the race start dates of 26 December (Sydney to Hobart race) or 27 December (Melbourne to Hobart race).

The plan was that three yacht races, Sydney to Hobart, Melbourne to Hobart and Launceston to Hobart, would a finish at the time of the popular Hobart Summer Festival, which includes the Taste of Tasmania.

On Tuesday 30 October 2007, Hobart Lord Mayor Rob Valentine, launched the race at a ceremony held at the Derwent Sailing Squadron. Attending the launch were the Commodores from the Derwent Sailing Squadron, Bellerive Yacht Club and Royal Yacht Club of Tasmania; Life Members of the Derwent Sailing Squadron; competitors and race officials; and representatives from Clive Peeters sponsor.

== Race Details and Sailing Instructions ==
The race distance is 285 nautical miles (528 km) and commences on 27 December off Inspection Head on the Tamar River at Beauty Point. Prior to the 2009 race started at Low Head at the mouth of the Tamar River in Launceston and race distance was 285 nautical miles (528 km). The race commences mid river, adjacent to the docks at Inspection Head at Beauty Point and the course is north and out the month of the Tamar River at Low Head into Bass Strait, east along the northern coast of Tasmania, through Banks Strait, then south along the east coast, through Mercury Passage (as Maria Island is a mark of the course requiring competitors keep the island to port), around Tasman Island, across Storm Bay and up the River Derwent, to a finish line off Castray Esplanade. The Launceston to Hobart shares the same finish line as the Melbourne to Hobart and Sydney to Hobart Yacht Races.

The Sailing Instructions require yachts to be a minimum of 8.5 metres in length, although those who do not meet these requirements may be granted permission to participate in the cruising division. The race is governed by the rules of the Racing Rules of Sailing (RRS) of the International Sailing Federation (ISAF) together with the prescriptions and safety regulations of Yachting Australia, the International Regulations for the Prevention of Collisions at Sea and, where applicable, the rules and regulations of the International-Rule Club (IRC) where rules 1, 2 and 3.

=== Race Divisions ===
The race offers several divisions for yachts. These are International Racing Certificate (IRC), Australian Measurement System (AMS), Performance Handicap System (PHS) and cruising division for monohulls and multihulls.

Under L2H race rules, the Overall Winner is the yacht with the lowest corrected time under IRC handicap. Previously, the Overall Winner has been eligible for only one trophy and, as a result, the next three boats moved up one place in the AMS and PHS handicap categories. The rules have been changed for the 2012 L2H to enable the Overall Winner to also receive the trophies for any Divisional first places on corrected time.

=== Race Trophy ===
The overall winner of the race, or the handicap winner, collects a perpetual trophy known as the Sphinx Tea Trophy. The trophy is affectionately known as "The Teapot" due to its original use serving tea to the Governor of Tasmania. It was later awarded to George Chevert, the skipper of a yacht named Mabel that won a Derwent Sailing Squadron pennant in 1893.

=== Sponsorship ===
The major sponsor for the inaugural race was furniture retailer Clive Peeters, thus the official naming of the event as the Clive Peeters Launceston to Hobart Yacht Race. The race in 2008 was also known as the 2008 Clive Peeters Launceston to Hobart Yacht Race, in 2009 the Sargisons Jeweller L2H Race, in 2010 the Sargisons Jewellers and Natuzzi L2H Race, in 2011 the Optus L2H Race, in 2012 The Good Guys L2H and 2013, 2014, 2015 and 2016 as the National Pies Launceston to Hobart Yacht Race. The 2017, 2018 and 2019 events were known as the Riversdale Estate Wines L2H. The 2020 and 2021 races were sponsored by TasPorts.

== Inaugural Race - 2007 ==
In the inaugural year in 2007, 17 yachts participated in a number of classes. The inaugural race produced one winner for both line and handicap honors, Host Plus Executive.

Host Plus Executive achieved in the inaugural Launceston to Hobart race what Rani did in the inaugural Sydney to Hobart Yacht Race in 1945, winning line and handicap honors.

== Results ==
=== Line honours winners ===
Year	Number of Starters	Boat name	Model	Skipper	Club	Time
2007	17	Host Plus Executive	Mumm 36	Jeff Cordell	BYC	1 day 18 hours 33 minutes 00 seconds
2008	30	Crotty Legal & Dental	Bakewell-White 45	Gary Smith/Geoff White	DSS/RYCT	1 day 09 hours 33 minutes 58 seconds
2009 ^{1}	33	Mr Kite	Cape/Barrett 40	Andrew Hunn	RYCT	1 day 22 hours 10 minutes 51 seconds
2010	31	Mr Kite	Cape/Barrett 40	Andrew Hunn	RYCT	1 day 16 hours 44 minutes 13 seconds
2011	31	Helsal III	Adams 20	Rob Fisher	RYCT	1 day 16 hours 22 minutes 18 seconds
2012	27	The Fork in the Road	Bakewell-White 45	Gary Smith/Geoff White	DSS/RYCT	1 day 17 hours 53 minutes 0 seconds
2013	28 ^{2}	The Fork in the Road	Bakewell-White 45	Gary Smith/Geoff White	DSS/RYCT	1 day 19 hours 44 minutes 59 seconds
2014	24	The Fork in the Road	Bakewell-White 45	Gary Smith/Geoff White	DSS/RYCT	1 day 12 hours 48 minutes 35 seconds
2015	27	Fork in the Road	Bakewell-White 45	Gary Smith/Geoff White	DSS/RYCT	2 days 00 hours 00 minutes 49 seconds
2016	32	Tilt	Marten 49	Peter Cretan	RYCT	2 days 07 hours 43 minutes 59 seconds
2017	23	The Fork in the Road	Bakewell-White 45	Gary Smith	DSS/RYCT	2 days 6 hours 33 minutes 11 seconds
2018 ^{3}	26	The Fork in the Road	Bakewell-White 45	Gary Smith	DSS/RYCT	2 days 1 hour 25 minutes 45 seconds
2019	19	The Fork in the Road	Bakewell-White 45	Gary Smith	DSS/RYCT	2 days 02 hours 22 minutes 5 seconds
2020 ^{4}	31	Alive	Reichel Pugh 66	Ducan Hine	DSS	1 day 08 hours 02 minutes 16 seconds
2021	24	AdvantEdge	Inglis 47	Andrew Jones	PDYC	2 days 3 hours 16 minutes 12 seconds
2022 ^{5}	9	The Fork in the Road	Bakewell-White 45	Gary Smith	RYCT	2 days 06 hours 21 minutes 46 seconds
2023	20	Porco Rosso	Cookson 50	Paul McCartney	DSS	1 day 12 hours 25 minutes 41 seconds
2024 ^{6}	11	The Fork in the Road	Bakewell-White 45	Gary Smith	RYCT	1 day 10 hours 49 minutes 30 seconds

^{1} Race distance was increased in 2009 (280 to 285 nautical mile course). The 2009 race started from Inspection Head on the Tamar River at Beauty Point instead of at Low Head at the mouth of the river, increasing the length of the race to 285 nautical mile.

^{2} Only seven finishers in fleet.

^{3} Due to lack of wind the start line was changed to a new line six nautical mile down the Tamar River and out of the river at Low Head. There were 8 retirements in 2018.

^{4} Race record.

^{5} The 2022 race started from Lagoon Beach at Low Head due to tide and light weather conditions. There was no result awarded for the race from Beauty Point to Low Head for this year

^{6} The Fork in the Roads line honours win in the 2024 race was the boats 10th line honours victory.

Yacht Clubs: BYC (Bellerive Yacht Club), RYCT (Royal Yacht Club of Tasmania), DSS (Derwent Sailing Squadron), TYC (Tamar Yacht Club), RYCV (Royal Yacht Club of Victoria), KYC (Kettering Yacht Club), PDYC (Port Dalrymple Yacht Club)

=== Overall winners ===
Year	Boat name	Model	Skipper	Club
2010	Footloose	Young 88	Stewart Geeves & Kaye Roberts	GBBC
2011	Masquerade	Morgan 35	Tony Harman	BYC
2012	Penfold Audi Sport	Archambault 31	David Ellis	RYCV
2013	The Fork in the Road	Bakewell-White 45	Gary Smith/Geoff White	DSS/RYCT
2014	Steelin Time	Knoop 32	Allan Warren	GBBC
2015	Off-Piste	Beneteau Oceanis 34	Paul Einoder	RYCT
2016 ^{1}	Emotional Rescue	Hobbie 33	Micheal Hutchinson	DSS
2016 ^{1}	Mr Burger (Wings Three)	Northshore 38	Peter Haros	DSS
2017	Mako	Farr D#54	Phil Soley	BYC
2018 ^{2}	Philosopher	Sydney 36CR	Shaun and Sam Tiedemann	DSS
2019	Vertigo	Summit 35	Tim Olding	RYCV
2020	Detail First	Farr 1104	Scott Broadby	BYC
2021 ^{3}	Filepro	Lyons 40	Tim Gadsby & Graham Watkins	DSS
2022	Sundowner	Adams 12	Alice Grubb/Tom Stearnes	DSS
2023	Porco Rosso	Cookson 50	Paul McCartney	DSS
2024	Prion	Mount Gay 30 Lyons	Donovan Oak	DSS

^{1} Emotional Rescue was the provisional overall winner, but Mr Burger (Wings Three) lodged an appeal with the jury, seeking redress for time lost in going to the aid of follow competitor Rumbeat. Rumbeat had lost steering near Waterhouse Island in Bass Strait and was towed by Mr Burger. The L2H jury granted Mr Burger redress for the time lost. Both yachts had the same corrected time after the application of the redress and were declared joint overall winners.

^{2} Philosopher was granted redress of 20 minutes after standing by the dismasted RAD off Tasman Island at the height of the 50–60 knot north-westerly storm in the early hours of morning of the 29 December 2018.

^{3} The Overall Winner is the yacht with the lowest corrected time under IRC Handicaps. Previously, the Overall Winner has been eligible for only one trophy and, as a result the next three boats moved up one place in the IRC, ORC and PHS handicap categories. The rules have been changed for the 2021 L2H to enable the Overall Winner to also receive the trophies for any Divisional first places on corrected time.

=== All results ===
Year	AMS - 1st	AMS - 2nd	AMS - 3rd	IRC - First	IRC - Second	IRC - 3rd	PHS - 1st	PHS - 2nd	PHS - 3rd	Other
2007	No AMS Fleet	No AMS Fleet	No AMS Fleet	Host Plus Executive Mumm 36 Jeff Cordell, BYC	Asylum Sydney 38 Dianne Barkas, RYCT/DSS	X-Rated X-35 David Creese, BYC	Host Plus Executive Mumm 36 Jeff Cordell, BYC	Haphazard Adams/Radford 49 Nick Edmunds, TYC	Lock on Wood Dubois 9.5m Peter Geeves, DSS	
2008	No AMS Fleet	No AMS Fleet	No AMS Fleet	Creese Property Sydney 38 David Creese, BYC	Asylum Sydney 38 Dianne Barkas, RYCT/DSS	Archie Archambault 35 Sally Rattle, DSS	Creese Property Sydney 38 David Creese, BYC	Asylum Sydney 38 Dianne Barkas, RYCT/DSS	Haphazard Adams/Radford 49 Nick Edmunds, TYC	
2009	Whistler Dovell 38 David Rees, RYCT	Pisces Sydney 36 David Taylor, RYCT/DSS	Blue Sky Beneteau 40.7 Richard Fisher, TYC	Pisces Sydney 36 David Taylor, RYCT/DSS	Whistler Dovell 38 David Rees, RYCT	The Fork in the Road Bakewell-White 45 Gary Smith/Geoff White, DSS/RYCT	Blue Sky Beneteau 40.7 Richard Fisher, TYC	Whistler Dovell 38 David Rees, RYCT	42 South Stompcraft 38 Mark Ballard, BYC	Multi-hull 1st. Deguello Crowther 14.6 John Brierley, RYCT 2nd. Storm Bay Chamberlain 14.0 Stephen Laird, RYCT
2010	2 Unlimited Melges 32 Greg Prescott, RYCT	Lock on Wood Dubois 9.5 Peter Geeves, DSS	Wings Three Northshore 38 Peter Haros, DSS	Intrigue Castro 40 David Calvert, RYCT	2 Unlimited Melges 32 Greg Prescott, RYCT	Matangi Frers 39 David Stephenson, TYC	Lock on Wood Dubois 9.5 Peter Geeves, DSS	2 Unlimited Melges 32 Greg Prescott, RYCT	Wings Three Northshore 38 Peter Haros, DSS	
2011	Masquerade Morgan 35 Tony Harman, BYC	Archie Archambault 35 Sally Rattle, DSS	Host Plus Executive Mumm 36 Jeff Cordell, BYC	Archie Archambault 35 Sally Rattle, DSS	Pisces Sydney 36 mod David Taylor, RYCT	Penfold Audi Sport Archambault 31 David Ellis, RYCV	Masquerade Morgan 35 Tony Harman, BYC	Allusive Lyon 14 John Joyce, TYC	'Ramrod Kaufman 36 Royce Salter, RYCT	
2012	Penfold Audi Sport Archambault 31 David Ellis, RYCV	Hot Prospect Farr 1104 Ian Marshall, GBBC	Moonshadow Lotus 10.6 Anthony Ellis, DSS	Penfold Audi Sport Archambault 31 David Ellis, RYCV	The Fork in the Road Bakewell-White 52 Gary Smith/Geoff White, DSS/RYCT	The Protagonist Beneteau First 45 Stuart Denney, BYC	Moonshadow Lotus 10.6 Anthony Ellis, DSS	Penfold Audi Sport Archambault 31 David Ellis, RYCV	Obsession Sydney 38 David Allen, TYC	
2013	Fork in the Road Bakewell-White 45 Gary Smith/Geoff White, DSS/RYCT	Fish Frenzy Modified Farr 50 Stephen Keal, BYC	CDC Development (TAS) Farr 1104 Ian Marshall, GBBC/BYC	Fork in the Road Bakewell-White 45 Gary Smith/Geoff White, DSS/RYCT			Bellandean Jarkan 38 Andrew Scott, HYC	Fork in the Road Bakewell-White 45 Gary Smith/Geoff White, DSS/RYCT	Fish Frenzy Modified Farr 50 Stephen Keal, BYC	
2014	Steelin Time Knoop 32 Allan Warren, GBBC	Off-Piste Beneteau Oceanis 34 Paul Einoder, RYCT	Silicon Ship Knoop 32 David Wyatt/Gordon Clark, BYC	Kaiulani Snook 30 Malcolm Cooper, DSS	Off-Piste Beneteau Oceanis 34 Paul Einoder, RYCT	The Fork in the Road Bakewell-White 45 Gary Smith/Geoff White, DSS/RYCT	Off-Piste Beneteau Oceanis 34 Paul Einoder, RYCT	Steelin Time Knoop 32 Allan Warren, GBBC	Kaiulani Snook 30 Malcolm Cooper, DSS	
2015	Off-Piste Beneteau Oceanis 34 Paul Einoder, RYCT	Emotional Rescue Hobie 33 Michael Hutchinson, DSS	Silicon Ship Knoop 32 David Wyatt/Gordon Clark, BYC	Off-Piste Beneteau Oceanis 34 Paul Einoder, RYCT	Martela IMX38 Tony Williams/Andrew Davison, BYC	Kaiulani Snook 30 Malcolm Cooper, DSS	Lawless Green 31 Stephen McElwee, PDYC	Off-Piste Beneteau Oceanis 34 Paul Einoder, RYCT	Silicon Ship Knoop 32 David Wyatt/Gordon Clark, BYC	Cruising: Mistraal Beneteau 57 Jacinta and Brett Cooper, DSS/RYCT
2016	Emotional Rescue Hobbie 33 Micheal Hutchinson DSS and Mr Buger (Wings Three) Northshore 38 Peter Haros, DSS		Young One Young 88 Gerard Smith, BYC	Absolut Archambault 35 Richard Gate, RYCV	Masquerade Morgan 35 Tony Harman, BYC	B&G Advantage Mumm 36 Jeff Cordell, BYC	Young One Young 88 Gerard Smith, BYC	Kaiulani Snook 30 Malcolm Cooper, DSS	Mr Buger (Wings Three) Northshore 38 Peter Haros, DSS	
2017	Mako Farr D#54 Phil Soley, BYC	Prion Lyons Mount Gay 30 John Dryden,	Footloose Young 88 Stewart Geeves, RYCT/GBBC	Mako Farr D#54 Phil Soley, BYC	B&G Advantage Mumm 36 Jeff Cordell, BYC	Team Whistle Mbd36 David Aplin	Mako Farr D#54 Phil Soley, BYC	Footloose Young 88 Stewart Geeves, RYCT/GBBC	Ultimate Challenge Dubois 40 Peter Jenkins, DSS	
2018	Off-Piste Beneteau Oceanis 34 Paul EInoder, RYCT	Philosopher Sydney 36cr Shaun Tiedemann, DSS	Footloose Young 88 Stewart Geeves, RYCT/GBBC	Philosopher Sydney 36cr Shaun Tiedemann, DSS	Footloose Young 88 Stewart Geeves, RYCT/GBBC	Lawless Green 31 Stephen McElwee, PDYC	Crescendo Dufour Gib-Sea 43 Vaughan Lynch, BYC	Lawless Green 31 Stephen McElwee, PDYC	Off-Piste Beneteau Oceanis 34 Paul EInoder, RYCT	
2019	Vertigo Summit 35 Tim Olding, RYCV	Talofa Northshore 38 Rob Cawthorn, KYC	Heat Wave Mumm 36 Michael Keal, BYC	Vertigo Summit 35 Tim Olding, RYCV	Heat Wave Mumm 36 Michael Keal, BYC	Ambition Custom 32 Michael Jones, PDYC	Ambition Custom 32 Michael Jones, PDYC	RAD Radford 35l Brent McKay, KYC	Frontline Elan S4 Ian Snape, RYCT	
2020	Detail First Farr 1104 Scott Broadby, BYC	Talofa Northshore 38 Rob Cawthorn, KYC	Jazz Player Bakewel-White Z39 John Dryden,	'Detail First Farr 1104 Scott Broadby, BYC	Heat Wave Brierley MC Mumm 36 Michael Keal, BYC	Hip-Nautiic Jeanneau Sunfast 3300 Jean Ravanat,	Detail First Farr 1104 Scott Broadby, BYC	Talofa Northshore 38 Rob Cawthorn, KYC	Twitch Eureka 31" Will Keynes, RYCT	ORCi: Detail First Farr 1104 Scott Broadby, BYC
2021	Footloose Young 88 Stewart Geeves, RYCT	Rumbeat Farr 1104 Justin Barr, DSS	Kraken Cookson 12 Mark Bayles/Andrew Sinclair, DSS	'Filepro Lyons 40 Tim Gadsby and Graham Watkins, DSS	Footloose Young 88 Stewart Geeves, RYCT	Kraken Cookson 12 Mark Bayles/Andrew Sinclair, DSS	Rumbeat Farr 1104 Justin Barr, DSS	Footloose Young 88 Stewart Geeves, RYCT	Invincible Farr 1104" Bryan Walpole – RYCT	City of Hobart Trophy 1st yacht under 10 m on PHS: Footloose Young 88 Stewart Geeves, RYCT
2022	No AMS Fleet replaced by ORC AP Sundowner Adams 12 Alice Grubb and Tom Stearnes, DSS	No AMS Fleet replaced by ORC AP Zephyr Insurance Masters Farr 41MX Ian Johnston, DSS	No AMS Fleet replaced by ORC AP Heatwave Fish Frenzy Mumm 36 Matthew Keal, BYC	Sundowner Adams 12 Alice Grubb and Tom Stearnes, DSS	Zephyr Insurance Masters Farr 41MX Ian Johnston, DSS	Heatwave Fish Frenzy Mumm 36 Matthew Keal, BYC	Big Pup Swarbrick S111 Teresa Badcock/Anton Bezemer, PDYC	Force Eleven Adams 11.9 Force Eleven Cartel, BYC	Sundowner Adams 12 Alice Grubb and Tom Stearnes, DSS	

BYC - Bellerive Yacht Club; DSS - Derwent Sailing Squadron; GBBC - Geilston Bay Boat Club; KYC - Kettering Yacht Club; PDYC - Port Dalrymple Yacht Club; RYCT - Royal Yacht Club of Tasmania;

== See also ==
- List of events in Tasmania
