= St Kilda Beach, Victoria =

Beach in St Kilda, Port Phillip, Victoria, Australia

Coordinates: 37°51′50″S 144°58′55″E

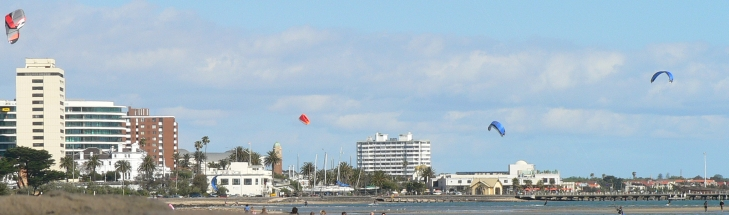
Kitesurfing on St Kilda Beach

St Kilda Beach is a beach located in St Kilda, Port Phillip, Victoria, Australia, 6 kilometres (3.7 mi) south from the Melbourne city centre. It is Melbourne's most famous beach. The beach is a sandy beach about 700 metres (2,300 ft) long between St Kilda Marina and St Kilda Harbour along Jacka Boulevard and St Kilda Esplanade. It is located at the north-east corner of Port Phillip and is protected from ocean swell, though still affected by strong westerly winds. With Port Phillip Bay being open to the sea, St Kilda Beach is subject to regular tides.

The St Kilda Sea Baths are located at the beach.

The St Kilda Pier is another landmark. The pier is terminated by the St Kilda Pavilion, an eccentric Edwardian building in the mould of English pier pavilions which is considered of high cultural importance to Melburnians. It was recently reconstructed and listed on the Victorian Heritage Register after burning down. The pier has a long breakwater which shelters St Kilda Harbour and hosts a little penguin colony. There are around 1400 penguins in the colony.

St Kilda Beach is one of the 46 bayside beaches which are monitored by EPA Victoria for water quality. St Kilda Beach water quality is generally rated as good (the highest rating given by EPA), being below 150 orgs/100 mL, which is set in the State Environment Protection Policy (Waters of Victoria) 2003. The water quality is considerably lower for about 24 hours after rains, which flush stormwater drains. The reading exceeded the enterococci investigation trigger of 500 orgs/100 mL on 28 December 2009. This was short-lived, with bacterial levels returning below the investigation trigger the next day. The cause of the high reading was attributed to a oneoff, unidentified discharge into a stormwater drain, which is located close to the sampling site at St Kilda Beach.

== Recreational activities ==
Besides swimming, sunbathing takes place on the beach as well as the grass area adjacent to it. People also engage in other watersport activities, such as windsurfing, sailing, kitesurfing, rollerblading, beach volleyball, jetskiing and waterskiing. A skate park for the Fitzroy Street end of Albert Park is in the planning stages. There is also a boardwalk, and another walking track along the beach and a bicycle track.

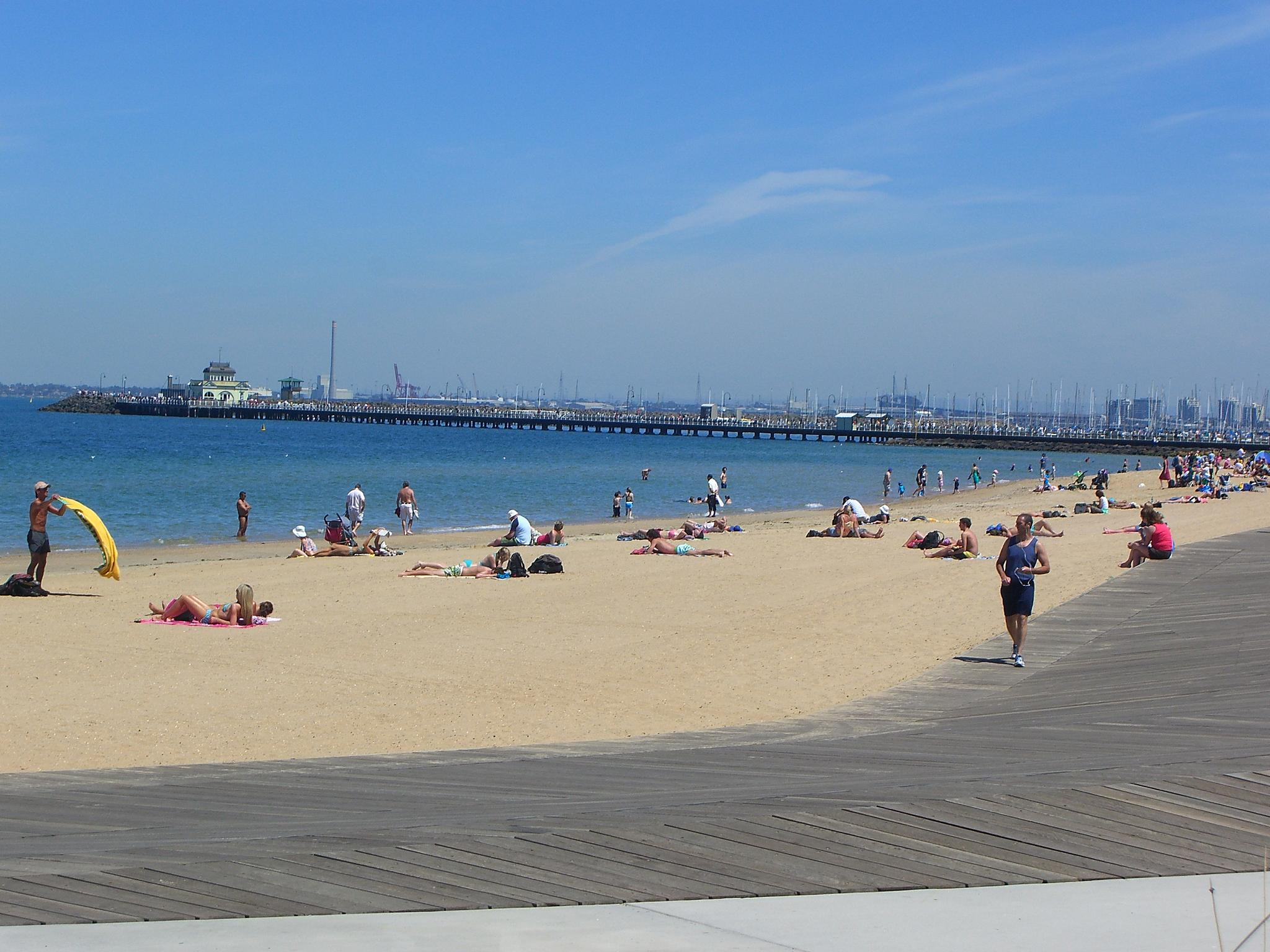
Quiet before midday - St Kilda Beach and Pier

St Kilda Beach is the home of the Royal Melbourne Yacht Squadron, which began in the early 1870s as the St Kilda Sailing Club, with the present clubhouse dating to the 1920s and the St Kilda Lifesaving Club, which was established in 1911. A large number of sporting tournaments and cultural events are staged on the beach or on the parklands adjoining the beach.

The roads which run alongside St Kilda Beach are popular for many sporting events, such as marathons and bicycle racing.

== History ==
Early lithograph (1864) of St Kilda main beach looking toward west beach and Port Melbourne.

In the early years of Melbourne, the Yarra River and the other creeks of Melbourne were used for bathing and for drinking water. By the 1850s, however, the Yarra was becoming quite polluted, though people continued to bathe in it and drink the water. Until the 1850s, sea bathing was not generally considered acceptable. It was permitted within large timber structures as protection from predatory marine life, and away from prying eyes. The St Kilda Sea Baths were opened in 1860, and provided separate sections for men and women. Women were protected from the sight of men bathing because men frequently bathed naked. Sea bathing was popular as it was considered to have health benefits, as was exposure to the sun. Throughout the nineteenth century, there were as many as six different sea baths operating along the St Kilda shore. The Melbourne to St Kilda railway line, which had opened in 1857, as well as the St Kilda to Windsor loop line brought large numbers of people to the privately run St Kilda Sea Baths, located at the beach. The Esplanade Hotel was built in 1878.

The building of cable tram lines in Melbourne increased the easy accessibility of the beach, with a line running from Windsor Station through St Kilda Junction, down Fitzroy Street, past St Kilda Station, around the Upper Esplanade to terminate in Acland Street, opening in 1891. The construction of the line involved the rebuilding and widening of the Upper Esplanade, creating the supporting wall at the northern end that accommodated a row of shops facing the pier (the walled off spaces still exist now known as the vaults). In 1913, electric trams arrived in St Kilda when the Prahran & Malvern Tramways Trust built a line along Carlisle Street from their rapidly expanding network throughout the eastern suburbs, connecting Kew, Camberwell, Malvern and Caulfield to St Kilda. These lines terminated at a loop built in 1916 that ran around a cafe (now McDonald's) in front of Luna Park, connecting St Kilda directly to a large parts of the city.

The St Kilda Foreshore Committee was created in 1906, charged with overseeing improvements and bringing some organisation to the neglected foreshore from West Beach, South Melbourne, to Point Ormond. There were representatives from St Kilda Council and State Government, including Carlo Catani, Chief Engineer of the Public Works Department, who, in his spare time, designed the extensive parks, gardens and landscaping over the next 10 years. The plan included avenues of palm trees and paths, picturesque planting of cypresses as wind-breaks, as well as rockeries with seating nooks and feature shrubberies. Such was public affection for Catani that three features are named after him; the formal gardens at West Beach, an ornamental arch, and a memorial clocktower built on the Upper Esplanade after his death.

Notable features in the early years included the St Kilda Yacht Club, the St Kilda Pier with its kiosk (1904), the new domed St Kilda Sea Baths (1906), a tea pavilion on the foreshore (later known as the Stokehouse), Dreamland amusement park (1906 to 1909), replaced by Luna Park (1912), the Palais de Danse (1913-1969), the Palais Theatre (1919,1927), and on the Upper Esplanade the Wattle Path Dance Hall (1923, converted into the St Moritz Ice Rink 1939).

St Kilda Council's bye-law prohibited ‘open sea’ bathing, ie. not within an enclosure, and bathing on Sundays and on Christmas and Easter. The bye-law was first challenged by the Open Sea Bathers' League whose members entered the water in 1912, without being arrested. Open-sea bathing was legalised in 1917, with separate areas allocated for men and women and mixed bathing being prohibited. The prohibition to Sunday bathing was not revoked until 1922. By the time that the cable tram line on the Upper Esplanade was converted to electric in 1925, open-sea bathing was becoming more popular, with increasing numbers of people bathing in the open-sea, to the loss of patronage at the sea baths. To cater for the need, St Kilda Council erected three open-sea changing pavilions along its foreshore: at West St Kilda, on Beaconsfield Parade; at St Kilda Beach (at 40 Jacka Boulevard, which still survives as a restaurant); and at Elwood (Ormond Esplanade, demolished in 1971). The beach pavilions proved more popular than the sea baths.

Standards of acceptable 'decency' and dress at St Kilda Beach, as along Victorian beaches in general, were the subject of vigorous local debate. 'Mixed bathing', that is men and women mingling freely in the water, was legalised in 1927. In 1938, 'mixed bathing' in the St Kilda Sea Baths was restricted to weekends and only in the ladies' section. However, during World War II (1939–45) nude sunbathing made an appearance on St Kilda beaches. Also in 1945, Sidney Nolan, who was living in St Kilda, painted the beach and the Sea Baths, and in works such as The Bathers and St Kilda painted nude sunbathers.

In 2026, the City of Port Phillip temporarily renamed the beach to Patrick Beach after the Socceroos player in honour of the team reaching the round of 32 in the FIFA World Cup 2026.
