= Melbourne to Hobart Yacht Race =

Melbourne to Hobart Ocean Yacht Race
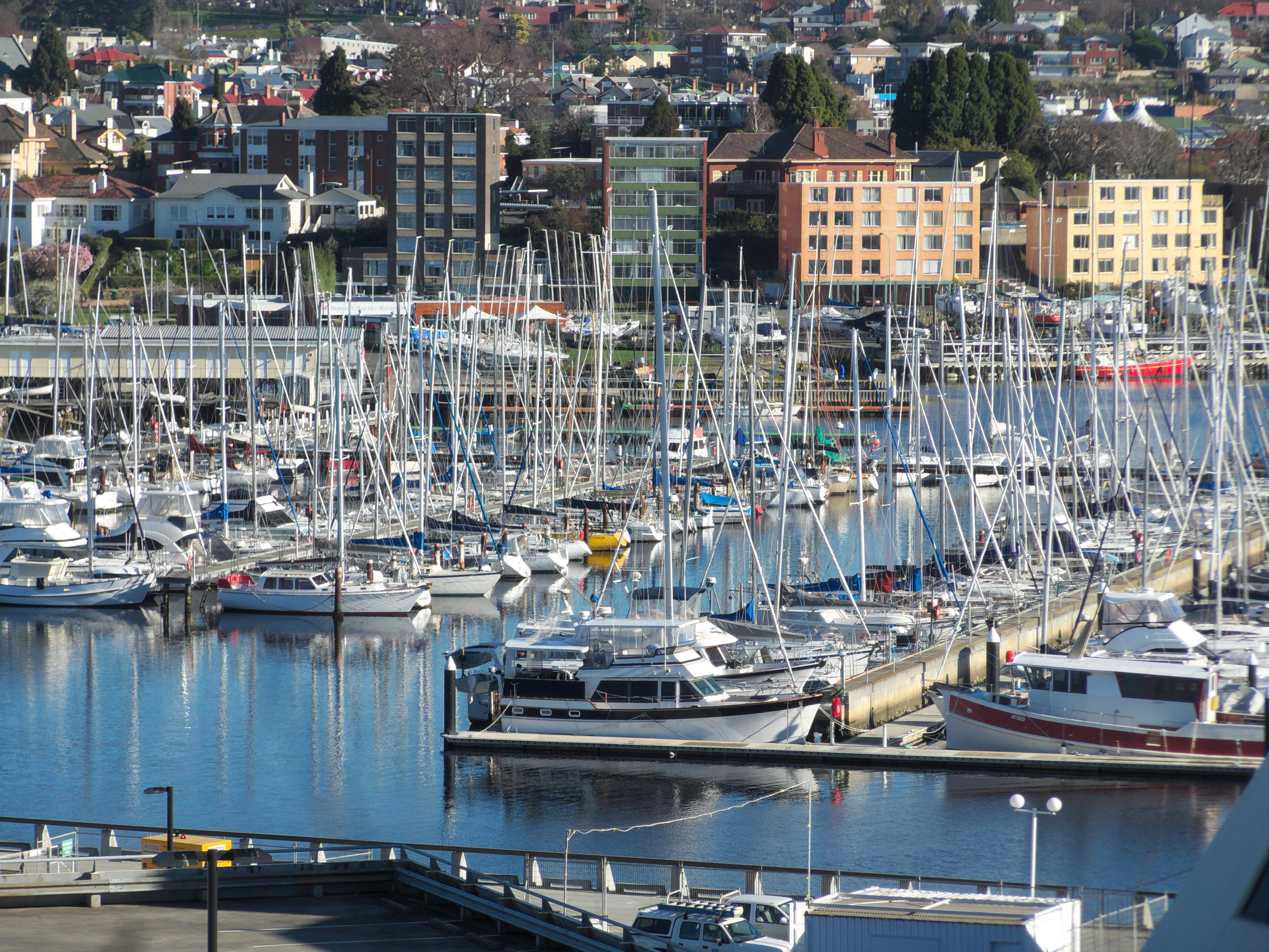
- Derwent Sailing Squadron, Hobart
- First held: 1972
- Organizer: Ocean Racing Club of Victoria (ORCV)
- Venue: Port Phillip, Victoria to Hobart, Tasmania
- Length: 435 nautical miles (806 km)
- Website: www.orcv.org.au/hobart

Commonly known as the Westcoaster, the Melbourne to Hobart Ocean Yacht Race (also known as M2H) commences annually from Port Phillip, Victoria, and concludes in Hobart, Tasmania. It is organised by the Ocean Racing Club of Victoria (ORCV) and starts annually on 27 December, running concurrently with the Sydney to Hobart Yacht Race.

Covering approximately 435 nautical miles (806 km), the Westcoaster is widely regarded as one of Australia's most challenging blue-water sailing events due to its passage along the exposed, wave-swept west coast of Tasmania. The traditional "Westcoaster" course covers approximately 435 nautical miles and is divided into three distinct phases. Competitors depart Portsea in Port Phillip, clear the treacherous tidal currents of the Heads, and head south-southwest across Bass Strait, passing to the east or west of King Island. Vessels then navigate down the west coast of Tasmania, directly exposed to heavy Roaring Forties winds and Southern Ocean swells, passing landmarks including Cape Sorell and the Maatsuyker Islands. After rounding South East Cape (the southernmost point of Australia's coastal passage) the fleet turns northeast across Storm Bay, passing the Iron Pot to finish in the River Derwent off Castray Esplanade in Hobart.

== History ==
=== Origins and early years ===
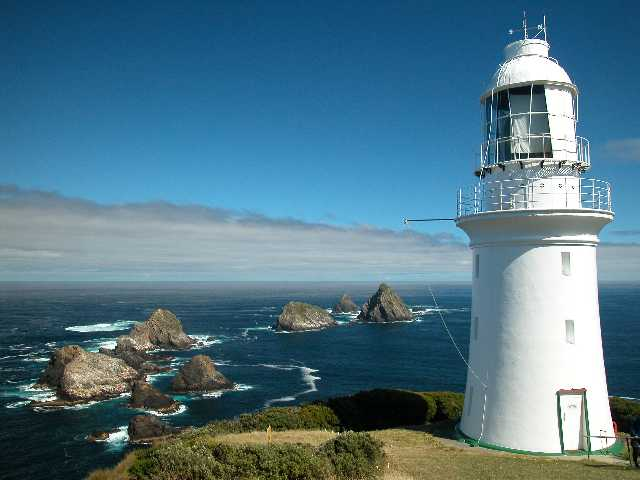
Maatsuyker lighthouse

The Melbourne to Hobart Ocean Yacht Race was devised in 1971 by Stan Gibson of the Ocean Racing Club of Victoria (ORCV) and Dr Joe Cannon of the Derwent Sailing Squadron as an alternative for Victorian and South Australian sailors wishing to reach Hobart for New Year celebrations without requiring them to first sail their vessels to Sydney to participate in the Sydney to Hobart Yacht Race. Although the selected route down Tasmania's west coast initially faced scepticism over safety concerns, Gibson's meteorological analysis and sponsorship from businessman Donald Trescowthick helped establish the event. Attracting 15 entries, the inaugural race was held in 1972. Starting off Queenscliff on Boxing Day, Peter Riddle's Mary Blair claimed line honours in 2 days, 16 hours, and 19 minutes, while John Marion's Ailsa won the overall Heemskerk Trophy. In its early decades, the race received financial backing from the Victorian and Tasmanian state governments; during the 1970s, place-getters were famously awarded gold and silver ingots, including hand-painted solid silver ingots created by artist Pro Hart in 1976.

=== Development and fleet milestones ===
Melbourne to Hobart Westcoaster course

In 1976, Dr Tony Fisher's 72-foot ferro-cement maxi Helsal set a long-standing record of 2 days, 7 hours, and 18 minutes. Wiley Jim Searle and his son Neil achieved a record four consecutive overall handicap victories between 1977 and 1980 aboard Hot Prospect and Relentless.

Driven by intense blue-water competition, fleet sizes expanded through the 1980s despite losing financial support from the Victorian Government in 1982.

The race record fell again in 1986 to John Lake's Steinman 52 Flying Colours (2d 3h 19m), and was broken in 1990 by Grant Wharington's Wild Thing (2d 0h 20m). During the 1990 race, yachting photographer Richard Bennett captured an iconic image of Wild Thing surfing down 10-metre Southern Ocean swells, which won international accolades. The 25th anniversary race in 1996 drew a record fleet of 74 yachts, with Peter Hansen's PL Lease Management setting a new course record of 1 day, 23 hours, 15 minutes, and 38 seconds—the first sub-two-day completion.

=== Notable weather and safety record ===
Over its history, the race has maintained a strong safety record. However, extreme Southern Ocean conditions have periodically tested the fleet. In 1999, severe conditions saw 19 out of 20 starters retire; Nigel Jones and the crew of Cadibarra 7 were the sole finishers after choosing a tactical passage to the west of King Island to weather 45-knot winds and 5-metre seas. Heavy windless calm has also proved challenging, such as in 1981, 2004, and 2019, when large portions of the fleet were becalmed.

=== The Eastcoaster option ===
In 2007, to mark the centenary of the Rudder Cup, the ORCV temporarily redirected the race down Tasmania's east coast via Low Head and Banks Strait. Following positive feedback, a permanent secondary division known as the Eastcoaster was formally established, offering an alternate east-coast passage starting from Portsea and passing Cape Schanck and Wilsons Promontory.

== Race records ==
- Monohull line honours: 1d 17h 28m 59s — Shortwave (Skipper: Matthew Short, NSW), 2008
- Multihull line honours: 1d 13h 31m 50s — Rushour (Skipper: Drew Carruthers, QLD), 2024

== Past winners ==
The Heemskirk Trophy is awarded to the overall winner on corrected time under the principal measurement handicap system of the race.

Melbourne to Hobart Ocean Yacht Race winners
Year	Line Honours	Overall Winner (Heemskirk Trophy)	AMS Handicap	IRC / IMS Handicap	PHS / ORC / PHD Handicap
1972	Ailsa (Vic)	Ailsa (Vic)	—	—	—
1973	Appaloosa (Vic)	Appaloosa (Vic)	—	—	—
1974	Pagan (Vic)	Pagan (Vic)	—	—	—
1975	Rovama (Vic)	Rovama (Vic)	—	—	—
1976	Helsal (Vic)	Monsoon (Vic)	—	—	—
1977	Anaconda (Tas)	Hot Prospect (Vic)	Relentless (Vic)	—	—
1978	Hot Prospect (Vic)	Hot Prospect (Vic)	Relentless (Vic)	—	—
1979	Hot Prospect (Vic)	Hot Prospect (Vic)	Relentless (Vic)	—	—
1980	Nimrod II (SA)	Relentless (Vic)	—	—	—
1981	Apollo II (Vic)	Apollo II (Vic)	—	—	—
1982	Solandra (Tas)	Solandra (Vic)	—	—	—
1983	Morning Hustler (Vic)	Morning Hustler (Vic)	—	—	—
1984	Eastern Morning (Vic)	Eastern Morning (Vic)	—	—	—
1985	Solandra (Vic)	Solandra (Vic)	—	—	—
1986	Flying Colours (Vic)	Seawulater (Vic)	—	—	—
1987	Challenge 3 (Vic)	Challenge 3 (Vic)	—	—	—
1988	Prime Suspect (Vic)	Prime Suspect (Vic)	—	—	Bagatelle (Vic)
1989	Helsal II (SA)	Sunsmart (Vic)	—	—	—
1990	Wild Thing (Vic)	Paladin (Vic)	Paladin (Vic)	—	—
1991	Ronstan Wild Thing (Vic)	Friction (Vic)	—	—	—
1992	Quit for Life (Vic)	Quit for Life (Vic)	—	—	—
1993	By Order of the Secretary (Vic)	By Order of the Secretary (Vic)	—	—	—
1994	Scarborough of Cerberus (Vic)	Scarborough of Cerberus (Vic)	—	—	—
1995	Second Term (Vic)	Second Term (Vic)	—	—	—
1996	Brighton Star (Vic)	Brighton Star (Vic)	—	—	—
1997	Island Trader (Vic)	Island Trader (Vic)	Island Trader (Vic)	—	Granny Apple (Vic)
1998	Longitude (Vic)	Back in Business (Vic)	Longitude (Vic)	—	Tevake (Vic)
1999	Cadibarra 7 (Vic)	Cadibarra 7 (Vic)	Cadibarra 7 (Vic)	Cadibarra 7 (Vic) (Note: Scored under IMS rules.)	Cadibarra 7 (Vic)
2000	Wild One (Vic)	Tevake (Vic)	Tevake (Vic)	Anaconda (Vic)	Sea Eagle (Vic)
2001	Kontrol (Vic)	Island Trader (Vic)	Island Trader (Vic)	Tilting at Windmills (Vic)	San Miguel (Vic)
2002	Kontrol (Vic)	Deja Blue (Vic)	Deja Blue (Vic)	Magazan 53 (Vic)	Deja Blue (Vic)
2003	Indec Merit (Vic)	Wavelength (Vic)	Wavelength (Vic)	Magazan 53 (Vic)	Rum Beat (Vic)
2004	Quetzalcoatl (Tas)	Under Capricorn (Vic)	Under Capricorn (Vic)	Under Capricorn (Vic)	Under Capricorn (Vic)
2005	Helsal II (Vic)	Quetzalcoatl (Tas)	Tevake II (Vic)	Quetzalcoatl (Tas)	BOOTS (Vic)
2006	No Fearr (Vic)	A Crewed Interest (Vic)	A Crewed Interest (Vic)	A Crewed Interest (Vic)	A Crewed Interest (Vic)
2007	Race run via East Coast (Rudder Cup Centenary)				
2008	Shortwave (NSW)	Shortwave (NSW)	Tevake II (Vic)	Shortwave (NSW)	Spirit of Downunder (Vic)
2009	Jazz Player (Vic)	Alien (Vic)	Alien (Vic)	Jazz Player (Vic)	Jazz Player (Vic)
2010	Gusto (Vic)	Enchantress (SA)	Enchantress (SA)	Enchantress (SA)	Enchantress (SA)
2011	Extasea (Vic)	Alien (Vic)	Alien (Vic)	Extasea (Vic)	Alien (Vic)
2012	Extasea (Vic)	Tevake II (Vic)	Tevake II (Vic)	Bandit (Vic)	Tevake II (Vic)
2013	Extasea (Vic)	Tevake II (Vic)	Tevake II (Vic)	Extasea (Vic)	Tevake II (Vic)
2014	Spirit of Downunder (Vic)	Seduction (Vic)	Seduction (Vic)	Seduction (Vic)	Seduction (Vic)
2015	Extasea (Vic)	Extasea (Vic)	Extasea (Vic)	Extasea (Vic)	Extasea (Vic)
2016	Cadibarra 8 (Vic)	Cadibarra 8 (Vic)	Cadibarra 8 (Vic)	Cadibarra 8 (Vic)	Cadibarra 8 (Vic)
2017	Spirit of Downunder (Vic)	Alien (Vic)	Alien (Vic)	Alien (Vic)	Force 11 (Vic)
2018	Oskana (Tas)	Whistler (Tas)	Whistler (Tas)	Whistler (Tas)	Whistler (Tas)
2019	Lord Jiminy (Vic)	Archie (Vic)	Archie (Vic)	Archie (Vic)	Soiree Bleu (Vic)
2020	Race cancelled due to COVID-19 pandemic				
2021	Lord Jiminy (Vic)	Faster Forward (Vic)	Faster Forward (Vic)	—	Audere (Vic)
2022	Maritimo (Qld)	Maritimo (Qld)	Maritimo (Qld)	Maritimo (Qld)	Maritimo (Qld)
2023	Ryujin (Vic)	Alien (Vic)	Alien (Vic)	—	Maverick (Vic)
2024	Scarlet Runner (Vic)	Scarlet Runner (Vic)	Scarlet Runner (Vic)	—	Scarlet Runner (Vic)
2025	The Jackal (Vic)	Alien (Vic)	Alien (Vic)	—	Alien (Vic)

== See also ==
- Sydney to Hobart Yacht Race
- Melbourne to Launceston Yacht Race
- Ocean Racing Club of Victoria
- List of events in Tasmania
