= St Kilda Pier =

Pier in St Kilda, Melbourne, Australia

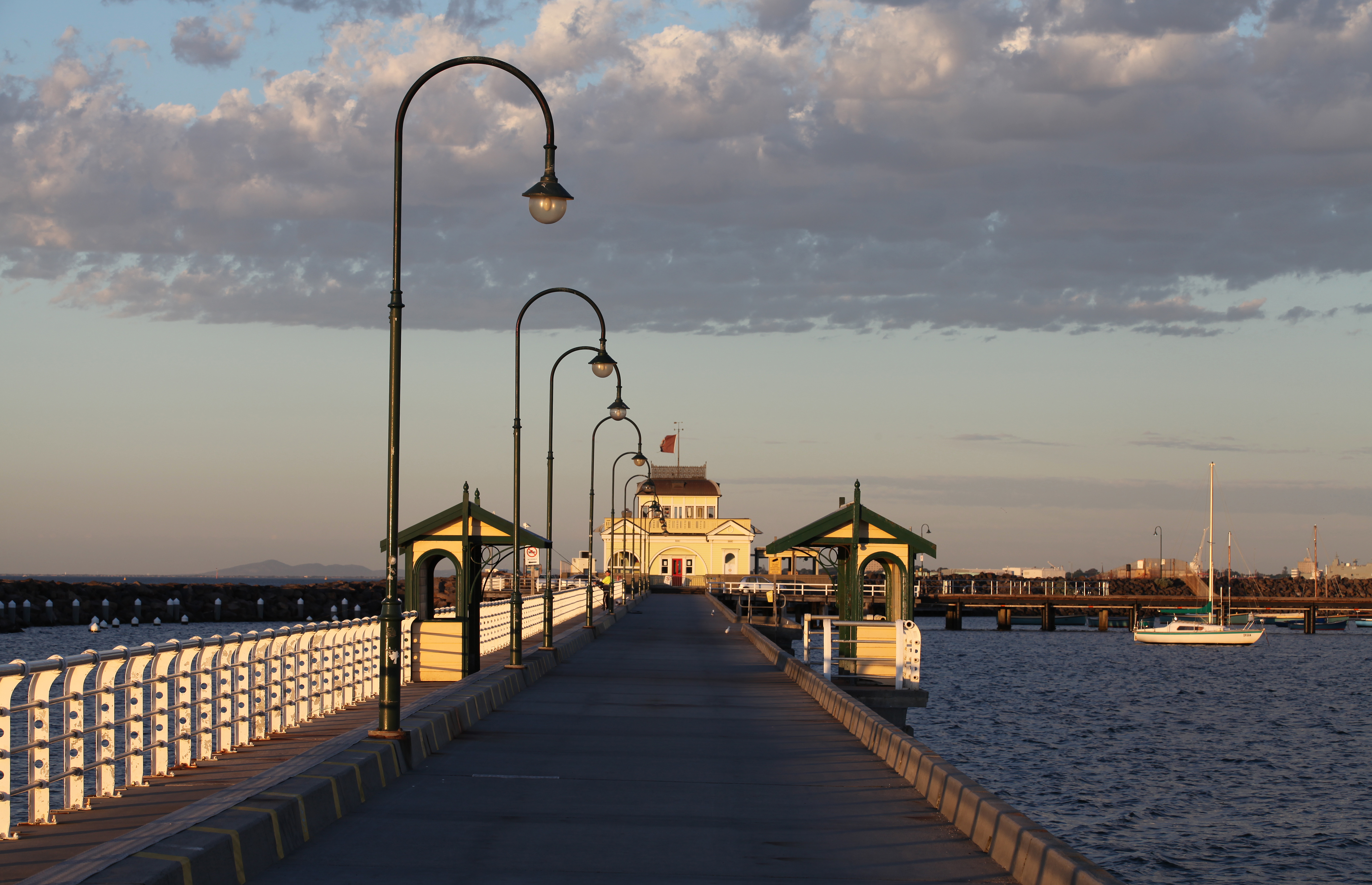
- St Kilda Pier and Kiosk Pavilion, 2014

- Location in Melbourne
- 37°51′53″S 144°58′04″E
- Location: Port Phillip, Jacka Boulevard, St Kilda, Victoria, Australia

History
- Built: 1853 private jetty, 1855 public pier
- Rebuilt: 1970s (concrete); 2022–2024 (redevelopment)

Site notes
- Architect(s): J. C. Morell (1904 kiosk), Jackson Clements Burroughs (2024 pier)
- Governing body: Parks Victoria
- Owner: Parks Victoria
- Website: St Kilda Pier and Breakwater

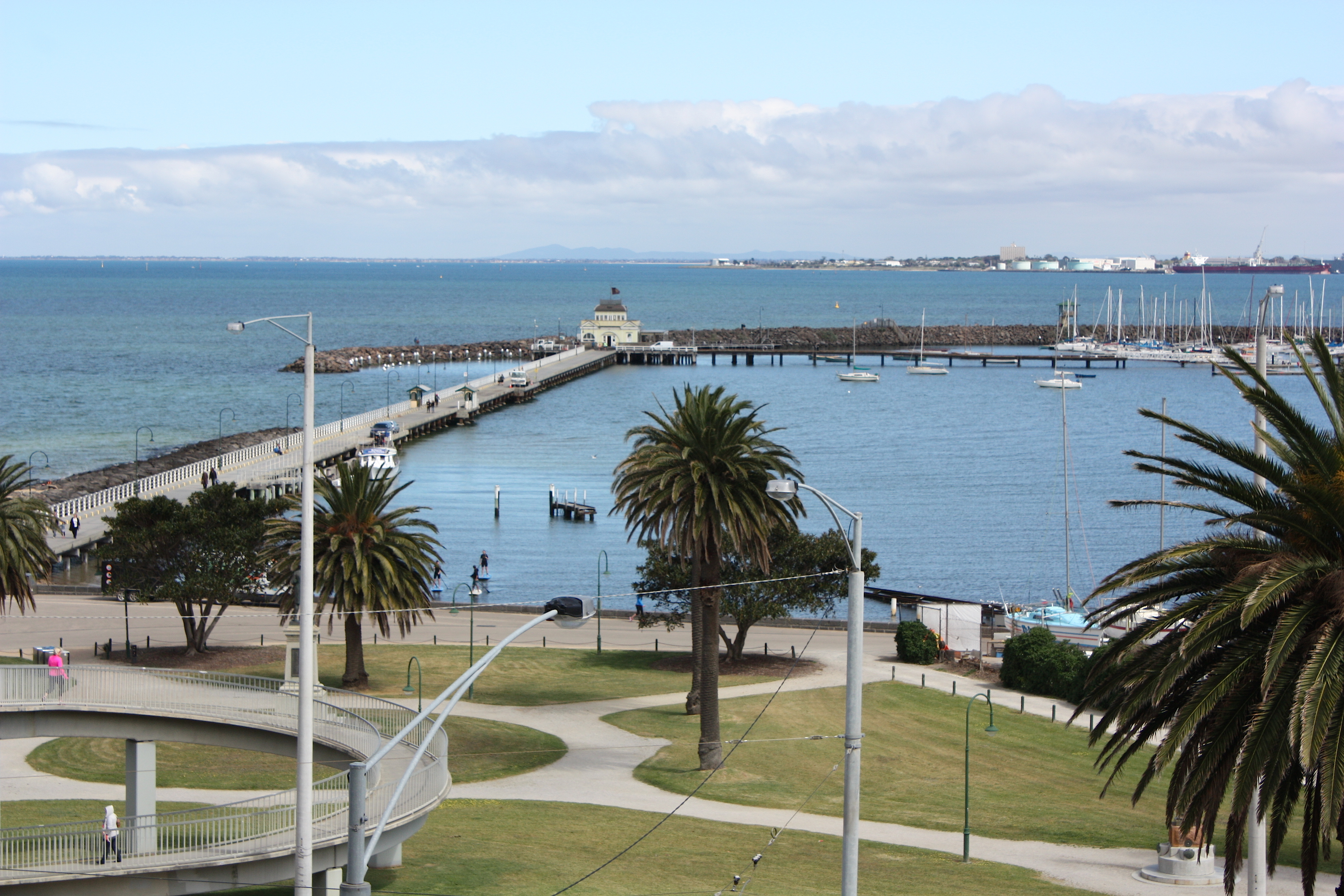
St Kilda Pier

The St Kilda Pier in St Kilda, Victoria, Australia, is a 300 metre long elevated pier connected to a 750 metre long stone breakwater in Port Phillip Bay and is home to a colony of Australian little penguins, the historic St Kilda Pavilion kiosk, and a 280 berth marina of the Royal Melbourne Yacht Squadron. The pier is a favourite destination for visitors to the St Kilda foreshore, with a walk to the end and back a popular activity, with views back to the CBD of Melbourne.

== Construction ==
It was first built in 1853 as a small private timber jetty by the St Kilda Pier and Jetty company, but destroyed the same year, and rebuilt by 1855 as a public pier. It was extended many times, until it became a 1944 ft pier with stone groins, a shelter at the beach end, a breakwater and an L-shaped extension sheltering the St Kilda Yacht Club by the 1880s. Moorings for the Port Phillip Bay excursion steamers were added in 1893, and the Pavilion was added in 1904. The pier became a favourite destination for promenading, fishing, excursions and small boat moorings for much of the 20th century, as St Kilda became Melbourne's entertainment district and most popular beach.

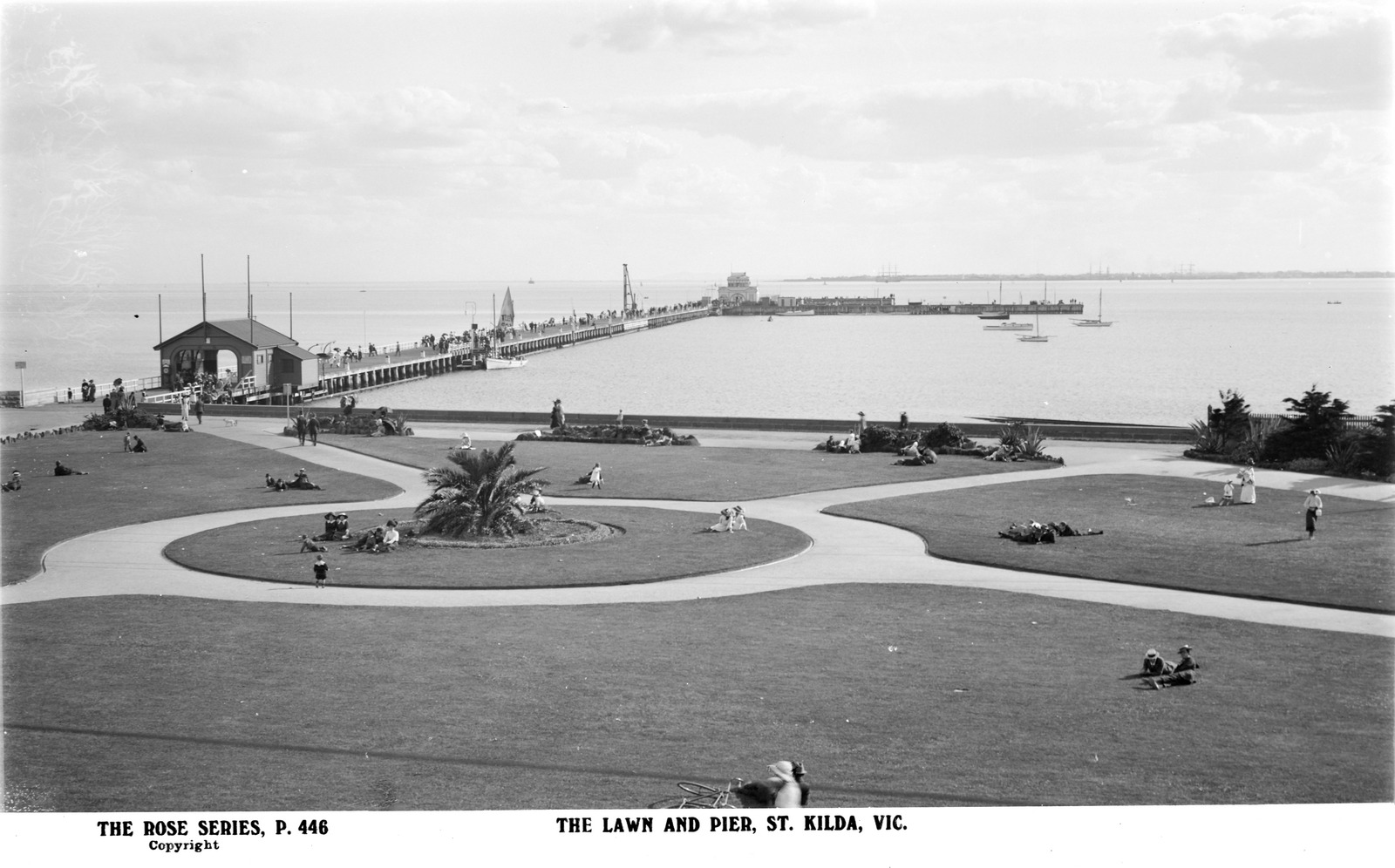
St kilda Pier c1915

The breakwater had been built in timber, and in 1955 was replaced with a rubble stone one. In the 1970s, the timber pier was replaced with a concrete one, and the breakwater extended.

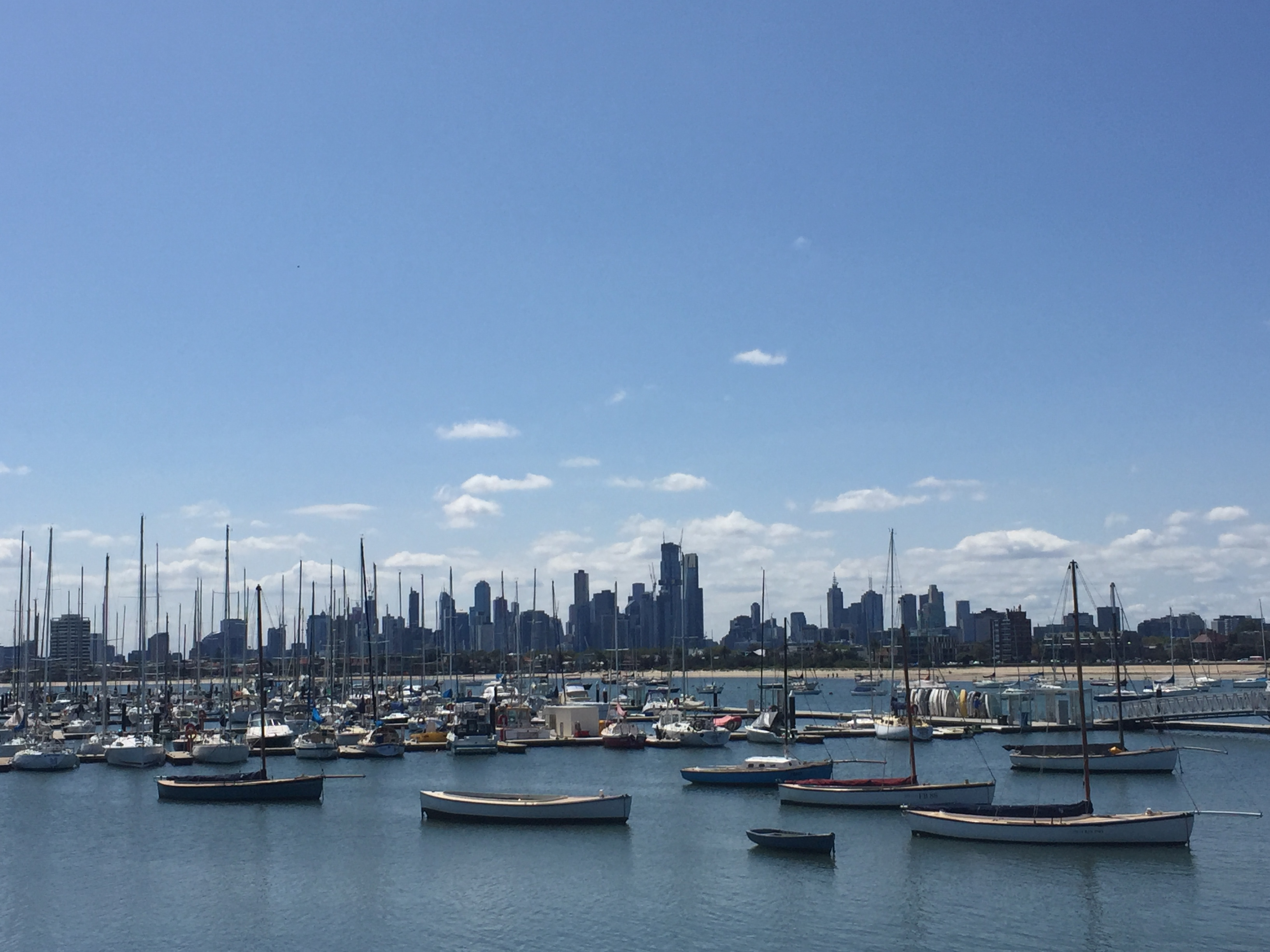
View from St Kilda Pier towards Melbourne CBD

=== 2022 redevelopment ===
In 2017, with the pier nearing the end of its design life, Parks Victoria, the owner of bayside infrastructure in Victoria, announced a plan to replace the current one, with two options designed by architects Jackson Clements Burroughs. The option of a new alignment angled to the south, with a curved end following the breakwater, was chosen. Construction commenced in 2022, and the new pier was officially opened on 7 November 2024.

At the 2026 Victorian Architecture Awards, presented by the Victorian Chapter of the Australian Institute of Architects, the redevelopment received the Victorian Architecture Medal, the Dimity Reed Melbourne Prize and the Joseph Reed Award for Urban Design.

== Penguin colony ==
Australian little penguins breeding amongst the rocks of the breakwater were first documented in 1974, with 100 altogether identified by 1989. They now number about 1200, and public viewing is a popular attraction.
