= Royal Geelong Yacht Club =

Yacht club in Geelong, Victoria, Australia

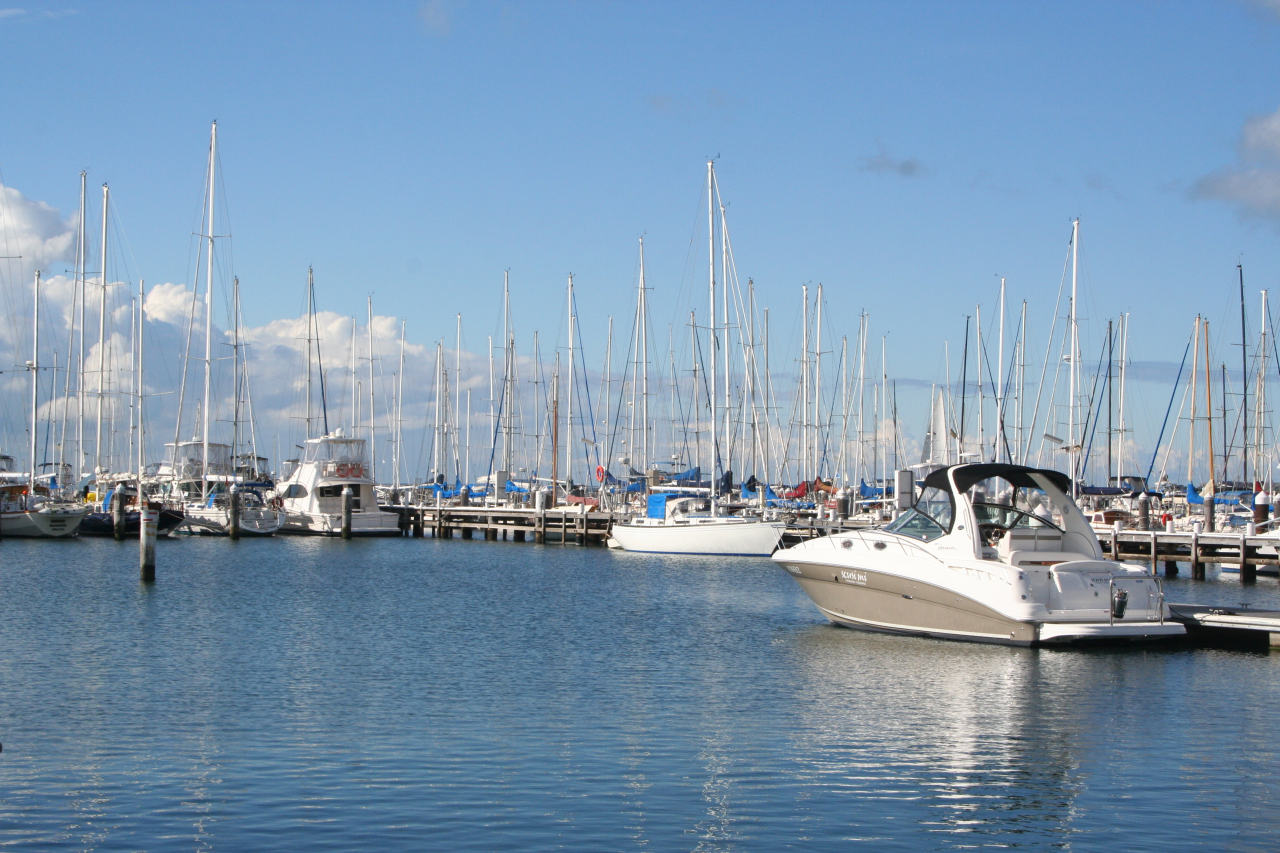
- Boats moored in the Bay City Marina
- Founded: 1859; 167 years ago
- Location: Geelong, Corio Bay, Victoria, Australia
- Website: rgyc.com.au

The Royal Geelong Yacht Club is a yacht club located in Geelong, on the Corio Bay in Victoria, Australia. The club was founded in 1859 and received its royal patronage in 1924.

The club is based on the shores of Corio Bay in the Geelong central business district. The 223-berth Bay City Marina was built in the 1980s in front of the clubhouse, and forms part of the Geelong Waterfront precinct.

The club is famous for hosting the Festival of Sails, the highly popular keelboat regatta in Australia, which attracts the best sailing crew. The regatta was first hosted by the yacht club in 1925; and, in 1986, 361 yachts participated.

== See also ==
- Ocean Racing Club of Victoria
