= McGrathNicol =

Australian consulting firm

- Formerly: McGrathNicol & Partners
- Type: Partnership
- Industry: Consulting
- Founded: July 2004
- Founders: Tony McGrath; Colin Nicol
- Headquarters: Melbourne, Australia
- Website: www.mcgrathnicol.com

McGrathNicol, formerly McGrathNicol & Partners, is an Australian consulting firm. Founded in 2004, it is most notable for its work as an administrator.

== History ==
McGrathNicol was established in July 2004 after the introduction of the Sarbanes-Oxley Act prevented KPMG from offering corporate recovery services to clients it audited. McGrathNicol & Partners commenced with 14 KPMG partners and 140 employees led by Tony McGrath and Colin Nicol.

== Notable engagements ==
- Airport Link, Brisbane
- Clive Peeters
- David Jones
- Dick Smith
- Great Southern Group
- Healthscope
- Henry Walker Eltin
- NewSat
- Nylex
- O'Connor Airlines
- RCR Tomlinson
- Sendle
- Top Ryde City
- Toys "R" Us Australia
