= St Kilda Sea Baths =

Place in St Kilda Beach, Victoria, Australia

Coordinates: 37.865421°S 144.971963°E

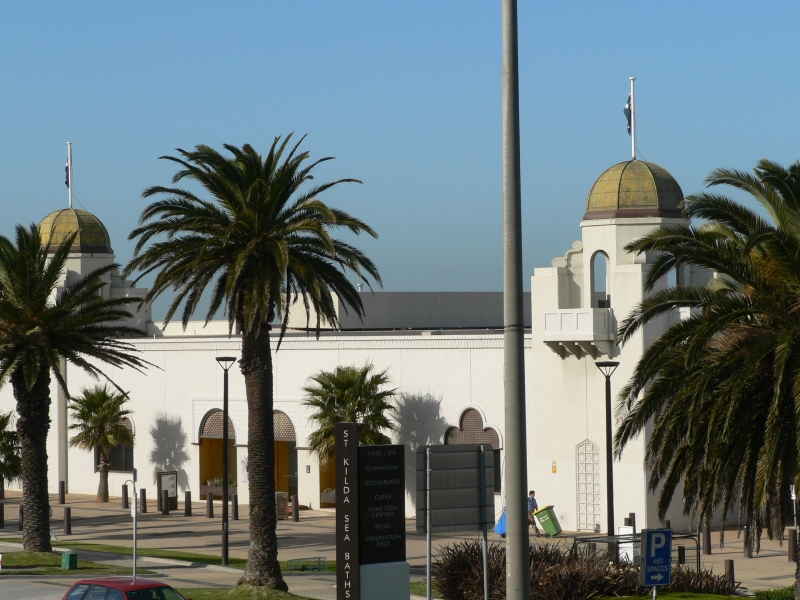
St Kilda Sea Baths

The St Kilda Sea Baths is a pool, spa, food and entertainment complex on St Kilda Beach, Victoria, Australia. Numerous 'sea bath' structures have come and gone on the St Kilda foreshore, the last built in a Spanish-Moorish style in 1931, which was demolished in the 1990s and replaced by the present structure, partly reconstructing the 1931 baths.

== History ==
Early lithograph (1864) of St Kilda main beach looking toward west beach and Port Melbourne.

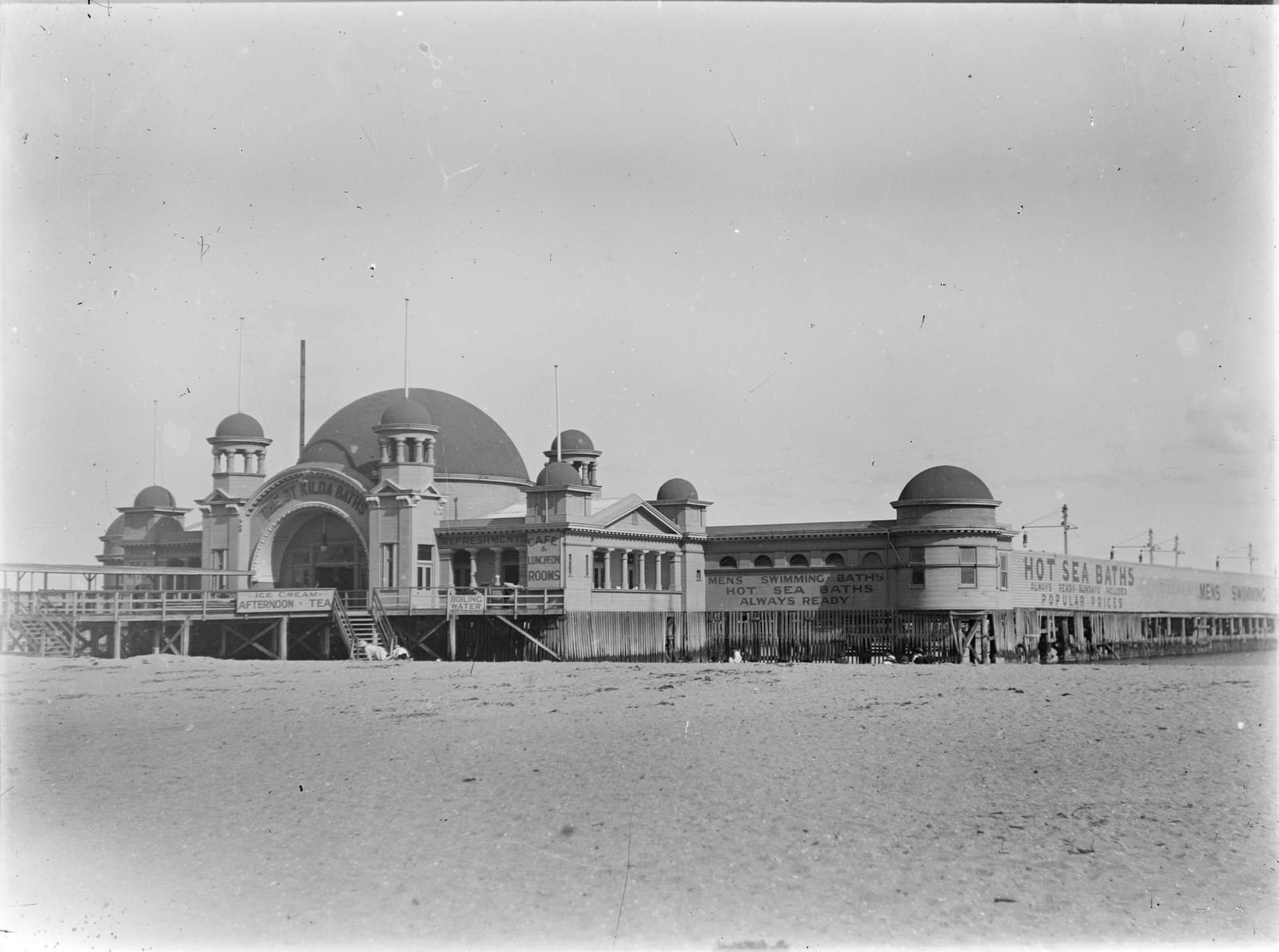
St Kilda Sea Baths c1910.

Until the 1850s in Victoria, 'open' sea bathing, that is in the open sea, was not generally considered acceptable. It was, however, permitted within large timber structures as protection from predatory marine life and away from public view. As the seaside suburb of Melbourne that was popular with the wealthy and the easiest to reach with the opening of the St Kilda railway line in 1857, the St Kilda beach area became a place of resort for the city. The first formal St Kilda bathing establishment was Captain Kenny's baths, opening in 1854 with a fenced enclosure and facilities in a beached ship some way out in the water, which provided separate sections for men and women. This was joined by purpose built structures, Hegarty's Railway Baths in 1858, and in 1860 by the Corporation Baths, the latter with an enclosure of 234m by 61m. The baths changed hands and names, and were regularly destroyed by storms, with up to four at one time operating off St Kilda Beach. In the men's sections, swimming was often naked, which was acceptable as the baths were fully enclosed from view.

In 1906 a new company replaced Hegarty's baths with a grand new structure simply known as the St Kilda Sea Baths. Designed by architect Nahum Barnet, it was the most prominent and exotic yet, featuring multiple turrets and domes, with the largest dome housing expanded facilities. This was at a time when St Kilda was fast becoming a mass market destination, and the baths featured in many photographs and postcards.

In 1917 open sea bathing was made legal, and by the mid-1920s, increasing numbers of people were bathing in the open sea in St Kilda, where they could also find attractions such as dance halls, cinemas and tea rooms. By 1928 'mixed' bathing, that is men and women mingling freely in the water, was increasingly popular, and St Kilda Council erected three changing pavilions along its foreshore: at West St Kilda, St Kilda Beach, and Elwood (demolished in 1971). By then only the domed sea baths was still operating, and it was destroyed by fire on 19 November 1925. Eventually the City of St Kilda decided to build a grand new structure, with adjoining men's and women's bath, and a range of facilities including a nightclub in the head building on the foreshore, designed by the city's engineering department in an exotic style including Moorish domes and Spanish arches, which opened in 1931. The larger men's enclosure was a timber structure, while the women's was constructed of reinforced concrete.

The beach changing pavilions however proved more popular than the sea baths, with crowds flocking to beach in the summer months through the 20s and 30s. In the 1940s, artist Sidney Nolan painted a series of images of bathers on a platform in the sea, which are thought to depict the St Kilda Sea Baths. There are a few photos showing that many men still swam naked within the baths in the 1930s.

By the 1950s, the timber men's enclosure had deteriorated, and was demolished, with the women's following in the early 1980s. The main building with its 'hot sea baths' and nightclub remained in operation in a suburb that had declined in reputation, but was still a popular resort. In 1993 the baths were finally closed pending a redevelopment. Council sought various partners and designs amid controversy, with the current building finally decided, and completed in c2000.

Due to its condition, the remains of the building were completely demolished, with only the domes retained, placed on a reconstruction of the twin-domed Moorish-style section, and a plainer section adjacent occupying the original footprint to the north. The complex includes numerous restaurants on two levels, function rooms, a courtyard between the Moorish domes, a health club, and a 25m public swimming pool, Australia's only indoor heated sea-water pool.

In 2017 a new controversy erupted when the lessee of the function rooms and the rooftop proposed to add a larger rooftop pavilion.

== Land ownership ==
The land on which the Sea Baths were built has remained Crown Land, managed by the Department of Lands and its successors (in 2018 this is the Department of Environment, Land, Water and Planning), in consultation with the local Council, currently the City of Port Phillip. Council has not always agreed with the decisions of the department. The complex is leased to an operator, who sub-lets the various tenancies. The pool, gym and spa have been leased since 2001 by South Pacific Health Clubs.
