= Royal Melbourne Yacht Squadron =

Yacht club in Melbourne, Australia

Coordinates: 37°51′48″S 144°58′18″E

- Pier Street entrance to the clubhouse, 2015

- Burgee

- Ensign
- Short name: RMYS
- Founded: 1876; 150 years ago (as St Kilda Sailing Club)
- Location: St Kilda Beach, Port Phillip Bay, Melbourne, Victoria, Australia
- Commodore: Paul D’Arcy
- Website: www.rmys.com.au

The Royal Melbourne Yacht Squadron is a yacht club located at St Kilda Beach, on the shores of Port Phillip Bay, in the eastern suburbs of Melbourne, Victoria, Australia. The squadron was founded in 1876 and it has occupied its grounds on Pier Road in the suburb of St. Kilda since prior to incorporation.

== History ==
Sailing began on the approximate site of the current Royal Melbourne Yacht Squadron club house in the 1870s. The St Kilda Sailing Club was incorporated in 1876. It changed its name to St Kilda Yacht Club in 1884. After the grant of a royal warrant on 9 April 1924, the name of the club was again changed to Royal St Kilda Yacht Club. The Royal St Kilda Yacht Club amalgamated with the St Kilda 14-Foot Sailing Club in June 1961 and adopted the current name "Royal Melbourne Yacht Squadron". The Squadron registered as a company limited by guarantee under the National Companies Code on 21 February 1983. The squadron was the control centre for the 1956 Melbourne Olympic Games yachting events.

== Purpose ==
The squadron has been promoting the sport of sailing and providing sailing facilities to members since the 1870s.

Sailing is mostly in keel boats with some off the beach and junior sailing available. The club organises races on Port Phillip throughout the year on Saturdays, Wednesdays and some Sundays.

The squadron has a floating marina in St. Kilda Harbour, constructed in 2014, with about 250 pens. The squadron also manages approximately 115 swing moorings located in St. Kilda Harbour.

== Weather station ==
A Bureau of Meteorology weather station, which is limited to wind speed only, is located on top of the club house.

== See also ==
- Ocean Racing Club of Victoria
