= Clive Peeters =

Australian retailer

- Industry: Retailing
- Founded: 1973
- Defunct: 2011
- Fate: Voluntary Administration then acquisition in 2010. Retired in 2011, most stores converted to Harvey Norman or Joyce Mayne stores, remaining stores closed down.
- Successor: Harvey Norman
- Headquarters: Bayswater North, Victoria, Australia
- Number of locations: 25 stores (2011); Clive Peeters: 17; Rick Hart: 8
- Area served: Melbourne, Bendigo, South East Queensland, Mackay, Perth, Broome
- Products: Electrical, Whitegoods
- Website: www.clivepeeters.com.au

Clive Peeters was an Australian electrical, computers, kitchens and whitegoods retailer with stores in Victoria, Queensland, New South Wales and Tasmania. Under the original owners, the first stores opened in Melbourne in 1973 and Brisbane in 2001.

In 2005, Clive Peeters bought the Rick Hart chain of retail stores in Western Australia, however the stores continue to trade under the Rick Hart name. Clive Peeters stores carried more than 140 brands and over 20,000 individual models.

Certain locations were acquired by Harvey Norman (The Derni Group) in July 2010, who will continue to operate both retailers independent of their other major retail brands, Harvey Norman, Joyce Mayne and Domayne.

== Internal fraud ==
In 2009 it was discovered that the Clive Peeters payroll manager, Sonya Denise Causer, had defrauded the company by falsely inflating the company payroll expense and then using her company online banking access to transfer the difference between the actual and reported expense to bank accounts she controlled. Causer had stolen over A$20 million during the period November 2007 to June 2009 and used the money to purchase 43 properties and 3 cars. The company took civil action to have Causers' assets transferred to Clive Peeters.

== Administration ==
Clive Peeters shares ceased trading in the Australian Securities Exchange on 19 May 2010, after the company brought in McGrathNicol as voluntary administrators to try and sell off the business.

== New management ==
Nik Papa was appointed General Manager in July 2010. Papa had previously been a Harvey Norman franchisee.

On 11 August 2011, Harvey Norman Executive Chairman Gerry Harvey announced that the Clive Peeters brand was "stuffed" and tainted beyond repair, admitting that it was a bad business decision for Harvey Norman to take over Clive Peeters in the first place. As a result, 13 Clive Peeters stores and 5 Rick Hart stores will be converted to Harvey Norman stores (with the exception of two stores, which will be converted to Joyce Mayne stores), with the remaining four Clive Peeters stores and three Rick Hart stores being closed down and sold off, because of proximity to existing Harvey Norman stores in those areas.

== Gallery ==
A Clive Peeters store

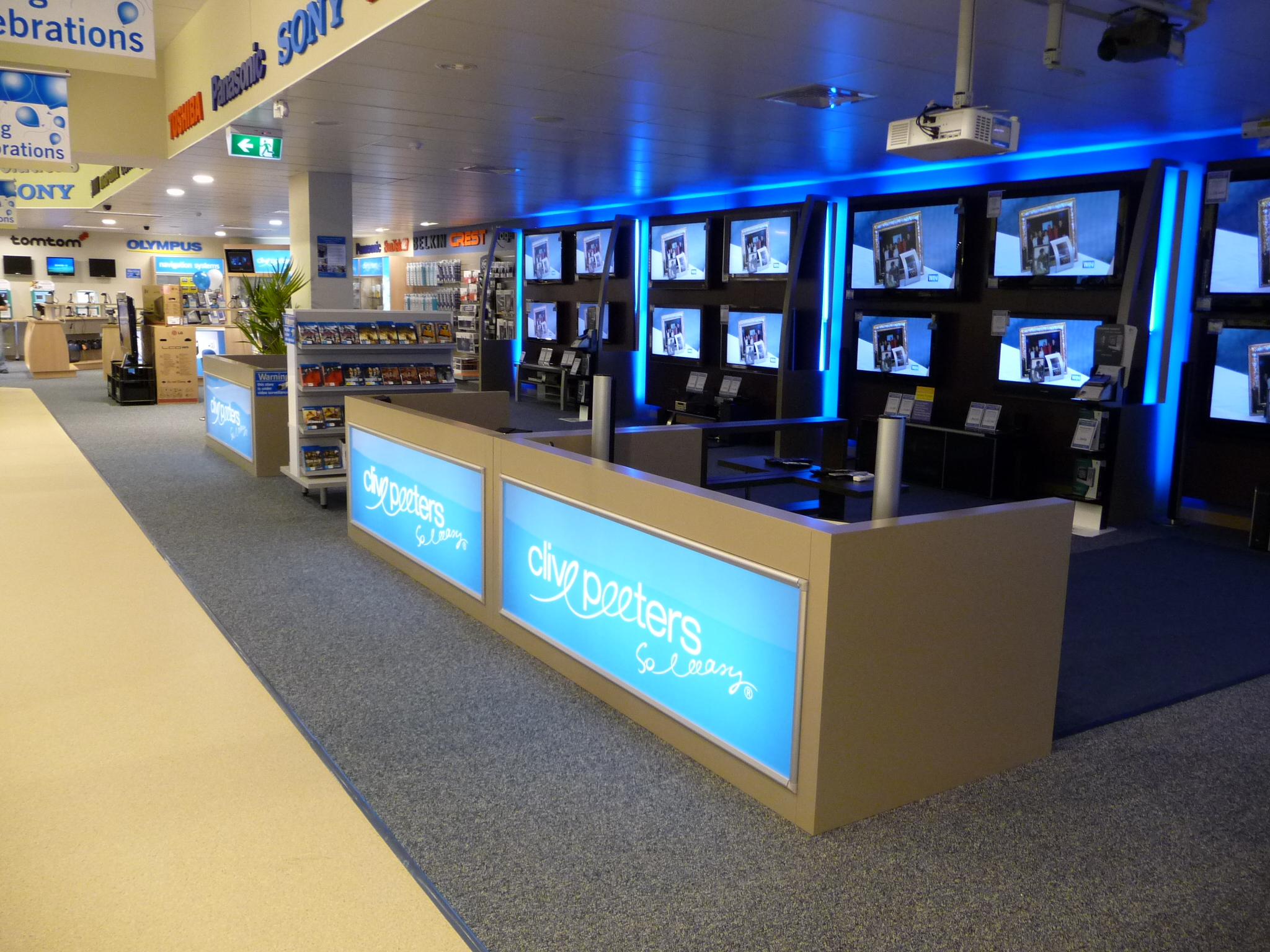
Audio Visual

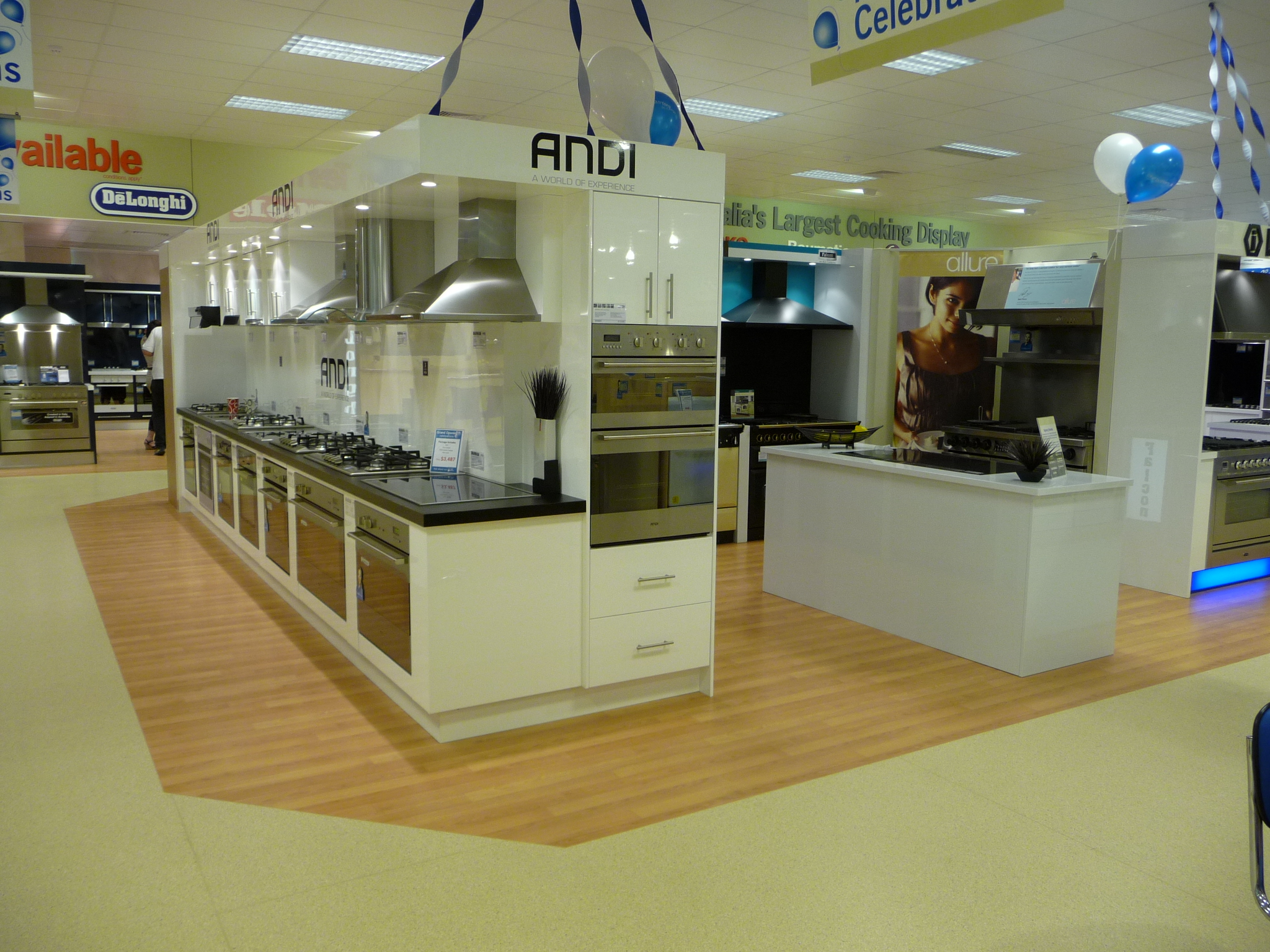
Kitchen appliances

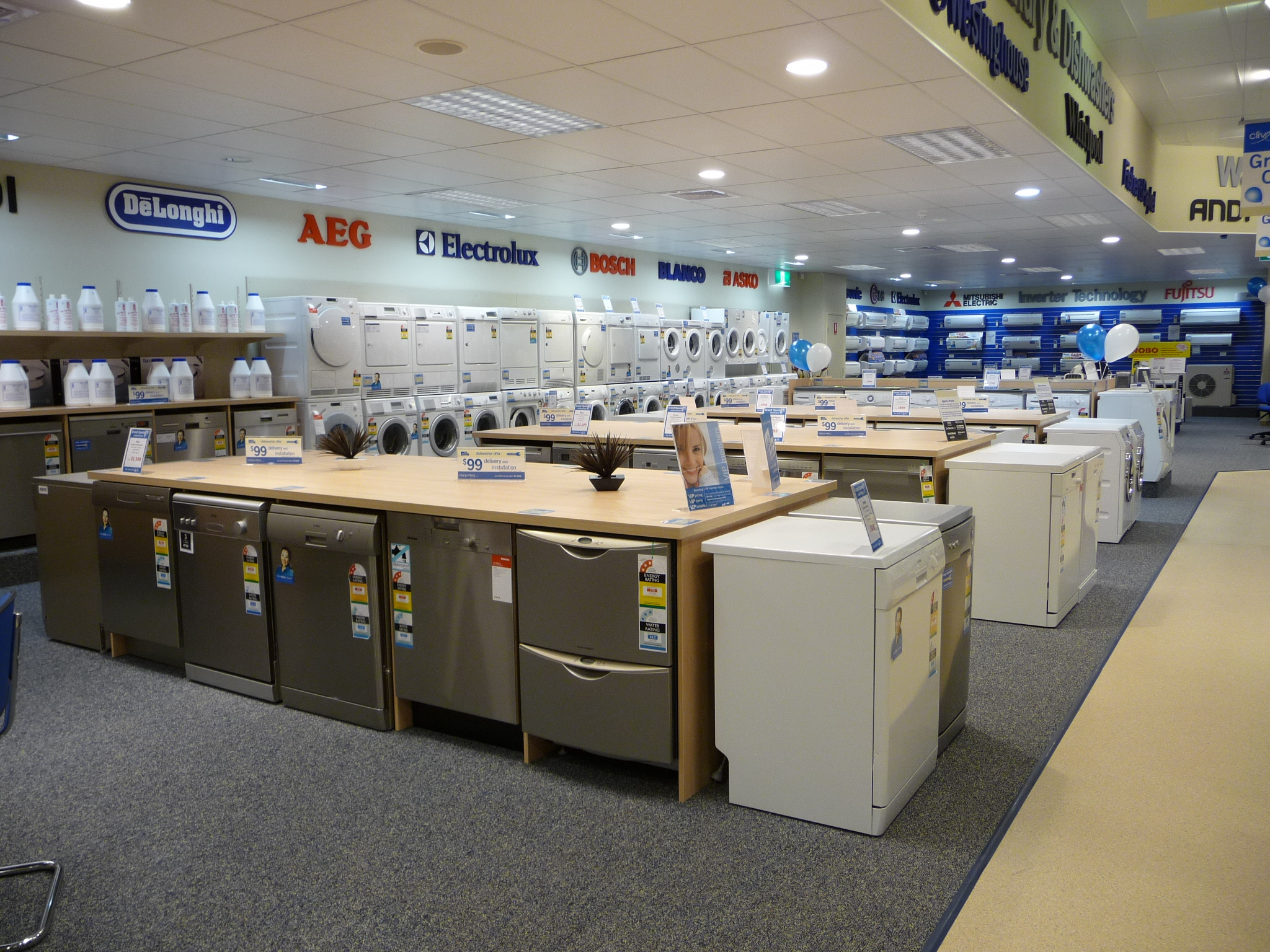
Whitegoods
