= St Kilda Pavilion =

Kiosk in Victoria, Australia

Coordinates: 37°51′53″S 144°57′57″E

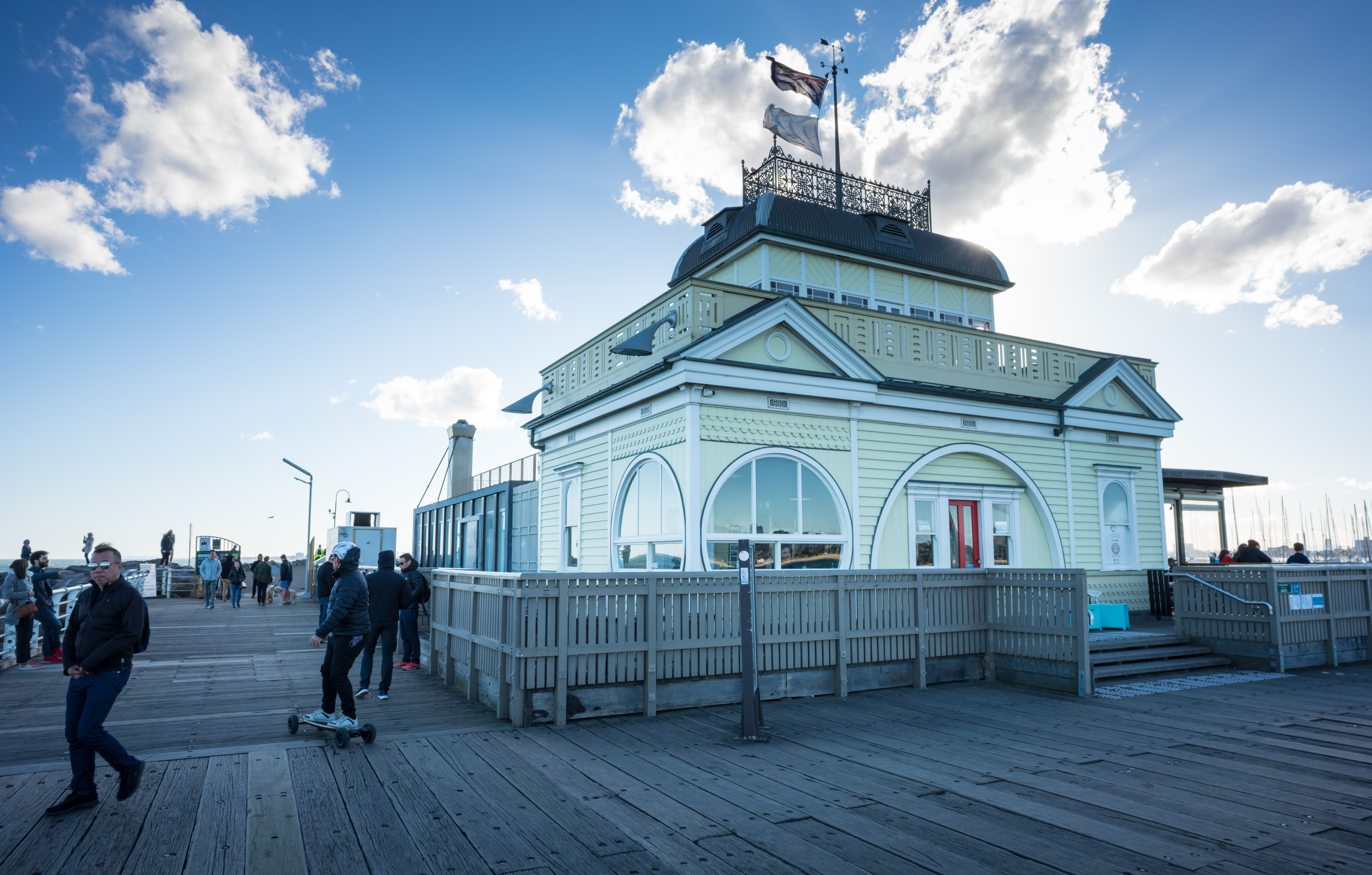
The St Kilda Pavilion

The St Kilda Pavilion is a historic kiosk located at the end of St Kilda Pier, in St Kilda, Victoria, Australia. Though it is a 2004 reconstruction, it is listed on the Victorian Heritage Register.

== History ==
The first St Kilda pier was built in 1853 and was extended a number of times up to 1900 as St Kilda grew in popularity as a seaside destination. A kiosk at the far end was proposed and then operated by Francis Parer, from a family of restaurateurs. It was designed by James Charles Morell of the Victorian Public Works Department, and built in 1904 by John W. Douglas. Until the 1930s, the structure was widely known as Parer's Pavilion; however, its actual name was the Austral Refreshment Rooms. Noble and Ivy Kerby acquired the lease from the Victorian Government in 1939, and it became known as Kerby's Kiosk. Their son Colin had worked at the kiosk since 1934, and took it over after his father died in 1959, living upstairs with his family, until he retired in 1987 after which various alterations were reversed, and the pavilion was restored. The kiosk was then leased Joe Sillitoe, then Carmel Grant.

On 11 September 2003 the kiosk was destroyed in an arson attack. After massive public support to rebuild the kiosk and the support of Premier Steve Bracks, it was reconstructed to the original 1903 plans, utilising some of the salvaged components, such as the cast iron roof, decorative cresting and weather vane. An additional structure, expanding the capacity was erected directly behind the kiosk and is obscured by the pavilion when viewed from the pier. The kiosk reopened in March 2006, leased to Peter Tzambazis for 16 years.

The pier and the kiosk is owned and managed by Parks Victoria.

== Gallery ==
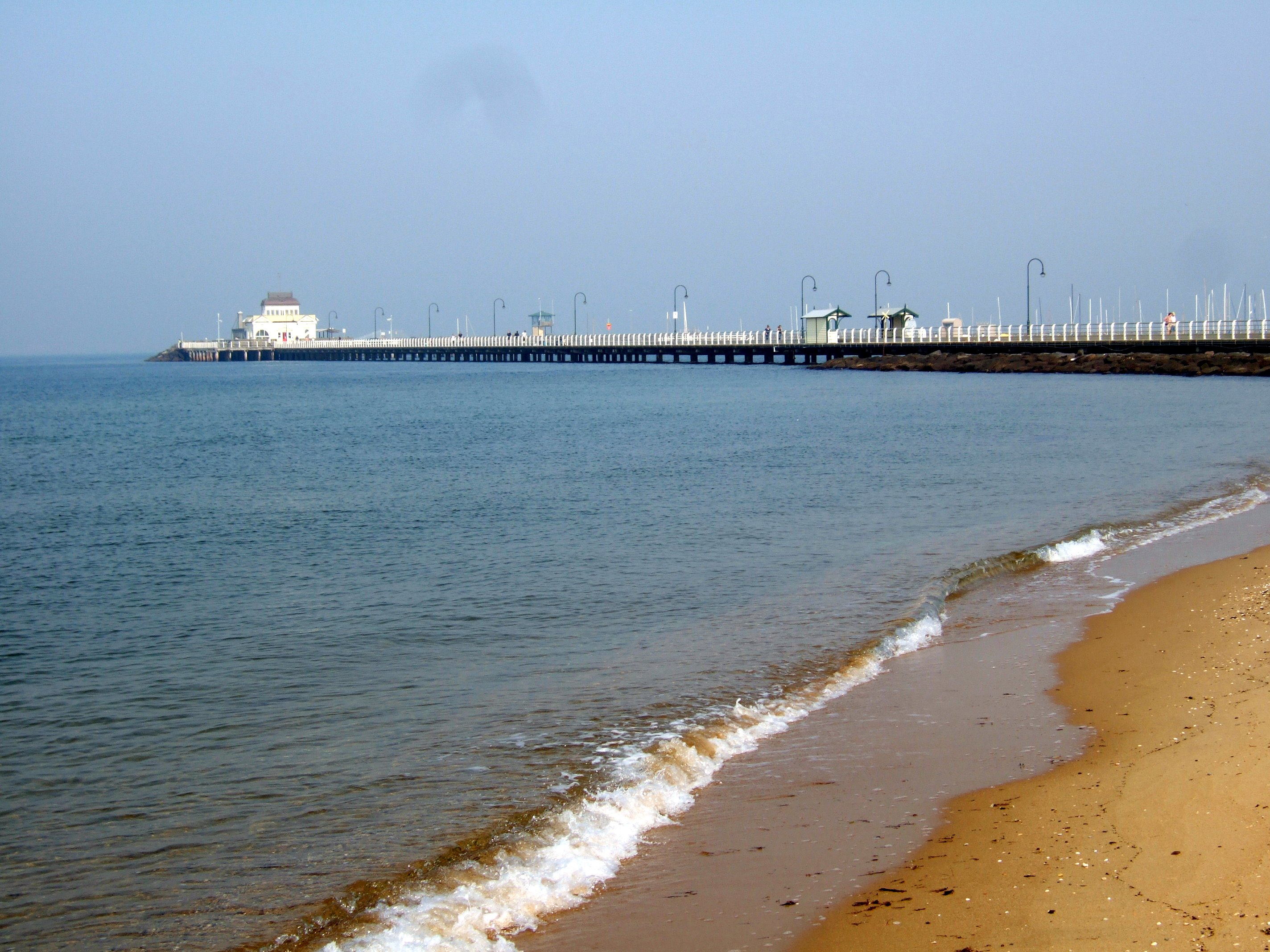

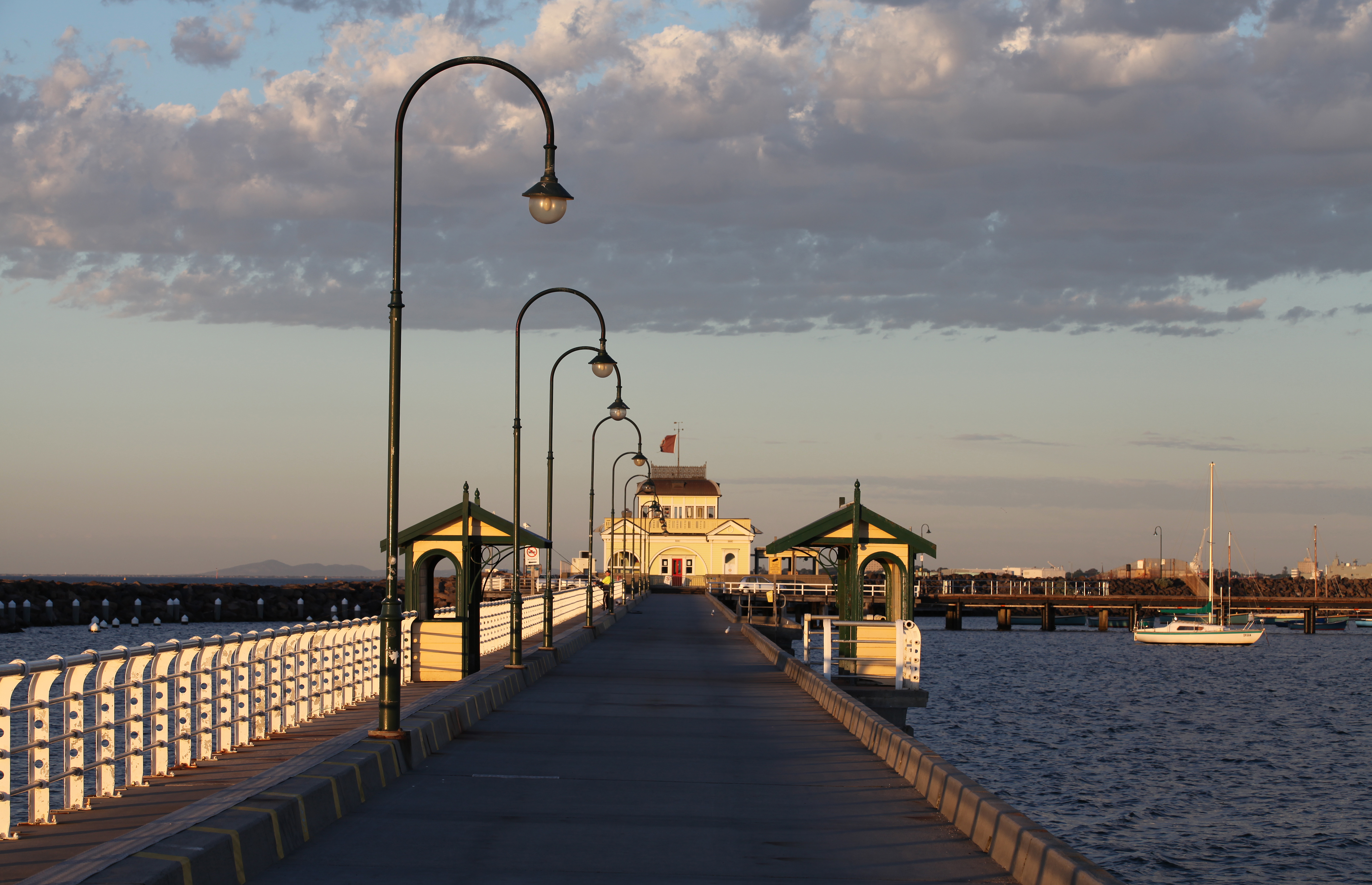
St. Kilda Pier Kiosk

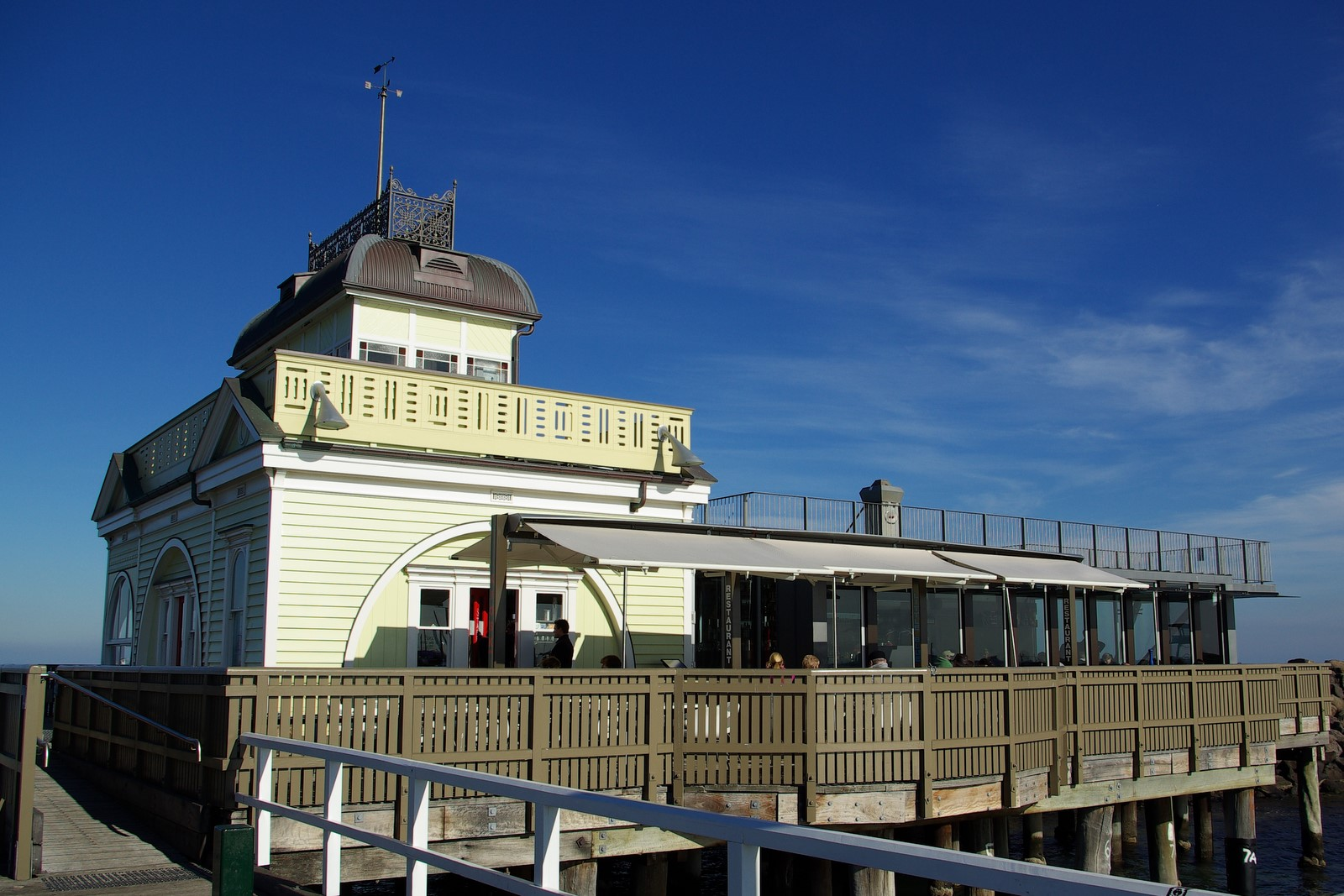
