= Royal Yacht Club of Tasmania =

Yachting club in Tasmania, Australia

Coordinates: 42°53′52″S 147°19′56.93″E

- Burgee

- Ensign
- Short name: RYCT
- Founded: 1880
- Location: Sandy Bay, Tasmania, Australia
- Website: Royal Yacht Club of Tasmania

The Royal Yacht Club of Tasmania (RYCT) is the largest yacht club in the Australian state of Tasmania. It is known for its prominent role in the Tasmanian sailing community and for being the finishing point of the annual Sydney to Hobart Yacht Race. The club offers a variety of facilities including a 120-berth marina, boat maintenance, and social spaces.

== History ==
Founded in 1880 as the Derwent Sailing Boat Club, the RYCT has been a key part of the Tasmanian sailing community for over a century. In 1910, the club was granted royal patronage by King Edward VII, officially becoming the Royal Yacht Club of Tasmania. Over the decades, the RYCT has played a central role in hosting local, national, and international sailing events, including the Sydney to Hobart Yacht Race.

== Sydney to Hobart ==
Since 1945, the RYCT has served as the finishing club for the Sydney to Hobart Yacht Race, one of the most renowned offshore yacht races in the world. Competitors travel 628 nautical miles from Sydney to Hobart, and the race ends at the RYCT’s marina on the Derwent River. The club coordinates the finish and manages the celebrations, including the presentation of the Tattersall's Cup to the overall winner.

In 2008, the club hosted the launch of a special book on the race, which was unveiled by the Premier of Tasmania, marking the club's long-standing association with the event.

== Facilities ==
The RYCT’s modern marina provides 120 berths for local and visiting yachts, with access to power, water, fuel, and boat maintenance services. The club’s clubhouse includes dining and function rooms, providing space for social gatherings and events. The marina map assists sailors with berthing arrangements and available services.

The club has also embarked on projects such as the "Off the Beach" facility, which supports sailing development programs and offers improved amenities for dinghy sailors.

== Notable Events and Figures ==
The RYCT regularly hosts significant sailing events, including the annual Maria Island Race and various national championships. The club is also involved in Tasmania's Opening Day of the Sailing Season, which sees large fleets of yachts gather on the River Derwent for a day of celebrations.

Marion Cooper became the first female life member of the RYCT in 2009, a milestone for gender representation in the club’s history.

The club has also been involved in nurturing competitive sailors, such as Team Salter, who won the Women's Keelboat Regatta.

== Sailing Activities ==
The Royal Yacht Club of Tasmania offers a variety of racing and cruising programs, catering to sailors of all levels. The club runs regular regattas and supports keelboat and dinghy racing. In addition to competitive sailing, the RYCT also promotes youth sailing development and runs training courses for new and experienced sailors.

== See also ==
- Sydney to Hobart Yacht Race
- Derwent Sailing Squadron, neighbouring club
- Sport in Tasmania

== Sources ==
- Geeves, M.D. (1980), SAILING ON... A History of The Royal Yacht Club of Tasmania, Centenary Book Committee, ISBN 0959621415
