= Derwent Sailing Squadron =

Yacht club in Hobart, Tasmania

Coordinates: 42°53′56.53″S 147°19′54.8″E

- Short name: DSS
- Founded: 1906
- Location: Sandy Bay, Hobart, Australia
- Website: Derwent Sailing Squadron

The Derwent Sailing Squadron (DSS) is a yacht club located in Sandy Bay, Hobart, Australia, on the western shore of the River Derwent. Founded in 1906, the club is involved in a range of sailing activities and events, contributing to Tasmania's sailing community.

== History ==
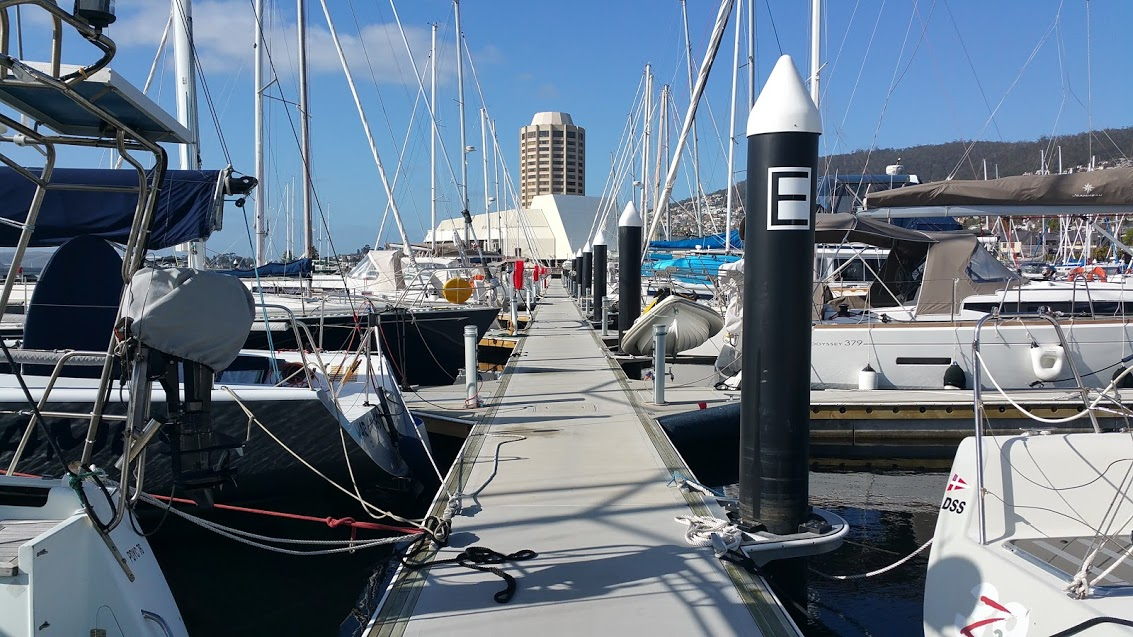
Berthed yachts, 2016

The Derwent Sailing Squadron was founded in 1906 as the "Motor Yacht Club of Tasmania" before changing its name in the 1920s to reflect its focus on sailing. Since 1958, the club has been based in Sandy Bay, providing facilities for its members and supporting local sailing activities.

== Sailing activities and programmes ==
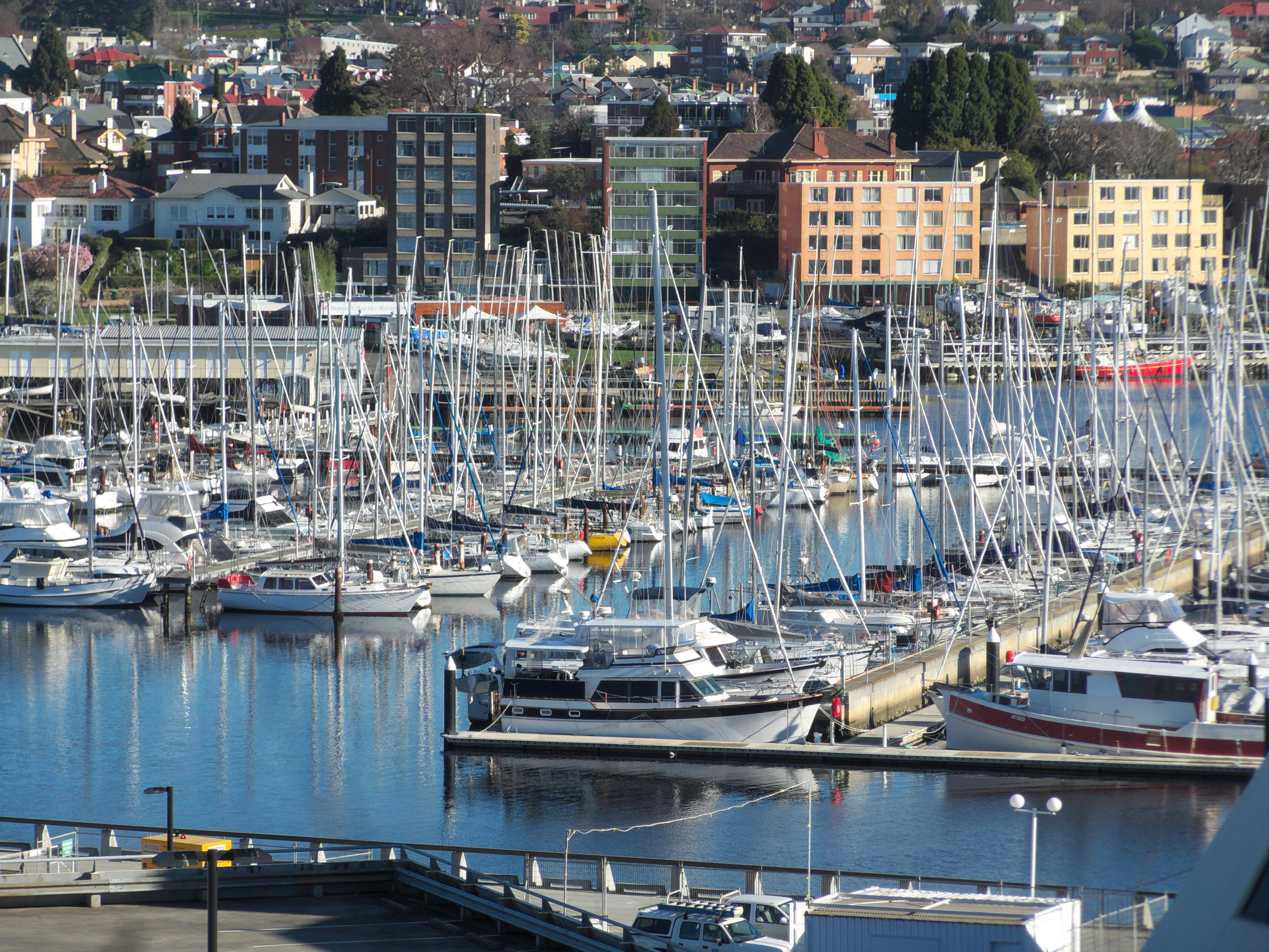
DSS marina, 2018

The Derwent Sailing Squadron organises a variety of sailing activities, including weekly races on the River Derwent. The club also plays a role in larger events, such as the finish of the Sydney to Hobart Yacht Race. The club offers youth training programs in dinghy and keelboat sailing, fostering skills for future competitive sailors.

The club was recognised in the 2024 Australian Sailing Awards, with several members and programs shortlisted as finalists.

== Leadership and representation ==
In 2021, Team Salter from the Derwent Sailing Squadron won the Women's Keelboat Championship in Melbourne. Long-standing member Heather McCallum was appointed to the Australian Sailing Board in 2024.

== Facilities ==
The Derwent Sailing Squadron operates a marina with 230 berths for local and visiting yachts. The marina offers power, water, and maintenance services. The clubhouse includes dining facilities and function rooms.

== Events ==
The club is involved in the organisation of various state, national, and international sailing events, including the finish of the Sydney to Hobart Yacht Race. Other events include championships for dinghy and keelboat classes.

== See also ==
- Sydney to Hobart Yacht Race
- Royal Yacht Club of Tasmania, neighbouring club
- Bellerive Yacht Club
- List of yacht clubs

== Sources ==
- Kerrison, A. Rex. (Allen Rex), 1938-; Johnson, Richard A (2006), Ebbs and flows : a short history of the Derwent Sailing Squadron, 1906-2006 / [A. Rex Kerrison & Richard A. Johnson], Derwent Sailing Squadron, ISBN 0646456547 – via National Library of Australia
