= Bellerive Yacht Club =

Yacht club in Tasmania, Australia

- Founded: 1926
- Based in: Bellerive, Tasmania
- Website: byc.org.au

The Bellerive Yacht Club is a yacht club in the Australian state of Tasmania. It was established in 1926 to cater for a growing population in the city of Clarence and encourage sailing activities amongst the population there. It has since grown to over 800 members with an annual turnover of over A$1 million.

The club sports a range of facilities, from a 120-berth marina to on-site maintenance facilities, a shipyard and crane, re-rigging areas, refueling and storage facilities, temporary moorings, and a clubhouse containing two bars, a bistro restaurant, an outdoor barbecue area, and a function centre.

The club organises a sailing calendar throughout the year which includes competitive and social events, and is also responsible for organising the annual Bellerive Regatta. The club has a friendly sporting rivalry with their western shore counterparts. The club also organises social activities for its members.
