= Ocean Racing Club of Victoria =

Ocean Racing Club of Victoria (ORCV)
- Legal status: active
- Purpose: advocate and public voice, educator and network for Recreational boating, and competitive sailors, coaches, volunteers and events
- Location: Victoria (Australia) Australia
- Official language: English,
- Website: www.orcv.org.au

The Ocean Racing Club of Victoria Inc. (ORCV) conducts ocean/offshore and bay yacht races and events in Victoria, Australia.

== History ==
The Ocean Racing Club of Victoria Inc. was formed as the Cruising Yacht Club of Victoria by founding members Bill Wakefield, Fred Cook and Frank Bennell in 1949, so that ocean races in Victorian waters could be efficiently developed and run by an organisation focused exclusively on the needs of ocean racers. It was renamed the Ocean Racing Club of Victoria Inc. in 1972 and incorporated in 1986. The ORCV is an Organising Authority of Category 1, 2 and 3 ocean races and a Yachting Australia Training Centre (YATC) with five Yachting Australia accredited Yachtmaster Offshore and Safety & Sea Survival Course Instructors.

In 2018, the ORCV introduced the "Four + Autohelm" format to its nautic races.

== Description ==
The Ocean Racing Club of Victoria is a member club of the Australian Sailing (formally Yachting Australia) and the International Sailing Federation (ISAF). Membership is drawn from all of the major keel boat yacht clubs in Victoria, but does not compete with other yacht clubs by operating a clubhouse or marina facility.

All ORCV training activities specifically relate to ocean sailing and racing, particularly where there may be barriers to entering this domain. They are designed to provide supplementary training, which complements other available sailing training from commercial training organisations.

== Annual events ==
The ORCV conduct the following Ocean and Bay yacht races and events:

Name	Type	When	Race Category	Distance nautical miles	Year first conducted
Melbourne to Stanley or Melbourne to Portland	Ocean Yacht Race	November	2	152 or 163	
Latitude Ocean	Ocean Yacht Race or Cruising event	November	3	Handicap dependent	
Latitude Pursuit	Bay Yacht Race or Cruising event	November	6	34	
Cock of the Bay (previously known as Boxing Day Dash)	Bay Yacht Race	December	6	34	
Melbourne to Hobart Westcoaster blue-water classic	Ocean Yacht Race	December	2	435	1972
Melbourne to Hobart Eastcoaster blue-water classic	Ocean Yacht Race	December	2	455	2007
Rudder Cup Melbourne to Launceston blue-water classic or Rudder Cup Melbourne to Devonport blue-water classic	Ocean Yacht Race	December	2	198 or 195	1907
Melbourne to Grassy, King Island	Ocean Yacht Race	March	2	115	1972
Melbourne to Port Fairy	Ocean Yacht Race	March	2	135	
Double-Handed	Bay Yacht Race	May	6	24	
Melbourne to Apollo Bay	Ocean Yacht Race	May	6	52	
Winter Series	Bay Yacht Races Series	June to August	6		
Melbourne to Geelong	Bay Yacht Race	September	6	34 to 58	
Women Skipper & Navigators	Bay Yacht Race	September	6	33	2008

International events

Name	Type	When	Race Category	Distance nautical miles	Year first conducted
Melbourne to Vanuatu	International Ocean Yacht Race	Every 4 years	1	1,885	2006
Osaka Cup Melbourne to Osaka Double-Handed	International Ocean Yacht Race	Every 4 years	1	5,500	1987
