= Fitzroy Street, Melbourne =

Road in Melbourne, Victoria

Fitzroy Street Victoria
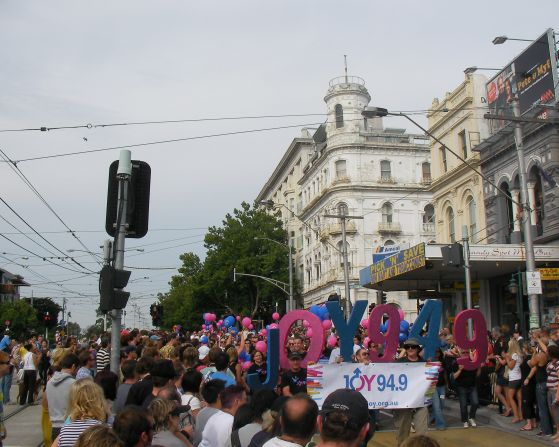
- Looking east up Fitzroy Street to the corner of Grey Street, during the Midsumma Pride March in 2008
- Coordinates: 37.862664°S 144.972581°E (West end); 37.856640°S 144.982553°E (East end)

General information
- Type: Street
- Length: 1.1 km (0.7 mi)

Major junctions
- West end: The Esplanade; St Kilda, Melbourne
- Acland Street; Canterbury Road; Grey Street; Lakeside Drive
- East end: St Kilda Road; Punt Road; St Kilda, Melbourne

Location(s)
- LGA(s): City of Port Phillip

Fitzroy Street is the major thoroughfare of the beachside Melbourne suburb of St Kilda. Its fortunes have risen and fallen along with that of St Kilda itself, from wealthy residential district to a popular working and middle class beachside entertainment district, to cheap and seedy, and popular again in the late 20th century. In recent years Fitzroy Street itself has gone from a popular restaurant strip to the situation in 2017 where only a few restaurants remain amongst kebab shops and convenience stores catering the backpackers and many empty shopfronts. It is named after Charles Augustus FitzRoy, Governor of New South Wales (which included the area of Victoria) in 1842 when St Kilda was first subdivided.

== Route ==
Fitzroy Street is a wide street running generally downhill from St Kilda Junction to the beach foreshore, the most direct road route from the Melbourne central business district to the popular bay beach. It is an unusually wide street, with wide footpaths and space for a separate tram line right of way, and the two sides have quite different characters. It is sometimes closed to traffic for major events such as the St Kilda Festival, the Melbourne Marathon and the Midsumma Pride March.

The eastern section of the street from St Kilda Junction to Grey Street comprises medium rise apartment buildings on the south side overlooking Albert Park and Lake and the Junction Oval on the north. The corner of Grey Street is dominated by The George, originally a large hotel, now apartments and hospitality spaces.

From Grey Street to The Esplanade, the south side is entirely lined with shops, many with apartments or hotels above. Leo's Spaghetti Bar is the most well known eatery, an early Italian restaurant and gelateria which was opened during the 1956 Summer Olympics.

Opposite The George is the former St Kilda railway station, opened in 1857, converted to retail and other uses when the train line was converted to become part of route 96 in 1987, which continues into Fitzroy Street, where it joins route 16.

Tram routes 16 and 96 run down the street.

== History ==
Like St Kilda as a whole, Fitzroy Street in the middle to late 19th century was mainly a wealthy residential address, lined with grand houses, terraces and hotels. During the interwar years, the mansions were converted to flats or private hotels, and shops built in their front gardens, while others were replaced by flats with shops on the ground floor. The prominent Art Deco Prince of Wales Hotel replaced a Victorian era hotel of the same name on the corner of Acland Street in 1937. In the mid 20th century this development trend was continued, resulting in a continuous row of shops.

From the 1960s to the 1980s, Fitzroy Street became the public face of the transformation of St Kilda from popular seaside entertainment and apartment living to red light district and cheap flats. The street featured cheap late night eateries, prostitution, and drag cabaret shows, as well as punk rock and alternative music venues, such as the Crystal Ballroom and the Prince of Wales Hotel. The suburb and the street, and particularly the Prince of Wales Hotel, became a centre of LGBT culture in Melbourne in the 1980s, an association that continues as the location of the Midsumma Festival since 1995, and in 2017 with the announcement that the Victorian Pride Centre would be located there.

In March 2017, the Gatwick Private Hotel was purchased by the Nine Network for filming of the 2018 season of The Block.

The passing of the Road Management Act 2004 granted the responsibility of overall management and development of Victoria's major arterial roads to VicRoads: in 2013, VicRoads re-declared the road as Fitzroy Street (Arterial #5932), beginning at Canterbury Road and ending at Nepean Highway through St Kilda; the remainder of the street west to The Esplanade remains undeclared.

== Gallery ==
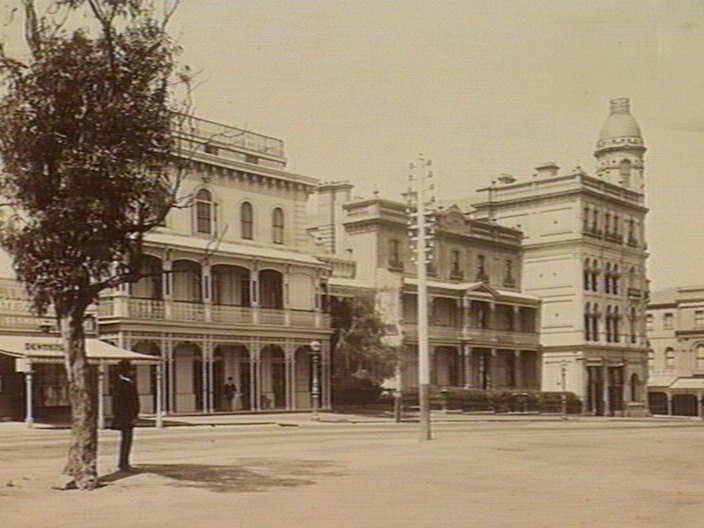
Looking towards Grey Street along Fitzroy Street from Albert Park in 1890, featuring the various buildings that made up the Terminus (now the George) Hotel

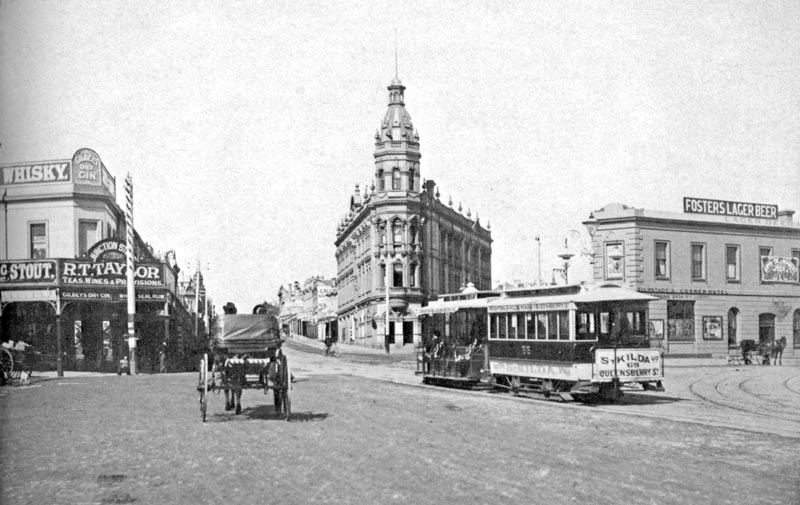
St Kilda Junction in the 1880s. From left to right, the streets visible are Wellington Street, High Street (now St Kilda Road), Barkly Street and Fitzroy Street. The tram tracks turning right into Fitzroy Street are visible in front of the Junction Hotel
