= St Kilda, Victoria =

St Kilda
- Suburb
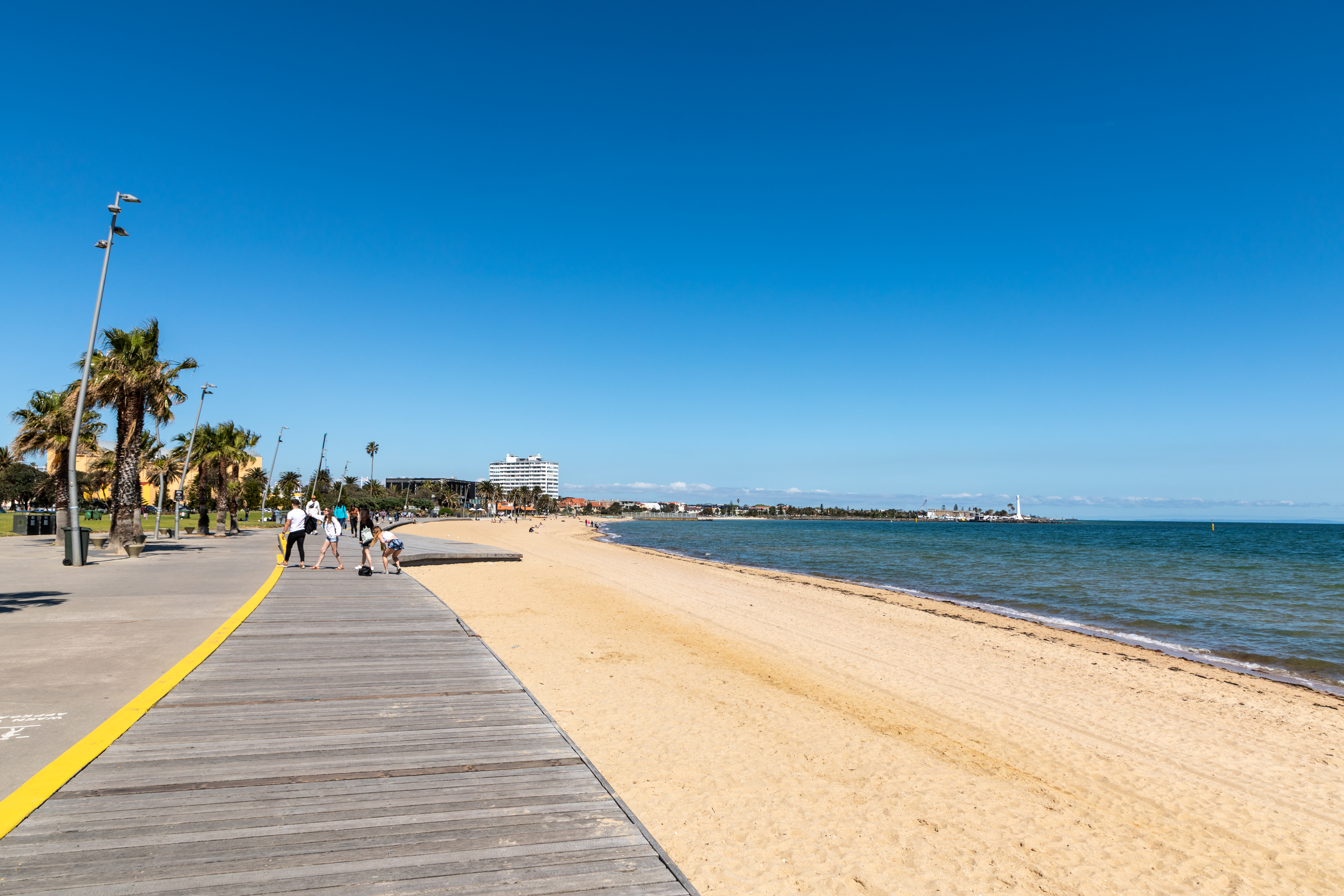
- St Kilda foreshore

- Interactive map of St Kilda
- Coordinates: 37.864°S 144.982°E
- Country: Australia
- State: Victoria
- City: Melbourne
- LGA: City of Port Phillip
- Location: 6 km (3.7 mi) from Melbourne CBD
- Established: 1839

Government
  - State electorates: Albert Park; Caulfield; Prahran
  - Federal division: Macnamara

Area
  - Total: 3.2 km^{2} (1.2 sq mi)
- Elevation: 13 m (43 ft)

Population
  - Total: 19,490 (2021 census)
  - Density: 6,090/km^{2} (15,770/sq mi)
- Postcode: 3182
Suburbs around St Kilda
St Kilda West	Albert Park and Lake	Windsor
Port Phillip	St Kilda	St Kilda East
Port Phillip	Elwood	Balaclava

St Kilda is an inner seaside suburb in Melbourne, Victoria, Australia, six kilometres (3 1/2 miles) southeast of the Melbourne central business district, located within the City of Port Phillip local government area. St Kilda recorded a population of 19,490 at the 2021 census. The beachfront and hill portion of the locality (between Fitzroy Street, the beach and St Kilda Road), is well known for its cafes, bars, palm trees and old flats and mansions, particularly along the main streets such as Fitzroy Street, Grey Street and Acland Street. The locality also includes the lower density areas between Barkly Street and Hotham Street, and the area south of Carlisle Street down to Dickens Street, as well as a part of Albert Park.

St Kilda was named by Charles La Trobe, then superintendent of the Port Phillip District, after a schooner, Lady of St Kilda, which moored at the main beach in early 1842. From the 1850s to the 1880s in the Victorian era, St Kilda became a favoured suburb of Melbourne's elite, and many palatial mansions and grand terraces were constructed along its hills, wide streets and waterfront. After the turn of the century, the St Kilda foreshore became Melbourne's favoured playground, with electric tram lines linking the suburbs to the seaside amusement rides, ballrooms, cinemas and cafes, and crowds flocked to St Kilda Beach. Many of the mansions and grand terraces became guest houses, and some demolished or their gardens were filled in with apartment buildings, making St Kilda the most densely populated suburb in Melbourne by the 1930s.

After World War II, St Kilda became Melbourne's red-light district, and the guest houses became low-cost rooming houses. By the late 1960s, St Kilda had developed a culture of bohemianism, attracting prominent artists and musicians, including those in the punk and LGBT subcultures. While some of these groups still maintain a presence in St Kilda, since the 2000s the district has experienced rapid gentrification, pushing many lower socio-economic groups out to other areas, with the suburb again being sought after by the wealthy. Since at least the 1950s, the suburb has been the centre of Melbourne's Jewish community.

St Kilda is home to many of Melbourne's visitor attractions including Luna Park, St Kilda Pier, the Palais Theatre and the Esplanade Hotel. It hosts many of Melbourne's big events and festivals.

== Name ==
Before being officially named St Kilda in 1842 by Charles La Trobe, who was superintendent of the Port Phillip District of New South Wales, the area was known by several names, including 'Green Knoll', 'Punk Town' and 'The Village of Fareham'. It was eventually named after the schooner Lady of St Kilda, which was owned between 1834 and 1840 by Sir Thomas Acland. Acland sold the vessel in 1840 to Jonathan Cundy Pope of Plymouth. The vessel sailed for Port Phillip in February 1841. The ship was used in Port Phillip as a cargo vessel; in January 1842 it was docked in Hobson Bay and listed for sale by exchange of sheep. The vessel was moored at the main beach for the early part of 1842, which was soon known as "the St Kilda foreshore".

The schooner Lady of St Kilda was named in honour of Lady Grange, who was imprisoned by her husband between 1734 and 1740 on the island of Hirta, the largest island in the St Kilda archipelago, on the western edge of Scotland.

== History ==
Early lithograph (1864) of St Kilda main beach, looking toward west beach and Port Melbourne

The Euroe Yroke area (now known as St Kilda) was inhabited an estimated 31,000 to 40,000 years ago. Evidence has been found of shellfish middens and huts along Albert Park and Lake and axes which were most likely sharpened on the sandstone cliffs behind the main beach. Corroborees were held at the historic tree which still stands at St Kilda Junction, at the corner of Fitzroy Street and Queens Road. Much of the area north of present-day Fitzroy Street was swampland, part of the Yarra River delta, which comprised vast areas of wetlands and sparse vegetation.

The first European settler in St Kilda was Benjamin Baxter in around 1839. He was a settler from Melbourne on a grazing lease. In 1840, St Kilda was the home to Melbourne's first quarantine station for Scottish immigrants.

The area was officially named St Kilda in 1842. The first sale of Crown lands for the village of St Kilda took place on 7 December 1842. The first block was bought by James Ross Lawrence, who had been master of the Lady of St Kilda until 1842. Lawrence had now settled in Melbourne. His block was bounded by three unmade roads. One of these roads he named Acland Street, after Thomas Acland, who had been his employer until 1840 but who had never been to Port Phillip District. The remaining two became Fitzroy Street and The Esplanade. (A plaque at the junction of Acland and Fitzroy Streets marks the site of the block.) By 1845, Lawrence had subdivided and sold the land on which he had built a cottage. The land on the sea side of The Esplanade has continued to be Crown land.

Sparsely settled at first, nevertheless the indigenous peoples were soon driven out. The high ground above the beach offered a cool fresh breeze during Melbourne's hot summer months, and the suburb offered such attractions that after the gold rush of the 1850s, St Kilda became the most fashionable area for the wealthy. By the 1880s, St Kilda hosted many mansions and grand terraces. The area east of St Kilda Road, sometimes known as St Kilda Hill, featured large villas and mansions in extensive grounds.

St Kilda became a separate municipality on 24 April 1857, and in the same year, the railway line connected St Kilda to Melbourne city, and a loop line to Windsor. These railway lines made the area even more attractive as a place to settle, and attracted visitors to St Kilda Beach, with attractions such as the St Kilda Pier, various privately run sea baths, and events like the St Kilda Cup. Cricket and bowling clubs were formed in 1855 and 1865 respectively. By the mid-1860s St Kilda had about fifteen hotels, including the George Hotel on Fitzroy Street (which began as the Terminus in 1857).

The wealthy elite included numerous Jewish families, and St Kilda's first synagogue was built in 1872 in Charnwood Grove.

What is now called St Kilda Road, south of the junction, was originally called High Street, and before it was widened was lined with shops.

=== Land boom ===
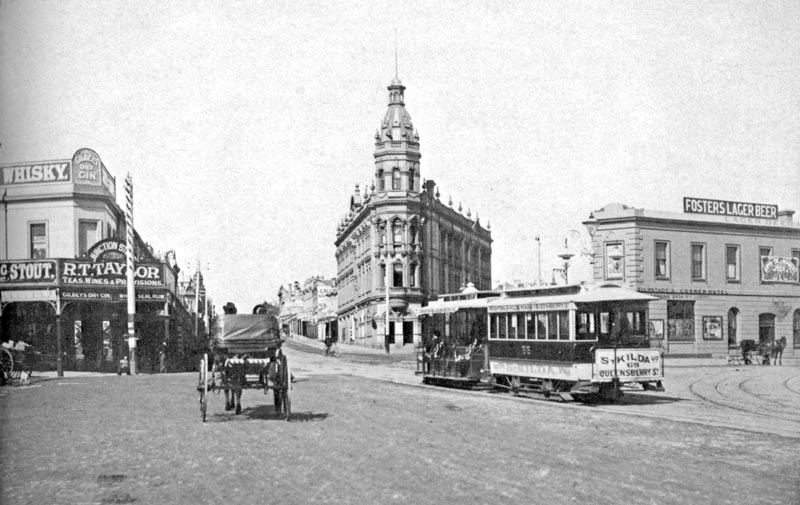
An 1880s photograph of St Kilda Junction looking south towards the Junction Hotel, cnr Barkly Street/ High Street (now St Kilda Road)

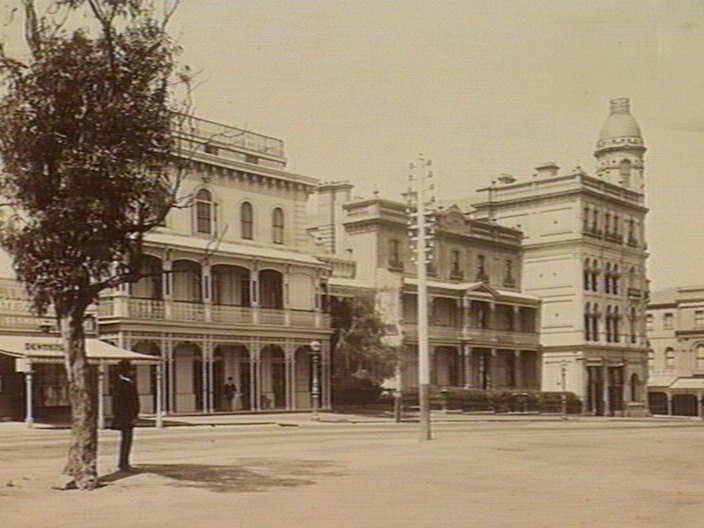
An 1890 photograph of Fitzroy Street looking toward the three blocks that made up the George Hotel

St Kilda's population more than doubled between 1870 and 1890, to about 19,000 persons. By the time of the Land Boom of the 1880s St Kilda the mansions and grand terraces were joined by palatial hotels - The Esplanade Hotel was built in 1878 overlooking St Kilda Beach, and the George Hotel opposite the station was greatly expanded in 1889. The smaller streets with smaller blocks between the big estates were developed with modest cottages and terraces, housing the working class population of the area.

Much of the area which is now St Kilda West was swampland, but was reclaimed and subdivided in the 1880s, though only the blocks closest to Fitzroy Street were built on at first.

Cable tram lines across Melbourne were built in the late 1880s, with a line from Swanston Street in central Melbourne along St Kilda Road to St Kilda Junction completed in 1888, and a line from Windsor station at Chapel Street along Wellington Street and Fitzroy Streets, then around the Esplanade, opened in 1891, making the suburb and the beachfront easily accessible.

=== Seaside playground ===
Robson's Figure Eight in 1908 on Lower Esplanade was part of Dreamland, the current site of Luna Park and the Palais Theatre

The boom of the 1880s ended with the bank crashes of the early 1890s and subsequent depression, affecting all levels of society, but ruining many of the newly wealthy. Many of St Kilda's mansions and spacious terrace houses became guest houses, and the wealthy elite retreated to other exclusive suburbs such as Brighton and Toorak.

From 1906, the Victorian Railways operated a tram line, described as an 'Electric Street Railway', from St Kilda Station to Brighton, via Grey Street, Barkly Street and Mitford Street in Elwood. The developing electric tram lines in the east and southeastern suburbs soon arrived as well, with two lines terminating in front of Luna Park by 1913, joined by the electric line that replaced the cable car in 1925, bringing cords of day-trippers to the beach front.

The hot sea baths and hotel on St Kilda main beach in 1910, which replaced the 1862 "Gymnasium Baths" but burned down and was itself replaced

Carlo Catani, a native of Italy, a local resident, and Chief Engineer of the Public Works Department, was a founding member of the St Kilda Foreshore Committee established in 1906, tasked with the beautification of the St Kilda foreshore, for which he did the design. His plan saw the creation of park and lawn areas, paths and promenades, rockeries and gardens and avenues of trees and palms right along the foreshore. The committee also oversaw the leases for the various amusement operators wishing to cater to the growing visitation to the area, which included the Dreamland amusement park (1906 - 1909), a new St Kilda Sea Baths (1910), which replaced the 1862 "Gymnasium Baths", Luna Park (1912), the Palais de Danse (1919 and 1926), the Palais Theatre (1927), and many others. Catani died in 1918 before he could see the full vision realised, and several landmarks along the foreshore have been named after him, including a memorial clock tower, gardens and an arch. Other amusements developed in the area, such as the Wattle Path Palais dance hall (later the St Moritz Ice Rink) on the Upper Esplanade, and the Venue next door, and the Victory Cinema in 1928 on the corner of Barkly and Carlisle (later the National Theatre). St Kilda served a similar function for Melburnians as did Coney Island to the residents of New York City. with Acland Street and Fitzroy Street became lined with shops, often built in the front gardens of the earlier houses, which housed numerous restaurants and cafes. Apartment development also concentrated in the area, some in the gardens of the mansions, some replacing them, or transforming them, with the result that St Kilda became the most densely populated suburb in Melbourne, often single people who moved away from family life, which combined with the numerous sometimes late night amusements, gave the suburb a racy reputation. This reputation was exacerbated by the Great Depression, and it became the growing focus of many of Melbourne's social issues including crime, prostitution and drug abuse.

St Kilda had been a favoured location for Melbourne's wealthier Jewish community in the 19th century, mostly from Britain or Germany, which continued through the interwar years; this included the large houses and estates east of St Kilda Road and into what is now East St Kilda. The community grew markedly just before and after World War II with refugees from war-torn European countries, who found the many apartments familiar and affordable. An Orthodox community developed along with the existing Reformed one, opening new synagogues and schools. Cafe Scheherazade on Acland Street was established in the 1950s, and served up eastern European borscht and latkes for decades, becoming an icon for this community. By the 1980s, the Jewish centre of Melbourne had moved eastward to the more suburban East St Kilda and Caulfield. Scheherazade moved to Caulfield in 2008, with very little Jewish presence in St Kilda remaining.

=== Decline ===
Crowds line the Esplanade to greet the Duke of York, arriving at St Kilda Pier, in 1927.

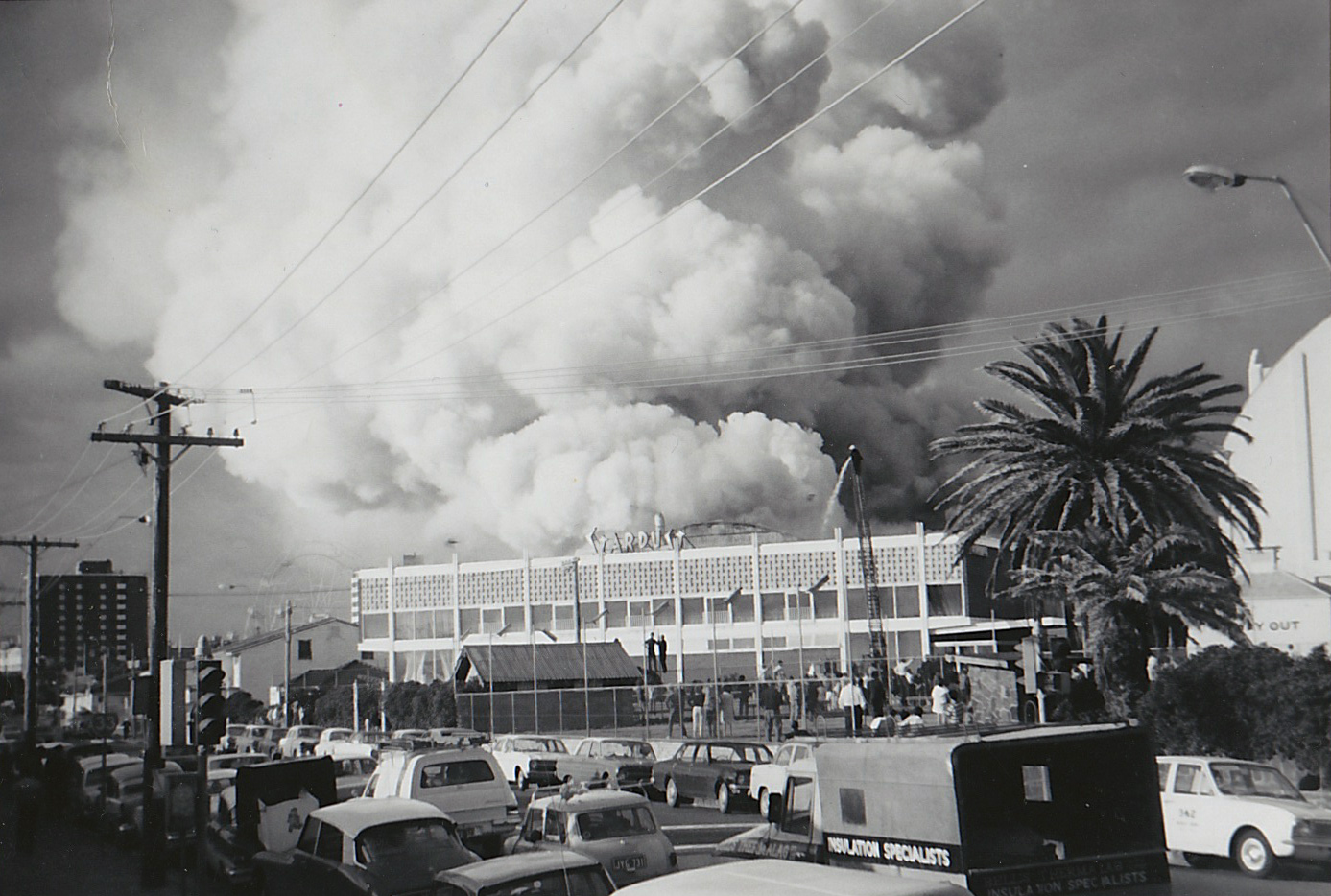
Stardust Lounge and Palais de Danse on fire in 1968

World War II saw servicemen flock to the beach amusements, where they also met women, increasing St Kilda's reputation for loose morals. Leo's Spaghetti bar and gelateria was opened for the Olympics in 1956 by an Italian migrant as one of Melbourne's first Italian restaurants and quickly became a Melbourne establishment.

With numerous small apartments, and plenty of meeting places, St Kilda became one of the city's main areas of bohemianism, as well as attracting a gay and lesbian population. From 1965, Mirka Mora's Tolarno Hotel became the focus of many of the local artists. By the mid-1960s the Fitzroy Street area had become known for prostitution, with a number of strip-tease cabarets, notably at the once high-class George Hotel.

In the early 1960s works to the Lower Esplanade turned it into a fast moving connection between Marine Parade and Beaconsfield Parade, creating a barrier to the beach, except for a pedestrian crossover and several traffic lights. In 1968, the Palais de Danse, adjacent to the Palais was gutted by fire. The Palace nightclub was built in its place in 1971 (in 2007 this building was closed, gutted by fire, and demolished).

In the late 1960s St Kilda Junction was rebuilt to create a Queens Way underpass connection to Dandenong Road, and in the early 1970s St Kilda Road (formerly High Street) from the junction to Carlisle Street was widened by demolishing all the properties on the west side. The landmark Junction Hotel was lost, and High Street, once St Kilda's shopping centre, ceased to function as such. The widening also had the effect of creating a physical barrier between St Kilda's foreshore, civic area and eastern residential streets.

The St Moritz ice rink was closed in 1981; around 1982, it was destroyed by a fire.

In 1987, the St Kilda railway line was closed, rationalised and re-opened to become part of route 96, one of the first light rail lines in Melbourne, which left the former rail line at Fitzroy Street, running around the Esplanade, terminating at Acland Street.

=== Gentrification ===
St Kilda also experienced increased gentrification during the 1990s, particularly popular with yuppies due to its proximity to the CBD. The increased cost of rentals led many long-term residents to leave and removed much of the bohemian and artistic character of the area.

In 1991, the St Moritz hotel opened in the site of the St Moritz ice rink, later the Novotel Bayside in 1993, then Novotel St Kilda in 1999, and itself demolished in 2020.

On 11 September 2003, the St Kilda icon, the 99-year-old pier kiosk, burned down in an arson attack. In a swift and overwhelming response to the loss, the government committed to its original plans using what remained of the original materials.

In mid-1998, Becton, new owners of the Esplanade Hotel announced its plan to build a 125-metre, 38-storey tower behind the historic hotel. The plans were later scaled down due to a strong community campaign, but in 2004, Baymour Court, a significant 1920s Spanish Mission flats behind were demolished despite the campaigning of the National Trust of Victoria and The Esplanade Alliance, as part of the hi-rise Esplanade apartment building.

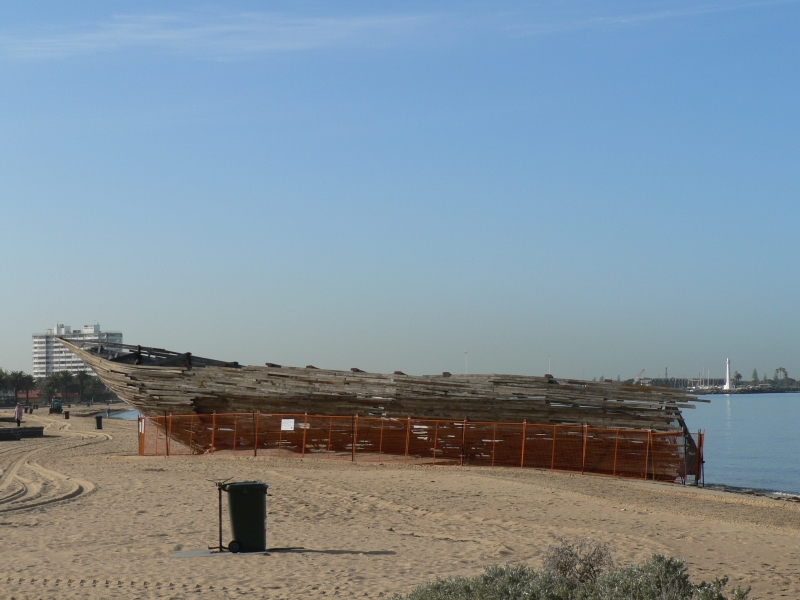
Lady of St Kilda sculpture at St Kilda main beach in 2006

For the 2006 Commonwealth Games, St Kilda hosted an interpretive public artwork called the Lady of St Kilda, a mock timber sculpture of the shipwreck. The installation was visited by locals and tourists and it was left erected for many months afterward. However, the sculpture was subject to vandals disassembling parts of it as well as concern for children's safety on the high unprotected bow of the "ship" so the local council removed it in November 2006.

The area adjacent to the Palais Theatre known as the Triangle Site, including the Palace music venue, is the subject of a major re-development, first proposed in 2005. The proposals stipulated the restoration of the Palais Theatre, but controversially many advocated the demolition of the Palace, one of the area's main live music venues. To save the Palace, a legal battle ensued. Ironically, the Palace burned down spectacularly during an arson attack, and fears were held for the Palais. The winning development in 2007 plans a series of lanes, promenades and walkways rambling through eating and drinking spaces, art installations, entertainment venues, retail outlets and open grassy spaces. Further controversy over the new development was caused when the tenants who vacated the Palais illegally removed its 80-year-old chandeliers.

In 2006, plans went out for a foreshore re-development, which included promenade widening and saw the demolition of the bicentennial pavilion which marked the land end of the St Kilda pier.

In 2006, the proposed development of a skate park and concrete urban plaza over parkland on Fitzroy Street next to the primary school at Albert Park caused significant local controversy. The council received a large number of objections. Alternative sites along the foreshore were ignored by council and all of the mature trees on the site were removed before the plans were presented for consultation.

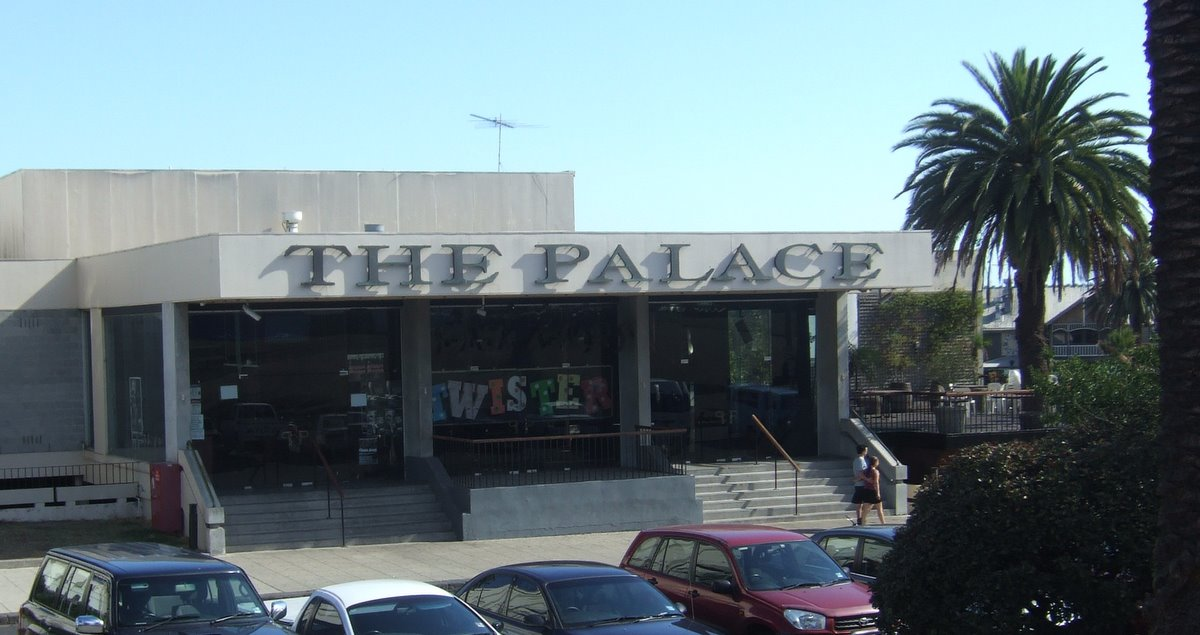
The Palace, a once popular music venue, was demolished soon after a fire in July 2007

In February 2008, the Port Phillip Council's approval of the proposed Triangle site development despite over 5,000 written objections (representing over a quarter of the population of St Kilda) caused an uproar in St Kilda which saw media attention across Victoria with local resident lobby groups including Save St Kilda and UnChain St Kilda banding thousands of residents together in protest and enlisting the help of celebrities including Dave Hughes, Magda Subzanski and Rachel Griffiths in their fight against the local council. The council had refused to allow a secret agreement between it, the developers and state government to be released which effectively allowed for the transfer of ownership of a large amount of Crown land to private owners. As well as the outrage over the sale of public land, many residents believed that the state government and council should have funded the restoration of the heritage Palais themselves rather than pass the costs on to the developers who had proposed a larger development to recover their own costs.

In May 2008, the skate park development was stopped by the Supreme Court of Victoria, claiming that the council had acted inappropriately. A hearing was scheduled with the Victorian Civil and Administrative Tribunal. The mayor at the time, Janet Bolitho, was cited to have commented "the area would remain public open space – just maybe not green".

In December 2009, a new council elected to largely replace the councillors who approved the Triangle development voted almost unanimously to terminate the agreement with the developers, agreeing to pay them $5 million over a period of three years.

In the 12-month period to January 2020 St Kilda reported a median house price of A$1.34 million for a three bedroom house.

== Demography ==
Historical population
Year	Pop.	±%
2001	15,270	—
2006	16,122	+5.6%
2011	17,795	+10.4%
2016	20,230	+13.7%

In the 2016 census, there were 20,230 people in St Kilda. 51.3% of people were born in Australia. The next most common countries of birth were England 5.2%, New Zealand 3.8%, India 2.1%, Ireland 1.9% and China 1.4%. 66.2% of people spoke only English at home. Other languages spoken at home included Mandarin 1.7%, Spanish 1.7%, Italian 1.5%, French 1.4% and Russian 1.2%. The most common response for religion was No Religion at 45.5%.

Today, St Kilda is an area of sharp social contrast, with many homeless and other disadvantaged people living among the wealthy and fashionable who crowd its shops and cafes. Since the 2000s, the suburb became the favoured destination for Melbourne's backpackers..

For many years, St Kilda has had the highest population density in the Melbourne statistical area, and the highest for a metropolitan area outside of Sydney. This density is reflected in the built form, which has a high density of apartments and flats, built from the 1910s to the present, including a single Housing Commission of Victoria tower.

== Culture ==
=== Arts ===
Linden New Art gallery is the main visual arts venue and cultural tourism destination in St Kilda. In 1986 it opened as a public art gallery in "Linden", a two-storey 1871 mansion owned by the St Kilda City Council (now City of Port Phillip). The gallery's exhibitions program focusses on the work of mid-career contemporary Australian artists and since 1990 its fundraising Linden Postcard Show is an annual highlight.

=== Theatre and cinema ===
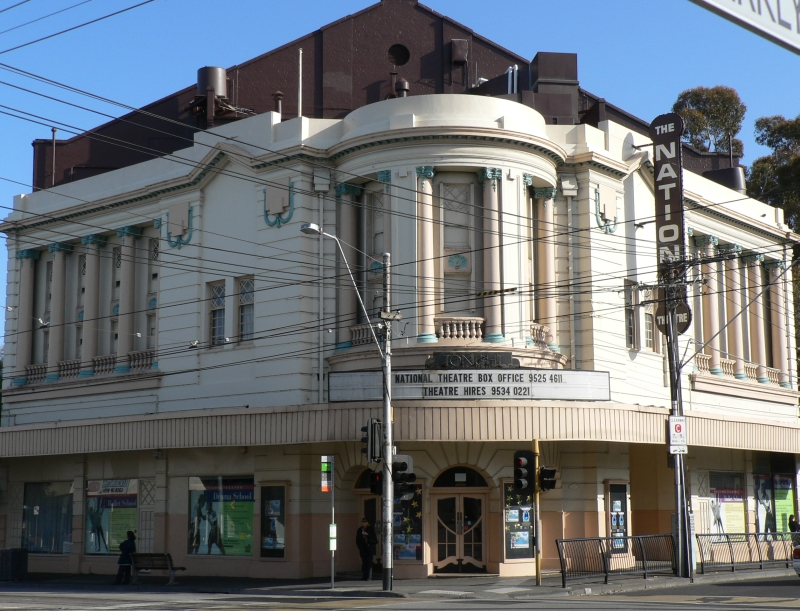
National Theatre

St Kilda has three historic theatres, each catering to a different niche use; all are listed on the Victorian Heritage Register.

- The National Theatre (formerly the Victory) on the corner of Barkly and Carlisle Streets is a Beaux Arts styled performing arts venue built in 1920 and rebuilt in 1928, which has been home to the oldest theatre school in Australia since 1974.
- The Palais Theatre is located on the Lower Esplanade and was built in 1927 to the design of Henry Eli White as a cinema and has been used as a live music and concert venue since the 1970s.
- The Astor Theatre on Chapel Street is a Art Deco style cinema built in 1935 to the design of Ray Morton Taylor. It features the largest screen in the Southern Hemisphere, and operates as an arthouse cinema with its own year-long film festival and private functions.

A cinema duplex called the George was built in the 1990s on Fitzroy Street next to the George Hotel, and has been occupied since 2015 by The Alex Theatre.

=== Places of worship ===
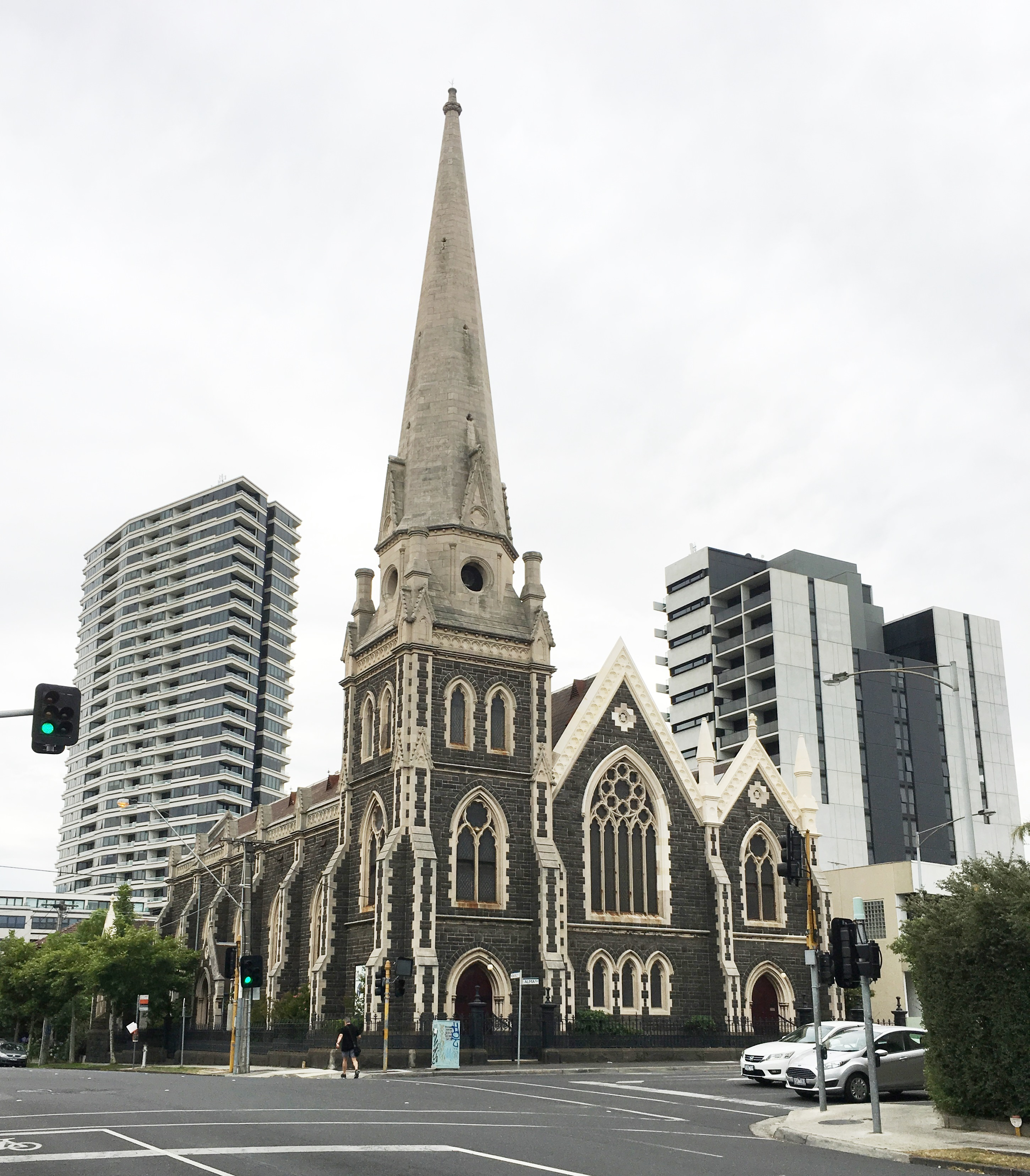
St Kilda Presbyterian Church

St Kilda is home to a large number of places of worship built over the years to serve primarily the Christian and Jewish faiths, although many of the churches have since been converted for other uses. The St Kilda Hebrew Congregation was established in the 1870s in Charnwood Road, with the present building consecrated on 13 March 1927. Temple Beth Israel, the country's largest Progressive Jewish congregation, on Alma Road in East St Kilda, was consecrated in 1938.

The oldest church is Christ Church on the corner Acland Street and Church Square, built in 1854–57 to the designs of Purchas & Swyer in Gothic Revival style and enlarged in 1874 and 1881. It is part of complex including a manse and a hall. The small bluestone Gothic Wesleyan Methodist (later Uniting) Church on the corner Fitzroy and Princes Streets was built in 1858, designed by Crouch & Wilson, and became part of an apartment complex in the late 1990s. All Saints' Anglican Church, on the corner of Dandenong Road and Chapel Street, was designed by Nathaniel Billing with the foundation stone laid in 1858, becoming what is believed to be the largest Anglican parish church in the southern hemisphere, able to seat 1400 people, All Saints' is also known for its male choir, which is the only parish church choir of its kind remaining in Australia. The former Baptist Church, built in 1876 at 16 Crimea Street served as a masonic hall before being acquired by St Michael's Grammar School. The St Kilda Parish Mission Uniting Church, built in 1877 on the corner Chapel and Carlisle Streets, has a polychromatic brick and slate roof design. St Kilda Presbyterian Church, built in 1878 on the corner of Alma Road and Barkly Street was designed by Wilson & Beswicke architects, in a notably bold Italian medieval style. The Holy Trinity Church built between 1882 and 1889 on the corner of Brighton Road and Dickens Street is by renowned architect Joseph Reed of Reed & Barnes. The Sacred Heart Church, a St Kilda landmark with its tall tower, built on Grey Street in 1890 is another church by Reed in partnership with Henderson & Smart architects.

=== Events and festivals ===
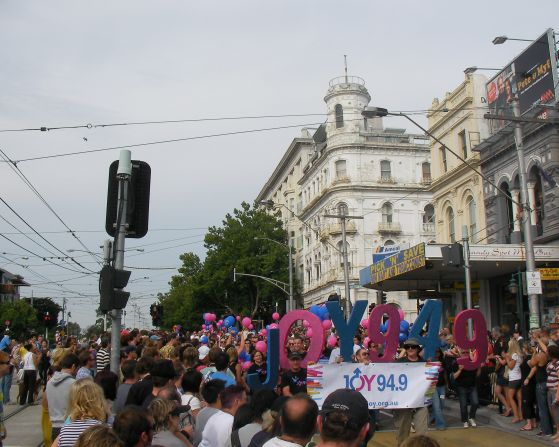
Midsumma pride march in 2008

St Kilda is home to many major annual events. The largest of these is the St Kilda Festival. Hailed as Australia's Largest Free Music Festival the one-day event features live music, dance performances, community activities, carnival rides, street performances, market and food stalls, and a dedicated children's area. Since the first St Kilda Festival in 1980 the event has grown in scale and now attracts over half a million visitors each year. St Kilda also hosts the annual gay Pride March, which starts at Lakeside Drive and heads down Fitzroy Street to the Catani Gardens. The St Kilda Short Film Festival is Australia's longest running short film festival and has been showcasing Australian short films since 1983. The week-long event kicks off with a star-studded Opening Night at St Kilda's Palais Theatre each year. St Kilda is also home to the many venues of the Melbourne Underground Film Festival. Until 2009, St Kilda was home to the Community Cup festival which celebrates grassroots Australian rules football having attracted record attendances of up to 23,000 and raising money for local charity the Sacred Heart Mission. A similar annual celebrity cricket match known as Batting for the Battlers is played at the Peanut Farm opposite Luna Park and attracts a crowd of up to 2,000. Other local events include the St Kilda Film Festival and St Kilda Writers Festival. St Kilda even has its own, locally organised TEDx event TEDxStKilda, which is based on the TED format and ideals.

St Kilda has run Melbourne's first major arts and crafts market which has been run on the Esplanade every Sunday since the 1980s. It has been rivalled in Melbourne in recent years by the Southbank art and craft market on Southbank promenade.

=== Music ===
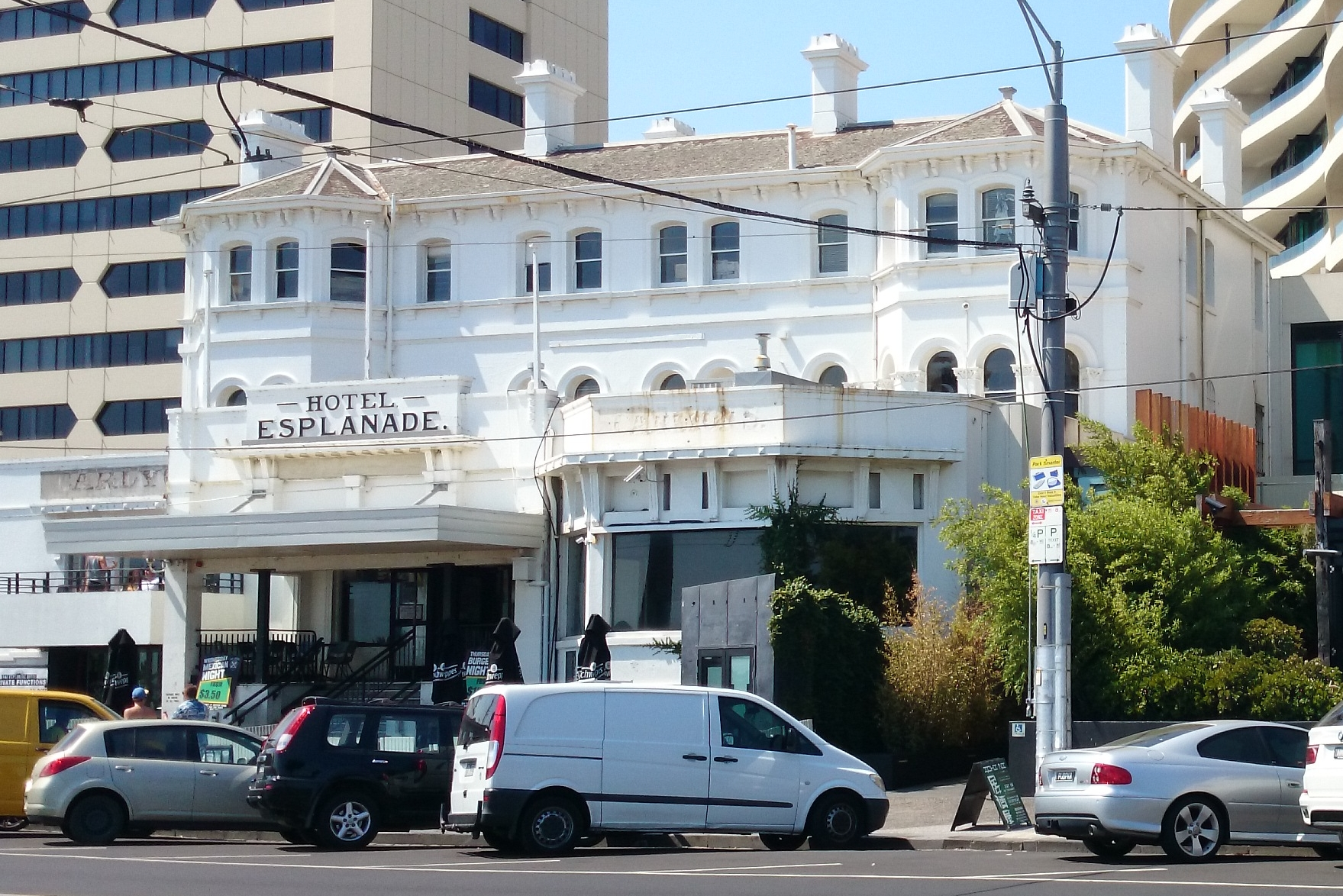
The Esplanade Hotel, a popular venue for alternative music

St Kilda has a vibrant music scene that has produced many notable bands and artists. During the late 1970s, it became a hotbed of dark, noisy post-punk, pioneered by locals bands The Birthday Party (featuring Nick Cave and Rowland S. Howard), The Moodists and Crime & the City Solution. These and other groups such as Hunters & Collectors regularly played at the Crystal Ballroom, one of the city's most iconic venues. Paul Kelly, Tex Perkins, Fred Negro, and dozens of other independent musicians have also called St Kilda home at some point. The scene of this era is documented in Unplugged in St Kilda, a 2022 interview podcast produced by Sally Moore for the St Kilda Historical Society.. Prominent local music venues include the Palais Theatre for larger concerts, the Esplanade Hotel (commonly known as "The Espy"), the Prince of Wales Hotel for larger gigs and DJ's (and backpackers), The George Public Bar on Saturday afternoons, and the St Kilda Bowls Club.

=== Sport ===
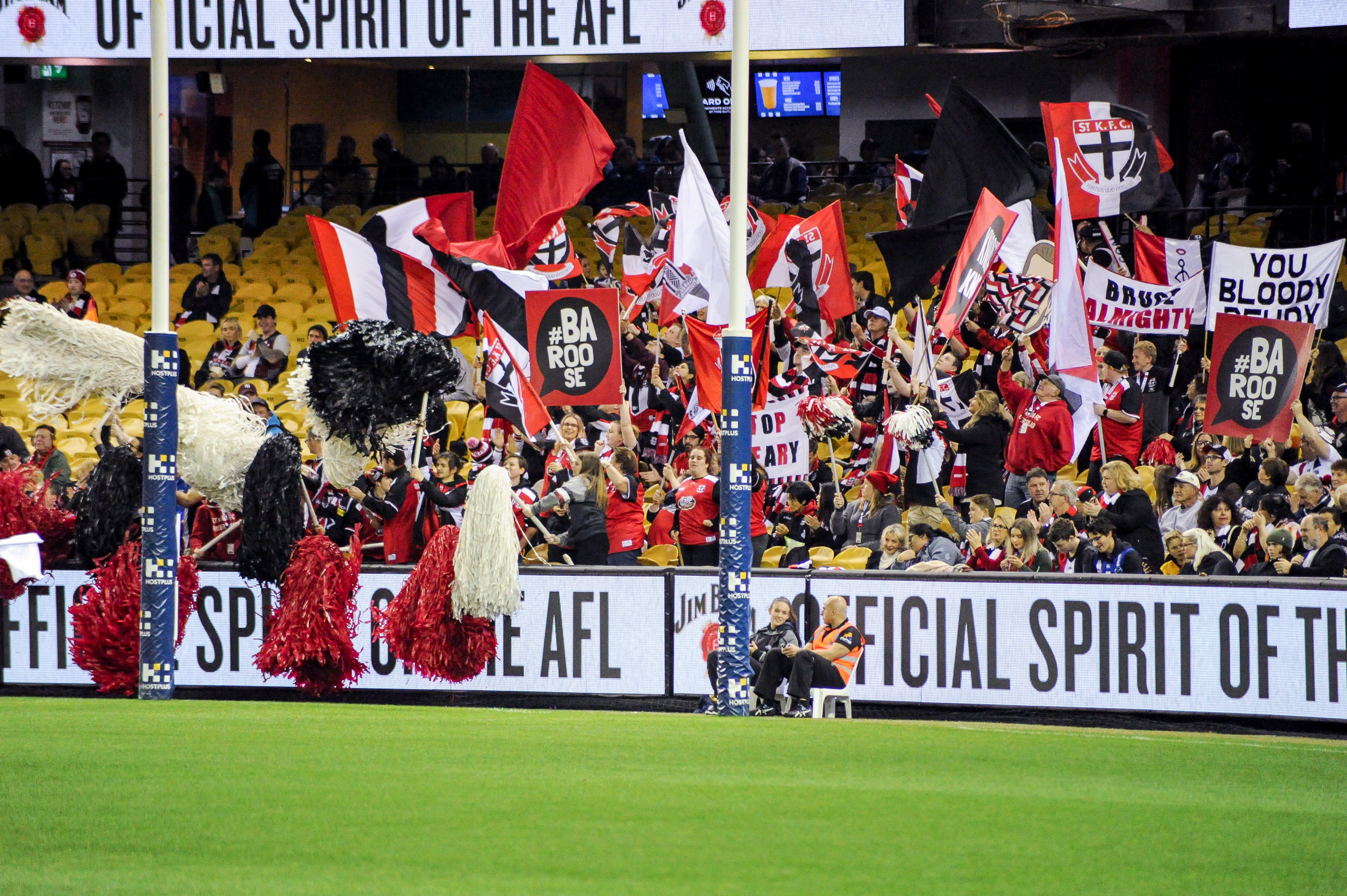
The St Kilda Football Club cheer squad during a 2017 AFL match

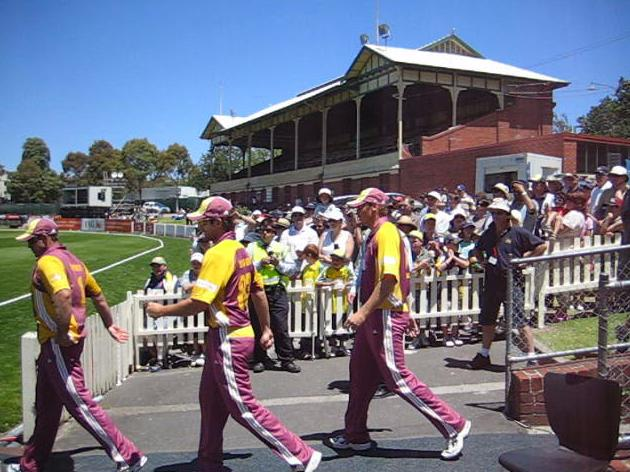
Junction Oval

St Kilda has very strong historical links with Australian rules football. The St Kilda Football Club, nicknamed the Saints, formed in 1873, and currently competes in the national Australian Football League (AFL). Originally based locally at Junction Oval, the team has played its home games at several venues outside St Kilda since 1965. Its current home ground is Docklands Stadium. The St Kilda City Football Club of the Southern Football League is based at the Peanut Farm. St Kilda also has Women's Australian rules football team, the St Kilda Sharks, who won back-to-back Victorian Women's Football League titles in 1998&99. Albert Park and Lake reserve has a number of ovals which are home to Australian rules football clubs. These include the historic Junction Oval which has in the past been a prominent VFL/AFL venue and more recently a training facility for the Melbourne Football Club. Several amateur VAFA clubs also use the park for their home grounds including the Collegians Football Club (Harry Trott Oval), Powerhouse Football Club (Ross Gregory Oval) and Old Melburnians (Junction Oval) are based in the St Kilda section of Albert Park. The Community Cup was a community Australian rules event, run for 14 years by the local Sacred Heart Mission, which until 2007 drew crowds of up to 23,000 spectators.

St Kilda also has a strong cricket presence. The Junction Oval is home to the St Kilda Cricket Club and occasionally the Victorian Bushrangers Cricket Club and was the debut venue of Shane Warne. St Kilda has a wide range of other minor sports including the Collegians-X hockey club, the St Kilda baseball club, an ultimate disc club, and several social soccer clubs.

St Kilda has a Lawn Bowls scene which attracts younger players and has been popularised in film and television. The St Kilda Lawn Bowls Club on Fitzroy Street has a long history and retains its heritage clubhouse building as well as hosts many community events.

Many of the open water events of the 2007 World Aquatics Championships were held at St Kilda beach. The 2006 Commonwealth Games triathlon and cycling time trials were held along the foreshore, and the marathon passed through some of St Kilda's main streets. The annual Melbourne Marathon also passes through St Kilda. St Kilda Beach is regularly used for state and international beach volleyball tournaments.

=== Recreation and leisure ===
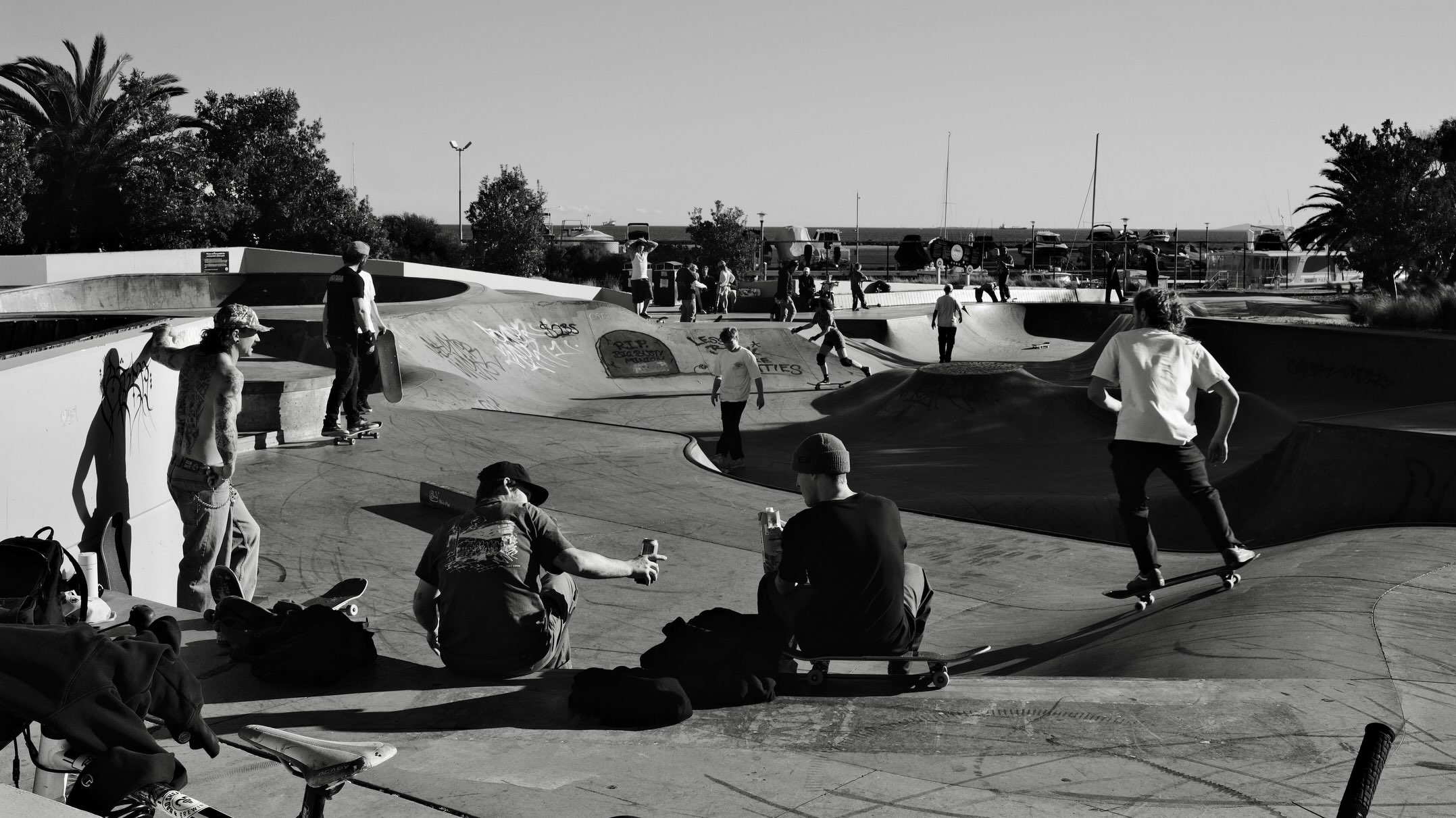
Skatepark on the St Kilda foreshore.

Recreation on St Kilda West and Middle Park beaches includes most watersports, including windsurfing, sailing, kitesurfing, rollerblading, beach volleyball, diving, jetskiing, waterskiing, sunbathing and skydiving with Skydive the Beach Melbourne. A skate park for the Fitzroy street end of Albert Park is in the planning stages as well as the existing skate park on Marine Parade.

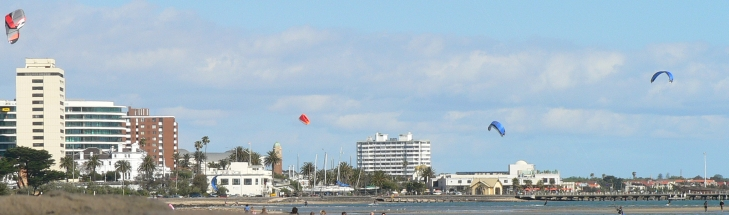
Kitesurfing on St Kilda Beach

== Built environment ==
=== Local landmarks ===
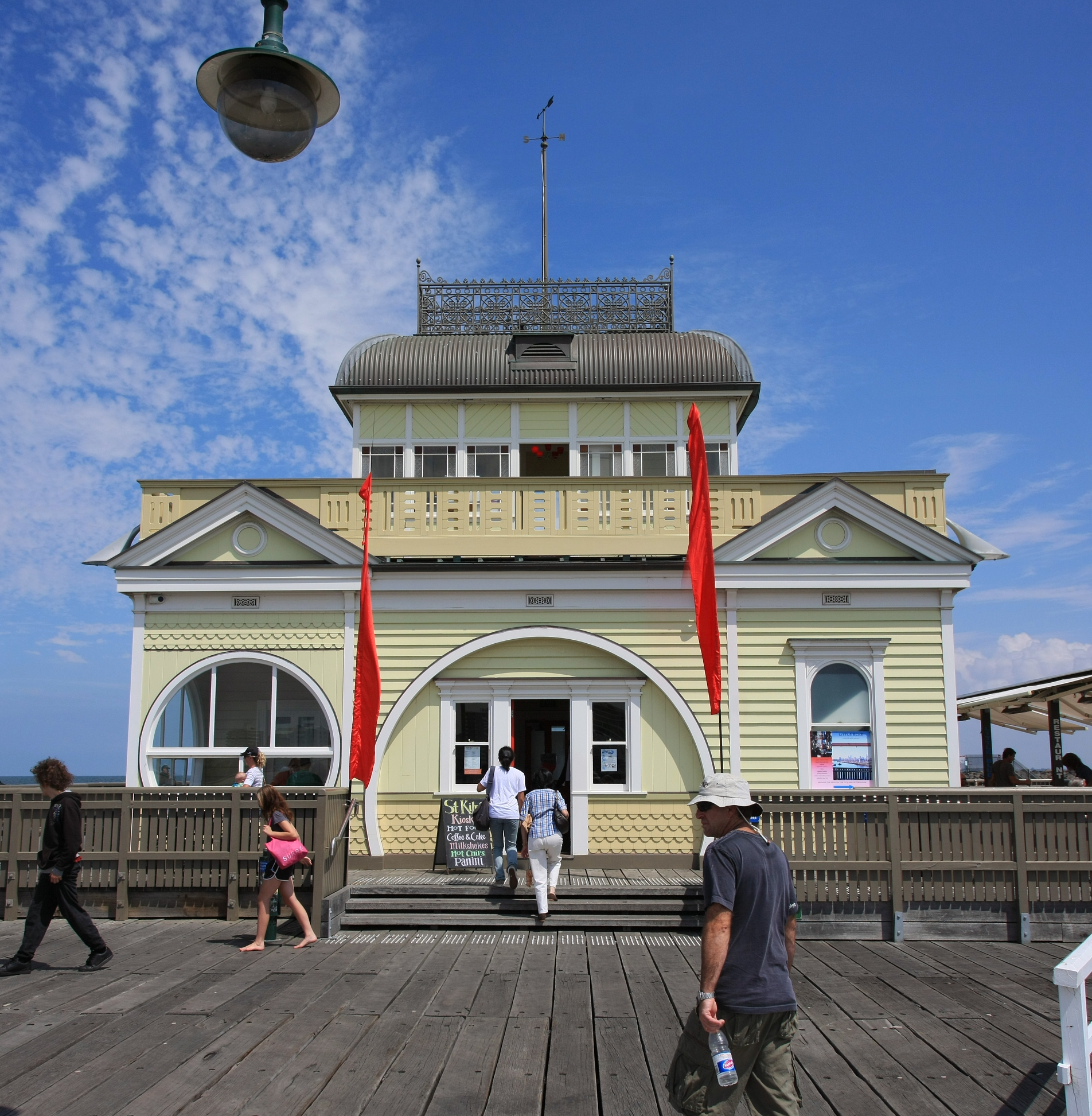
St Kilda Pavilion, formerly Kerby's Kiosk

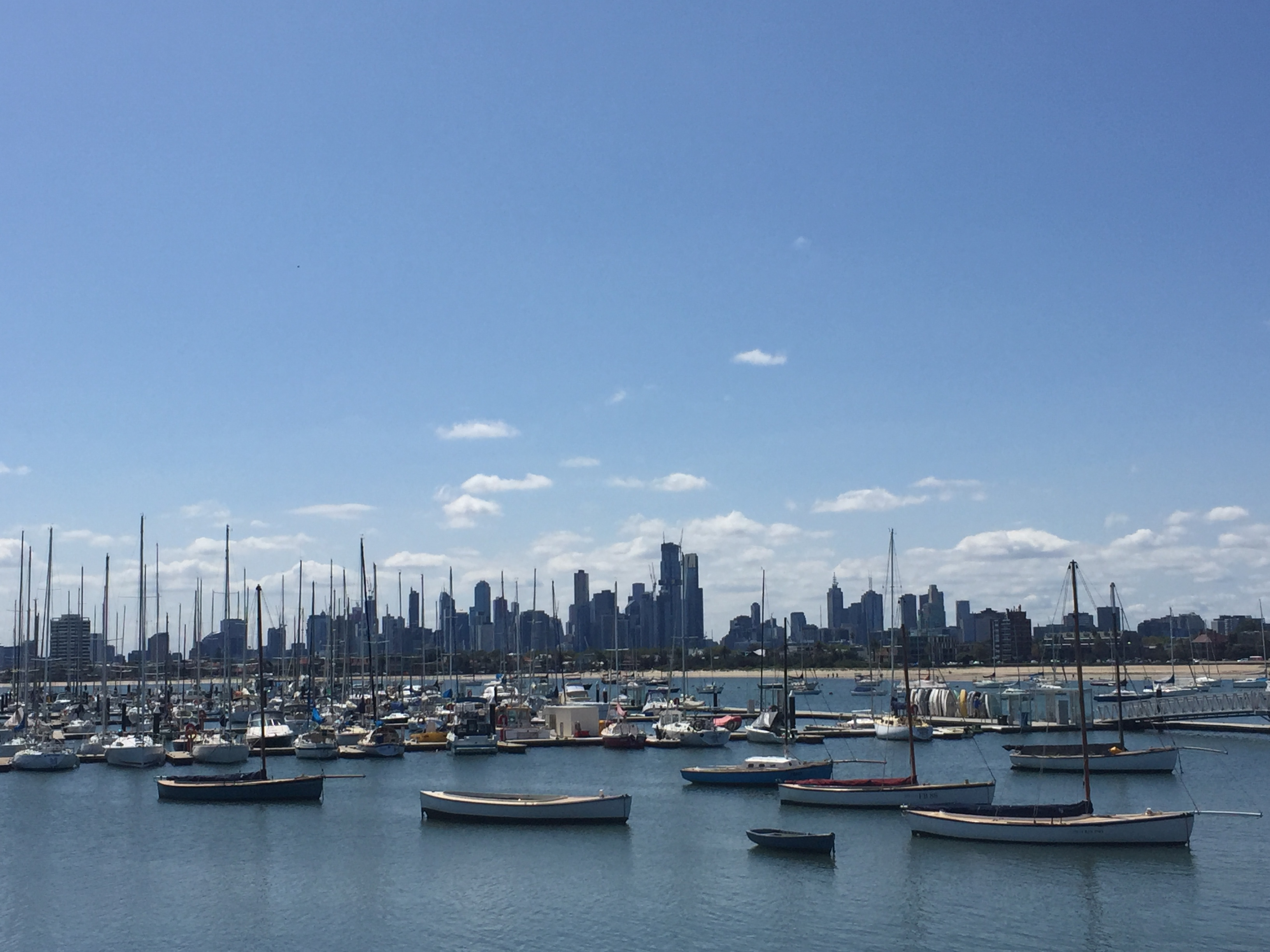
View from St Kilda Pier towards Melbourne CBD

St Kilda has many distinctive local landmarks, most centred on the St Kilda Esplanade and foreshore area, several featuring domes of a Moorish architecture theme established at the turn of the century. Perhaps the best known is Luna Park an early-20th century amusement park with its "Moonface" entry and its historic scenic railway.

The St Kilda Pier is another local landmark and major tourist attraction. The pier is terminated by the St Kilda Pavilion, an Edwardian building in the mould of English pier pavilions which is considered of high cultural importance to Melbournians. It was reconstructed and listed on the Victorian Heritage Register after burning down. The pier has a long breakwater which shelters St Kilda Harbour and hosts a little penguin colony.

St Kilda Beach, with gentle bay waves, is popular with swimmers and sunbathers during the summer months. As with most metropolitan beaches near the mouth of the Yarra, however, it has poor water quality.

The St Kilda Sea Baths was a Moorish-themed building constructed in the late 1920s and demolished in the 1990s, leaving only the two turrets. After much delay, after the original developer Hannah Friedman ran out of money, it was redeveloped to resemble in a small way the original style and continues a history of sea baths in St Kilda which dates back to the 1850s. Sometime referred to as "Chadstone by the Sea" (Chadstone being a huge shopping mall).

Acland Street is a shopping and restaurant precinct with numerous cake shops and cafes. It also features a number of public artworks. It is now a dead-end street, with a tram stop and plaza blocking it at Barkly Street.

St Kilda Town Hall is a building originally by William Pitt. It was burnt down in the 1980s and the interior has been extensively redesigned. Directly opposite is the St Kilda Public Library, built between 1971 and 1973 at 150 Carlisle Street. This is a brutalist design by architect Enrico Taglietti, designed to open like a book; it also includes Ashton Raggatt McDougall's award-winning extension (1994).

=== Residential architecture ===
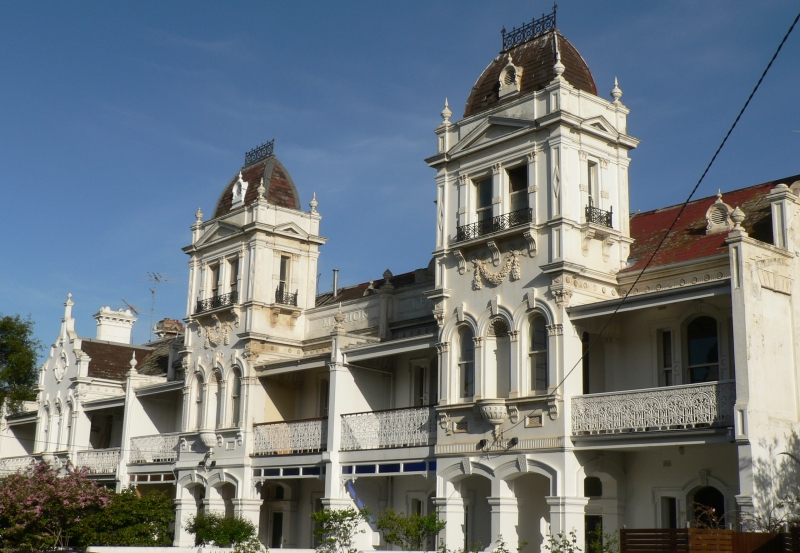
Marion Terrace

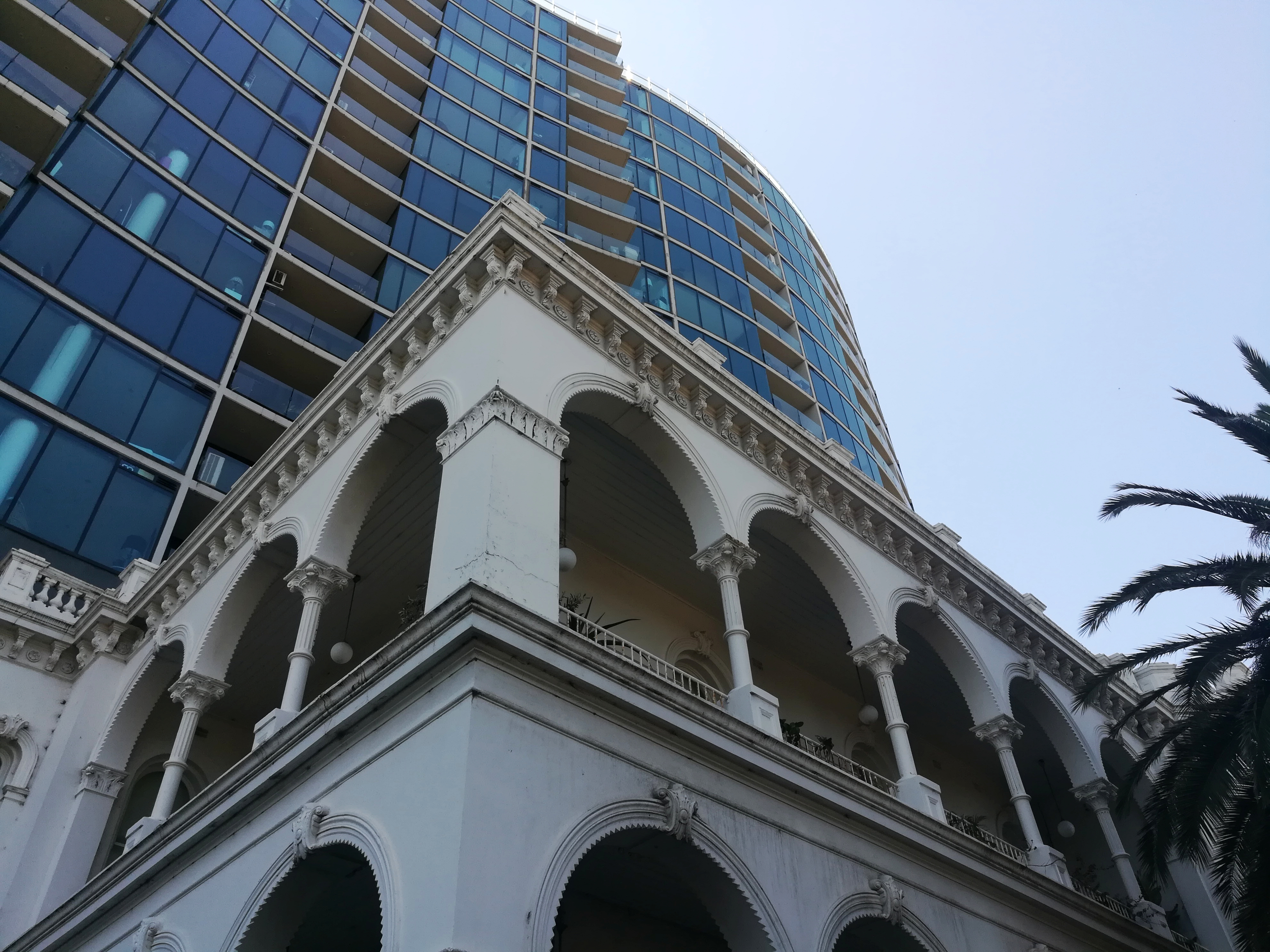
A Victorian era mansion retained as part of a modern apartment building

With many layers of development, St Kilda is characterised by an eclectic mix of residential styles, ranging from rows of Victorian terrace houses, Edwardian and interwar homes and apartments to post-war and modern infill development. Much of St Kilda's architecture is recognised as nationally significant.

St Kilda is home to many "boom style" mansions, dating back to the early days of the seaside resort. Historic residences include Eildon Mansion on Grey Street built in 1855 (later modified) to the design of Reed and Barnes is a significant grand old mansion. Hewison House, built at 25 Chapel Street in 1869, is a former mansion that has become an administration building of St Michael's Grammar School. Marion Terrace in Burnett Street was built in 1883 and is considered one of the finest Second Empire styled terrace houses in Australia. Myrnong Hall built in 1890 on Acland Street is a large Victorian mansion richly decorated in cast iron.

Edwardian buildings include The Priory, built in 1890 at 61 Alma Road, it is one of the few Richardsonian Romanesque homes in Melbourne, built as the boarding house for a ladies' school, but now a private residence.

During the interwar years St Kilda was heavily subdivided into apartments. This era produced some outstanding early apartment designs, including Majestic Mansions on Fitzroy Street (1912). Tompkins is a mixture of Edwardian styles and are some of the earliest self-contained flats in Melbourne. Summerland Mansions built in 1920 on Fitzroy Street is another block in the "mansion flats" style, a style rare in Melbourne. Belmont Flats on the corner of Alma Road and Chapel Street was built in 1923, an outstanding blend of Arts and Crafts and Californian Bungalow influences applied to an apartment building, was built in 1923. Belvedere Flats at 22 Esplanade on the corner of Robe Street was built in 1929 and is a Spanish Mission styled block of flats designed by William H. Merritt and has featured on The Secret Life of Us. All of these buildings are listed on the Victorian Heritage Register. A significant block of Spanish Mission flats, the Baymor Court, built in 1929 was demolished in November 2004 to make way for the Esplanade high-rise apartment development.

Edgewater Towers, completed in 1961, was Melbourne's first privately developed high-rise block and the tallest in Victoria.

St Kilda is also home to some contemporary residential designs. St Leonards Apartments in St Leonards Street is two blocks of post-modern apartments, built in 1996 to the design of Nonda Katsalidis, and is recognised with multiple RAIA Victorian Architecture Awards.

=== Historic hotel buildings ===
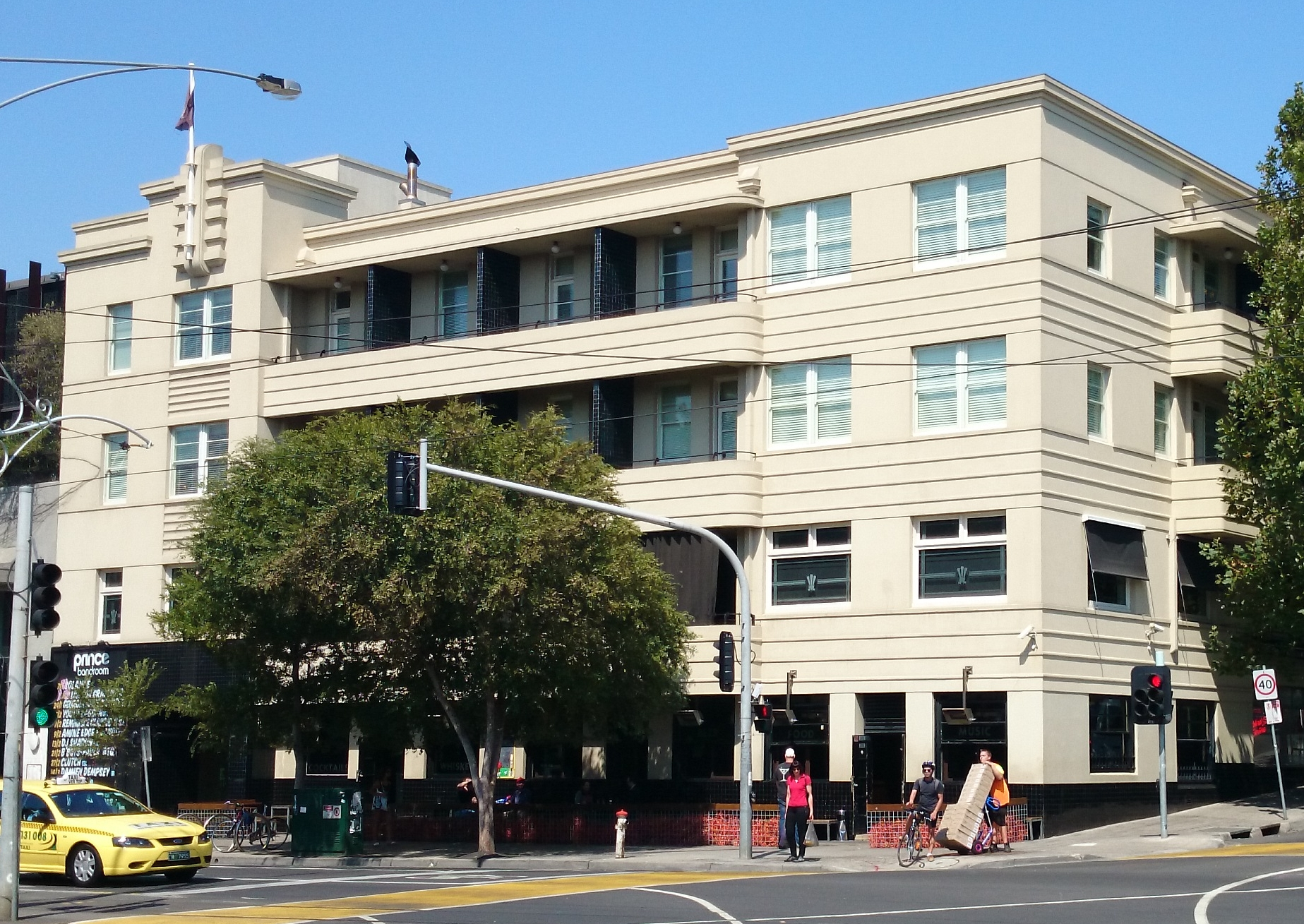
Established in 1862, the Prince of Wales Hotel was rebuilt in an art deco style in 1936. It has since gained fame as an alternative music venue.

St Kilda features many grand old hotels, some which still operate as licensed premises and others that function as accommodation, most of which are listed on the Victorian Heritage Register. These include the Esplanade Hotel on the Esplanade. Built in 1878 and later modified, the Esplanade is a pub and live music venue known by locals as the 'Espy'. The St Kilda Coffee Palace, built in the 1870s was once the St Kilda's main coffee palace. It is now a hostel. The George Hotel was built in 1887 on the corner of Fitzroy and Grey streets. From 1979 to the mid-1980s the "Crystal Ballroom" at the George (briefly the Seaview Hotel) became a punk music venue, launching artists such as Nick Cave, Hunters & Collectors, Models and many more. In the 1990s, it was converted into studio apartments. More recently, the ground floor has been renovated and is now a function venue, nightclub and bar called The George Whitebar and Gallery. The Prince of Wales Hotel was built in 1940 in the moderne style on the site of the first Prince of Wales which was built in 1920. It has been used as a cabaret venue and is now another live music venue.

=== Parks and gardens ===
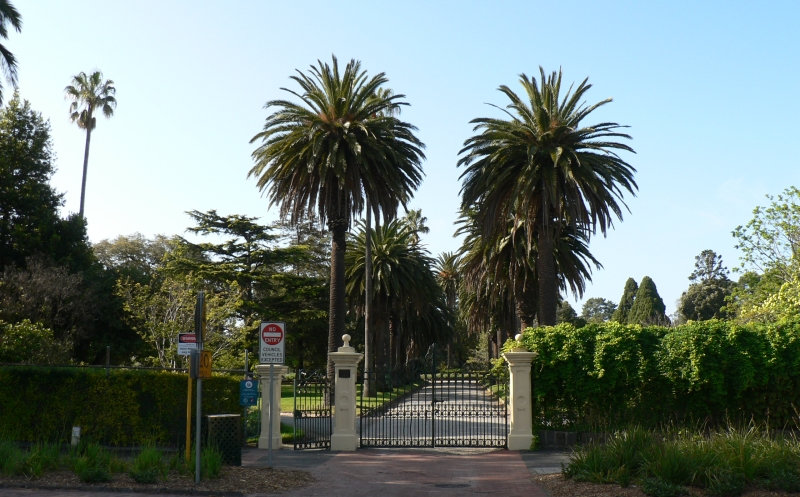
Entry gates to the St Kilda Botanical Gardens from Blessington St

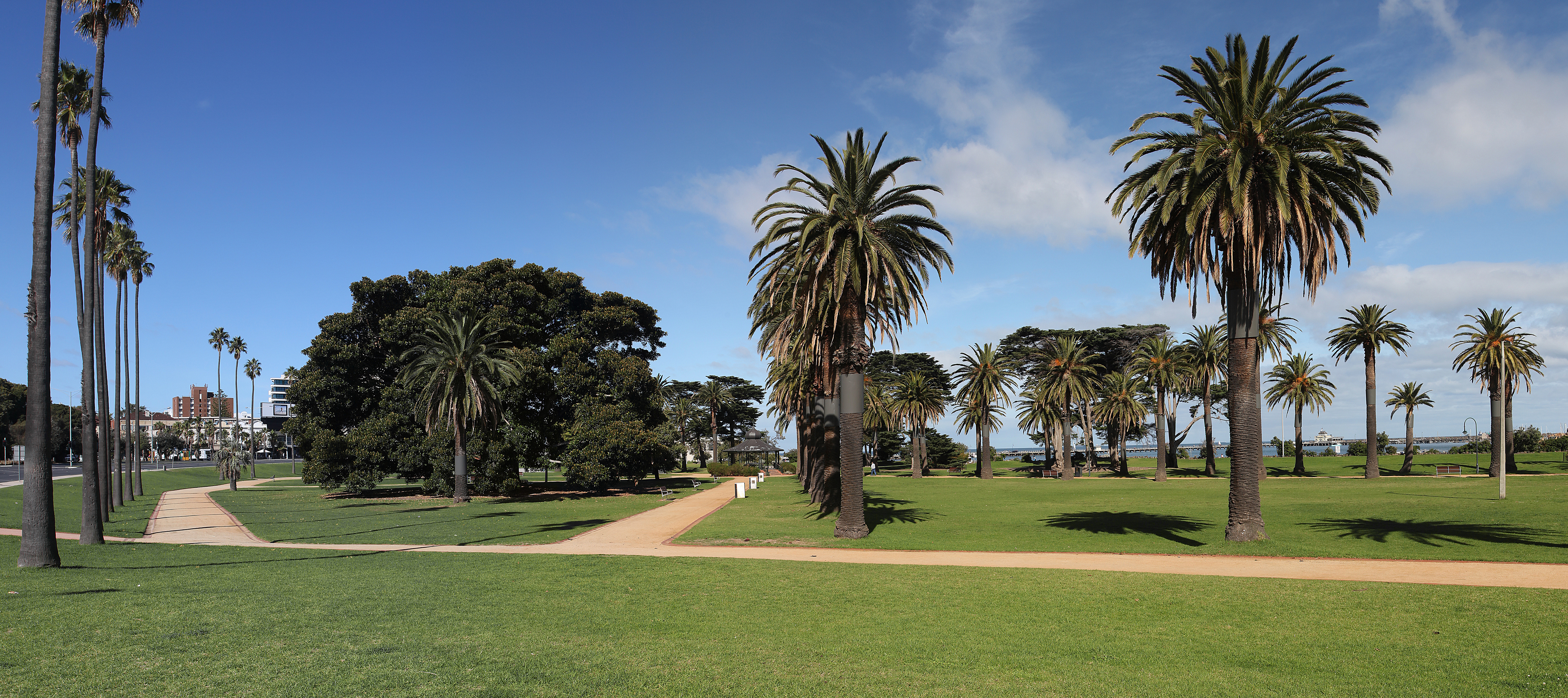
Catani Gardens near the St Kilda Pier

St Kilda is known for its many parks and gardens, many featuring combinations of the predominant Canary Island date palms, which are synonymous with the area and Californian fan palms. Some of the gardens include St Kilda Botanic Gardens on Blessington Street, which has heritage features and gates, a conservatory, rose garden, lake and a sustainable Eco Centre building. The gardens were once surrounded by mansions, but were subject to unit development in the 1960s. The St Kilda Foreshore and Catani Arch are on Jacka Boulevard, while the upper Esplanade reserve where the Sunday markets are held features the Catani Clock Tower, heritage toilets and vaults. The Catani Gardens which sit between the foreshore, Beaconsfield Parade and the Esplanade includes a War Memorial, Captain Cook statue and Royal Melbourne Yacht Squadron Buildings. O'Donnell Gardens is adjacent to Luna Park on Acland Street and features an art-deco monument and tall palms. Alfred Square on the upper Esplanade has numerous war memorials, which include the South African War Memorial (1905) listed on the Victorian Heritage Register. Albert Park is a large park which spans many suburbs, including St Kilda on Fitzroy Street and hosts a number of sporting fields and a recreational lake. The St Kilda Town Hall features a small public Victorian garden facing the corner of Brighton Road and Carlisle Street.

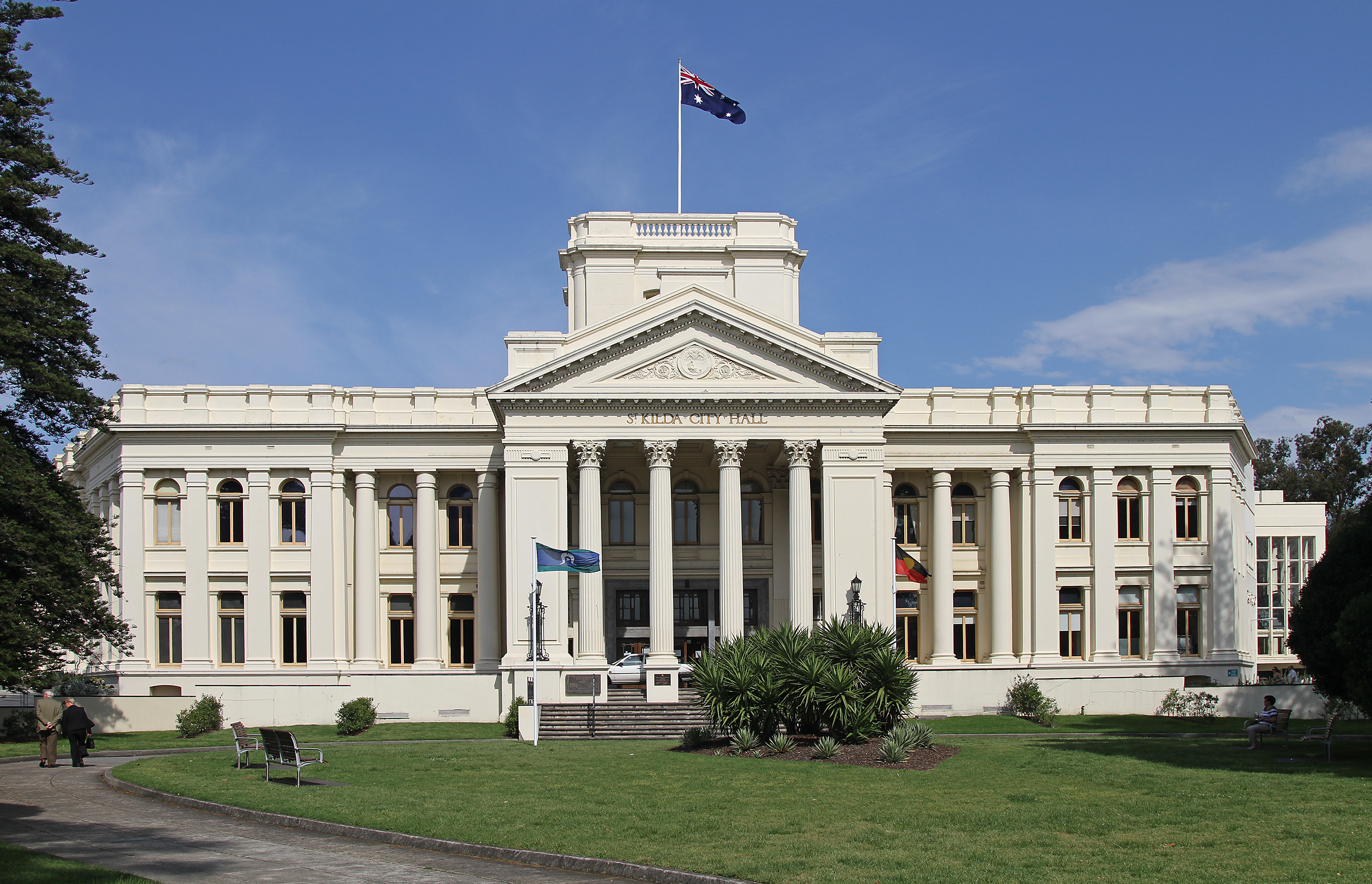
The St Kilda Town Hall and its Victorian public gardens

St Kilda is also home to one of Melbourne's few remaining Indigenous Australian landmarks, the Corroboree Tree. The red gum eucalyptus, estimated at being between four and seven hundred years old, is located next to Queens Road, close to the junction with Fitzroy Street. A plaque close to its base reads "Aboriginals of early settlement days congregated and held their ceremonies under and in the vicinity of this tree". These ceremonies celebrated important events, told traditional stories and promoted unity between communities, and are commonly known by the generic term corroboree, or ngargee in the local language. The site continued to be used, both for ceremonial purposes and as a fringe camp, for some years after British settlement in 1835, as is evidenced by Jacob Miller who told his son how he had witnessed the remnant Kulin population "perform their dancing about the old tree" after moving into the area during the 1850s.

The "Veg Out" Community Gardens, at the former St Kilda Bowling Club in the Peanut Farm reserve, form another public garden. The gardens are primarily rented by residents of apartments in the area and offer local residents the opportunity to express themselves in a small plot of dirt, which results in many colourful artistic displays.

== Education and schools ==
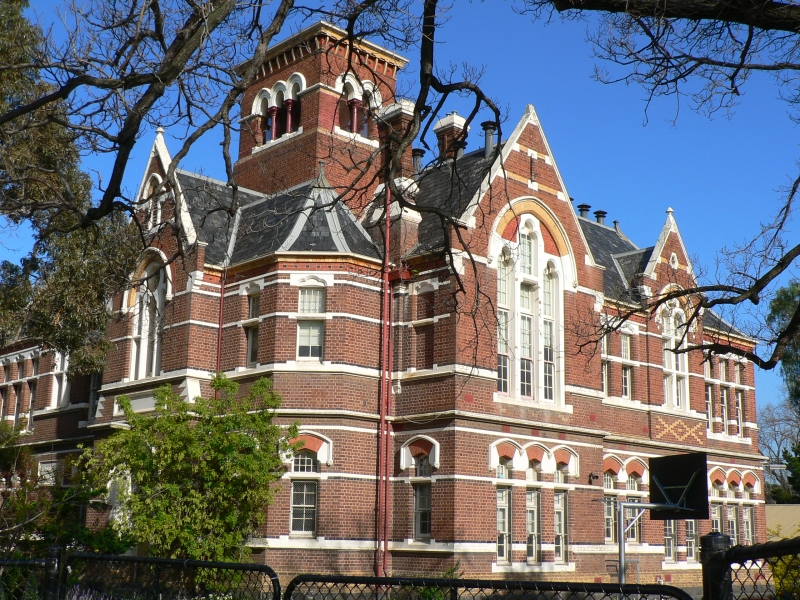
St Kilda Park Primary School building

St Kilda is home to several schools, including secondary schools St Michael's Grammar School, St Mary's College and primary schools St Kilda Primary School (on Brighton Road) and St Kilda Park Primary School (on Fitzroy Street) all of which have imposing heritage buildings on campus.

Former schools include

- Collegiate School, St Kilda (1854–1858) on Burnett Street. Headmaster was C. A. Goslett, later barrister-at-law. The building remained a popular subject for illustrations for another 20 years.
- St Kilda Grammar (1856–1893) on Carlile Street, later "Marlton", Wellington Street, finally "Lansmere", Dandenong Road. Headmasters include William C. Northcote, E. L. Backhouse. It was absorbed by Hawksburn Grammar School (1893–1898).

== In popular culture ==
St Kilda has featured prominently in television. The Network Ten drama The Secret Life Of Us, which ran from 2001 to 2005, was set in St Kilda, mostly around Acland Street, Fitzroy Street and in the Esplanade Hotel. The main characters were often depicted playing social games of soccer in Catani Gardens and social lawn bowls at St Kilda bowls club, both of which have since become local traditions. The show featured a fictional pub called the Foo Bar which was often sought after by tourists but did not actually exist. The popularity of the name later inspired a real licensed venue in nearby beachside Brighton. St Kilda was also the venue for My Restaurant Rules 2004 series, with the Melbourne restaurant "Seven Stones".

Many of Paul Kelly's songs feature St Kilda, including "From St Kilda to Kings Cross" from the album Post which included the lyric "I'd give you all of Sydney Harbour (all that land, all that water) For that one sweet promenade", in reference to the St Kilda Esplanade. The area also featured in songs such as "Killed her in St Kilda" by Voodoo Lovecats, "St Kilda Nights" by Purple Dentists and "Melodies of St Kilda" by Masters Apprentices. In the early 1990s inner-city "supergroup" Hell to Pay released the song "Saints and Kings", which featured the line "Ain't too many Saints in St Kilda".

Many movies and video clips have been filmed in St Kilda, including indoor scenes from The Story of the Kelly Gang, the beach scenes of the 2005 hit Bollywood film Salaam Namaste and the 2006 film Kenny which in particular features the St Kilda Festival.

Australian rock band Hunters & Collectors filmed many of their video clips in St Kilda in the 1980s; of particular note is "Talking to a Stranger" which used the old St Kilda railway station, "Say Goodbye", parts of which were filmed upstairs at the George Hotel and "Do you see what I see?" which was partly filmed on a train running along the Sandringham line passed parts of St Kilda East, Balaclava and Ripponlea. Other musicians to film in the area include Eran James' clip "Touched by Love" which has backdrops including the Palais Theatre and St Kilda Pier and Something for Kate, whose clip "The Futurist" was filmed at St Kilda West pier. The Australian rock band The Cat Empire exclaimed in song, "We're gonna sleep on the St Ki-i-lda sands" in their song "The Crowd".

St Kilda is also the residence of the fictional character The Honourable Phryne Fisher from author Kerry Greenwood's series of Phryne Fisher detective novels, which have been made into a television series called Miss Fisher's Murder Mysteries.

The suburb of Saint Kilda in Dunedin, New Zealand, was named after Melbourne's St Kilda by early property developer (and former Melburnian) George Scott.

St Kilda is the setting for the Sam Feldt & Bloombox remix videoclip of "On Trees and Birds and Fire" by the Dutch folk band I Am Oak.

The St Kilda Film Festival is the setting for an incident in the novel Airside by Christopher Priest. During this a basement auditorium is flooded during a tropical storm and several people are killed.

== Transport ==
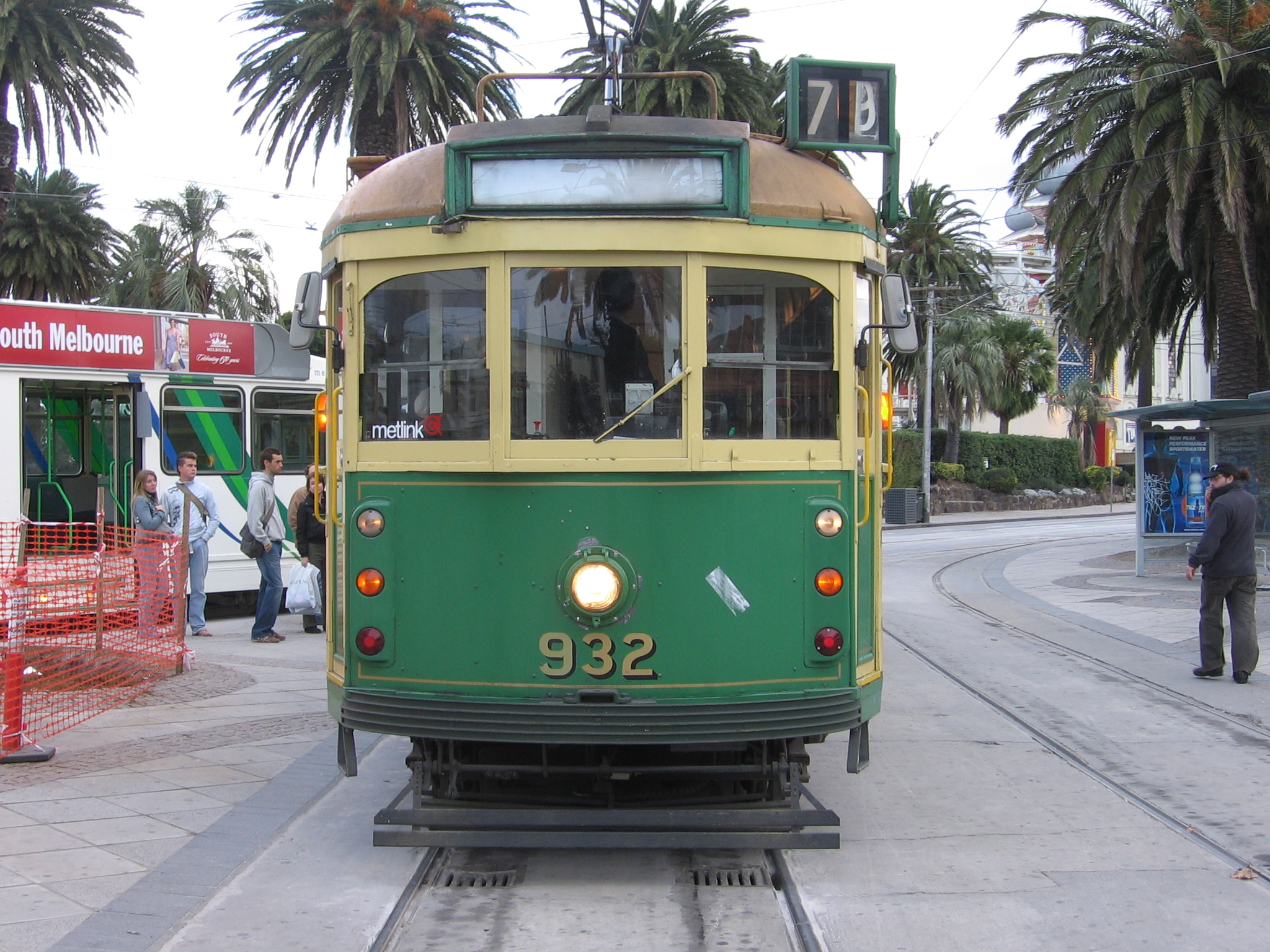
Trams at the Acland Street junction in 2005

St Kilda is well connected to the Melbourne central business district by trams and a dedicated light rail line along the former St Kilda railway.

St Kilda is served by tram routes 12 from Collins Street, 16 from Swanston Street, and 96 from Bourke Street. all routes are around 25 minutes from the city.

St Kilda also has water transport in the form of ferries and private boating. Williamstown Ferries operates a regular ferry service running primarily between St Kilda and Williamstown as well as operating services with to the Melbourne CBD with drop-off points at major tourist attractions which departs from St Kilda Pier. Royal Melbourne Yacht Squadron has a building at St Kilda harbour, which has berths for boats and yachts and the Squadron also operates the St Kilda Marina on Marine Parade, one of the first marinas in Melbourne.

The Bayside Trail off-road bicycle network connects through St Kilda with an additional Copenhagen-style bicycle lane running along Fitzroy Street connecting Albert Park Reserve to the foreshore.

== Missing person cases ==
Three separate and prominent unsolved missing persons cases are associated with St Kilda. Linda Stilwell was a 7-year-old girl who was abducted on 10 August 1968 from St Kilda Beach. The prime suspect is Derek Percy, who has also been named by police as a suspect in the Wanda Beach Murders and in the disappearance of the Beaumont children.

Adele Bailey was a 23-year-old trans woman who disappeared from St Kilda in September 1978. Her remains were found in 1995 in a disused mineshaft near Bonnie Doon.

Louise and Charmian Faulkner also vanished from outside their Acland Street flat on 26 April 1980 after getting into a ute driven by an older Australian male.

== Notable residents ==
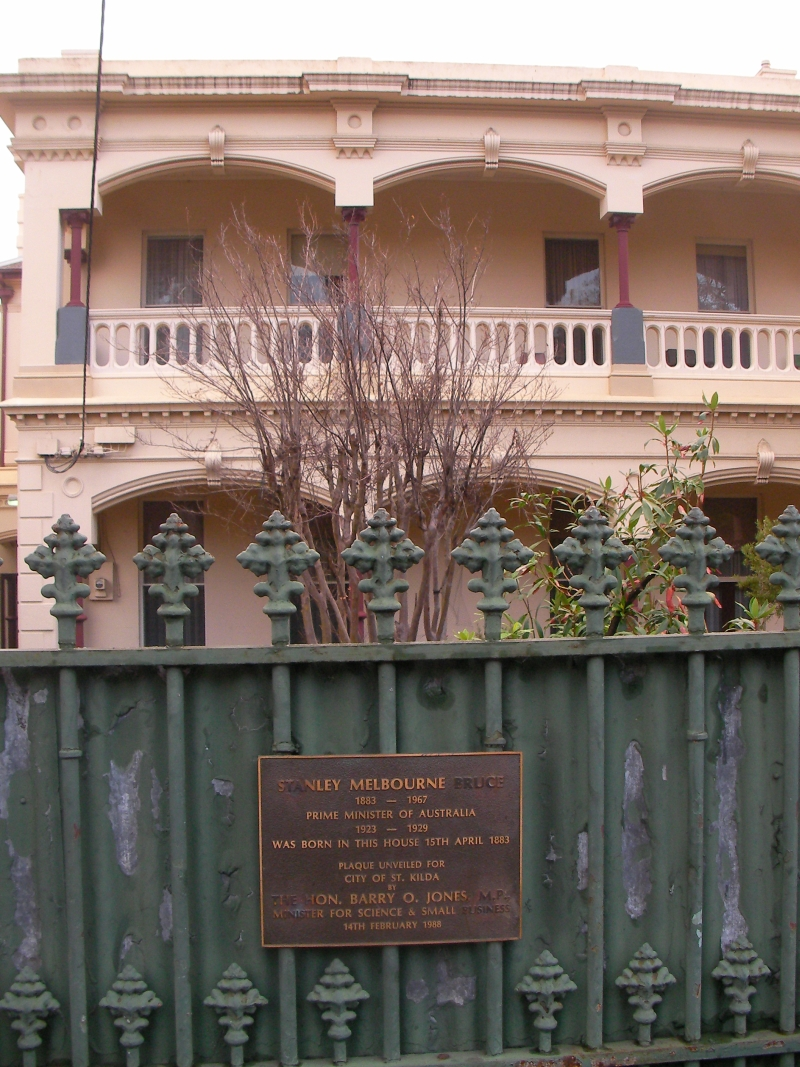
Plaque signifying the home on Grey Street in which former Prime Minister Stanley Melbourne Bruce was born in 1883

Architects

- John James Clark (died at his residence in 1915)
- Sir Bernard Evans (moved from England in 1913 and was schooled there)
- William Pitt (1855-1880s)

Entertainers

- Paul Dawber: actor, Neighbours, Sons & Daughters, The Novelist.
- Dub FX - musician and street performer
- Sheila Florance - actress, until 1991
- Rachel Griffiths - actress
- Jessica Jacobs - actress, Saddle Club series 2
- Chris Lilley - actor and musician
- Trevor Marmalade - comedian
- Margot Robbie - actress
- John Safran - media personality
- Magda Szubanski - comedian and actress
- Zbych Trofimiuk - actor
- Charlie Vickers- Actor

Musicians

- AC/DC (1973–1975)
- Adam Briggs—better known by his performing name, "Briggs" (early 2000s)
- Rowland S. Howard (1970s; 1993–2009)
- Fred Negro
- Renee Geyer - singer
- Mark Seymour (1970s–2005)

Politicians

- Henry Bailey (lived on Alma Road for many years and died there)
- Stanley Bruce - 8th Prime Minister of Australia (born 1883, but moved in 1885)
- William Deane - 22nd Governor General of Australia
- Albert Jacka VC - 1st AIF Army officer and former Mayor of St Kilda
- Josh Burns - Australian Labor Party member for the division of Macnamara

Sportspeople

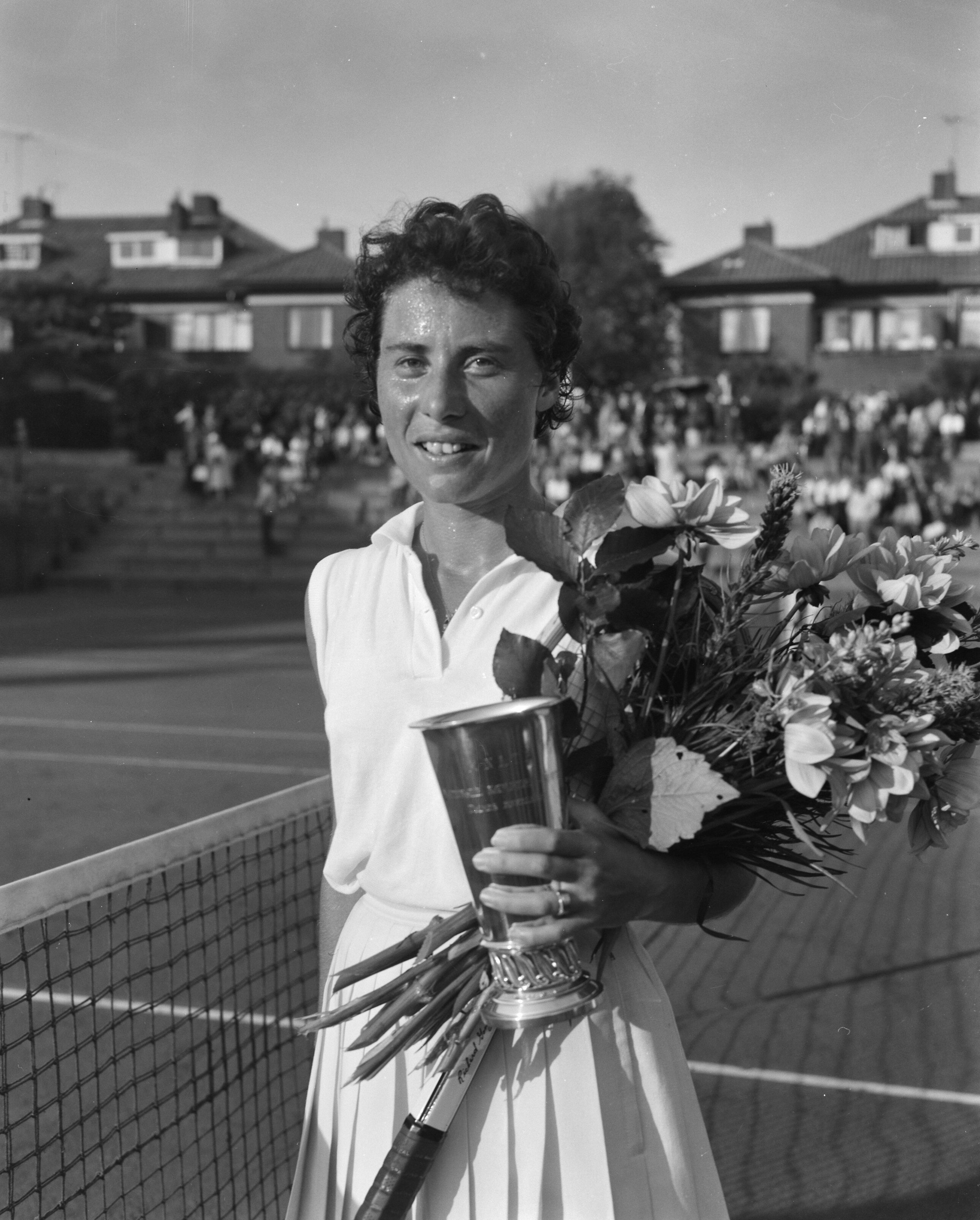
Eva Duldig

- Ron Barassi (Australian rules footballer; lived there from the late 1970s to 2023)
- Brian Dixon, Australian rules footballer
- Eva Duldig (born 1938), Austrian-born Australian and Dutch tennis player, author
- Michael Klim, swimmer
- Frederick McEvoy British winter Olympian who won bobsleigh bronze at the 1936 Winter Olympics in Germany.
- Mal Michael (2007–), Australian rules footballer
- Sir Hubert Opperman "Oppy" (cyclist; lived at Edgewater Towers from the day it opened in 1961 until he moved to retirement village)
- Jim Stynes (Australian rules footballer, lived there until his death in 2012)
- Timana Tahu, rugby league and rugby union footballer

Visual artists

- Rupert Bunny (born in St Kilda in 1864)
- Marcus Clarke (lived at 49 Robe Street in the 1870s)
- Karl Duldig (1902–1986), Austrian-Australian sculptor
- Joy Hester (lived at 47 Robe Street between 1944 and 1946)
- Mirka Mora (lived at Tolarno mid-1960s)
- Sidney Nolan (between 1917 and 1931)
- Albert Tucker (lived at 47 Robe Street between 1944 and 1946)

Writers

- Louis Lavater - poet who spent his whole life in St Kilda from birth (2 March 1867) to death (22 May 1953)
- Morris West - author of The Devil's Advocate (1959)

Other

- Jim McNeil - violent criminal and 'Prison Playwright'; subject of book The Laughing Bandit
- Dr Bertram Wainer

== See also ==
- City of St Kilda – St Kilda was previously within this former local government area.
