= St Kilda Junction =

Road intersection in St Kilda, Australia

Coordinates: 37.855°S 144.982°E

- Street art precinct
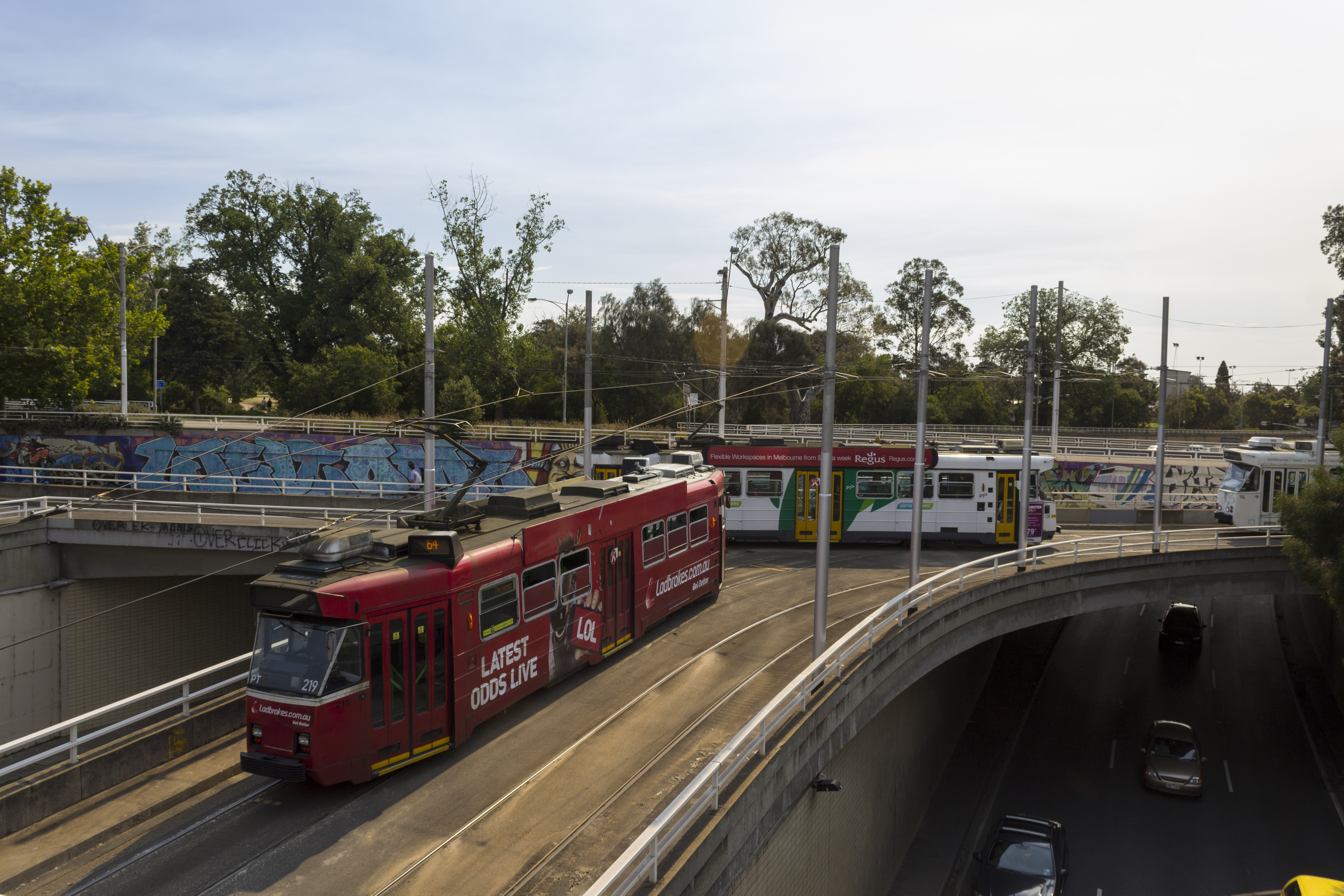
- Tram junction at the centre of St Kilda Junction

Location
- Melbourne, Victoria, Australia
- Roads at junction: St Kilda Road; Punt Road; Queens Way; Nelson Street; Barkly Street; Fitzroy Street

Construction
- Type: Traffic circle
- Maintained by: Department of Transport

St Kilda Junction is a major intersection in Melbourne, Australia. It is in the suburb of St Kilda, bordering Windsor and St Kilda East, and is the meeting point of the major roads Punt Road, St Kilda Road, Dandenong Road/Queens Way/Princes Highway and Fitzroy Street.

== History ==
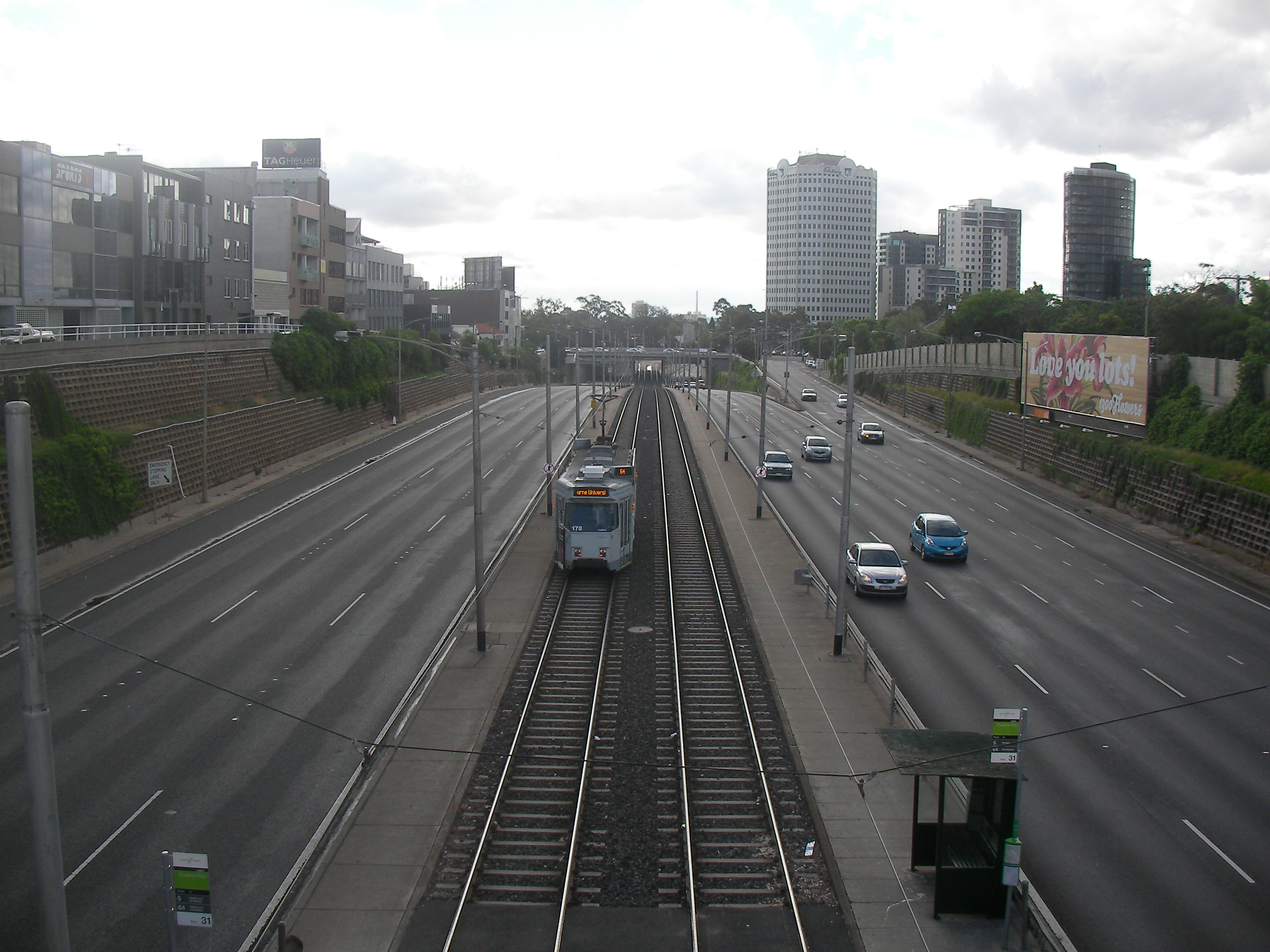
Dandenong Road in 2009, looking west toward St Kilda Junction

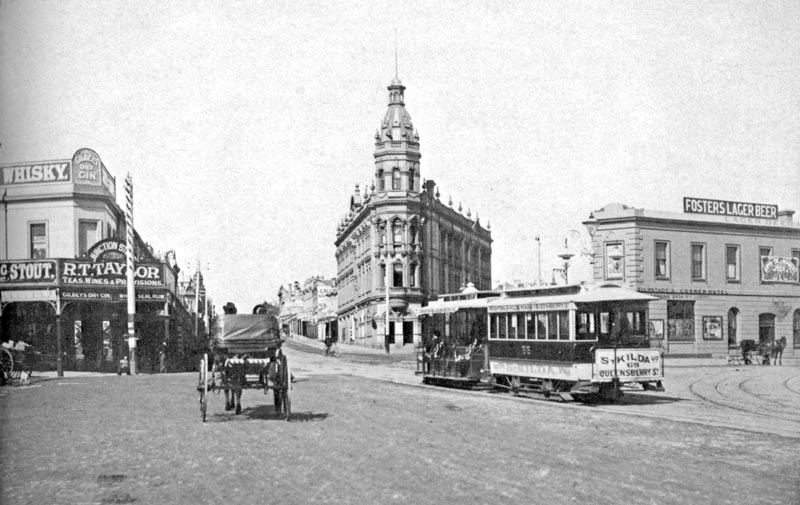
St Kilda Junction looking south before widening, with High Street (now St Kilda Road) to the left and Barkly Street to the right. In the centre is the Junction Hotel.

Up until 1966, St Kilda Junction, along with the Haymarket roundabout on Royal Parade, was one of two giant roundabouts with trams running through the middle.

Before 1966, St Kilda Junction was the intersection of eight streets. They were, listed clockwise and starting from the north (with the route numbers of the time shown):

- Punt Road (State Route 29)
- Nelson Street
- Wellington Street (National Route 1), with trams
- High Street (State Route 3), with trams
- Barkly Street (State Route 29)
- Fitzroy Street, with trams
- Queens Road
- St Kilda Road (National Route 1 / State Route 3), with trams

The intersection took the form of a large oval roundabout with another road link in the middle between the close edges. The trams from St Kilda Road traversed most of the intersection before splitting into three paths. Things were made all the more difficult by the fact that Queens Road joined the intersection at the point where the western service road of St Kilda Road left it.

In the late 1960s, the Bolte Government proposed plans for a major overhaul of the intersection, which ultimately led to its existing form.

Queens Road was rerouted slightly so it would enter the roundabout in the middle of its long side. It was then lowered, so that it passed under the intersection, to join a new street, Queens Way, which led into Dandenong Road (as Wellington Street had done before it.) Wellington Street's tram service was also re-directed along Queens Way. National Route 1 (or Alternate National Route 1, as it became when the Monash Freeway was built) was rerouted down Queens Road-Queens Way-Dandenong Road because it was much easier for traffic to pass the junction that way than from St Kilda Road. High Street was widened and became the southern part of St Kilda Road.

Road traffic could then pass through the junction on the major thoroughfares more easily, in most cases, but was unable to do so in others. For example, vehicles heading west could no longer go from Queens Way to Punt Road. Instead, they had to proceed to the first right turn on Queens Road (Union Street) to get access to St Kilda Road or Punt Road. Over one hundred and fifty houses, forty-two shops and fifty-two business, along with other premises, were demolished as part of the project.

The trams were also realigned. The tramline was lowered to halfway between the first and second levels in the centre of the junction, with trams then able to reascend and continue down St Kilda Road or turn into Fitzroy Street, or descend further and turn into Queens Way. Overall, the area of junction expanded, taking in the points of intersection of all original streets, the junction now encompassing twelve streets. The tram line once diverted around the old Junction Hotel, which remained standing on its own for some time before it was eventually demolished, and the land became part of the median strip. The bridge designs for that work were undertaken by Melbourne engineer Bruce Day.

St Kilda Junction is also the location of one of Melbourne's well-loved suburban football/cricket ovals, the St Kilda Cricket Ground, which is generally known as the Junction Oval. Some of the parkland surrounding the Junction Oval was lost to the Queens Road realignment, but the original oval and the historic Aboriginal Corroboree tree remained intact.

In 2014, a move was made to return the St Kilda Football Club operations and training to Junction Oval with Cricket Victoria and Government assistance.

In October 2014, the St Kilda Junction Area Action Group (JaagStKilda.com) successfully lobbied VicRoads and the State Government to improve the unsafe and unfriendly pedestrian underpass, by installing improved lighting and giving the area a major clean-up. However, due to its car-centric design, significant problems remain at the junction for pedestrians, cyclists, and those using the tram and bus stops.

During July 2019 the tramline through the junction was shut down for rebuilding, during which the turnouts between St Kilda Rd and Fitzroy St were shifted north about 90 metres with gauntlet track for the intermediate distance. While space could not be made for a third track, as has been provided at many other junctions, the new design allows trams to travel (slightly) faster through the intersection.

== Trams ==
The following tram routes pass through St Kilda Junction:

Heading North:

- to Melbourne University
- to Melbourne University
- to Melbourne University
- to Melbourne University
- to Melbourne University

Heading West:

- to Kew

Heading South:

- to Malvern East
- to Carnegie

Heading East:

- to Malvern
- to Brighton East
