= St Kilda Festival =

Annual event in Victoria, Australia

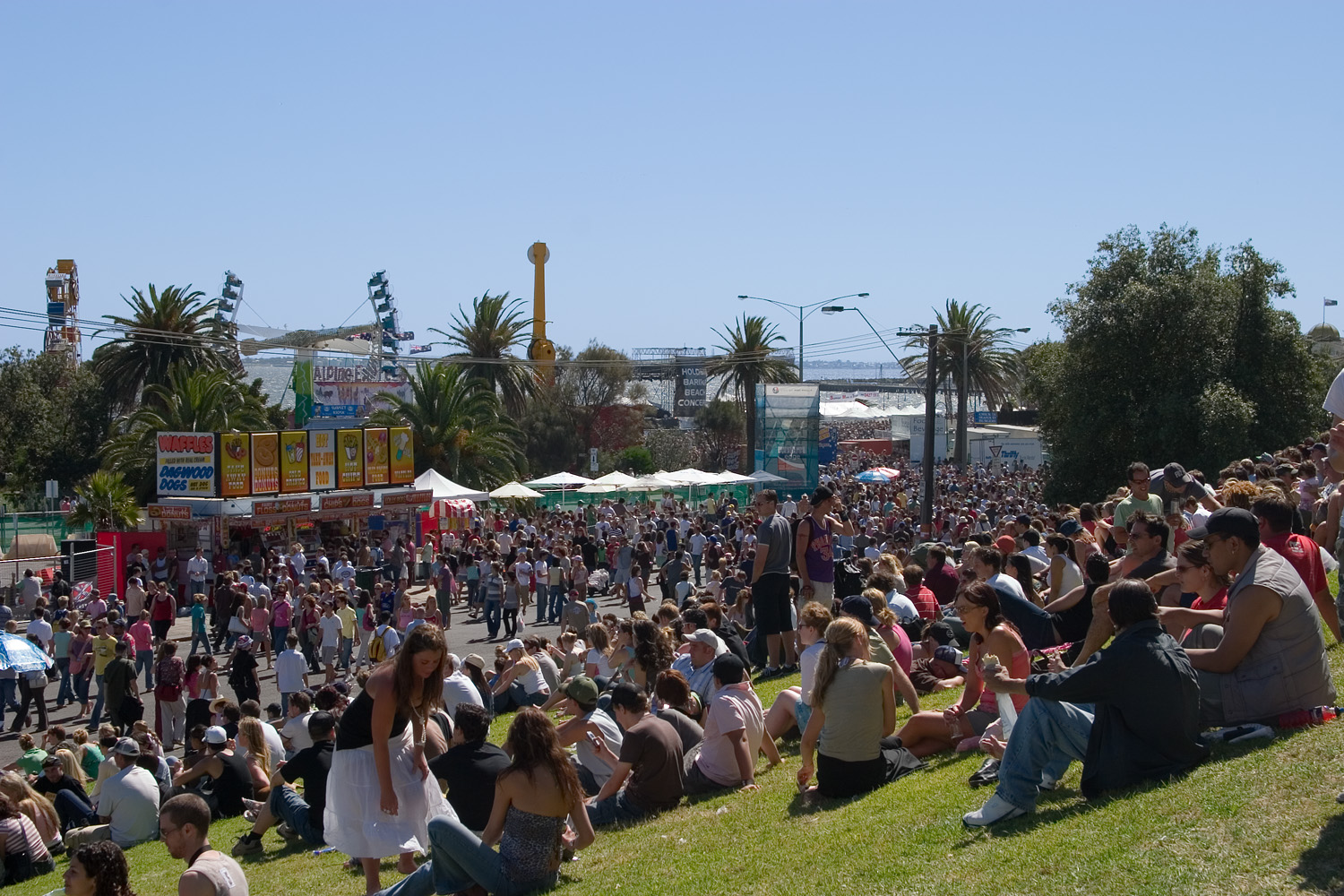
- Genre: Various
- Dates: February
- Locations: St Kilda, Victoria, Australia
- Years active: 1980–2020, 2022–present
- Website: stkildafestival.com.au

St Kilda Festival is an annual two-day community event held in St Kilda, Victoria, Australia. It is regarded as one of the country's largest free festivals, featuring live music performances, cultural activities, and entertainment along the St Kilda foreshore. The festival typically takes place held every February (except 2021) and attracts significant attendance from both local residents and visitors.

== Background ==
The event was first held in 1980 and has since grown into a major cultural celebration. Its primary focus is on showcasing Australian talent, including established and emerging musicians, while promoting community engagement and participation. The festival program often includes multiple stages for live music, family-friendly activities, food and market stalls, and recreational events.

St Kilda Festival is organised with the aim of supporting local artists and fostering a sense of community spirit. Over the years, it has become an iconic part of Melbourne's cultural calendar, drawing crowds that often exceed hundreds of thousands. The location along the St Kilda foreshore provides a distinctive setting, combining urban and coastal elements.

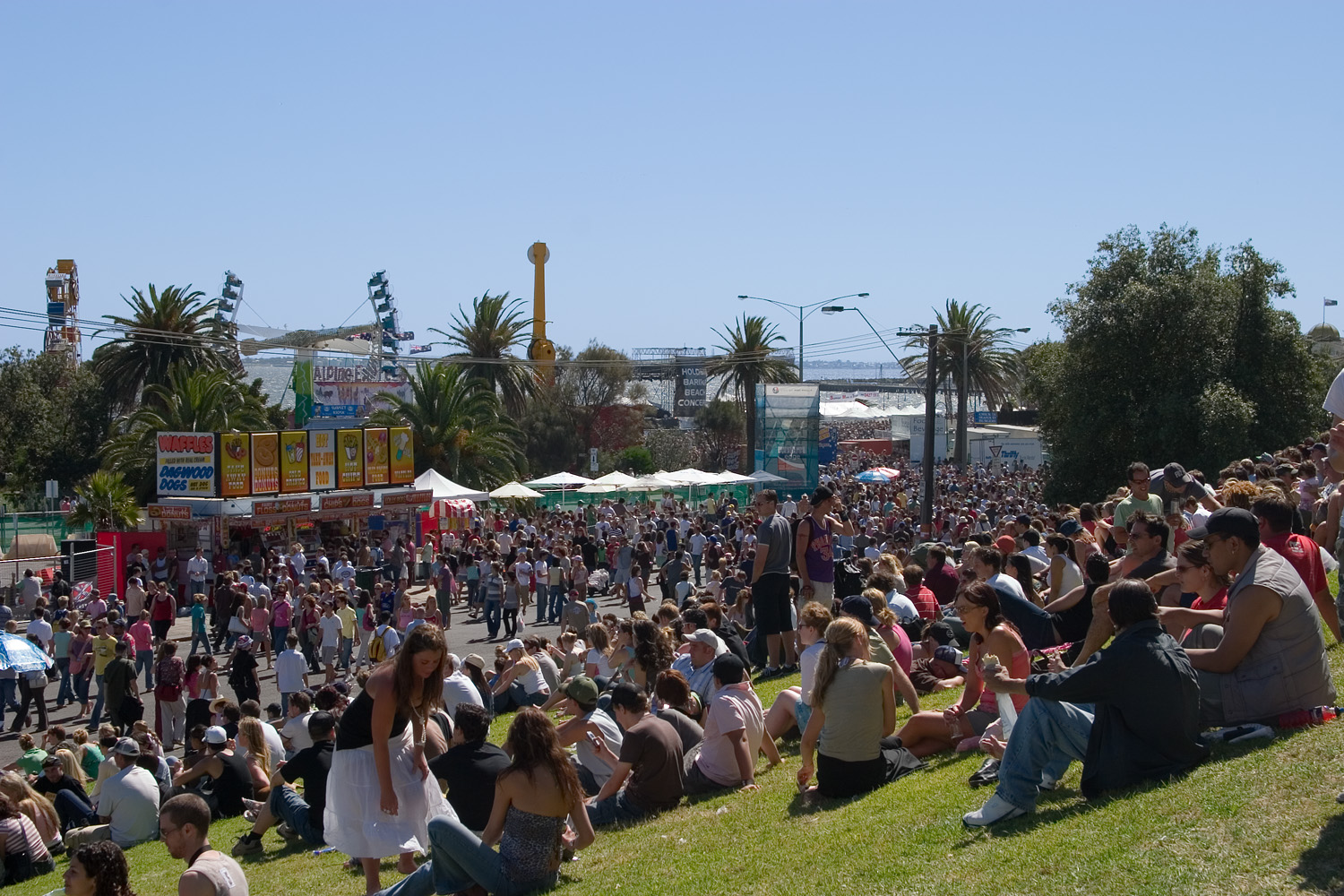
The St Kilda Festival in 2005

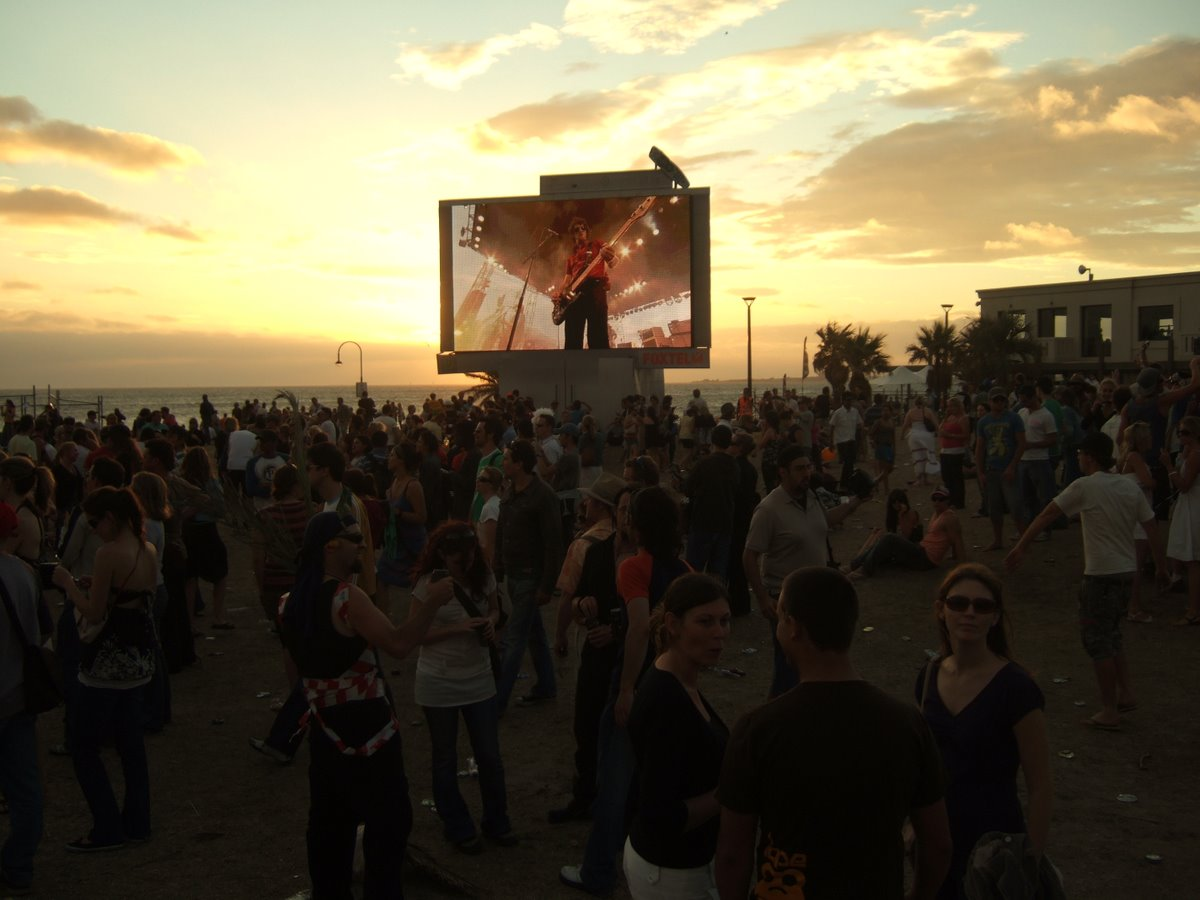
Dallas Crane playing live on the beach in 2007.

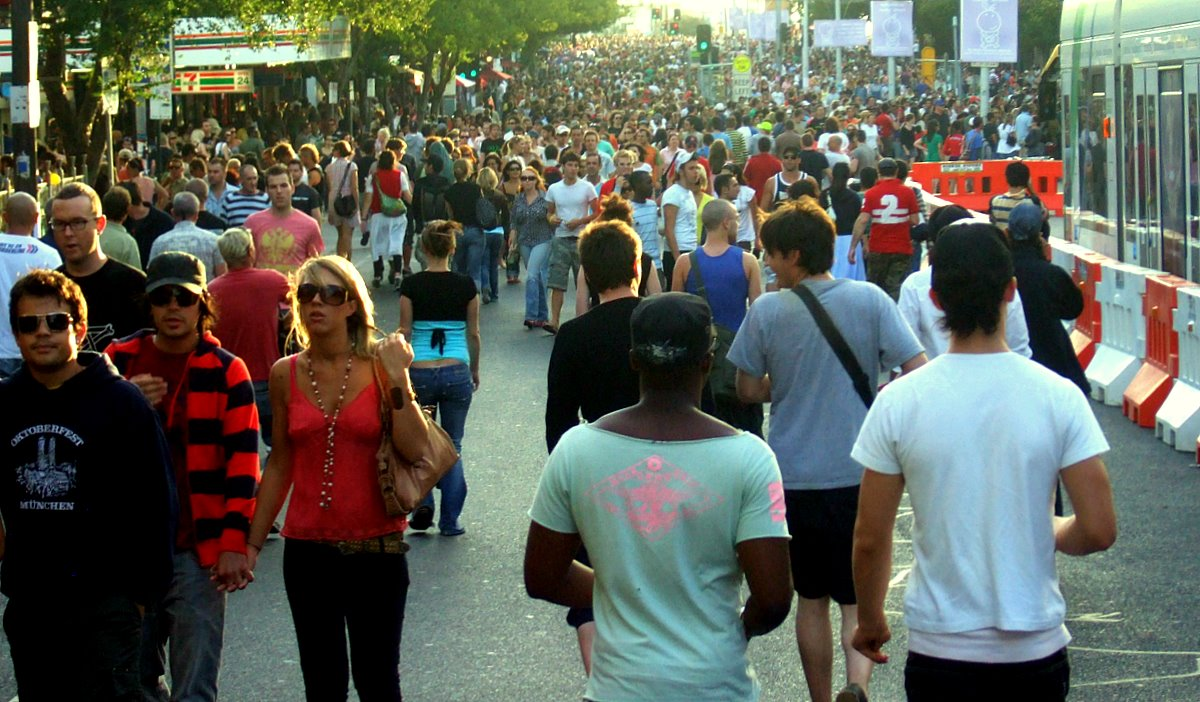
Crowds on Fitzroy St during the 2007 festival.
