= Prince of Wales Hotel (Melbourne) =

Building in Melbourne, Victoria, Australia

Coordinates: 37°51′44″S 144°58′27″E

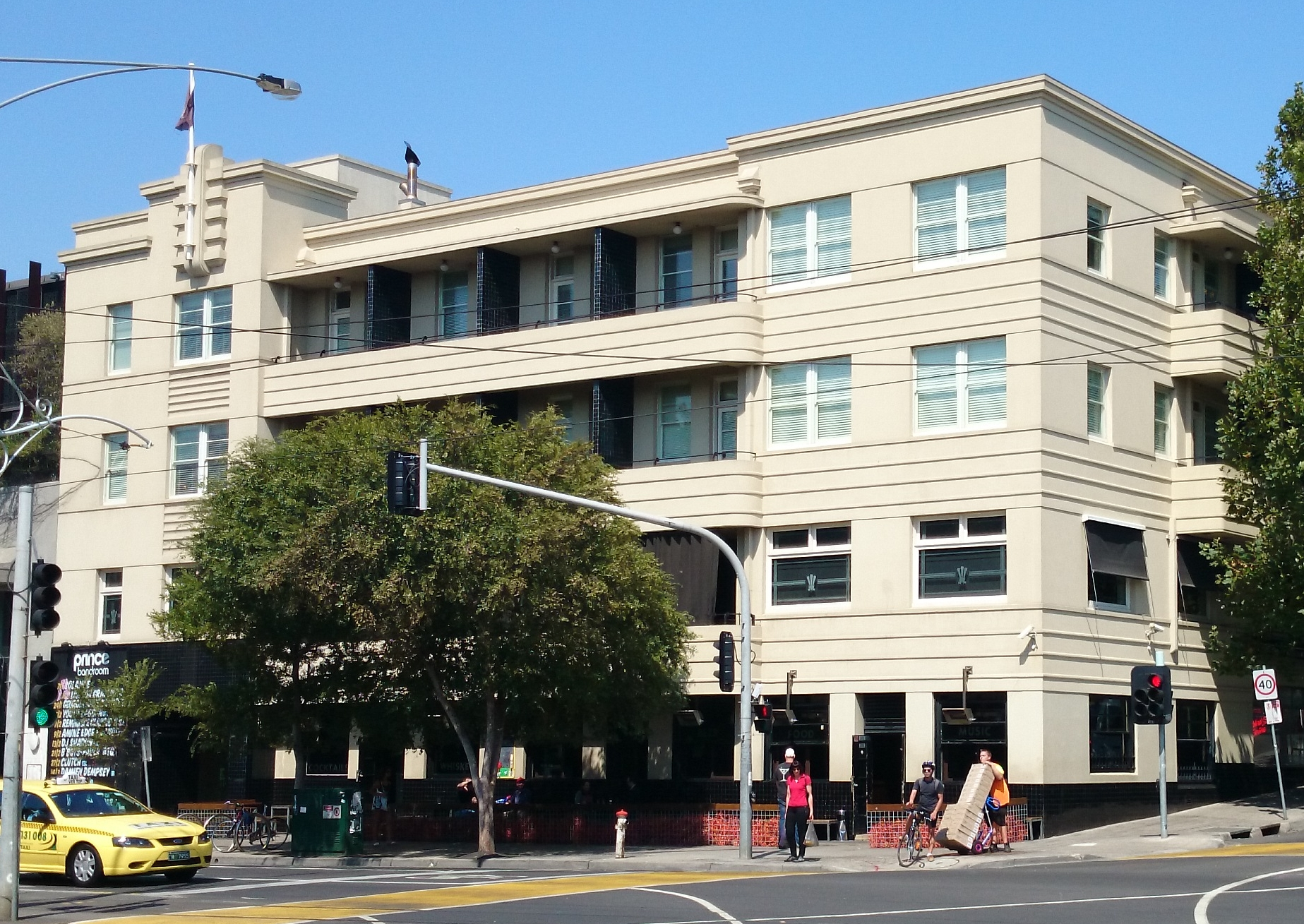

General information
- Location: 29 Fitzroy Street, St Kilda, Victoria, Australia

The Prince of Wales Hotel is a hotel and music venue located at 29 Fitzroy Street in St Kilda, an inner bayside suburb of Melbourne, Victoria, Australia. Established as a two storey residential hotel in 1862, it was rebuilt in an Art Deco style in 1937 as a much larger venue, with two bars at ground level and three floors of residential hotel above. During World War II, the hotel housed an officers club for the United States military forces stationed in Melbourne under General Douglas MacArthur.

The smaller bar attracted a homosexual clientele possibly from its opening, and was Victoria's oldest surviving gay bar until a renovation in 2020. An extension in the 1970s added a carpark to the rear and an expanded first floor including a large function space, later known as the Bandroom.

From the late 1970s, alongside other St Kilda venues, namely the Crystal Ballroom and the Esplanade Hotel, the Prince Bandroom became a hub of punk rock and other forms of alternative music. In the same period, Sunday nights featured an elaborate drag show called Pokies, which ran until 1992. Sold in 1996, the exterior was renovated and the upper floors revamped as a boutique hotel and fine dining restaurant, while retaining the Bandroom. A new first floor verandah over the footpath was added to the 70s extension in 1999, and the bars were combined into one large space in 2020.

== List of notable musical performances ==
Well-known acts that have performed there include:

- ...And You Will Know Us by the Trail of Dead
- Animal Collective
- Aphex Twin
- Babes in Toyland
- Beasts of Bourbon
- Beck
- Behemoth
- The Black Keys
- Bone Thugs-n-Harmony
- Bored!
- The Breeders
- Bright Eyes
- Buzzcocks
- Celtic Frost
- Charli XCX
- Cosmic Psychos
- Cut Copy
- Current Joys
- Death Grips
- Die Antwoord
- The Dillinger Escape Plan
- Dinosaur Jr.
- DJ Shadow
- Doja Cat
- Eddy Current Suppression Ring
- Elastica
- Fear Factory
- Fleet Foxes
- Four Tet
- Hatebreed
- Helmet
- Hole
- Rowland S. Howard
- Daniel Johnston
- Kaiser Chiefs
- King Gizzard and the Lizard Wizard
- Lubricated Goat
- The Mark of Cain
- Modest Mouse
- Mogwai
- My Bloody Valentine
- Napalm Death
- Nico
- NOFX
- Nomeansno
- Obituary
- Pavement
- Placebo
- Queens of the Stone Age
- Queensrÿche
- Rancid
- Refused
- Regurgitator
- RZA
- The Scientists
- Smashing Pumpkins
- Sonic Youth
- Spiderbait
- Spiritualized
- Stereolab
- Teenage Fanclub
- Tricky
- Tumbleweed
- Uriah Heep
- Vampire Weekend
- Veruca Salt
- Ween
- Yo La Tengo
- You Am I
- Yung Lean

== See also ==
- Music of Melbourne
