= St Kilda West =

- Suburb
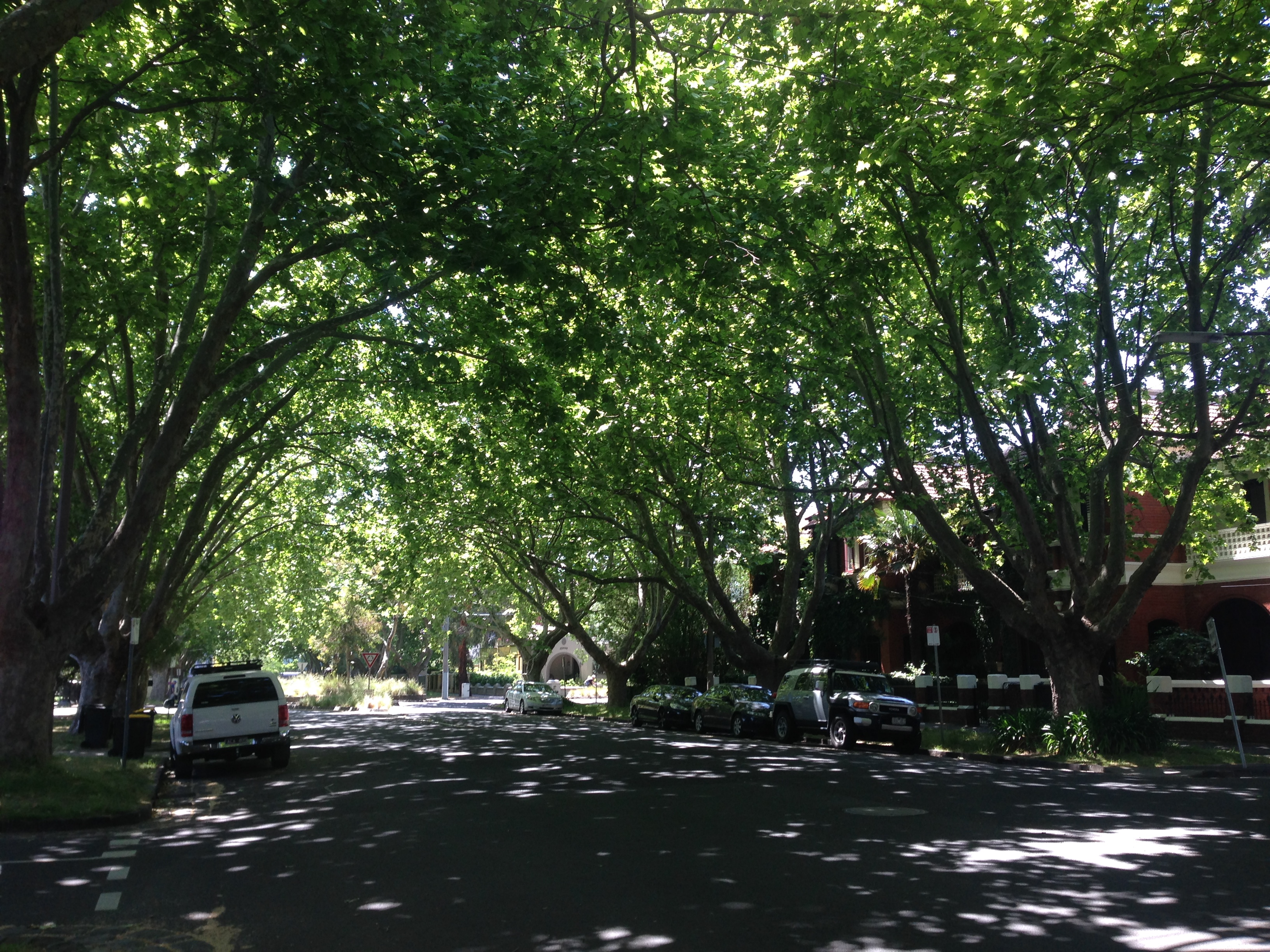
- Mary Street, St Kilda West

- Interactive map of St Kilda West
- Coordinates: 37.8604°S 144.9732°E
- Country: Australia
- State: Victoria
- City: Melbourne
- LGA: City of Port Phillip
- Location: 5 km (3.1 mi) from Melbourne CBD

Government
  - State electorate: Albert Park
  - Federal division: Macnamara

Area
  - Total: 0.48 km^{2} (0.19 sq mi)
- Elevation: 11 m (36 ft)

Population
  - Total: 2,951 (2021 census)
  - Density: 6,150/km^{2} (15,920/sq mi)
- Postcode: 3182
Suburbs around St Kilda West
Middle Park	Albert Park	St Kilda
Port Phillip	St Kilda West	St Kilda
St Kilda	St Kilda	St Kilda

St Kilda West is an inner suburb in Melbourne, Victoria, Australia, 5 km south of Melbourne's Central Business District, located within the City of Port Phillip local government area. St Kilda West recorded a population of 2,951 at the 2021 census.

St Kilda West is bounded by Albert Park and Canterbury Road in the north-east and south-east, West Beach Road, Scoops Lane and Beaconsfield Parade in the south-west, Port Phillip Bay in the west, and Fraser Street in the north and north-west. Fraser Street was the western boundary of the former City of St Kilda, now part of the City of Port Phillip.

It is an almost exclusively residential area characterised by a mix of Victorian terraces, modest Edwardian villas, interwar and post war walk-up flats, as well as some 1960s-70s hi-rise towers facing Port Phillip bay. The suburb's community and commercial facilities (including schools and shops) are located in nearby suburbs, and it is well served by public transport.

== History ==
The area of St Kilda West was formerly part of a large swamp which included what is now Middle Park, which was drained in the early 1870s, and streets laid out in regular grid plan, subdivided in stages, but only built in sparsely at first. Wider tree lined boulevards were planned for Mary Street and Park Street. Similar to the rest of St Kilda, by the 1890s large terrace houses and large villas had been built along Beaconsfield Parade, Park Street and Mary Street. In the Edwardian era, some terraces were built, but the remaining areas further away from the beach and Fitzroy Street filled up with modest red brick houses, the same type that was quickly filling Middle Park. At the same time, like the rest of St Kilda some of the larger mansions and terraces became guest houses. The Catani Gardens on the beachfront were developed as part of the Edwardian beautification of the foreshore.

St Kilda West Post Office opened around March 1879 (from 1886 until 1970 it was known as St Kilda Railway Station office).

The St Kilda railway line, Melbourne's second which opened in 1857, ran along the northern edge of the area, terminating at the northeast corner at Fitzroy Street. Cable trams were built along that street in the 1880s, which was electrified in the 1920s. A new electric tram line from the city was built through Middle Park along Park Street, which opened on 31 October 1925. It originally turned south at Mary Street, then ran along Beaconsfield Parade to terminate at Fitzroy Street. On 8 November 1959 the track was straightened in favour of a short extension along Park Street to Fitzroy Street, now the terminus of Route 12.

Beginning just before World War I with the construction of the Canterbury in 1914, flats began to be built in the still vacant lots in St Kilda West, sometimes replacing earlier houses. This trend continued in the post-war period, including a number of high rise apartment towers on Beaconsfield Parade and on Canterbury Road.

By the 1980s the majority of St Kilda West had become a heritage precinct, and so there has been little redevelopment since. One notable change was the sale of the railway reservation along the other side Canterbury Road which was sold off in the 1990s, and developed as a row of townhouses.

== Landmarks ==
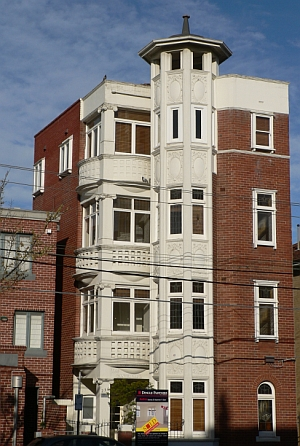
The Canterbury Flats, heritage listed apartment building was the earliest built in Melbourne's suburbs

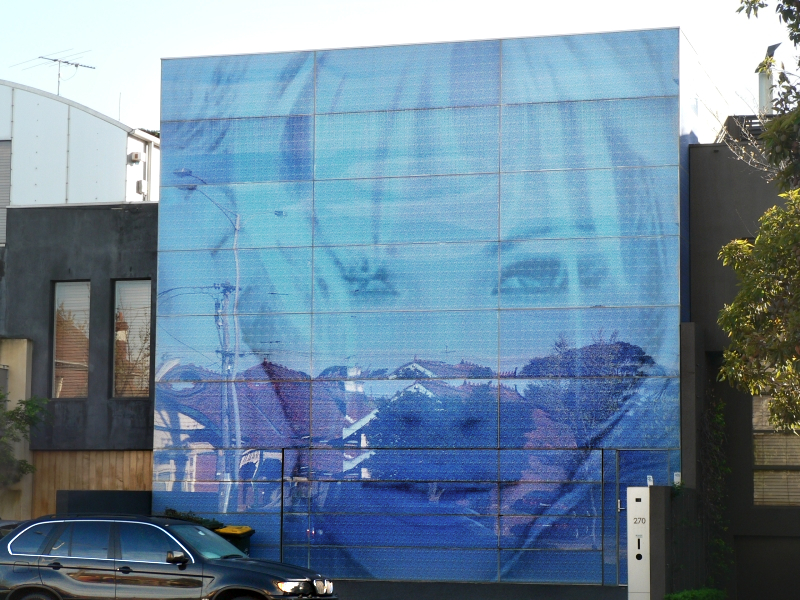
Newman House

- Beaconsfield Hotel, (1880) closed in 2004, the building is a notable landmark with its Italianate towers and has been proposed to be converted into apartments.
- The beach foreshore and Catani Gardens (1906) was planned by Italian civil engineer Carlo Catani with its Edwardian style central rotunda.
- The Canterbury flats built on Canterbury Road (1914-1919) by architects H.W. & F.B Tompkins is one of Melbourne's earliest apartment buildings.
- The West Beach Bathers Pavilion at West Beach (1928) was adaptively reused as a cafe and opened in 2004.
- The Gatwick Private Hotel was previously a boarding house, but was bought and renovated by the television show The Block.
- The former Cowderoy Dairy on Cowderoy Street (1932) is an art deco building that has been converted into a popular cafe adjacent to a small central park.
- St Kilda War Memorial was erected at Catani Gardens following World War II.
- Newman House on Canterbury Road (200) by architect Cassandra Fahey became a pop architecture icon when completed for local celebrity Sam Newman featuring an image of Pamela Anderson's face. Sam did not first obtain council permission, however permits were issued retrospectively when it became a major local landmark and won the award for Best New Residential Building in the Australian Institute of Architects Victorian Architecture awards. Newman never lived in the house and sold it for $1.1 million in mid-2002.

== Open and recreational space ==
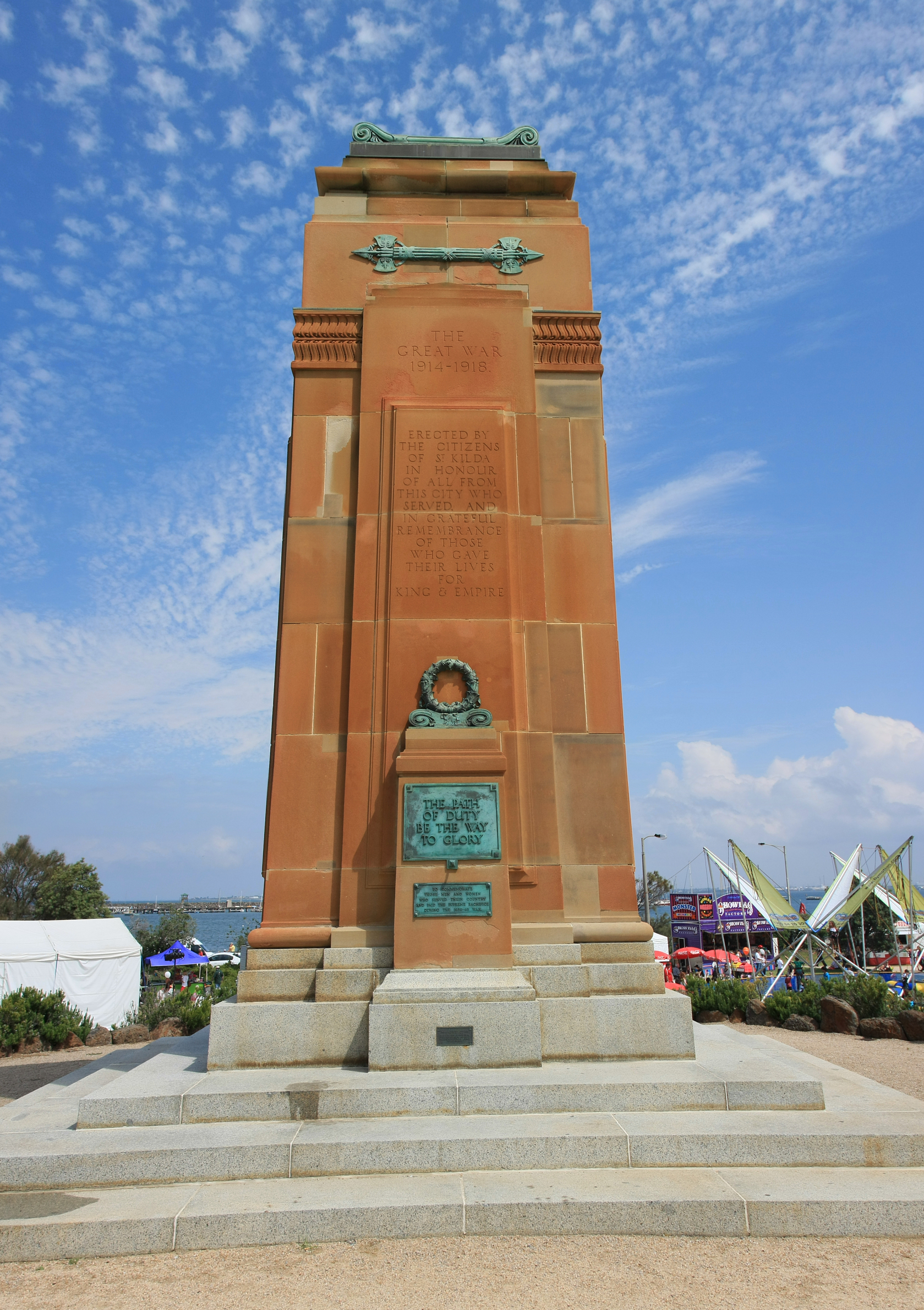
St Kilda War Memorial, Catani Gardens

The suburb has several parks, most notably Catani Gardens and the West Beach foreshore. Other smaller parks include Johnson Reserve on Canterbury Road and the Jacoby Reserve, all of which have playground facilities for children. The Cummins linear reserve on the median of Beaconsfield Parade has public toilets at the Cowderoy Street end. Just outside the suburb are the Albert Park and Lake running along the suburb's border to the north east and Cleve Gardens and St Kilda foreshore gardens to the south.

== Transport ==
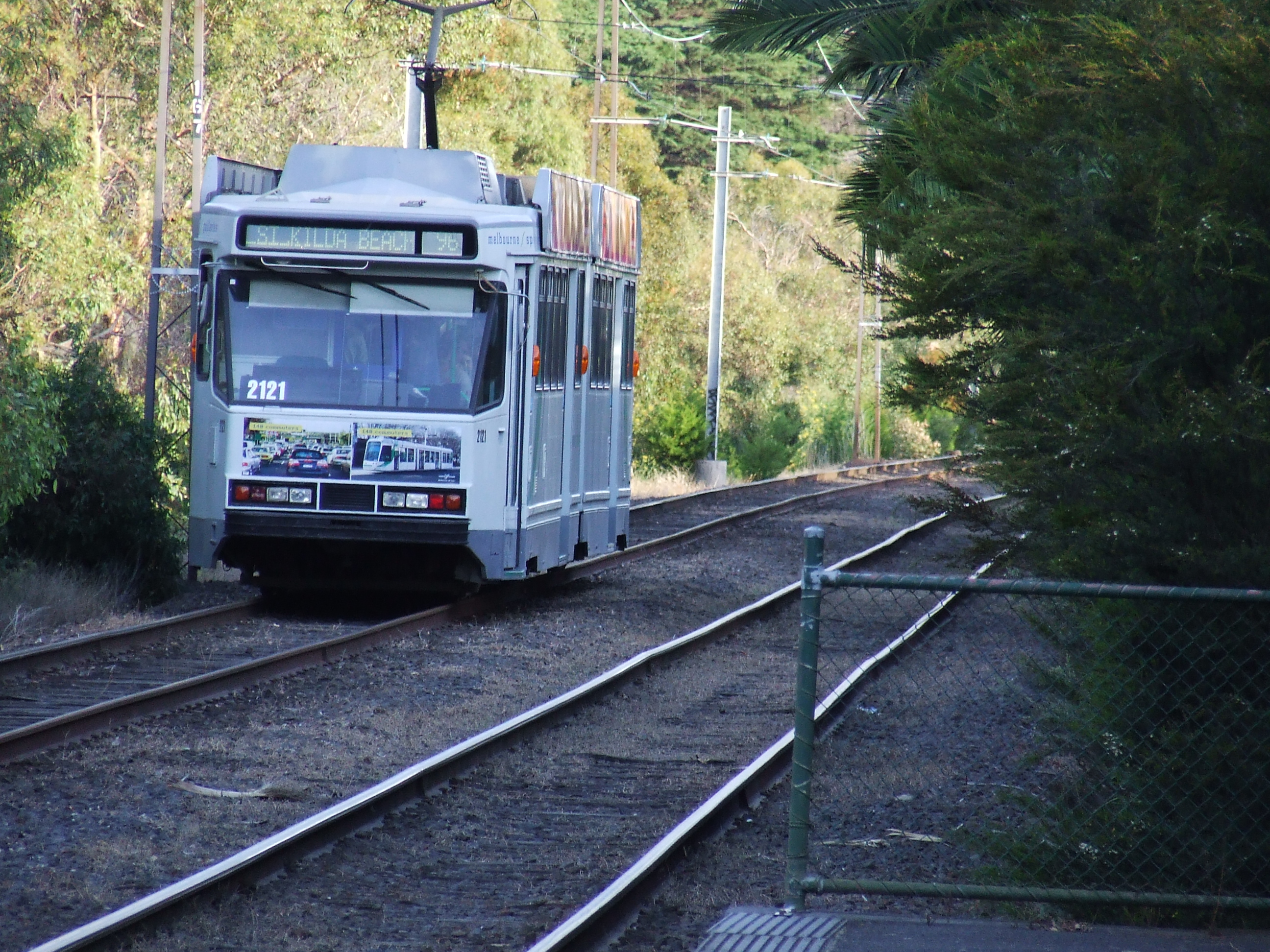
A light rail service near the Fraser Street tram stop

The main thoroughfares are Canterbury Road and Beaconsfield Parade. Both are dual carriageways. Park Street runs along the spine of the suburb and is a single carriageway.

Before conversion to light rail (route 96) in 1987, the rail reserve parallel to Canterbury Road served as the St Kilda railway line, with services to Flinders Street via Middle Park, Albert Park and South Melbourne.

St Kilda West is serviced by four tram routes:

Tram Routes in St Kilda West
No.	To/From	Along
Melbourne tram route 12	Victoria Gardens – Fitzroy Street, St Kilda	Park Street
Melbourne tram route 16	Melbourne University – Kew	Fitzroy Street
Melbourne tram route 96	Brunswick East – Acland Street, St Kilda	Fitzroy Street

== Notable residents ==
- Jim Stynes (lived on Mary Street until his death in 2012)

== See also ==
- City of St Kilda – St Kilda West was previously within this former local government area.
