= Hobsons Bay =

Bay in Victoria, Australia

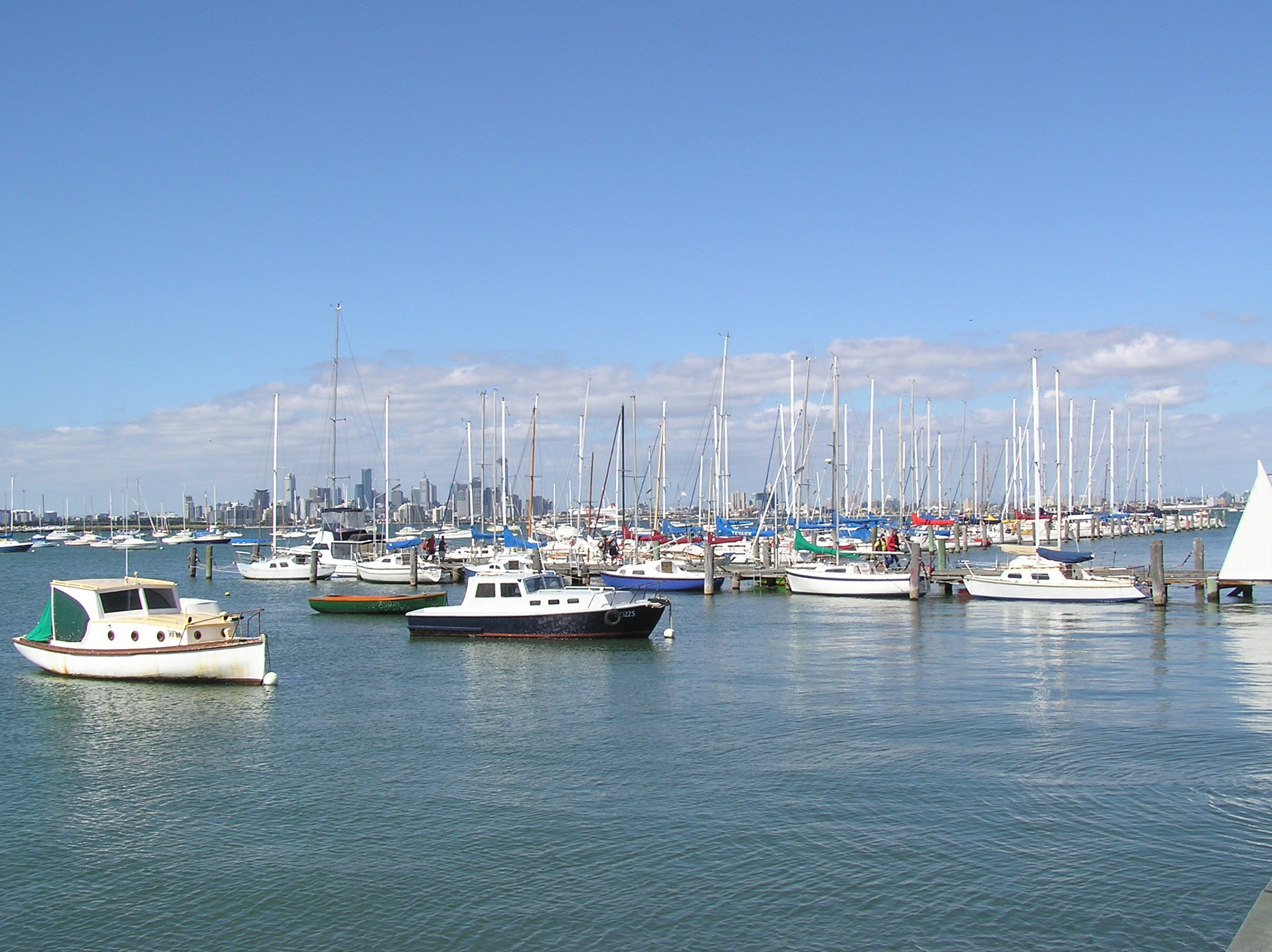
- Hobsons Bay Yacht Club 1864 Map of Hobson Bay, the Yarra River and Melbourne Town - Admiralty Chart

- Location of the bay in Greater Metropolitan Melbourne

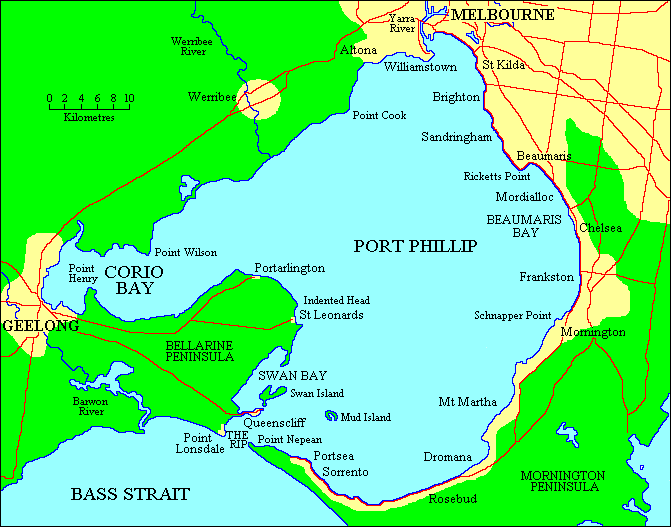
- Hobsons Bay is located north of Williamstown and south of Melbourne, within Port Phillip
- Location: Melbourne, Victoria
- Coordinates: 37°51′17″S 144°56′09″E
- Primary inflows: Yarra River
- Primary outflows: Port Phillip
- Basin countries: Australia
- Frozen: never
- Settlements: Port Melbourne; Williamstown

Hobsons Bay is a small open bay in Victoria, Australia, and is the northernmost part of the larger Port Phillip Bay. Its western and eastern boundaries are marked by Point Gellibrand in Williamstown and Point Ormond in Elwood respectively, and defines the coastal margin of the Melbourne suburbs of Williamstown, Newport, Port Melbourne, Albert Park, Middle Park, St. Kilda West, St. Kilda and Elwood. The Yarra River flows into Hobsons Bay.

Hobsons Bay is named after William Hobson who led the surveying party in Port Philip Bay.

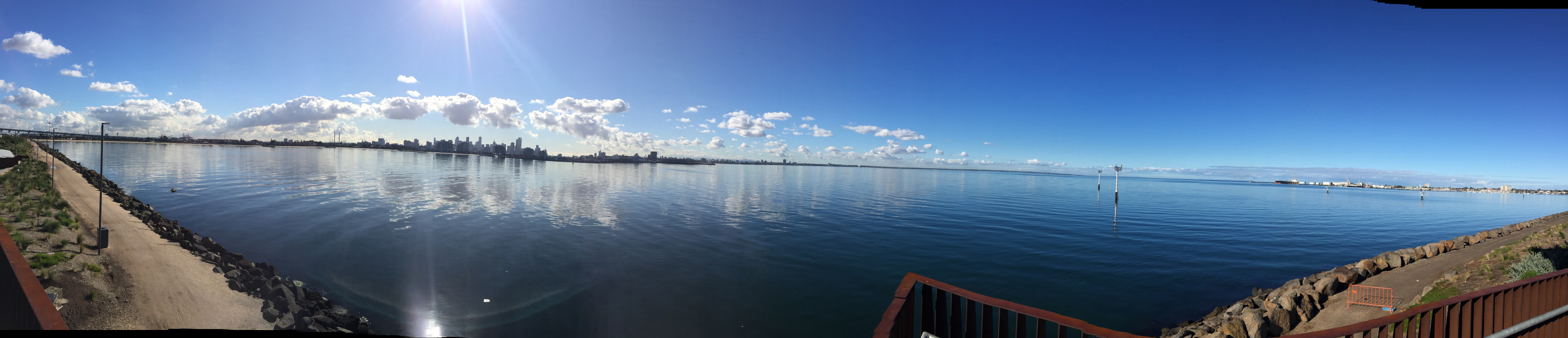
Hobsons Bay and Melbourne from Sandridge Lookout, looking Across Hobsons Bay towards Port Melbourne (previously Sandridge)
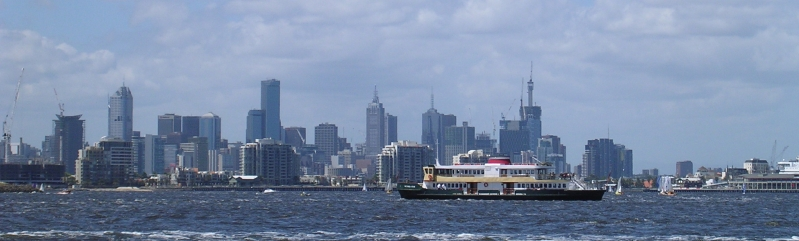
Melbourne skyline over Hobsons Bay

== Beaches ==
Beaches adjoining the bay are Sandridge Beach (in Port Melbourne), Port Melbourne Beach (in Port Melbourne), South Melbourne Beach (in Albert Park), West Beach (in St Kilda West) and St Kilda Beach (in St Kilda).

== See also ==
- City of Hobsons Bay
- Hobsons Bay Coastal Trail
- Melbourne and Hobson's Bay Railway Company
