= Fraser Street light rail station =

Tram stop in Melbourne, Australia

Fraser Street
- Southbound view of the platforms, April 2026

General information
- Location: St Kilda, Melbourne, Victoria
- Owner: VicTrack
- Operator: Yarra Trams
- Platforms: 2
- Tracks: 2

Construction
- Structure type: Embankment

Other information
- Status: Open
- Fare zone: Myki zone 1

History
- Opened: 21 November 1987

Services
Preceding station	Yarra Trams	Following station
Middle Park towards East Brunswick	Route 96	St Kilda towards St Kilda Beach
Location

Fraser Street is a tram stop located on the St Kilda light rail in Melbourne, Australia and is served by Route 96. The tram stop opened on 21 November 1987 with the opening of the St Kilda light rail, which had been converted from a heavy rail line. The tram stop serves the wider Albert Park.

== History ==
=== Heavy rail line ===
The first railway to open through the area in which the Fraser Street tram stop is now located was the original heavy rail line from Melbourne Terminus to St Kilda. A station was never built at Fraser Street prior to the conversion to a light rail line, a station was built nearby in 1883 at Middle Park, with that station opening on 2 July 1883.

During the late 1970s and into the 1980s, patronage on both the St Kilda and Port Melbourne Line was dwindling. The government of the age proposed to close both lines and replace rail services with bus services. This was culminated in the 1980s with the release of the Lonie Report in 1980. Although the Lonie Report was never enacted upon, both railway lines were still proposed to be closed. In 1985, the Victorian state government released plans for both the St Kilda and Port Melbourne Lines to be closed to heavy rail traffic and to be converted into light rail lines.

=== Conversion to light rail ===
The St Kilda Line was closed to rail traffic on 31 July 1987 to allow for the conversion of the line between Clarendon Street in South Melbourne and St Kilda station. During the construction, the rails on each track were pushed further towards the other, reducing the loading gauge from 1600mm broad gauge, as used on all other heavy rail lines in Victoria to 1435mm standard gauge, as used on all other tram lines in Melbourne. The voltage in the overhead wires was also converted from 1500V DC to 600V DC, to match other trams in Melbourne. Also as part of construction, new tram stops were built at Melbourne Sports and Aquatic Centre and at Fraser Street as well as the station at Middle Park being completely rebuilt to demolish the former platforms and replacing them with lower tram platforms.

Construction of the new intermediate tram stops had begun prior to the closure of the heavy rail line, in mid 1987. These new stops were completed by September 1987.

As part of the conversion, then tram operator The Met ordered new articulated trams to be operated on the new light rail lines. The first of these new trams were delivered in December 1984 and were named as the 'B1 Class'. These were supplemented, beginning in 1988 with the delivery of B2 Class trams.

=== Light rail line ===
The newly converted light rail line was opened on 21 November 1987 along with the new stops at MSAC and Fraser Street. Upon opening, the new light rail line was incorporated into and served by Route 96 trams from East Brunswick.

In 2012, the Fraser Street stop was upgraded to enhance accessibility and lighting and additional seating. This was done as part of a wider project to upgrade Route 96 along its light rail alignment and its stops through St Kilda. This project was completed in 2015.

== Services ==
Fraser Street is served by Route 96 along the St Kilda light rail. The route runs from East Brunswick in the north to St Kilda Beach in the south. Tram services from this stop are operated by Yarra Trams.
