= Middle Park =

Middle Park may refer to:

== Australia ==
- Middle Park, Queensland, a suburb of Brisbane in Australia
- Middle Park, Victoria, a suburb of Melbourne in Australia
  - Middle Park (stadium), a former football (soccer) stadium located in Melbourne, Australia
  - Middle Park light rail station, Melbourne

== United Kingdom ==
- Middle Park, a district in the Birmingham ward of Weoley
- Middle Park, London, an area and housing estate of Eltham in the London Borough of Greenwich
- Middle Park, County Antrim, a townland in County Antrim, Northern Ireland
- Middle Park Stakes, a Group 1 flat horse race in Great Britain

== United States ==
- Middle Park (Colorado basin), a valley in the Rocky Mountains in north-central Colorado in the United States
- Middle Park, a park located in Algonquin in the videogame Grand Theft Auto IV based on Central Park in Manhattan, New York City
