= Carmelite Library =

Theological library in Middle Park, Victoria, Australia

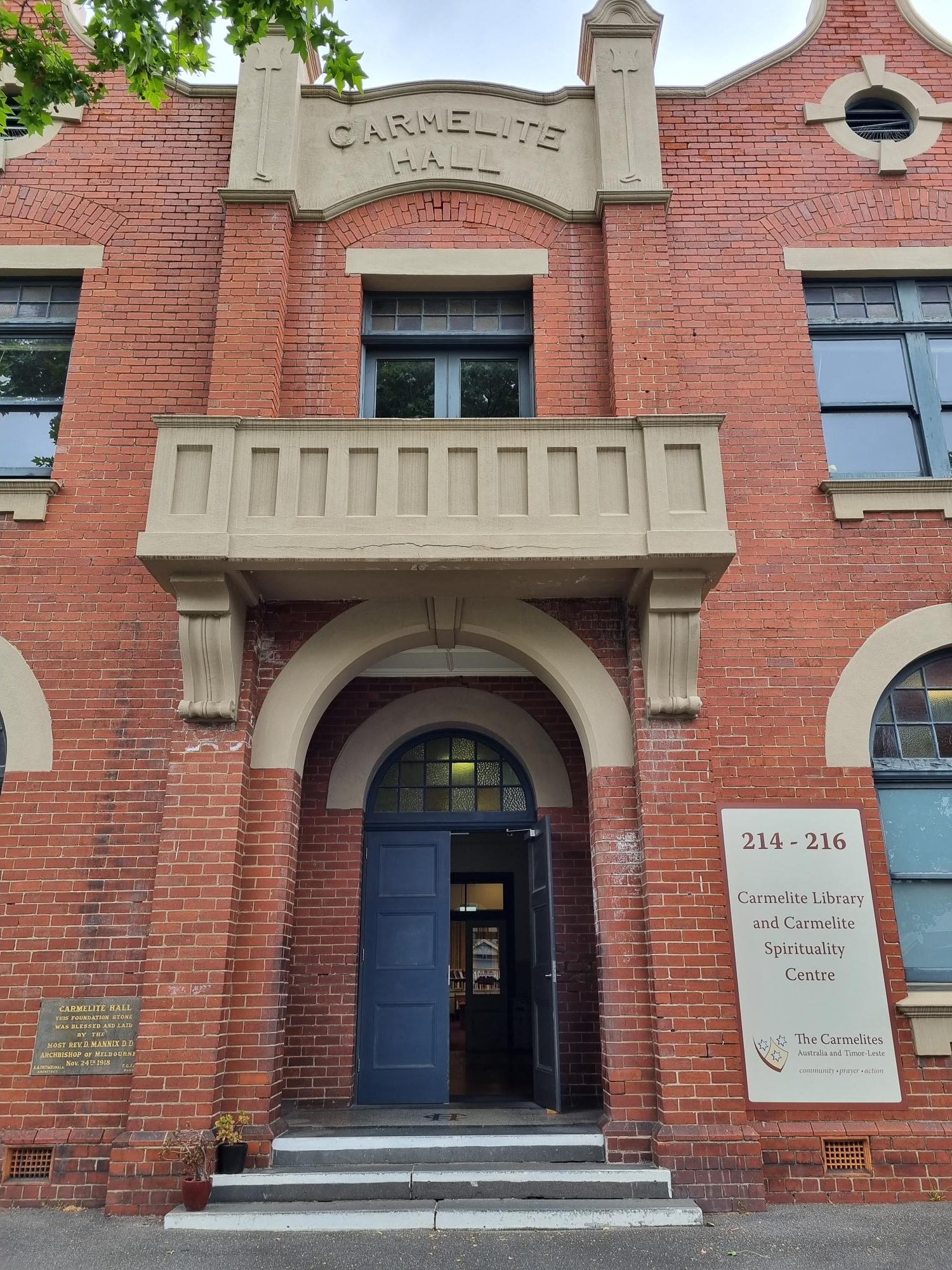
- Carmelite Library Entrance

General information
- Type: Academic theological Library
- Location: 214 Richardson Street, Middle Park, Victoria, Australia
- Coordinates: 37°50′54.43217″S 144°57′36.76648″E
- Owner: Australian and Timor-Leste Carmelites

Technical details
- Floor count: 2

Website
- www.carmelitelibrary.org

The Carmelite Library is an academic theological library located in Middle Park, Victoria, Australia. The library specialises in the areas of Carmelite Studies, Mariology, Spirituality and Mysticism, and holds books and journals in these subject areas. The library supports teaching and research at the University of Divinity and its resources are also available to Carmelites, researchers, visiting scholars, and members of the general public.

== History ==
The Carmelites is a Roman Catholic religious order founded in the late twelfth century. The Carmelite Library is part of the Province of Australia and Timor-Leste. The Carmelite friars first arrived in Australia from Ireland in 1881 and brought with them the kernel of what is now the Carmelite Library. In 1886, when they established their first purpose-built priory in Albert Park, a library was one of the house's public rooms. Later, in 1928, when the decision was made for novices and students to be trained in Melbourne rather than Ireland, an academic library developed at Whitefriars House of Studies. Whitefriars was originally located in Kew, then in Donvale from 1937, before moving to Middle Park in 2006.

In 1942, the Advocate (Melbourne) noted that the Carmelite Library was being conducted under the auspices of the Our Lady of Mount Carmel branch of the Holy Name Society in Middle Park and at that time held 1,500 items.

In the 1980s, the decision was made to stop collecting across the full range of theological disciplines and to focus on three main areas that are closely aligned with the life and spirit of the Carmelite order. These are Carmelitana (all aspects of the life, history and spiritual tradition of the Order, Spirituality (the Christian spiritual and mystical tradition, both historical and contemporary, and its links to other world spiritual traditions) and Mariology (the theological study of the Virgin Mary).

In 2005, the Carmelite Library was featured on an Australian Broadcasting Corporation (ABC) Radio National program. In the program A Mystical Library, presenter Rachael Kohn interviewed the Carmelite Library's then-manager Fr Paul Chandler who spoke about the library's history, purpose and some of the significant items in its collection.

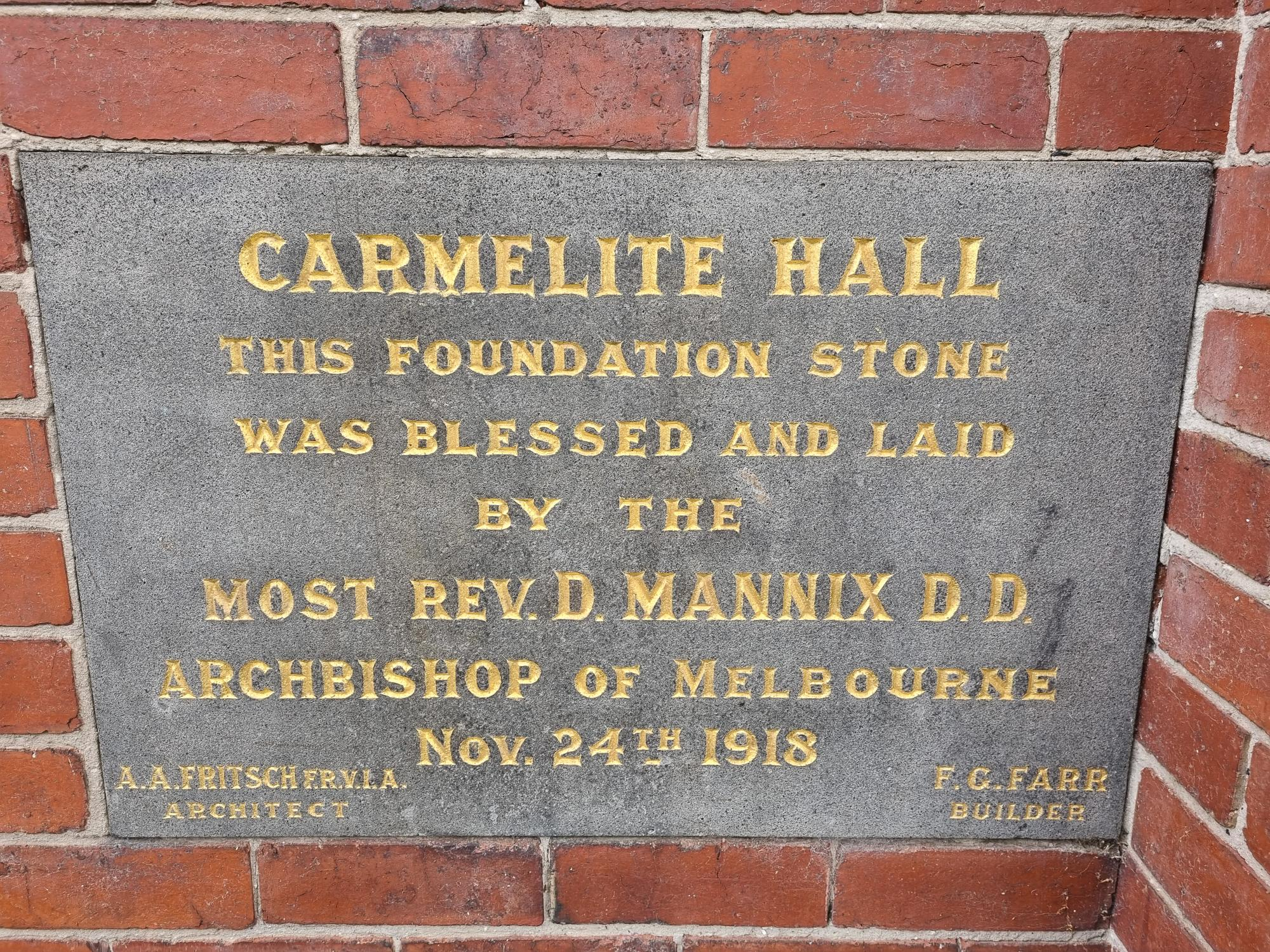
Foundation stone of Carmelite Hall

The library moved from the Carmelite monastery in Donvale to the Carmelite Hall in 2006. The Carmelite Hall, built in 1918, is a spacious heritage building located next to the Church of Our Lady of Mount Carmel in the Carmelite parish at Middle Park. The Carmelite Library is located in the same building as the Carmelite Centre, which was formally launched in 2009. Many of the centre's events are held in the Carmelite Library.

In 2023, a new partnership was announced between the Carmelite Library and the University of Divinity, for the university to provide library management services and to work with the Carmelites to facilitate operational developments and determine the future direction of the library.

The Carmelite Library welcomes both "the scholar and the seeker" to make use of its resources.

== Special collections ==
The Carmelite Library holds Australia's finest collection of books in the area of spirituality and mysticism, with some volumes dating back to the 16th century. The library also holds a significant rare books collection of approximately 750 items. In 2021 the library received a National Library of Australia's Community Heritage Grant to conduct a significance assessment of the Carmelite Library rare books collection. In 2022 a second grant was received to conduct a preservation needs assessment of the same collection.

Collections related to the lives of significant Carmelite figures are also a feature of the library's holdings. These include Saint Albert of Jerusalem, Doctors of the Church Saint Teresa of Avila and Saint Therese of Lisieux, Saint John of the Cross, Blessed Titus Brandsma, Saint Teresa Benedicta of the Cross, Saint George Preca, Blessed Hilary Januszewski and Saint Elizabeth of the Trinity.

== Collaboration with other libraries ==
The Carmelite Library is part of the larger University of Divinity library network. All members of the university may borrow from all associated libraries, which share a joint Library Collections Policy. Reciprocal borrowing arrangements are also in place between the University of Divinity and the University of Melbourne libraries. The Carmelite Library is a member of the Australian and New Zealand Theological Library Association (ANZTLA).
