= History of football clubs in St Kilda, Melbourne, Australia =

This is a list of Australian rules football clubs that originated in St Kilda, Victoria, Australia.

== List of Clubs ==
=== St Kilda Football Club (1858–1864) ===
Formed April 1858, played at Alpaca Park. First match 28 March 1859 against University. The club lapsed in June 1864, due to lack of members.

=== St Kilda Esplanade Football Club (1871–1889) ===
Played on the Esplanade Oval, wanted to move to the St Kilda Road Park. In 1876 applied to use the ground of West St Kilda Cricket Club, opposites the Village Belle Hotel.

=== St Kilda Alma Football Club (1873–77 1881–1886) ===
Formed 1872. In 1875 Hon Sec R H Adam. Ground Alpaca Reserve until found unsuitable due to planted trees. 1875 moved to area of Albert Park below the Alpaca Reserve and railway embankment. Club colors dark blue and white caps, blue guernsey and knickerbockers, and blue and white hose.

=== St Kilda Royal Football Club (1884–1888) ===
Wanted to play on the St Kilda Football Ground

=== South St Kilda Football Club (1873–1899 maybe 1922) ===
Played on oval near railway station and Fitzroy st in Albert Park

=== St Kilda Grosvenor Football Club (1888–1890) ===
Played on St Kilda Reserve

=== St Kilda Junior Football Club (1883–1922) ===
Played Elwood Reserve

=== Warehousemen Football Club (1865–1918) ===
Albert Park

=== St Kilda football club (1873 - ===
Alpaca Park, Junction Oval, Linton St Moorabbin, Waverley Park, Docklands Stadium
