= Albert Park railway station =

Albert Park railway station may refer to:

- Albert Park railway station, Adelaide, Australia
- Albert Park light rail station, Melbourne, Australia
- Withington and Albert Park railway station, a former station in Manchester, UK

== See also ==
- King Albert Park MRT station, Singapore
