= MSAC =

MSAC may refer to:

- Melbourne Sports and Aquatic Centre, an international sporting venue located in Albert Park, Victoria, Australia
- Mountain States Athletic Conference, the official name of the Skyline Conference (1938–1962), a college athletic conference in the United States that was active from 1938 to 1962
