= Reg Werner =

Australian rules footballer

Personal information
- Full name: Reginald Norman Werner
- Born: 23 August 1885; Fitzroy, Victoria
- Died: 26 June 1952 (aged 66); Albert Park, Victoria
- Original team: Railway United

Playing career^{1}
Years	Club	Games (Goals)
1910	Melbourne	2 (3)
- ^{1} Playing statistics correct to the end of 1910.

Reginald Norman Werner (23 August 1885 – 26 June 1952) was an Australian rules footballer who played with Melbourne in the Victorian Football League (VFL).
