= Ernest McIntyre =

Australian rules footballer and cricketer

Ernie McIntyre
- Born: Ernest John McIntyre; 19 April 1921; Albert Park, Victoria
- Died: 10 April 2003 (aged 81); Melbourne, Victoria
Australian rules football career
Personal information
- Height: 185 cm (6 ft 1 in)
- Weight: 89 kg (196 lb)
- Position: Ruckman
Playing career^{1}
Years	Club	Games (Goals)
1939–40	Sandringham (VFA)	16 (18)
1940–41, 1943–48	St Kilda	80 (57)
1948–49	Collingwood	12 (17)
1952	Sandringham (VFA)	4 (4)
- ^{1} Playing statistics correct to the end of 1952.
- Cricket career

Cricket information
- Batting: Right-handed
- Bowling: Right arm fast-medium
- Role: Bowler

Domestic team information
- Years: Team
- 1946/47: Victoria

Career statistics
Competition	First-class
Matches	2
Runs scored	4
Batting average	4.00
100s/50s	0/0
Top score	2
Balls bowled	392
Wickets	11
Bowling average	16.45
5 wickets in innings	0
10 wickets in match	0
Best bowling	4/52
Catches/stumpings	3/–
- Source: CricInfo, 11 March 2023

Ernest John McIntyre (19 April 1921 – 10 April 2003) was an Australian rules footballer who played for St Kilda and Collingwood in the Victorian Football League (VFL) during the 1940s. He was born at Albert Park, Victoria, a suburb of Melbourne, in 1921.

McIntyre, a ruckman, began his football career with Victorian Football Association (VFA) club Sandringham in 1939 before crossing to the VFL where he joined St Kilda. A dentist by profession, he played his football as an amateur and didn't appear at all for St Kilda in 1942 due to Navy commitments. He represented Victoria in an interstate match against South Australia at Adelaide in 1945.

Noted for his sportsmanlike conduct on the field, on one occasion during a game McIntyre helped opponent Don Cordner to his feet and also once applauded another opponent Bill Morris after he took a good mark. This rubbed coach Fred Froude and the St Kilda committee up the wrong way and when McIntyre was relegated to 19th man for a game in 1948 he resigned and switched to Collingwood. He appeared in his first ever final series that year, kicking two goals in Collingwood's losing Preliminary Final against Melbourne.

A club cricketer for St Kilda during the 1940s, McIntyre also played two first-class cricket matches for Victoria as a right-arm fast-medium pace bowler, taking 11 wickets at a bowling average of 16.45 runs per wicket. Both his first-class matches were against Tasmania in December 1946 in non-Sheffield Shield matches. In the second fixture, at Hobart, McIntyre took 4/52 in the first innings which were his career best figures.

McIntyre died at Melbourne in April 2003. He was aged 81.
