= Melbourne Sports and Aquatic Centre =

Sporting venue located in Melbourne, Australia

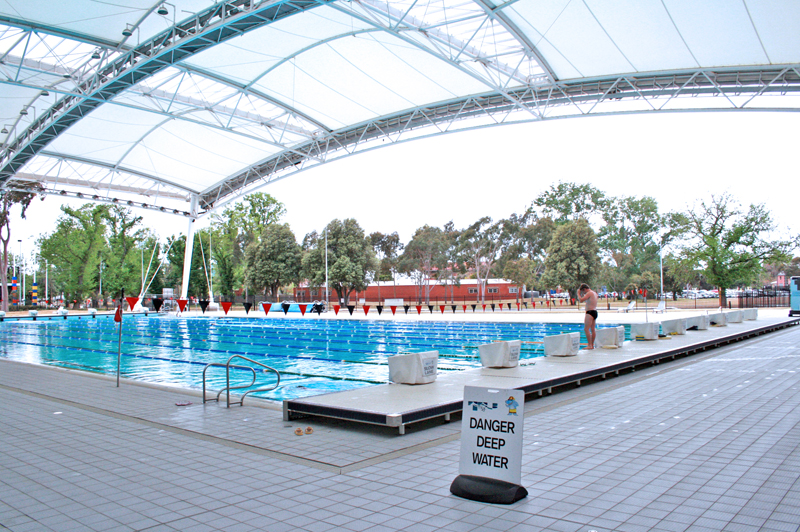
- Outdoor 50m competition pool in 2009
- Interactive map of Melbourne Sports and Aquatic Centre
- Full name: Melbourne Sports and Aquatic Centre (MSAC)
- Address: Albert Park, Victoria, Australia
- Coordinates: 37°50′35.2″S 144°57′43.8″E
- Capacity: 1,800 indoor pool, 3,000 outdoor pool, 1,800 Show Court

Construction
- Built: 1997
- Opened: 24 July 1997
- Architect: Peddle Thorp Architects

Tenants
- Basketball; Victoria Giants (NBL) (2003–2004); Melbourne United (NBL; training) (2018–present); Basketball Australia (2018–present); Other Tenants; Table Tennis Victoria; Victorian Water Polo; Australian University Sport; Squash Vic; Swimming Victoria; Basketball Victoria; Diving Victoria; Melbourne Vicentre

Website
- Melbourne Sports Centres

Melbourne Sports and Aquatic Centre (MSAC) is an international sporting venue located in Albert Park, Victoria, Australia. The centre was opened on 24 July 1997 at a construction cost of A$65 million. The cost was funded by the State Government of Victoria and the City of Port Phillip. The centre has hosted international events including the 2006 Commonwealth Games and the 2007 World Aquatics Championships.

The centre has several swimming pools and international standard diving facilities. There is a large multi-purpose sports hall used for sports such as badminton, basketball, table tennis and volleyball, and also squash courts and a gym.

It is one of four sporting facilities in Melbourne – the others being the State Netball and Hockey Centre (SNHC), and Lakeside Stadium, and the State Basketball Centre (SBC) – to be named under the banner of State Sport Centres, and is operated by the State Sports Centres Trust.

The centre is accessible by tram routes 12 and 96 which both pass near Southern Cross railway station and the Melbourne City Centre.

== Construction ==
=== Stage 1 ===
The first part of MSAC's construction was completed in 1997. This included the majority of the facilities currently at MSAC including the indoor pools and the sports hall.

=== Stage 2 ===
In 2002, it was announced that MSAC would be expanded in time for the 2006 Commonwealth Games. A new hydrotherapy pool, a new 50 metre outdoor pool and improved transport links were some of the facilities added in the $51 million expansion. Work began on the Stage 2 project in September 2003. The expansion opened in early 2006. Since then, a movable floor was installed in the 50m outdoor pool which allows the water depth to be varied.

== Facilities ==
The centre boasts numerous facilities.

=== Aquatics ===
- Indoor 50m pool
- 25m lap pool
- Multi-purpose pool
- Hydrotherapy pool
- Outdoor 50m pool
- Wave pool
- Diving boards
- Water slide dismantled as at 31 Dec 2019

=== Sport ===
- 10 indoor basketball courts
- 10 squash courts
- 12 badminton courts
- 18 table tennis tables
- 3 volleyball courts

National Basketball League club Melbourne United have been based at the centre since the start of the 2018/19. The team trains in the basketball precinct, which features an 1800-seat show court, and have their club offices and facilities located in the centre.

== Events hosted ==
MSAC regularly hosts many events including state and national championships. Among the major events MSAC has hosted are:

- 2001 Women's World Open Squash Championship
- 2005 Summer Deaflympics
- 2006 Commonwealth Games - squash, diving, swimming, table tennis
- 2007 FINA World Swimming Championships - diving, water polo
- 2007 and 2008 Australian Club Championships
- NBL games for Victoria Giants
- 2022 FINA World Swimming Championships (25 m)

Charlene Wittstock, the future Princess of Monaco, won a gold medal for South Africa in the 2002 World Cup held at MSAC. She returned to the MSAC on a royal visit to Melbourne in March 2012.

== Gallery ==
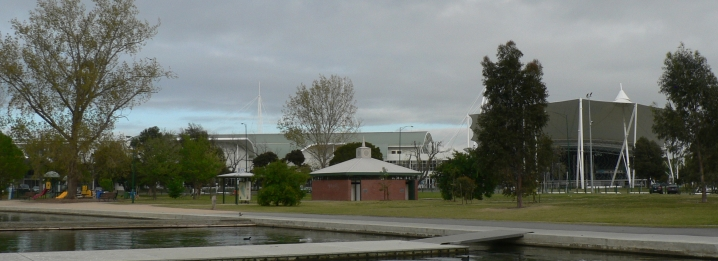
Exterior view from Albert Park Lake

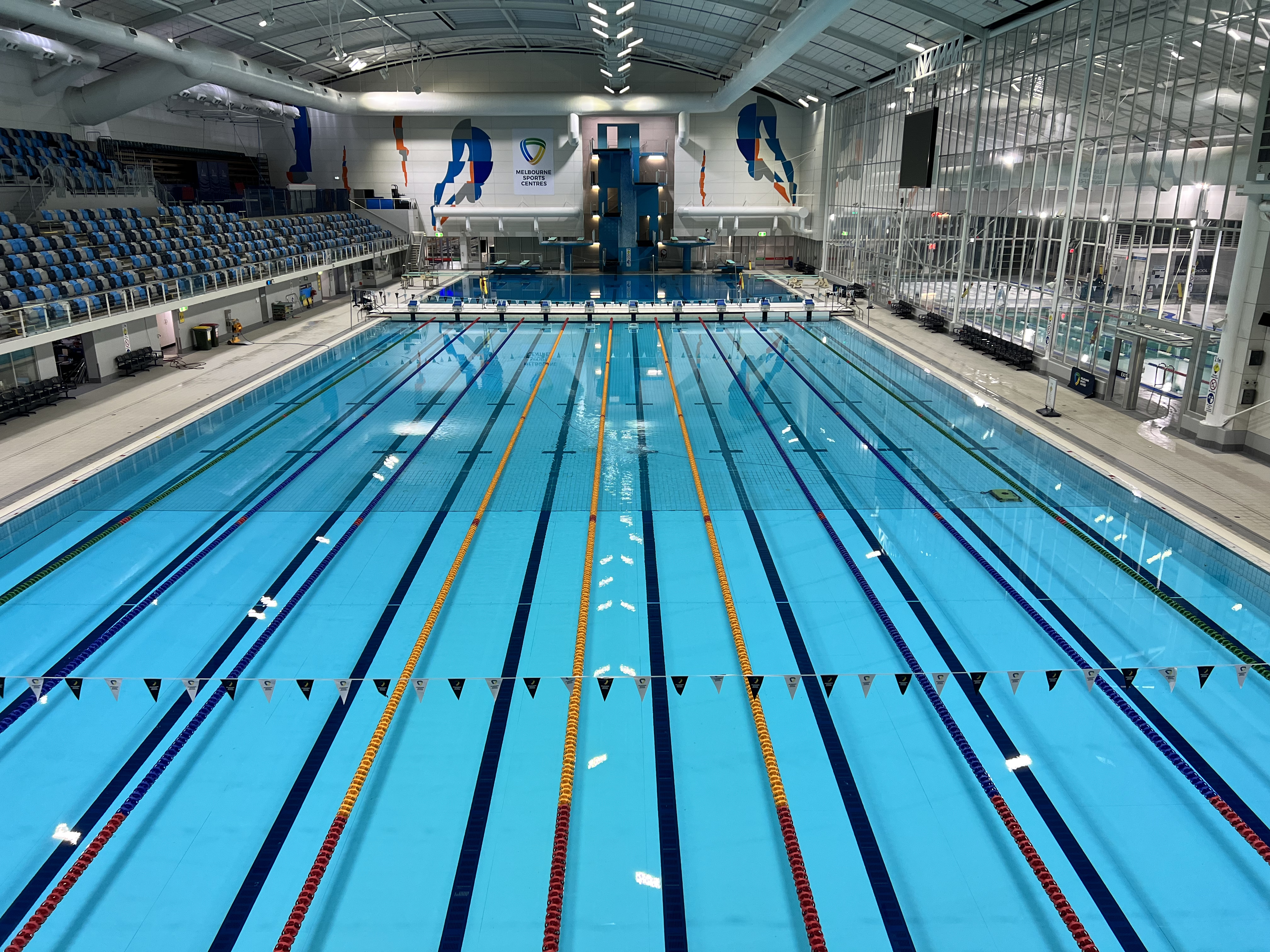
Indoor 50m competition pool (opened 1997)

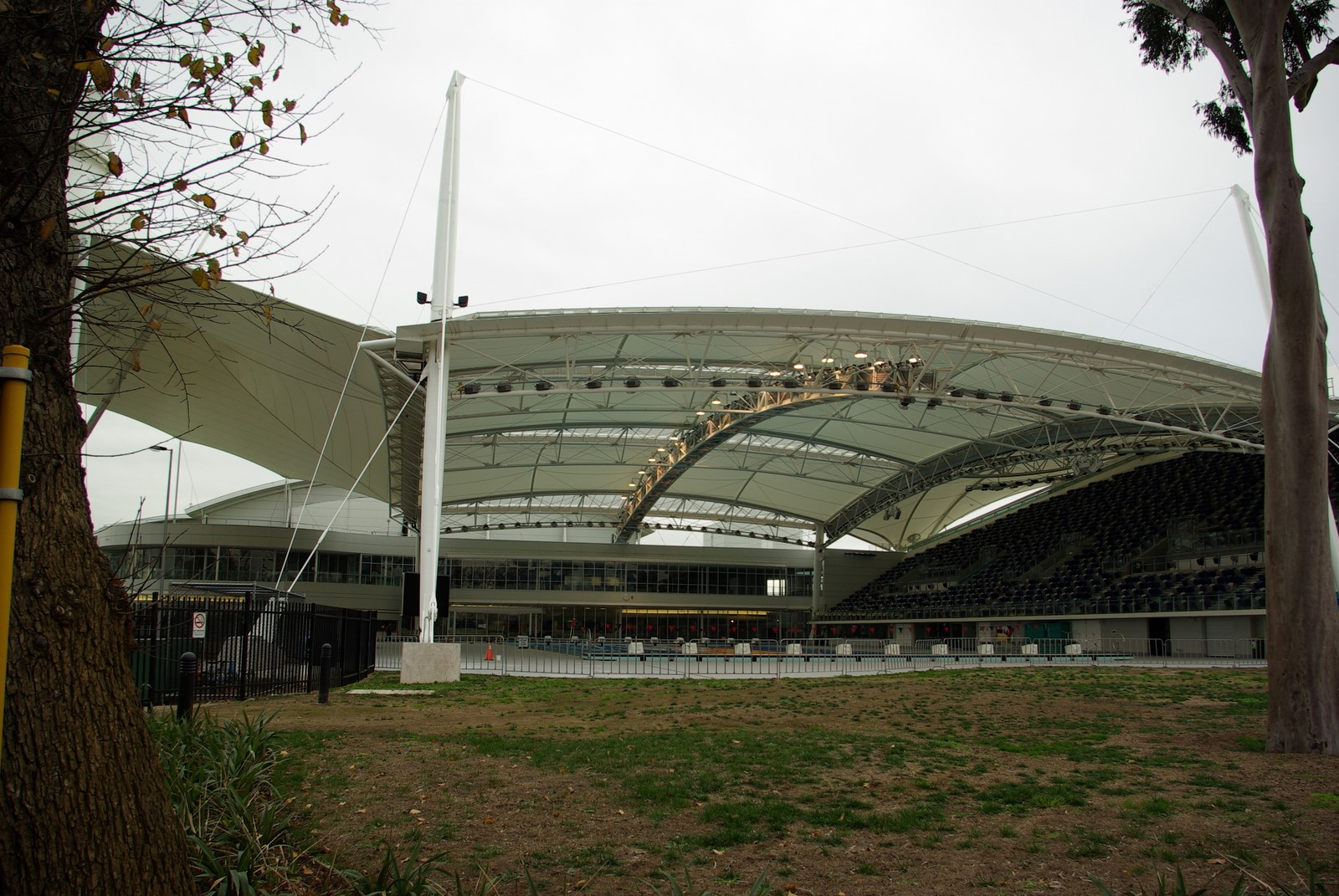
Outdoor swimming pool

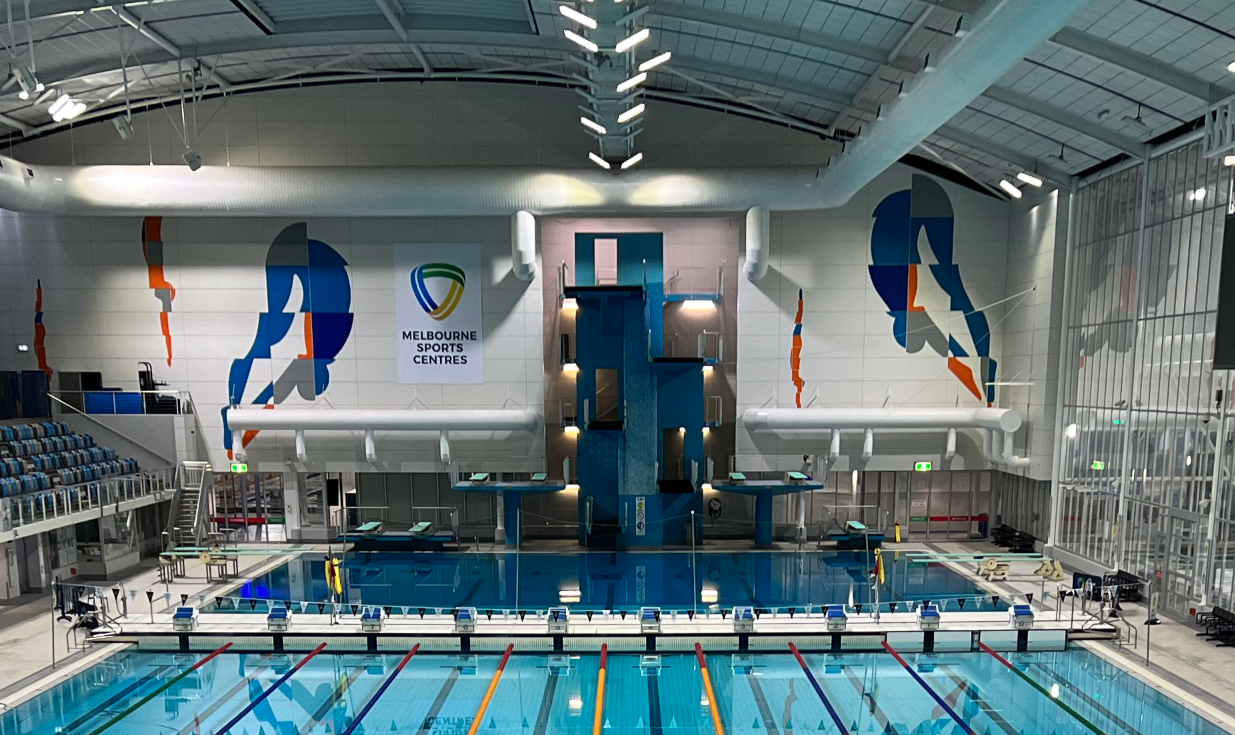
Diving pool

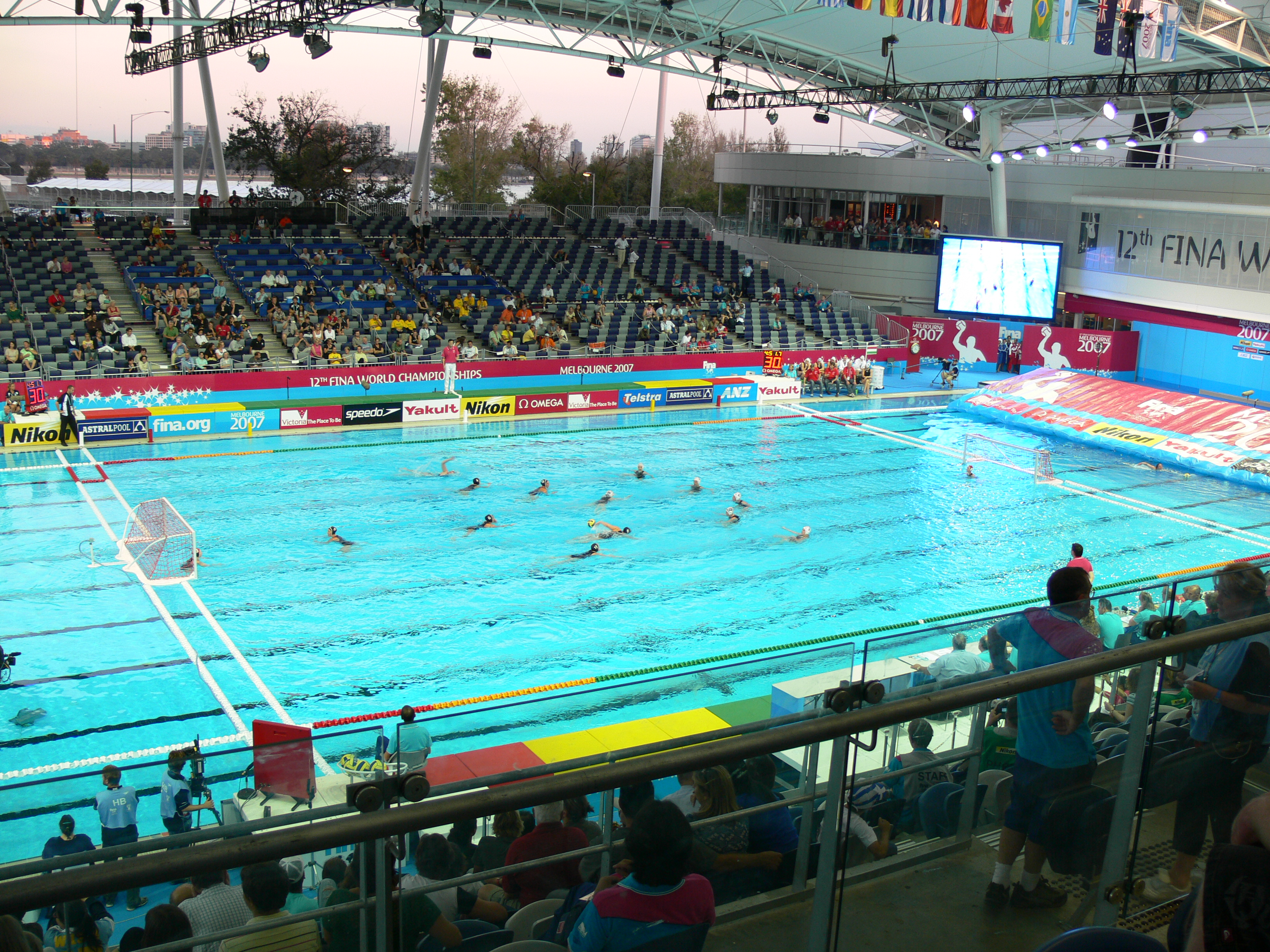
Women's water polo match during the 2007 World Aquatics Championships

== Light rail station ==
Melbourne Sports and Aquatic Centre

General information
- Location: Albert Park/Middle Park, Victoria 3206; Australia
- Coordinates: 37°50′43″S 144°57′42″E
- System: PTV tram stop
- Owner: VicTrack
- Operator: Yarra Trams
- Line: St Kilda
- Platforms: 2 (2 side)
- Tracks: 2

Construction
- Structure type: At grade
- Accessible: Yes

Other information
- Status: Operational
- Station code: 129
- Fare zone: Myki Zone 1

History
- Electrified: 600 V DC overhead

Services
Preceding station	Yarra Trams	Following station
Albert Park towards East Brunswick	Route 96	Middle Park towards St Kilda Beach
Location

A light rail station with the same name servicing the facility is located approximately 100 metres from the facility. It is a light rail station on the former St Kilda railway line, located on Canterbury Road.

Yarra Trams operates one route via Melbourne Sports and Aquatic Centre light rail station:

- : East Brunswick – St Kilda Beach
