= Middle Park light rail station =

Light rail station in Melbourne, Victoria

Middle Park
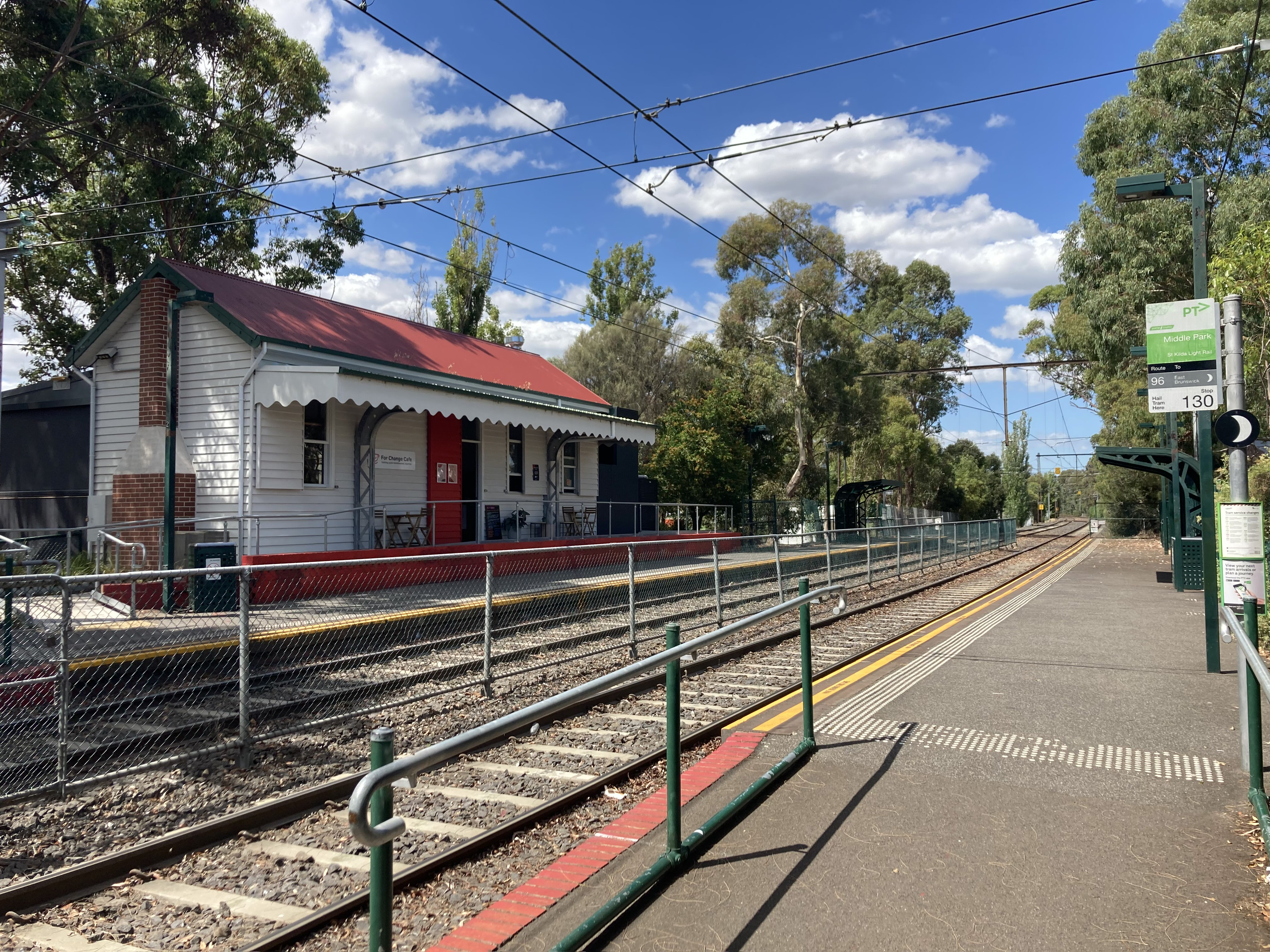
- Middle Park light rail station in March 2023

General information
- Location: Albert Park/Middle Park; Victoria 3206; Australia
- Coordinates: 37°50′59″S 144°57′56″E
- System: PTV tram stop
- Owner: VicTrack
- Operator: Yarra Trams
- Line: St Kilda
- Platforms: 2 (2 side)
- Tracks: 2

Construction
- Structure type: At grade
- Accessible: Yes

Other information
- Status: Operational
- Station code: 130; MPK (former)
- Fare zone: Myki Zone 1

History
- Opened: 2 July 1883
- Closed: 1 August 1987
- Rebuilt: 21 November 1987
- Electrified: 600 V DC overhead
- Former names: Middle Park railway station

Services
| Preceding station | Yarra Trams | Following station |
|---|---|---|
| Melbourne Sports and Aquatic Centre towards East Brunswick | Route 96 | Fraser Street towards St Kilda Beach |
Former services
| Preceding station | MetRail | Following station |
|---|---|---|
| Albert Park towards Flinders Street | St Kilda line | St Kilda Terminus |
Location

Middle Park is a light rail station on the former St Kilda railway line, in the Melbourne suburb of Middle Park, on the corner of Canterbury Road and Armstrong Street. A pair of low-level side platforms now serve route 96 trams running on a light rail line. Other nearby light rail stops are at Fraser Street and Wright Street. Those and a number of other stops were added after the line was converted to light rail.

== History ==
Middle Park station opened in 1883, well after the line opened in 1857. The St Kilda railway line closed in 1987, and was converted to light rail, with the route 96 tram now running past the former station. The last heavy rail train service ran on 31 July 1987, and the light rail service was officially commissioned on 21 November of that year. The high-level platforms used by trains were demolished to make way for the construction of lower-level platforms, but the station building remained at the original level.

In 2006, the building was redeveloped as a café called Mart 130, but it was gutted by fire on 19 February 2018, and later demolished. It has since been rebuilt and, as of 2022, houses the For Change Co. café It was not the first time fire had destroyed the station: a fire in July 1978 also gutted the station building.

== Tram services ==
Yarra Trams operates one route via Middle Park station:

- : East Brunswick – St Kilda Beach
