= South Melbourne light rail station =

Light rail station in Melbourne, Victoria

South Melbourne
- View from southbound platform in October 2026

General information
- Location: South Melbourne, Victoria 3205; Australia
- Coordinates: 37°50′00″S 144°57′20″E
- System: PTV tram stop
- Owner: VicTrack
- Operator: Yarra Trams
- Line: St Kilda
- Platforms: 2 (2 side)
- Tracks: 2

Construction
- Structure type: At grade
- Accessible: Yes

Other information
- Status: Operational
- Station code: 127; SMB (former)
- Fare zone: Myki Zone 1

History
- Opened: 16 September 1858
- Closed: 1 August 1987
- Rebuilt: 21 November 1987
- Electrified: 600 V DC overhead
- Former names: Emerald Hill; South Melbourne railway station

Services
Preceding station	Yarra Trams	Following station
City Road towards East Brunswick	Route 96	Albert Park towards St Kilda Beach
Former services
Preceding station	MetRail	Following station
Flinders Street Terminus	St Kilda line	Albert Park towards St Kilda
Location

South Melbourne is a light rail station on the former St Kilda railway line, and was located in the Melbourne suburb of South Melbourne, Victoria, Australia. The station was adjacent to the intersection of Ferrars and Dorcas Streets, just minutes from South Melbourne Market. A pair of low-level side platforms, immediately north of the disused station, now serve route 96 trams on the light rail line, with a pedestrian crossing in between.

== History ==
South Melbourne station opened in 1858, not long after the line through it opened in 1857. It was originally known as Emerald Hill, and was renamed South Melbourne in 1884. To the south of the station are three road overpasses in quick succession, carrying Dorcas, Bank and Park streets over the light rail line.

The St Kilda railway line was closed in 1987, and was converted to a light rail route. The route 96 tram now runs past the former station. The last train service ran on 31 July 1987, and the light rail service was officially commissioned on 21 November of the same year. The high-level railway platforms have been fenced off from public access. The station building is now a child care centre.

== Tram services ==
Yarra Trams operates one route via South Melbourne station:

- : East Brunswick – St Kilda Beach
