= Albert Park light rail station =

Light rail station in Melbourne, Victoria

Albert Park
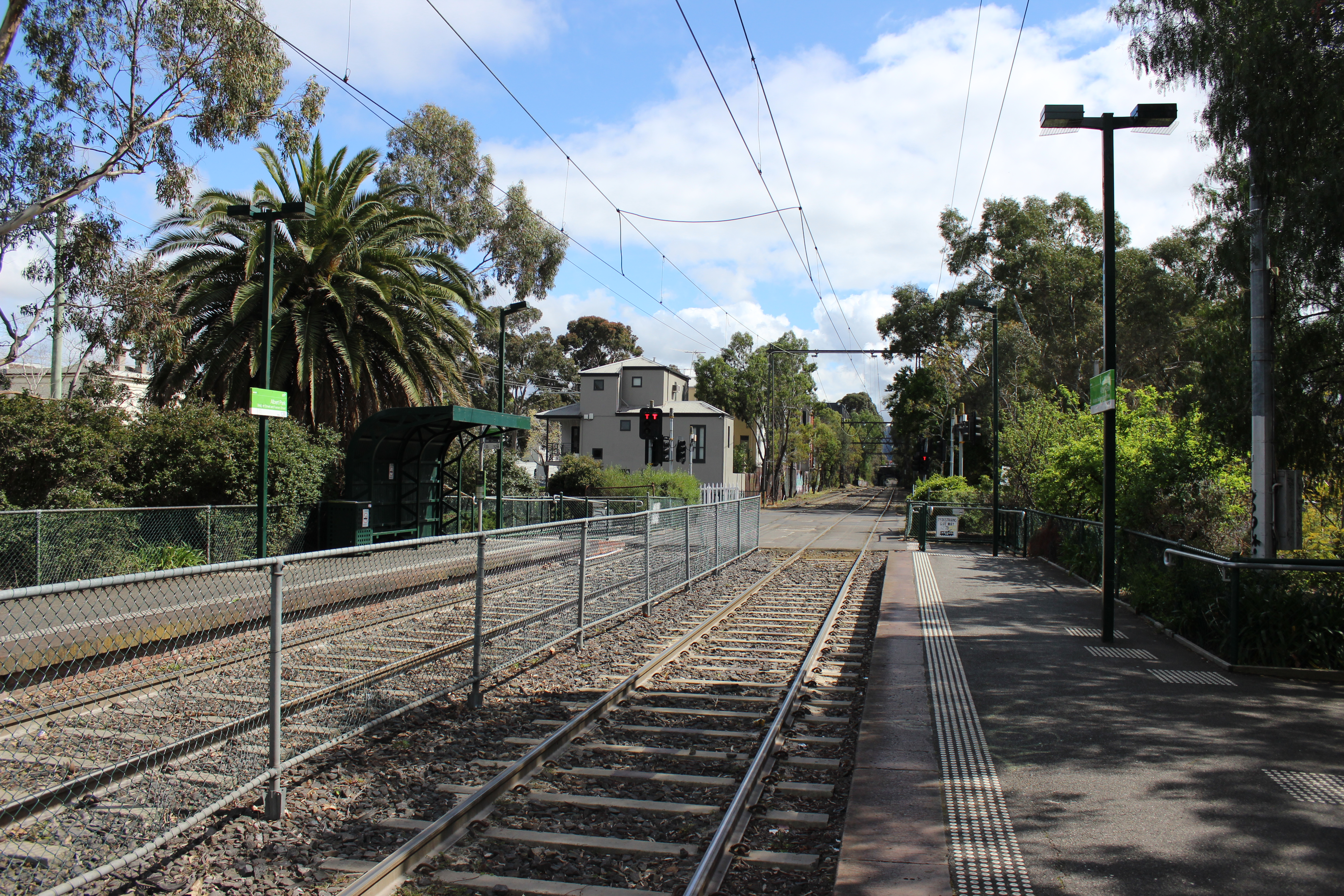
- Albert Park light rail station in October 2019

General information
- Location: South Melbourne, Victoria 3205; Australia
- Coordinates: 37.84058°S 144.958806°E
- System: PTV tram stop
- Owner: VicTrack
- Operator: Yarra Trams
- Line: St Kilda
- Platforms: 2 (2 side)
- Tracks: 2

Construction
- Structure type: At grade
- Accessible: Yes

Other information
- Status: Operational
- Station code: 128; APK (former)
- Fare zone: Myki Zone 1

History
- Opened: 27 November 1860
- Closed: 1 August 1987
- Rebuilt: 21 November 1987
- Electrified: 600 V DC overhead
- Former names: Albert Park railway station

Services
Preceding station	Yarra Trams	Following station
South Melbourne towards East Brunswick	Route 96	Melbourne Sports and Aquatic Centre towards St Kilda Beach
Former services
Preceding station	MetRail	Following station
South Melbourne towards Flinders Street	St Kilda line	Middle Park towards St Kilda
Location

Albert Park is a light rail station on the former St Kilda line, located in the Melbourne suburb of Albert Park, Victoria. The station is located on Ferrars Street just to the north of Albert Road, just minutes walk from Lakeside Stadium. A pair of low level side platforms now serve route 96 trams on the light rail line.

== History ==
Albert Park station opened in 1860, not long after the line though it was opened in 1857. It was originally known as Butts, being renamed to Albert Park in 1872. The station had a signal box on the citybound platform, which controlled the interlocked gates the Bridport Street level crossing, located at the Melbourne end of the station. An annett locked crossover also existed at the St Kilda end of the station between the two lines, being used by goods trains serving St Kilda station. The crossover was removed in 1959 when the goods service was withdrawn, and the signal box was abolished on 28 September 1960 when boom barriers were erected at the level crossing.

The St Kilda line was closed in 1987 and converted to light rail, with the route 96 tram now running through the former station. The last train service ran on 31 July 1987 with the light rail officially commissioned on 21 November in the same year. The high level platforms used by trains and the station buildings have been fenced off from public access and the up platform is now a café and a Victorian Railways antiquities museum.

== Tram services ==
Yarra Trams operates one route via Albert Park station:

- : East Brunswick – St Kilda Beach
