= St Kilda light rail station =

Tram stop in Victoria, Australia

St Kilda
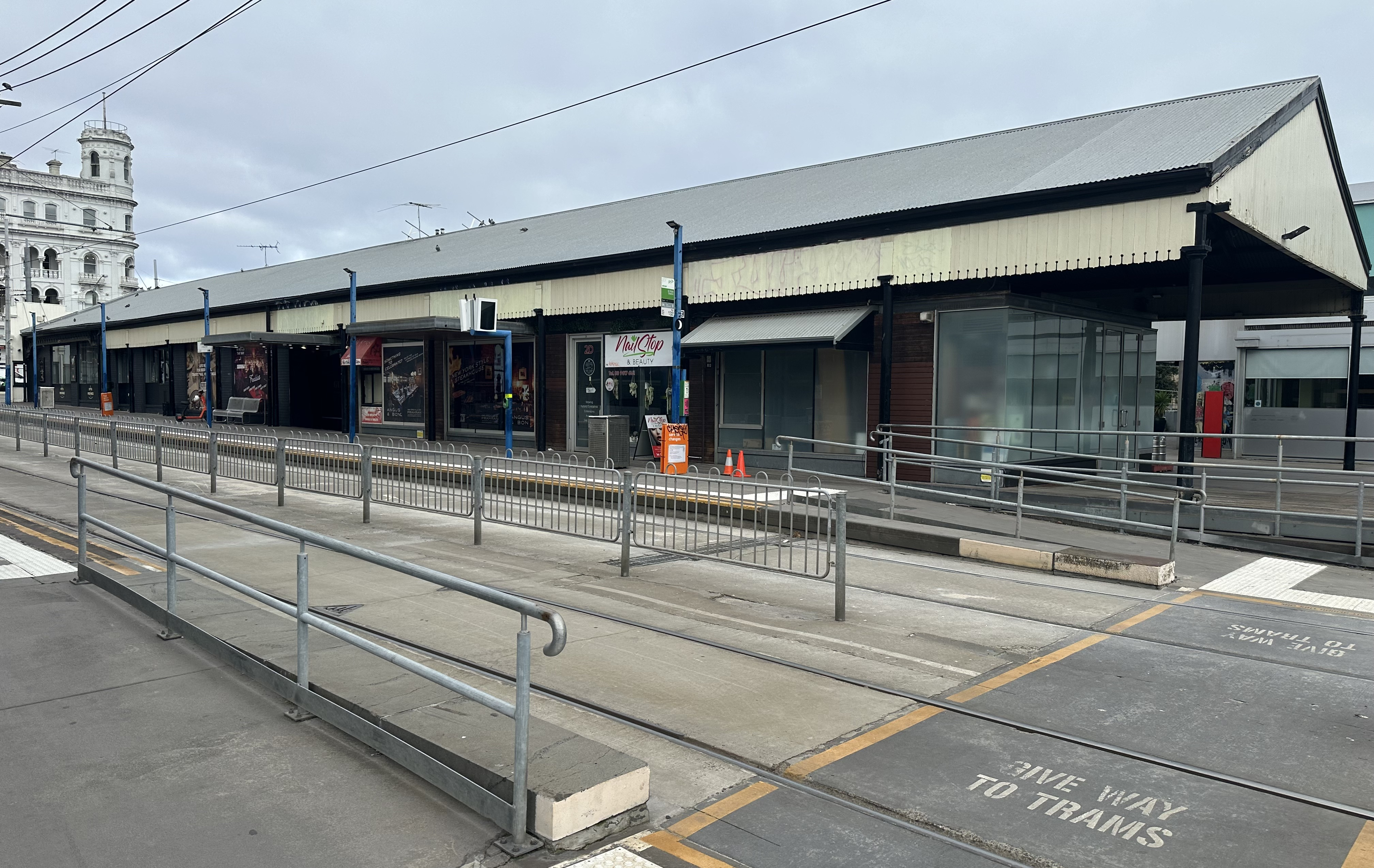
- St Kilda light rail station in July 2026

General information
- Location: St Kilda, Victoria 3182; Australia
- Coordinates: 37°51′34″S 144°58′38″E
- System: PTV tram stop
- Owner: VicTrack
- Operator: Yarra Trams
- Line: St Kilda
- Platforms: 2 (2 side)
- Tracks: 2

Construction
- Structure type: At grade
- Accessible: Yes

Other information
- Status: Operational
- Station code: 132; STK (former)
- Fare zone: Myki Zone 1

History
- Opened: 13 May 1857
- Closed: 1 August 1987
- Rebuilt: 21 November 1987
- Electrified: 600 V DC overhead
- Former names: St Kilda railway station

Services
Preceding station	Yarra Trams	Following station
Fraser Street towards East Brunswick	Route 96	Canterbury Road/Fitzroy Street towards St Kilda Beach
Former services
Preceding station	MetRail	Following station
Middle Park towards Flinders Street	St Kilda line	Terminus
Former connections
Preceding station	Disused railways	Following station
Terminus	St Kilda – Windsor link	Windsor
	List of closed railway stations in Melbourne	
Location

St Kilda is a current tram stop and former railway station, located in the Melbourne suburb of St Kilda, Australia, and was the terminus of the St Kilda railway line in the Melbourne suburban rail system. It is one of the oldest surviving railway station buildings in Victoria. The building is currently used as retail premises, while the platform serves as stop 132 on tram route 96.

== History ==
The line to St Kilda was built by the Melbourne and Hobson's Bay Railway Company, to serve tourists to the seaside resort, with tenders called for earthworks and buildings at St Kilda on 3 November 1856. The line opened on 13 May 1857.

The station building was of restrained Italianate design, with face brickwork and stucco mouldings, and originally featured a semicircular portico on its south-western side. The station had a single platform, with a train shed supported by iron columns trimmed with a timber valence. There was a bluestone retaining wall along Canterbury Road. An engine depot and carriage shed were built in 1856.

In 1859, MHBRC paid St Kilda and Brighton Railway Company £5,000 to build a loop line from St Kilda to Windsor, the line being extended to Brighton Beach by 1861, on what is now the Sandringham line. However, a more direct route from Windsor to the city was built 11 months later by the Melbourne and Suburban Railway Company, and the loop line was dismantled in 1867. In 1878, all the privately operated suburban lines were bought out by the Victorian government and included in the Victorian Railways.

Passenger numbers to the station declined by 23 percent when cable cars started operating to Brighton Road in 1888, and then between Windsor and The Esplanade in 1891, so the Victorian Railways opened their Electric Street Railway to Brighton in 1906. The line was unique, because it was laid in the broad gauge used by the railways in Victoria, rather than the standard gauge used on all other street tramways in the state. The tram terminus was alongside the station building, permitting an easy interchange between modes. Facilities at the station during the days of steam operation included a run around road and traverser, coal stage and engine shed, which remained until at least 1928. An unusual feature of the station was a connection between the railway and tramway tracks, which was used to transfer trams from the Electric Street Railway to the Newport Workshops.

The St Kilda line was electrified in 1919 and, in the 1920s, St Kilda was the second-busiest station in Victoria, after Flinders Street. On 21 October 1928, automatic signals worked by trains were provided at St Kilda, allowing the signal box at the station to be closed when freight trains were not using the yard. The yard was simplified to a platform road and four sidings in 1952, and the last goods service operated on 18 June 1959.

The St Kilda to Brighton Street railway was closed in 1959 and replaced by buses. Passenger facilities were also downgraded, with the railway refreshment rooms closed in 1969, the post office closed in 1972, and the booking hall and ladies waiting room closed in 1976. October 1978 also saw the closure of the station as a depot for train crews, with overnight stabling of trains also ceasing. In the final years of the station, only two sidings remained, and colour light signals replaced semaphores.

== Closure ==
In the 1980s, the Cain Labor Government looked at the possibility of closing several lines, or converting them to light rail services, which were perceived to be cheaper to run. After several inquiries, it was decided to close both the St Kilda and Port Melbourne lines, and convert them to light rail. The last train service ran on 31 July 1987, with the light rail officially commissioned on 21 November 1987.

The decision was made to retain the station buildings on the St Kilda line but use them for other purposes. Because it is located on busy Fitzroy Street, the St Kilda station was ideal for commercial use and was sold off. On 4 December 1989, the building was badly damaged by fire, although its structural soundness was not affected. A second fire occurred two days later.

In the late 1990s, developers announced a planned redevelopment of the station site, involving large-scale changes. Despite several protests from the National Trust of Australia and other heritage groups, the development went ahead. The Metropol Apartments were completed in the station forecourt by 2002, with the shops following soon after. The station building was converted into a number of different shops, and the entire platform space was removed. While few aspects of its original function were retained, an old cast iron platform clock remains, as evidence of the building's former use.

The station location and platform continue to be used today as stop 132 on the light rail section of tram route 96.

== Tram services ==
Yarra Trams operates one route via St Kilda station:

- : East Brunswick – St Kilda Beach

== In popular culture ==
Australian rock band Hunters & Collectors filmed the 1982 video clip for "Talking to a Stranger" at the station.

A large portion of the station building was used in the 2004 reality television series My Restaurant Rules, as the site of the Melbourne restaurant, Seven Stones.

== Gallery ==
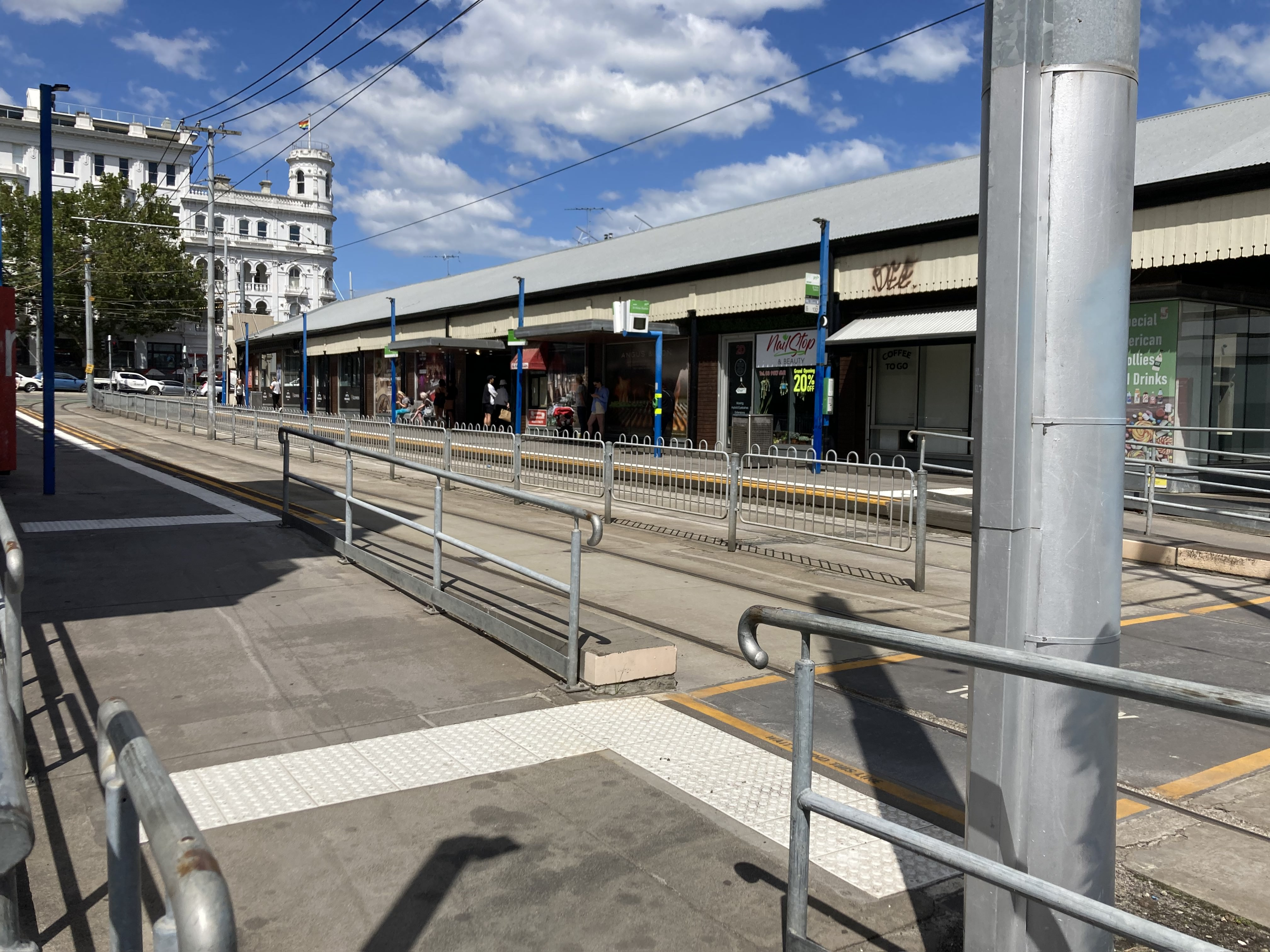
Photo taken from southbound platform

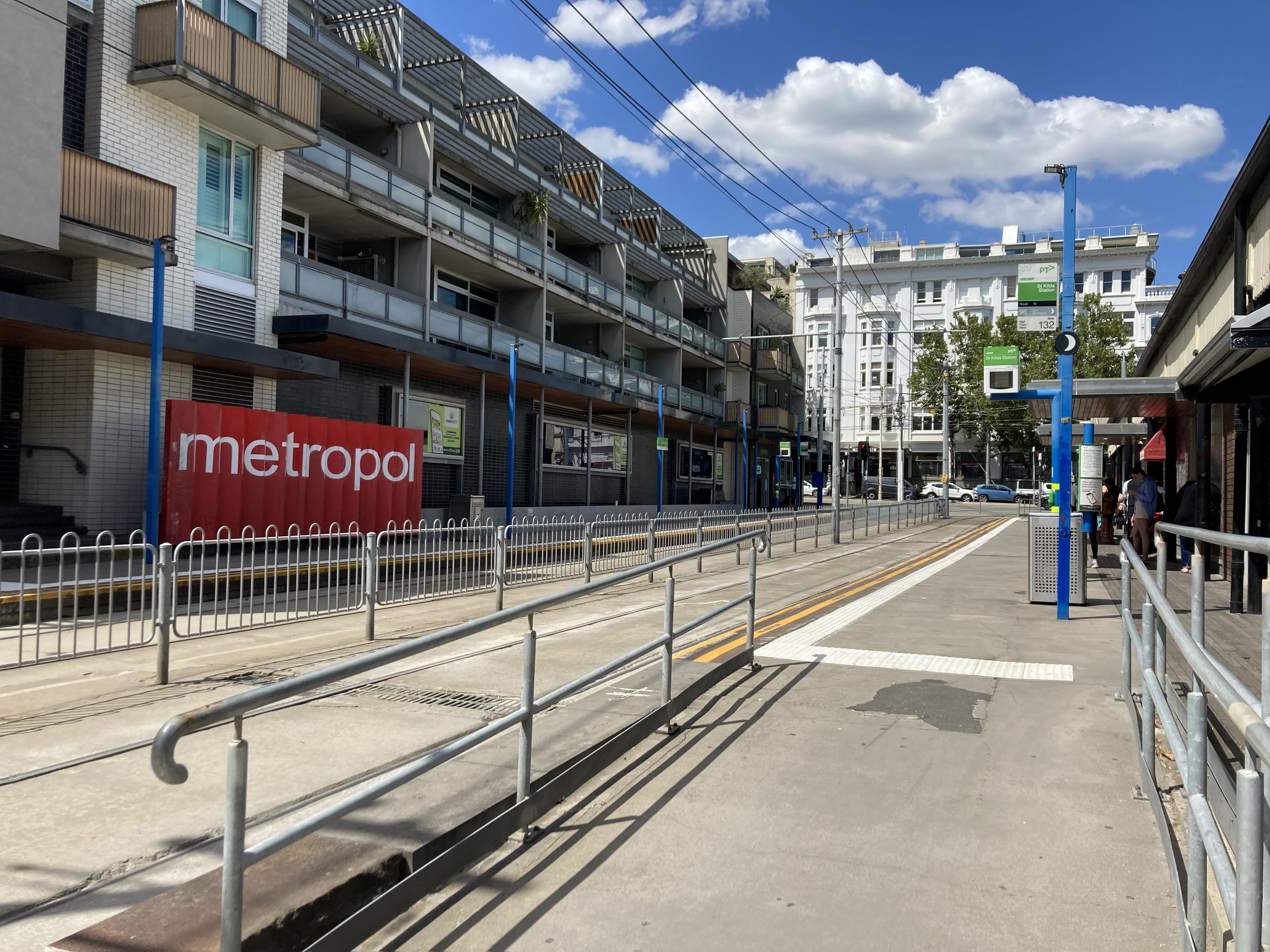
Photo taken from northbound platform
