= Middle Park, Victoria =

Middle Park
- Suburb
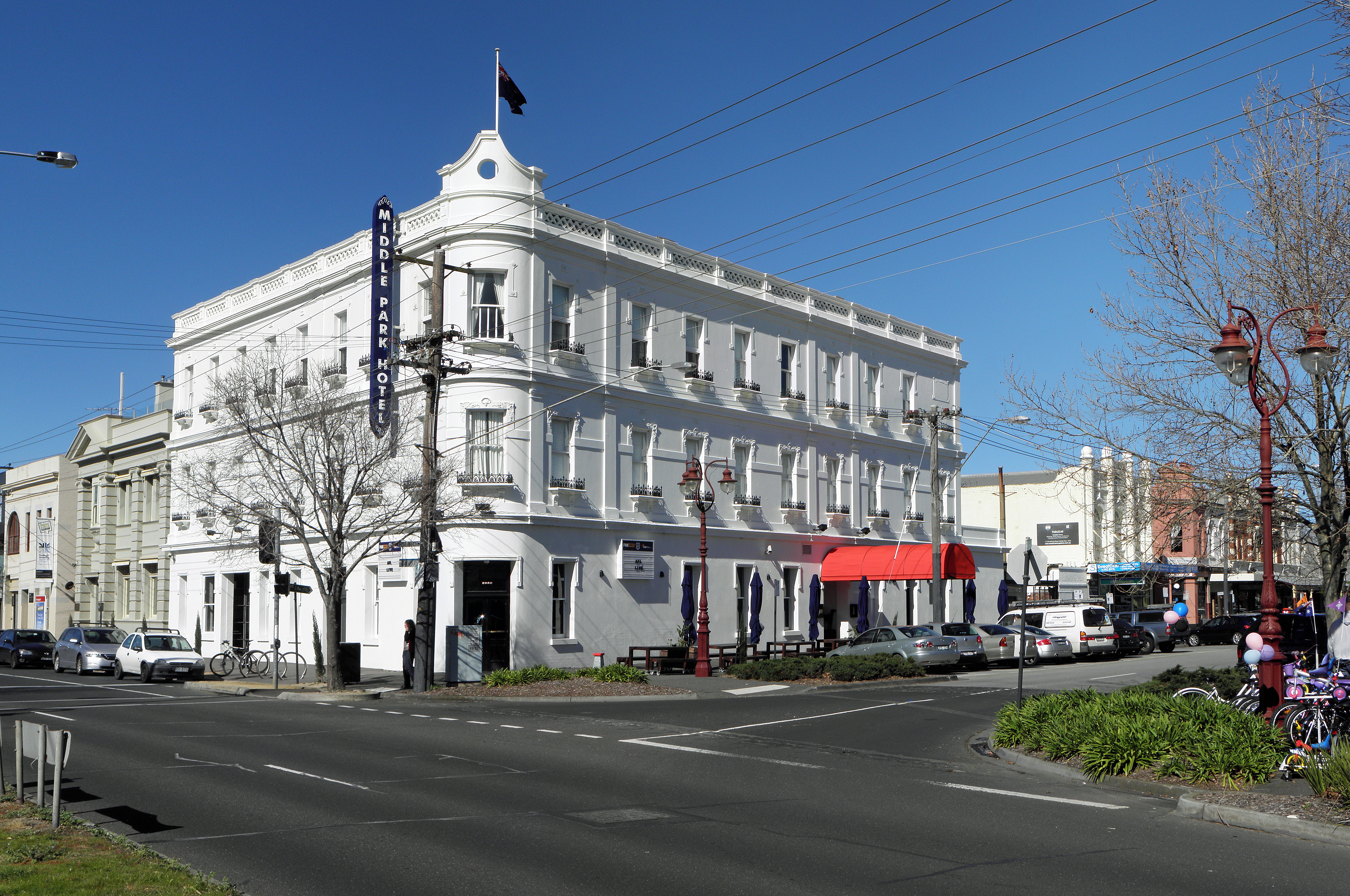
- Middle Park Hotel, on the corner of Canterbury Road and Armstrong Street

- Interactive map of Middle Park
- Coordinates: 37°51′07″S 144°57′47″E
- Country: Australia
- State: Victoria
- City: Melbourne
- LGA: City of Port Phillip
- Location: 5 km (3.1 mi) from Melbourne
- Established: 1870s

Government
  - State electorate: Albert Park
  - Federal division: Macnamara

Area
  - Total: 0.9 km^{2} (0.35 sq mi)
- Elevation: 7 m (23 ft)

Population
  - Total: 4,000 (2021 census)
  - Density: 4,400/km^{2} (11,500/sq mi)
- Postcode: 3206
Suburbs around Middle Park
Albert Park	South Melbourne	South Yarra
	Middle Park	South Yarra
Hobsons Bay		St Kilda West

Middle Park is an inner suburb in Melbourne, Victoria, Australia, 5 km south of Melbourne's Central Business District, located within the City of Port Phillip local government area. Middle Park recorded a population of 4,000 at the 2021 census.. The average house price is approximately $2.8 million. Middle Park is considered one of Melbourne's most exclusive locations.

It is located between Port Phillip and Albert Park Lake, which is about halfway across the western side of the Albert Park Reserve (a state park), hence the name "Middle" Park. It is bordered by Canterbury Road to the east, Mills Street to the north, Fraser Street to the south and Beaconsfield Parade to the west.

Middle Park, along with neighbouring Albert Park, contains many preserved terrace house and Victorian architecture in Melbourne and is part of a strict heritage-conservation area. Many of the terraces line Canterbury Road, along the former railway line, which now has several more tram light rail stops since it was converted to tram use in 1987. Others are along the main shopping street, Armstrong Street. The fine old buildings and development restrictions in the area and new developments are generally sympathetic to the prevailing style, driving up real-estate prices dramatically, in marked contrast with neighbouring St Kilda. Middle Park property is tightly held, contributing to its prestigious reputation.

== Demographics ==
In Middle Park 71.0% of people were born in Australia. The most common countries of birth were England 5.1%, Greece 3.2%, New Zealand 2.5%, Italy 1.1% and United States of America 1.1%.

== Landmarks ==
- Middle Park Hotel is a large Victorian hotel building on the corner of Canterbury Road and Armstrong Street. Built in 1889, it features wrought-iron lacework. The building was modified in the 1950s: decorative urns were removed, new doors were added, and windows were bricked up. Following a refurbishment in 2001, it was renamed the Gunn Island Brew Bar Hotel, in a reference to the island within nearby Albert Park Lake. Following another refurbishment in 2009, the hotel resumed trading under its original name. It provides bars, dining and accommodation facilities. It had a further refurbishment in early 2020. It is the only hotel in Middle Park.
- The Carmelite Roman Catholic Church was built in November 1891 by the Carmelites. It is a red and buff brick building with cement facings, built in Gothic style with a tall belfry at the south-east corner. The church features a large pipe organ to accompany the singing of High Mass on Sunday mornings. It is the only Christian church in Middle Park as all the Protestant churches closed over the last few decades. The Carmelite Library located in the Carmelite Hall holds Australia's finest collection of books in the area of spirituality and mysticism.
- Middle Park Primary School opened on the corner of Richardson and Wright streets in 1887, with an initial enrolment of 600 students. The heritage school buildings are classified by the National Trust. The school has a relatively small catchment area bound by Kerferd Road, Beaconsfield Parade, Langridge Street and Canterbury road, with an extra section bound by Ferrars Street, Bridport Street into Albert Road and along Queens Road.

== Transport ==
Middle Park is served by tram route 12 which runs along Danks and Mills Streets, as well as route 96 which runs parallel to Canterbury Road on the former St Kilda train line corridor. Kinetic Melbourne bus route 606 from Fishermans Bend to Elsternwick also runs through Middle Park. Port Phillip City Council also lays on a regular community bus linking the town halls, libraries, community centres and shopping facilities.

== Notable former and current residents ==
- Thomas Ashworth (1864–1935) – publicist, property developer, benefactor; Ashworth Street named after him
- Albert Aughtie (1872–1944) – South Melbourne city engineer between 1901 and 1942; responsible for many public works projects in the area; Aughtie Drive named after him
- William Carter (unknown dates) – an old and respected resident who conducted a florist's business and hot-house in Ferrars Street opposite the South Melbourne railway station; Carter Street named after him.
- Frank Crean (1916–2008) – Former federal parliamentarian. Treasury and Deputy PM during the latter period of the 1972–75 Whitlam ALP government.
- Simon Crean (1949–2023) – died of a heart attack in Germany on a business trip. Former federal parliamentarian. Opposition Leader 2001-03. Son of Frank Crean.
- John Danks (1828–1902) – businessman, manufacturer, councillor, benefactor; Danks Street named after him
- Ernest Roy England (1896–1978) – 1st AIF soldier noted for his heroic feats during World War One [birthplace]
- Alexander Fraser (1802–1888) – businessman, councillor, politician; Fraser Street named after him
- Renée Geyer (1953–2023) – singer, highly regarded in R&B/Jazz/Soul genres; ARIA Award winner and Hall of Fame inductee. Died of lung cancer.
- Alistair Knox (1912–1980) – mudbrick house designer and builder, born and grew up in Middle Park
- Jim Mellas (born 1962) – barrister, commentator, campaigner and activist for the return of the Parthenon Marbles
- Robert McGregor (1825–1883) – politician; born in Scotland; founded the first secondary school in South Melbourne; McGregor Street named after him
- Robert Mills (1826–1911) – hotelier, estate agent, councillor, mayor; born in Ireland; Mills Street named after him
- James Neville (1861–1942) – architect, councillor; born in Port Melbourne; Neville Street named after him
- John Nimmo (1819–1904) – surveyor, businessman, councillor; born in Scotland; first city surveyor of Emerald Hill; involved in the separation of Emerald Hill from the Melbourne City Council in May 1855; Nimmo Street named after him
- James Page (1835–1912) – auctioneer and estate agent; was one of the first residents of Emerald Hill; Page Street named after him
- Esther Paterson (1892–1971) – artist, illustrator, cartoonist; her works are shown at the Australian War Memorial Canberra and The National Gallery of Victoria
- Guy Pearce (born 1967) – actor, musician; breakout acting role was 'Mike Young' in the Australian television series Neighbours. Pearce sold his two Middle Park houses, that are next to each other, in 2023 and moved to Netherlands with his Dutch actress partner.
- Robert Wright (1838–1912) – builder, councillor, mayor; Wright Street named after him.
- The Parker Sisters (Pat (1918–2009) Marie (1920–1979) & Eula (1923–1985) – Singer/ songwriters, WW2 Australian radio and live entertainers – they modelled their style on the Boswell Sisters.

== Gallery ==
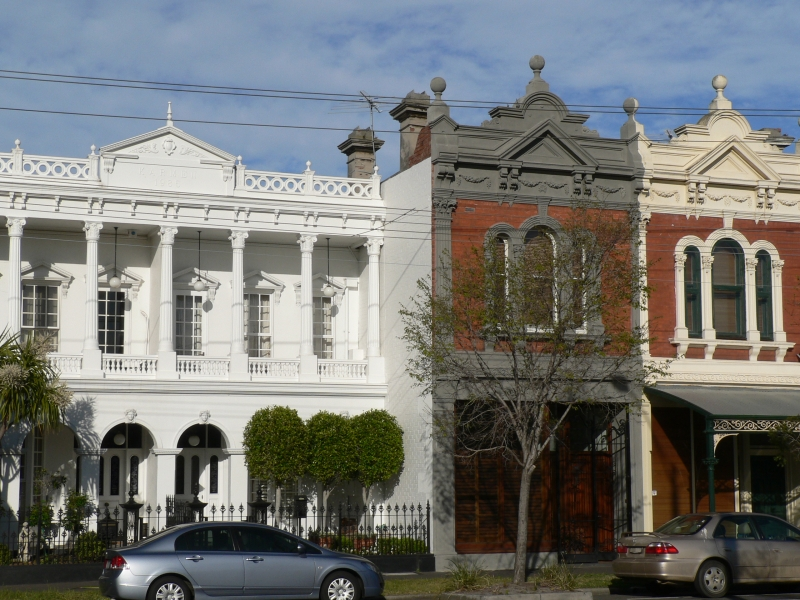
Victorian terrace houses in Middle Park

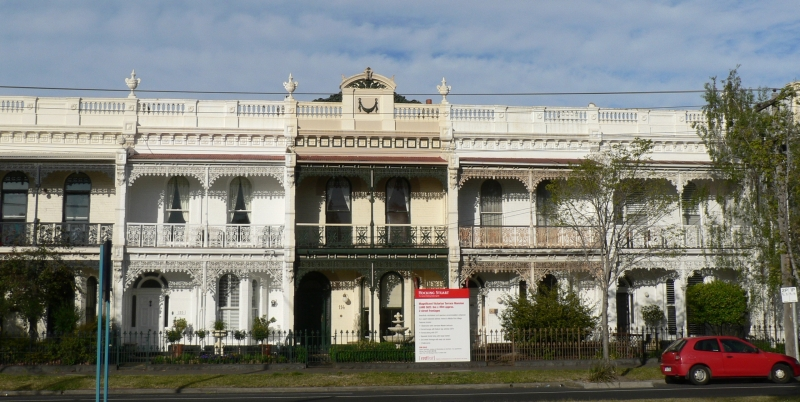
Victorian terraces on Canterbury Road

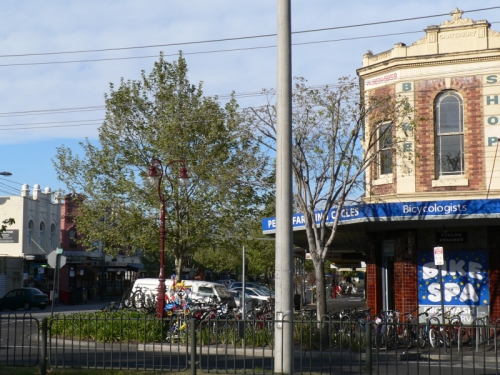
View of Armstrong Street from Canterbury Road

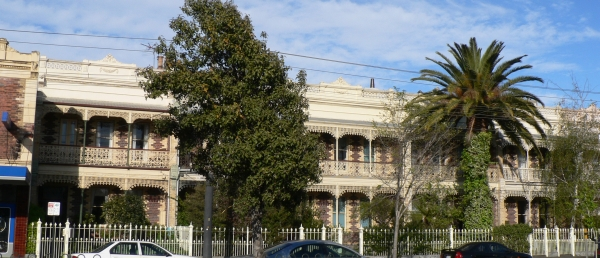
Polychrome Victorian terraces on Canterbury Road

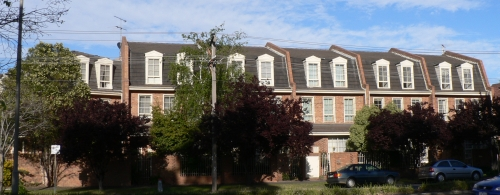
Nostalgic post modern townhouses on Canterbury Road designed to fit the overall feel of the area after original Lanark Terrace demolished by developers

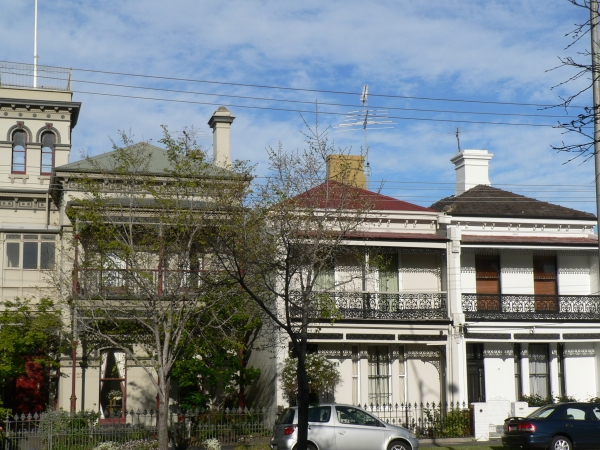
Semi-detached Victorian homes on Canterbury Road

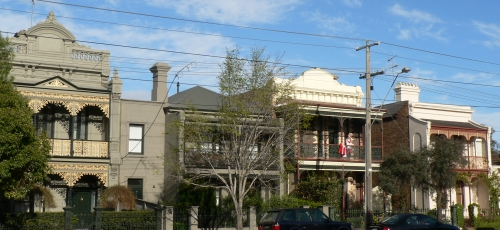
Semi-detached terraces on Canterbury Road

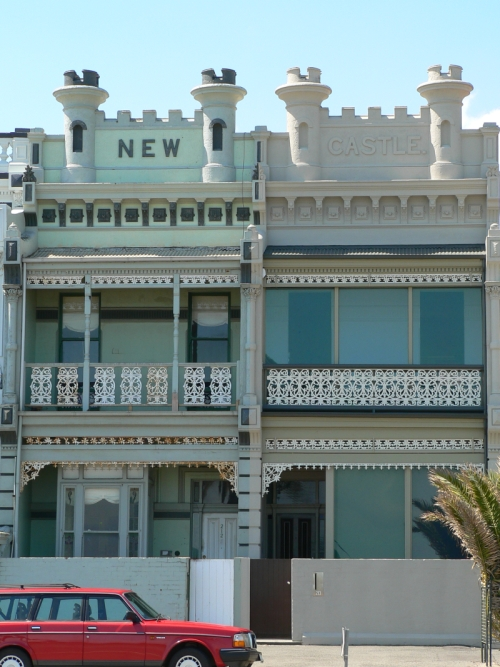
New castle Terrace, Beaconsfield Parade

== See also ==
- City of South Melbourne – Middle Park was previously within this former local government area.
