= St Kilda railway line =

Former railway line in Melbourne, Australia

St Kilda

Overview
- Status: Converted to tram route 96
- Former connections: Link to Windsor, Port Melbourne line
- Stations: 5

Service
- Type: Melbourne suburban service

History
- Opened: 13 May 1857
- Closed: 31 July 1987

Technical
- Line length: 4.5 kilometres
- Num of tracks: Double track

The St Kilda line was a suburban commuter railway line in Melbourne, Victoria, Australia. Operated by MetRail at the time of its closure, the line ran for 4.5 kilometres (3 miles) from Flinders Street to St Kilda.

In 1987, the line was closed and converted to light rail alongside the Port Melbourne line. It now forms part of tram route 96, which operates on the converted track between Clarendon Street Junction and Fitzroy Street.

== History ==
The line was opened by the Melbourne and Hobson's Bay Railway Company in 1857. It ran for 4.5 kilometres from the Melbourne (or City) Terminus (on the site of modern-day Flinders Street station), crossing the Yarra River via the Sandridge Bridge, to branch off from the Port Melbourne line and after stopping at three stations along the line – South Melbourne, Albert Park, Middle Park – ending at St Kilda.

For a short time early in the line's history, there was a short connection provided to the then Brighton line at Windsor, however this link was removed shortly after the direct link was provided to Bay Street from Richmond. The line was taken over by the Government of Victoria in 1878, to become part of Victorian Railways. The line was electrified in 1919.

Prior to the opening of the City Loop in 1981, all services were timetabled to through run from Flinders Street towards Sandringham. After 1981, all services terminated at Flinders Street on either platforms 10 or 11.

=== Closure ===
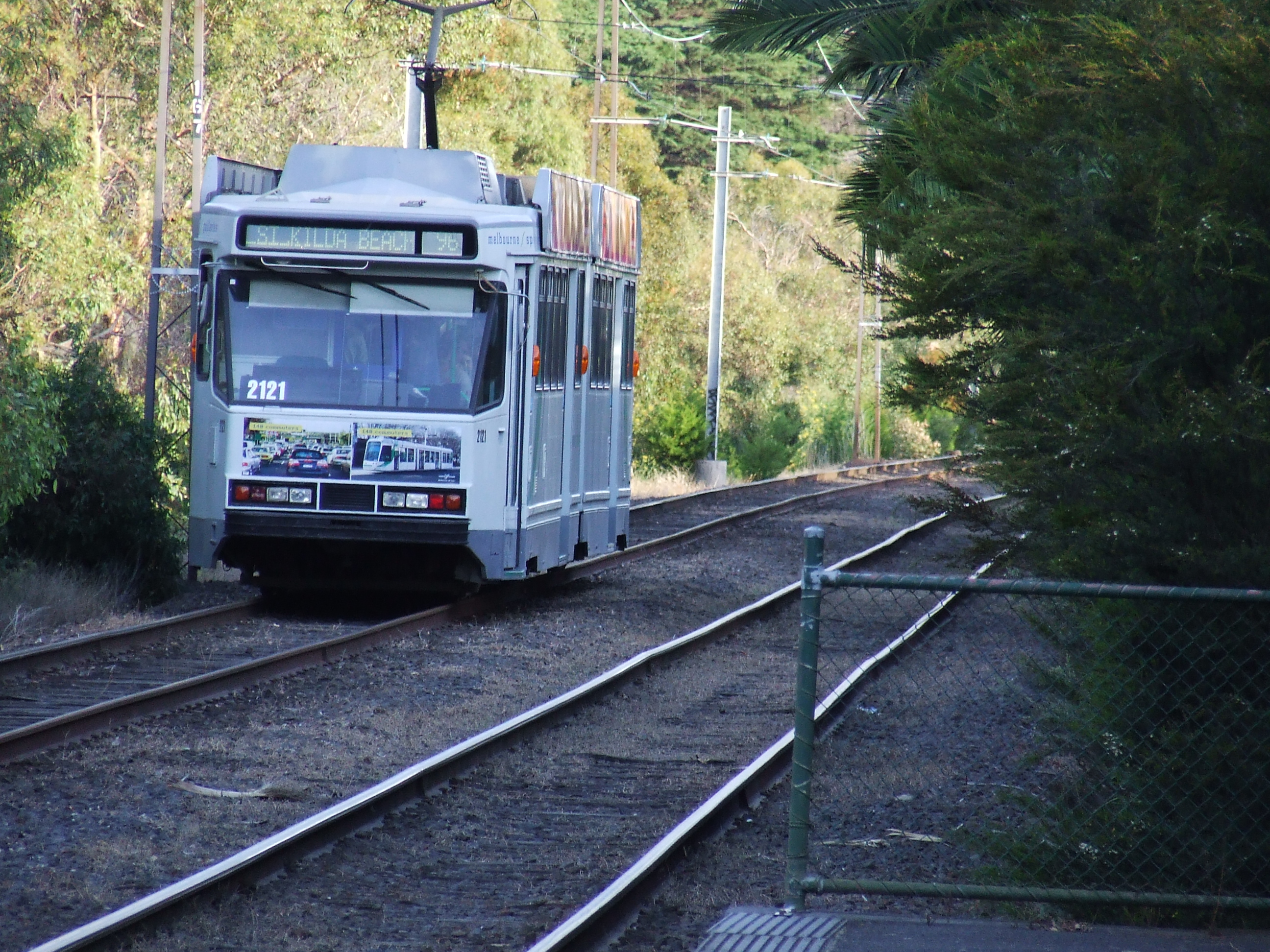
B-class Melbourne tram on route 96

The line was originally to be closed in 1981, and replaced with buses as recommended in the Lonie Report. Plans were sufficiently advanced for Melbourne-Brighton Bus Lines to have taken delivery of six Volgren bodied Volvo B10M buses before it was decided to retain the rail service following much opposition to its closure.

Along with the Port Melbourne line, the conversion of the line to light rail was first announced on 13 January 1983, by the Victorian state government. Cost estimates at the time was around $6 million.

The line was officially closed on 31 July 1987, and reopened as part of the Melbourne tram network on 21 November 1987.

Melbourne tram route 96 now operates on the converted track. The section from Southbank Junction to St Kilda was converted to light rail, requiring the conversion from 1,600 mm (5 ft 3 in) broad gauge used by the Melbourne rail network to 1,435 mm (4 ft 8 1/2 in) standard gauge tram track as well as reducing the overhead voltage from 1,500 V DC to 600 V DC required for the trams. The new tram route now continues down Fitzroy Street and the Esplanade to terminate at Acland Street.

== Network and operations ==
=== Stations ===
St Kilda line
Station	Image	Suburb	Opened	Terrain	Time (Note: Travel time in minutes from Flinders Street.)
Flinders Street		Melbourne CBD	12 September 1854	Ground	0
South Melbourne		South Melbourne	16 September 1858	Ground	
Albert Park		Albert Park	27 November 1860	Ground	
Middle Park		Middle Park	2 July 1883	Ground	
St Kilda		St Kilda	13 May 1857	Ground	
