= Albert Park, Victoria =

Albert Park
- Suburb
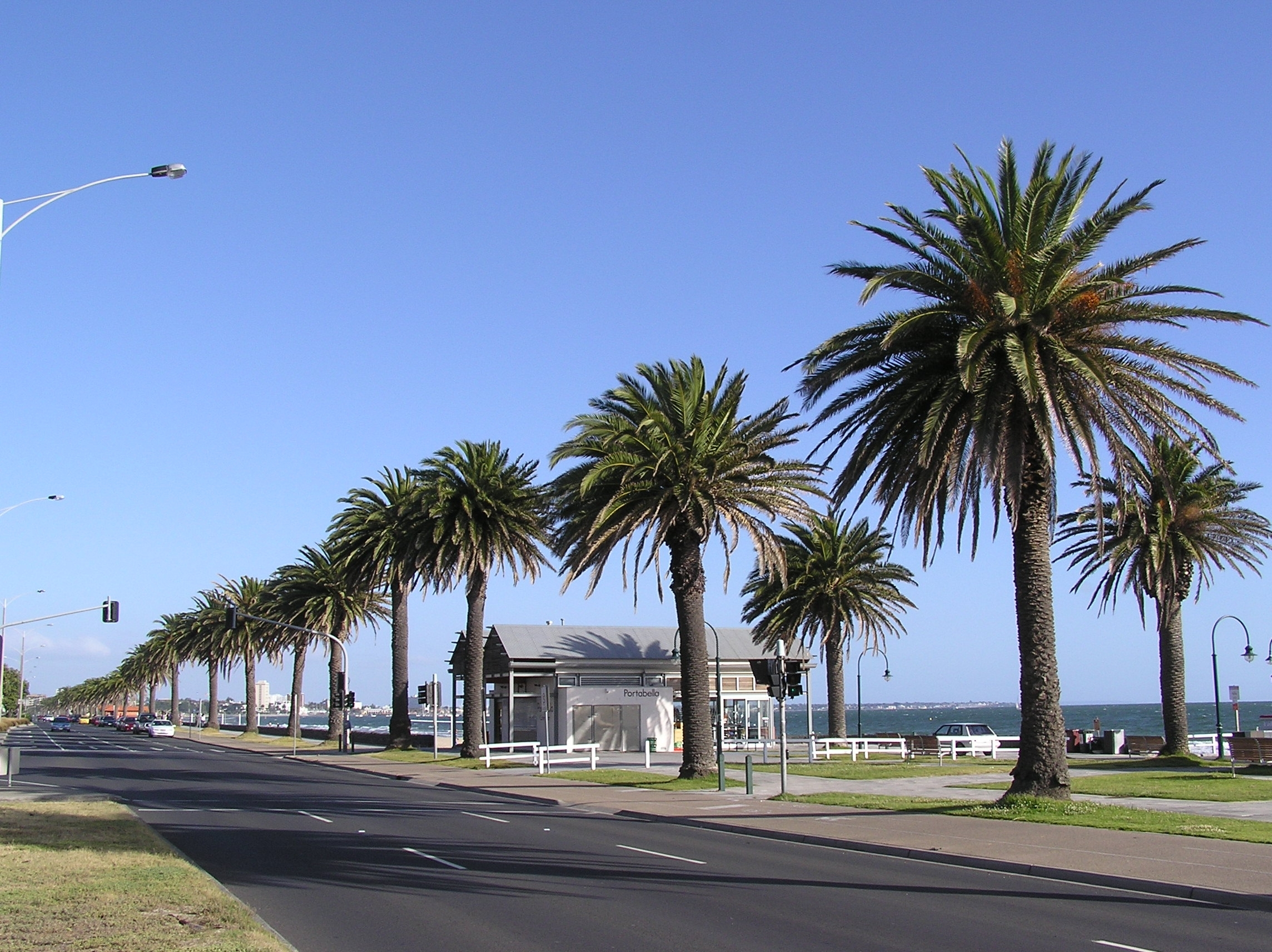
- Albert Park foreshore, near Beaconsfield Parade

- Interactive map of Albert Park
- Coordinates: 37.842°S 144.950°E
- Country: Australia
- State: Victoria
- City: Melbourne
- LGA: City of Port Phillip
- Location: 4 km (2.5 mi) from Melbourne
- Established: 1860s

Government
  - State electorate: Albert Park
  - Federal division: Macnamara

Area
  - Total: 3.2 km^{2} (1.2 sq mi)
- Elevation: 6 m (20 ft)

Population
  - Total: 6,044 (2021 census)
  - Density: 1,889/km^{2} (4,890/sq mi)
- Postcode: 3206
Suburbs around Albert Park
Port Melbourne	South Melbourne	Melbourne
Port Melbourne	Albert Park	Melbourne
	Middle Park	Middle Park

Albert Park is an inner suburb of Melbourne, Victoria, Australia, 4 km (2.5 mi) south of Melbourne's Central Business District. The suburb is named after Albert Park, a large lakeside urban park located within the City of Port Phillip local government area. Albert Park recorded a population of 6,044 at the 2021 census.

The suburb of Albert Park extends from the St Vincent Gardens to Beaconsfield Parade and Mills Street. It was settled residentially as an extension of Emerald Hill (South Melbourne). It is characterised by wide streets, heritage buildings, terraced houses, open air cafes, parks and significant stands of mature exotic trees, including Canary Island date palm and London planes.

The Albert Park Circuit has been home to the Australian Grand Prix since 1996, with the exception of 2020–2021 due to the COVID-19 lockdowns.

== History ==
Indigenous Australians first inhabited the area that is now Albert Park around 40,000 years ago. The area was a series of swamps and lagoons. The main park after which the suburb was named was declared a public park and named in 1864 to honour Queen Victoria's consort, Prince Albert.

Albert Park was used as a garbage dump, a military camp and for recreation before the artificial lake was built. In 1854 a land-subdivision survey was done from Park Street, South Melbourne, to the northern edge of the parkland (Albert Road). St Vincent Gardens were laid out and the surrounding streets home to the city's most successful citizens. Street names commemorated Trafalgar and Crimean War personalities.

St Vincent Gardens in 1878, Rochester Terrace is in the background

Kerferd Road Pier (1905)

Heritage Victoria notes that Albert Park's St Vincent Gardens "is historically important as the premier 'square' development in Victoria based on similar models in London. It is significant as the largest development of its type in Victoria and for its unusual development as gardens rather than the more usual small park" and "was first laid out in 1854 or 55, probably by Andrew Clarke, the Surveyor-General of Victoria. The current layout is the work of Clement Hodgkinson, the noted surveyor, engineer and topographer, who adapted the design in 1857 to allow for its intersection by the St Kilda railway line. The precinct, which in its original configuration extended from Park Street in the north to Bridport Street in the south and from Howe Crescent in the east to Nelson Road and Cardigan Street in the west, was designed to emulate similar 'square' developments in London, although on a grander scale. The main streets were named after British naval heroes. The development of the special character of St Vincent Place has been characterised, since the first land sales in the 1860s, by a variety of housing stock, which has included quality row and detached houses and by the gardens which, although they have been continuously developed, remain faithful to the initial landscape concept."

St Vincent's is a garden of significant mature tree specimens. It is registered with the National Trust and is locally significant for the social focus the gardens provide to the neighbourhood. Activities in the park range from relaxing walks, siestas to organised sports competition. The Albert Park Lawn Bowls Club was established in 1873 and the Tennis Club established 1883, on the site of an earlier croquet ground.

== Geography ==
Albert Park features part of the massive Albert Park and Lake (formerly South Park in the 19th century until it was also renamed after Prince Albert) and is located nearby. It is a significant state park managed by Parks Victoria. It is also known as the site of the Albert Park Circuit.

=== Commercial centres ===
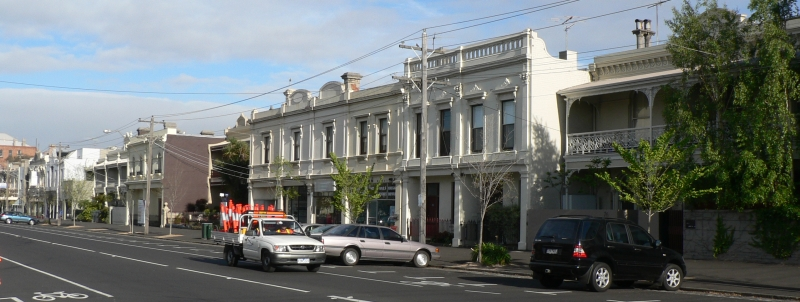
Shops and terrace houses along commercial Bridport Street

Commercial centres include Bridport Street, with its cafes and shops and Victoria Avenue, known for its cafes, delicatessens and boutiques.

=== Beach areas ===
Albert Park has a long beach frontage, with several distinctive features, including many grand buildings (such as the Victoria Hotel, a grand hotel and former coffee palace, now café bar, built in 1887) and Victorian terrace homes; Kerferd Kiosk, an iconic Edwardian bathing pavilion and Kerferd Pier, which terminates Kerferd Road and is a jetty onto Port Phillip, used for fishing by many and sharks have occasionally been found around it.

=== Albert Park and Lake ===
The lake is popular with strollers, runners and cyclists. Dozens of small yachts sail around the lake on sunny days. Only the north eastern part of the park and lake is actually in the suburb, the rest is in the neighbouring suburbs of South Melbourne, Melbourne, Middle Park and St Kilda.

== Demographics ==
At the 2021 census, Albert Park had a population of 6,044. 69.8% of people were born in Australia. The next most common countries of birth were England 5.3%, Greece 3.5% and New Zealand 2.1%. 78.2% of people only spoke English at home. Other languages spoken at home included Greek at 7.3%. The most common responses for religion were No Religion 46.4% and Catholic 19.0%.

== Housing ==
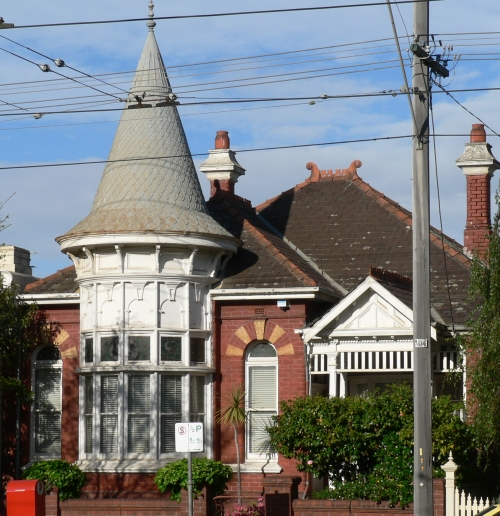
Albert Park has prominent examples of Victorian and Edwardian housing

Albert Park is composed mainly of Victorian terrace and semi-detached housing. Many residential areas are in heritage overlays to protect their character. Boyd Street, a leafy backstreet near Middle Park, is a fine example of this.

== Transport ==
Beaconsfield Parade is the main beachside thoroughfare, between St Kilda and Port Melbourne, which runs along the Port Phillip foreshore. Richardson Street and Canterbury Road follows a similar inland route south to St Kilda. The main road arterial is Kerferd Road, a wide boulevard lined with elm trees and a central reservation, which connects from South Melbourne's Albert Road. Pickles Street, Victoria Avenue and Mills Street are the main roads running west and east toward South Melbourne.

Several tram routes service Albert Park; Route 1 along Victoria Avenue, Route 12 along Mills Street and Route 96 on a reservation parallel to Canterbury Road.

Until 1987, Albert Park was serviced by the St Kilda railway line, with Albert Park railway station being located at Bridport Street. The line has since been converted to serve trams, and forms a large part of the Route 96 tram line.

CDC Melbourne's Route 606 runs through the suburb. There are segregated cycle facilities along the beach and Canterbury Roads, with marked bicycle lanes elsewhere.

== Sport ==
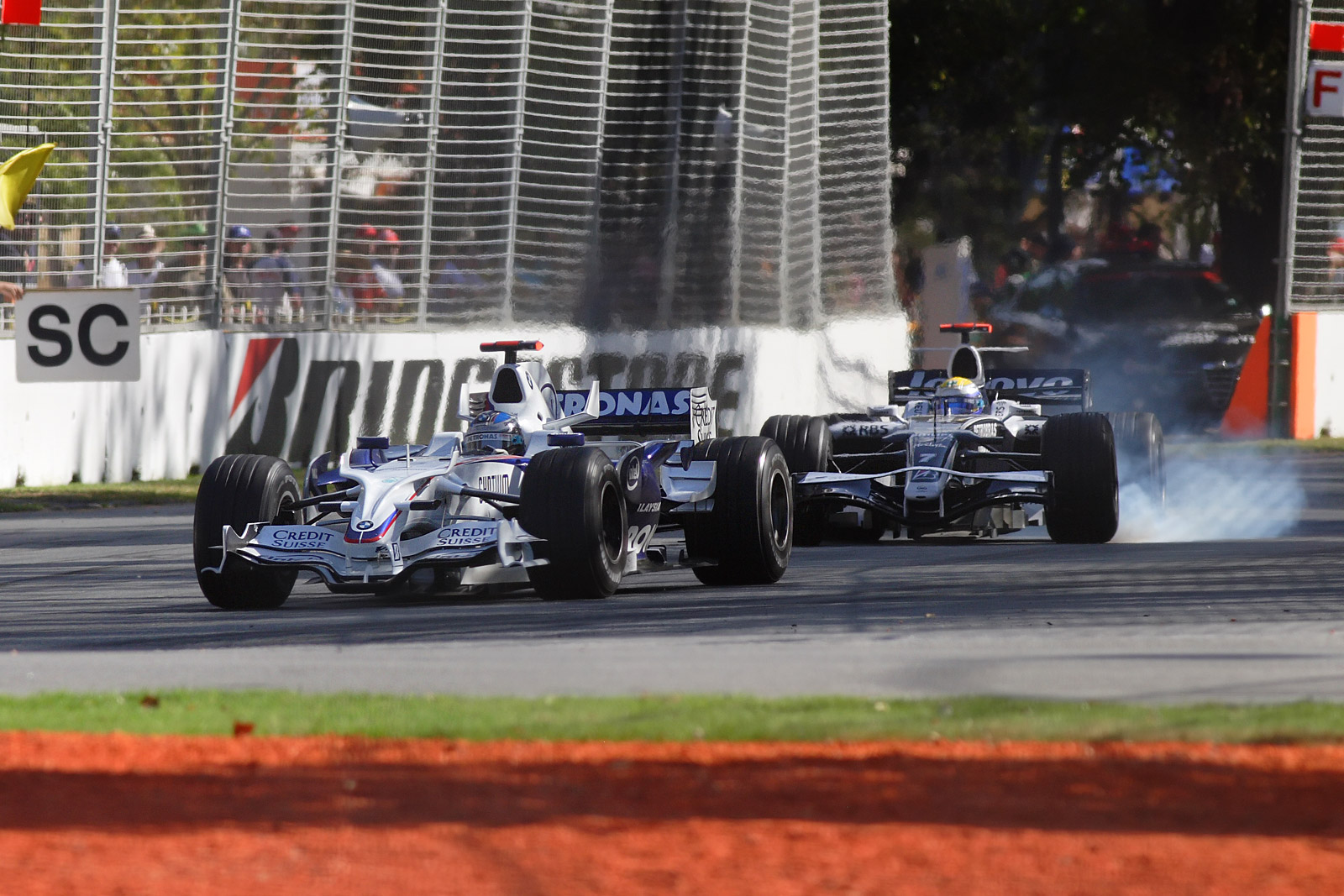
Nick Heidfeld and Nico Rosberg racing at the 2008 Australian Grand Prix

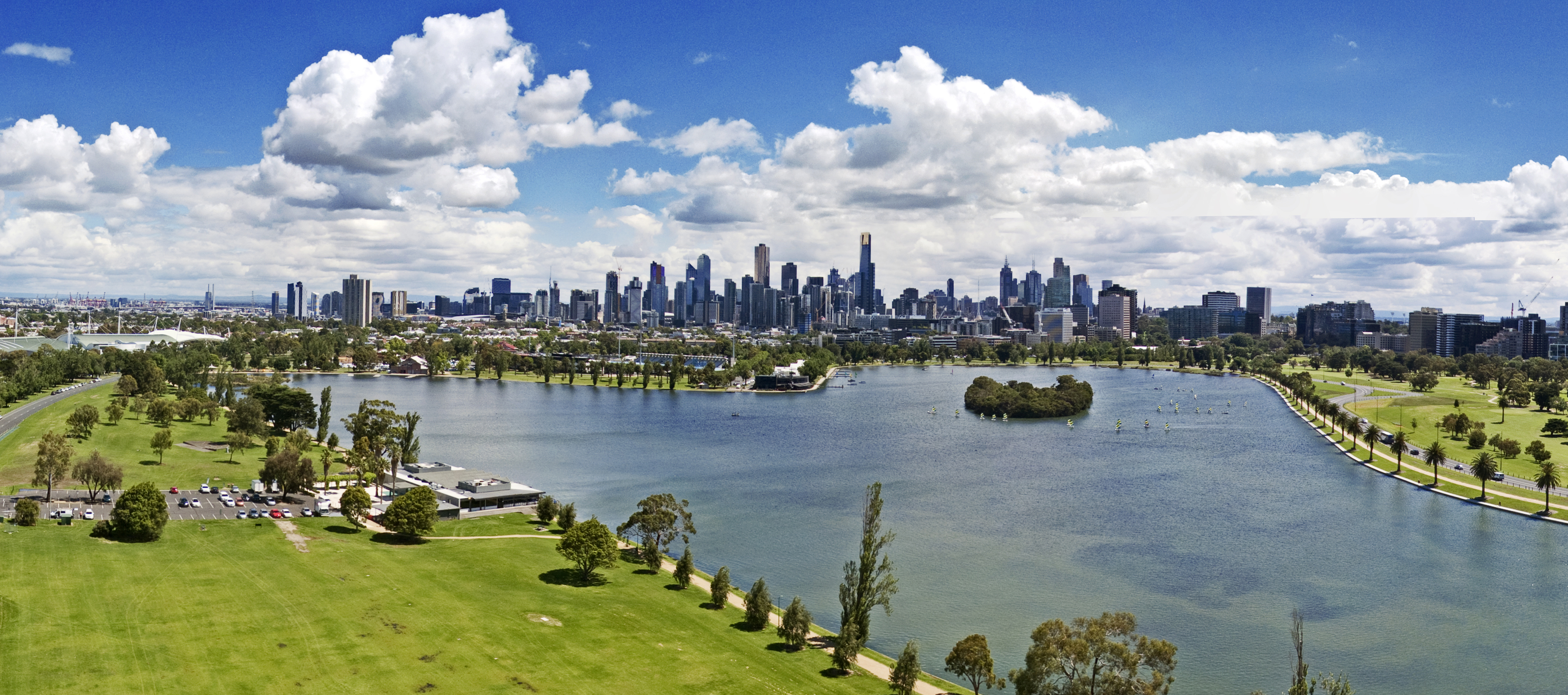
Aerial perspective of Albert Park Lake

The Albert Park Circuit layout (2021–present)

The Albert Park Circuit layout (1996–2020)

The suburb has been home to the Formula One Australian Grand Prix since 1996. The Albert Park Circuit runs on public roads. The choice of Albert Park as a Grand Prix venue was controversial, with protests by the Save Albert Park group. In preparing the Reserve for the race existing trees were cut down and replaced during landscaping, roads were upgraded, and facilities were replaced. Both major political parties support the event. The Melbourne Supercars Championship is also held on the same circuit.

Albert Park is the home of soccer club South Melbourne FC who play out of Lakeside Stadium; aptly named due to its positioning next to Albert Park Lake. Lakeside Stadium (known then as Bob Jane Stadium) was redeveloped in 2010 to include an international standard athletics track, as well as new grandstands and administrative facilities, and is also the home of the Victorian Institute of Sport. The stadium was built on the site of the old Lake Oval, which was an historic Australian rules football venue for the South Melbourne Football Club.

The Melbourne Sports & Aquatic Centre (MSAC) is a large swimming centre, which hosted squash, swimming, diving events and table tennis during the 2006 Commonwealth Games. The MSAC is also the home of the Melbourne Tigers that play in the NBL1 South.

In December 2006 polo returned to Albert Park Reserve after an absence of 100 years.

Albert Park is home to a parkrun event. The event at Albert Park is held at 8am every Saturday and starts in the Coot Picnic area, opposite the MSAC.

== Notable residents ==
- Hilda and Laurel Armstrong – 'The Vegemite Girls', sisters who coined the name of the iconic Australian food spread in 1923
- Mae Busch (1891–1946) – actress, co-star in the films of famous Hollywood comedy duo Laurel and Hardy
- Roy Cazaly (1893–1963) – Australian rules football legend [birthplace]
- Noel Jack Counihan (1913–1986) – artist and revolutionary, made social realist art in response to the political and social issues of his times
- John Danks (1828–1902) – businessman, manufacturer, councillor, benefactor; Danks Street named after him
- Private Edward "Eddie" Leonski [US Army] (1917–1942) – infamous serial killer; during World War II was stationed in Melbourne and murdered three women. Was hanged for the crimes on 9 November 1942. His first victim, Ivy McLeod, was found beaten and strangled in a doorway in Albert Park, killed by Leonski after he drank whisky all morning and afternoon at the Bleak House Hotel (aka Beach House Hotel)
- Walter Lindrum (1898–1960) – world-famous billiards player, regarded as the greatest ever to play the game
- Likely Herman "Like" McBrien (1892–1956) – leading Australian Rules football administrator and politician
- Ernest McIntyre (1921–2003) – Australian rules footballer [birthplace]
- Allan McLean (1840–1911) – pastoralist, station agent, politician; 19th Premier of Victoria in 1899; elected to the first Commonwealth Parliament in 1901
- Albert Monk (1900–1975) – union and labour leader; during World War Two was concurrent president of the ACTU & Trades Hall Council & ALP Victorian branch; seminally influenced the growth of the ACTU as Australia's peak trade union organization. His house was in Kerferd Road
- King O'Malley (1858–1953) – politician, influential in the establishment of the Commonwealth Bank and the selection of Canberra as the national capital
- Alex Lahey, singer-songwriter and multi-instrumentalist who was born and raised in Albert Park

== See also ==
- City of South Melbourne – Albert Park was previously within this former local government area.
