= Sport in Tasmania =

Overview of sports traditions and activities in Tasmania

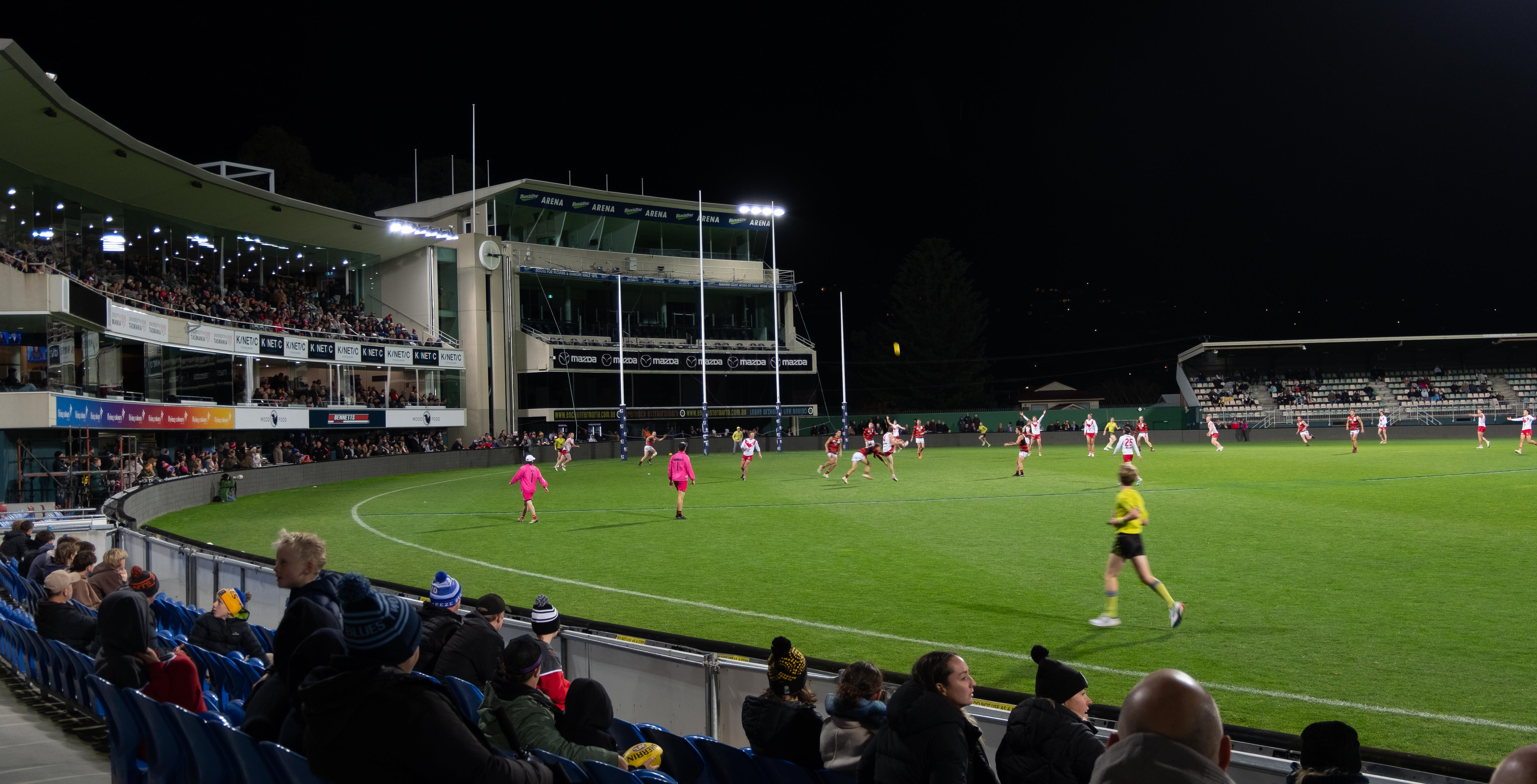
Clarence vs Lauderdale in a TSL football match at Bellerive Oval, 2024.

Sport is a significant aspect of the culture on the island state of Tasmania, Australia. According to participation data, common organized sports in Tasmania include swimming, athletics, cycling, golf and Australian rules football. Netball ranks as the most popular team sport for female participation, while cricket leads among male participants. The most widely played team sport is soccer, with an estimated 36,773 Tasmanians, comprising 6.8% of the state's population, participating annually.

In 2009, Tasmania's most watched sports were Australian rules football, motor sports and horse racing, however there has been a sharp increase in basketball attendance since the addition of the Tasmania JackJumpers in the National Basketball League commencing in the 2021–22 NBL season. Other current professional franchises in national competitions include the Tasmania cricket team, the Hobart Hurricanes (Big Bash League) and the Tassie Tigers (Hockey One). The Tasmania Football Club was founded in 2022 and is set to compete in the Australian Football League (AFL) from the 2028 season. A-League expansion in Tasmania has been proposed since the establishment of the A-League in 2005. Major sporting events on the Tasmanian calendar are the Royal Hobart Regatta, Hobart International, Hobart Cup, Tasmanian Derby, Targa Tasmania and the conclusion of the Sydney to Hobart Yacht Race in Hobart.

According to the 2023 Sports Australia AusPlay survey, 78% of Tasmanian adults and 33% of Tasmanian children engage in some form of sport or physical activity at least once per week. While adult participation is on par with the national average, figures for child participation are significantly below the national average of 52%.

In the fiscal year 2020/21, the Tasmanian Government allocated nearly $2,000,000 (AUD) in funding for organised sports, primarily focusing on Australian rules football, basketball, cricket, rugby, and soccer. Additionally, $1,000,000 (AUD) has been earmarked for a participation program aimed at children, with supplementary grants and funding opportunities also available.

== Bat-and-ball games ==
=== Baseball ===
Baseball Tasmania is the governing body of baseball in the Australian Baseball Federation. The first Australian championships were held in Hobart in 1910 between Tasmania, Victoria and New South Wales, and won by the latter. The sport became more structured with the formation of the Tasmanian Baseball Association in 1950. Although the sport saw significant growth during the 1970s and mid-1980s, the Launceston League disbanded by the late 1980s due to declining player numbers. The Tasmanian Baseball Association operated until the early 1990s before financial issues led to its collapse.

A revival began in the early 2000s, partly due to the involvement of former players in Masters baseball. In 2007, baseball returned to Hobart under the name Baseball Tasmania, which was later rebranded as the Hobart Summer Baseball League in the 2013/14 season. The league season runs from mid-October to mid-March, with games held at Prince of Wales Bay Recreation Ground and other locations. The league expanded from four to five teams in 2013/14 and has actively participated in the Victorian Masters Baseball Carnival.

=== Cricket ===
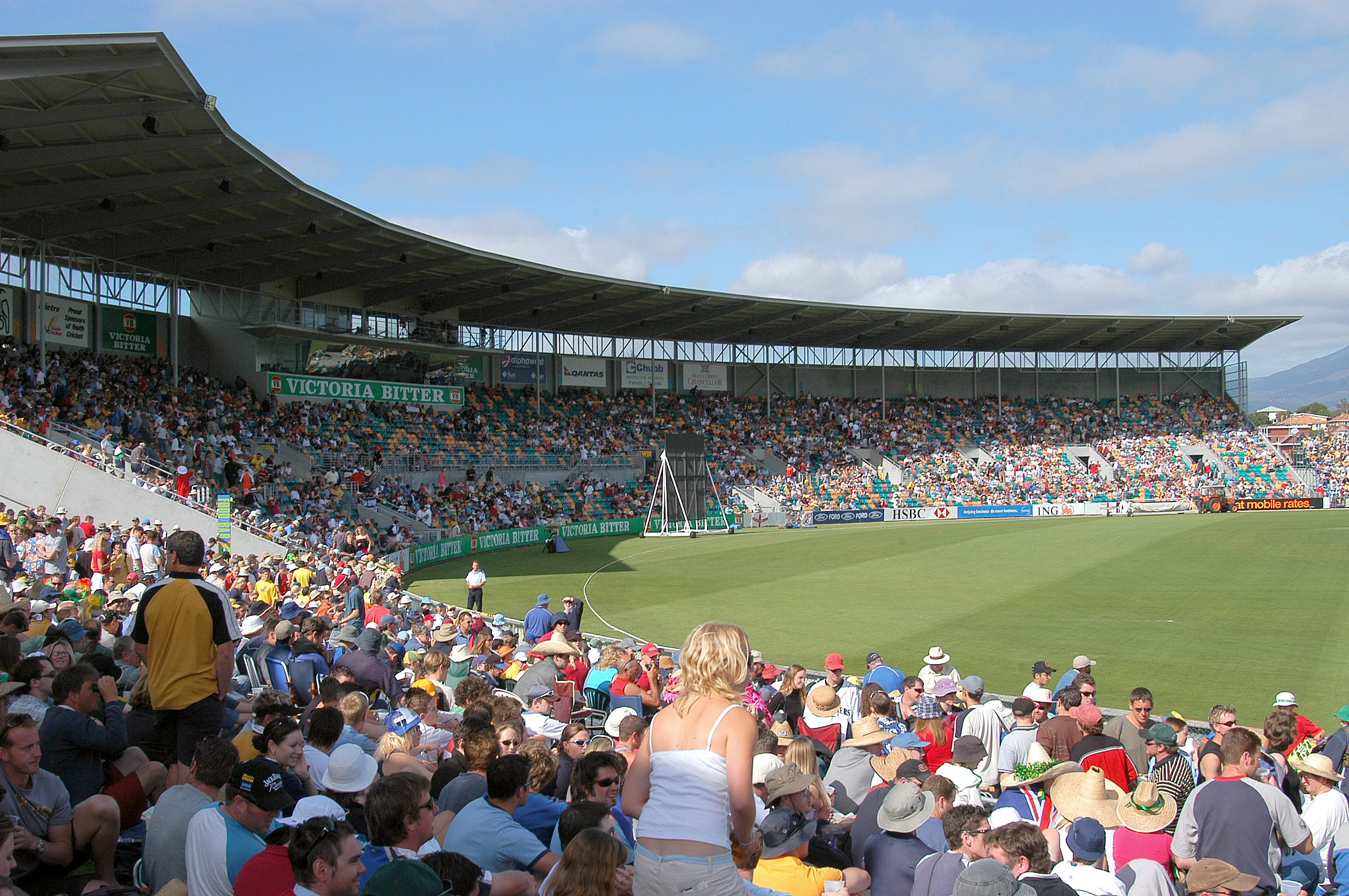
England vs Australia at Bellerive Oval in Hobart, 2005

Tasmania is an integral part of Australian cricket. Prominent players from Tasmania include David Boon, Charles Eady, John Marshall, Laurie Nash, and Ricky Ponting.

Cricket Tasmania administers the Tasmanian Grade Cricket competitions of cricket in Tasmania, and selects the players for the Tasmanian Tigers, who are the state's first class cricket team for men. They are also responsible for the selection of players for Tasmanian Roar, the state's women's representative side. The Tasmanian Tigers are based at Bellerive Oval and represent the state in domestic competitions such as the One-Day Cup and Sheffield Shield. Blundstone Arena also hosts international matches (Tests and One Day matches) of the Australian cricket team and touring sides.

Tasmania's cricketing history is reflected in its diverse range of venues, from historic grounds like the NTCA Ground (established in 1851) and TCA Ground (established in 1882) to contemporary stadiums like Blundstone Arena and University of Tasmania Stadium. These venues have been instrumental in fostering the growth of cricket in the state and continue to host important matches and events.

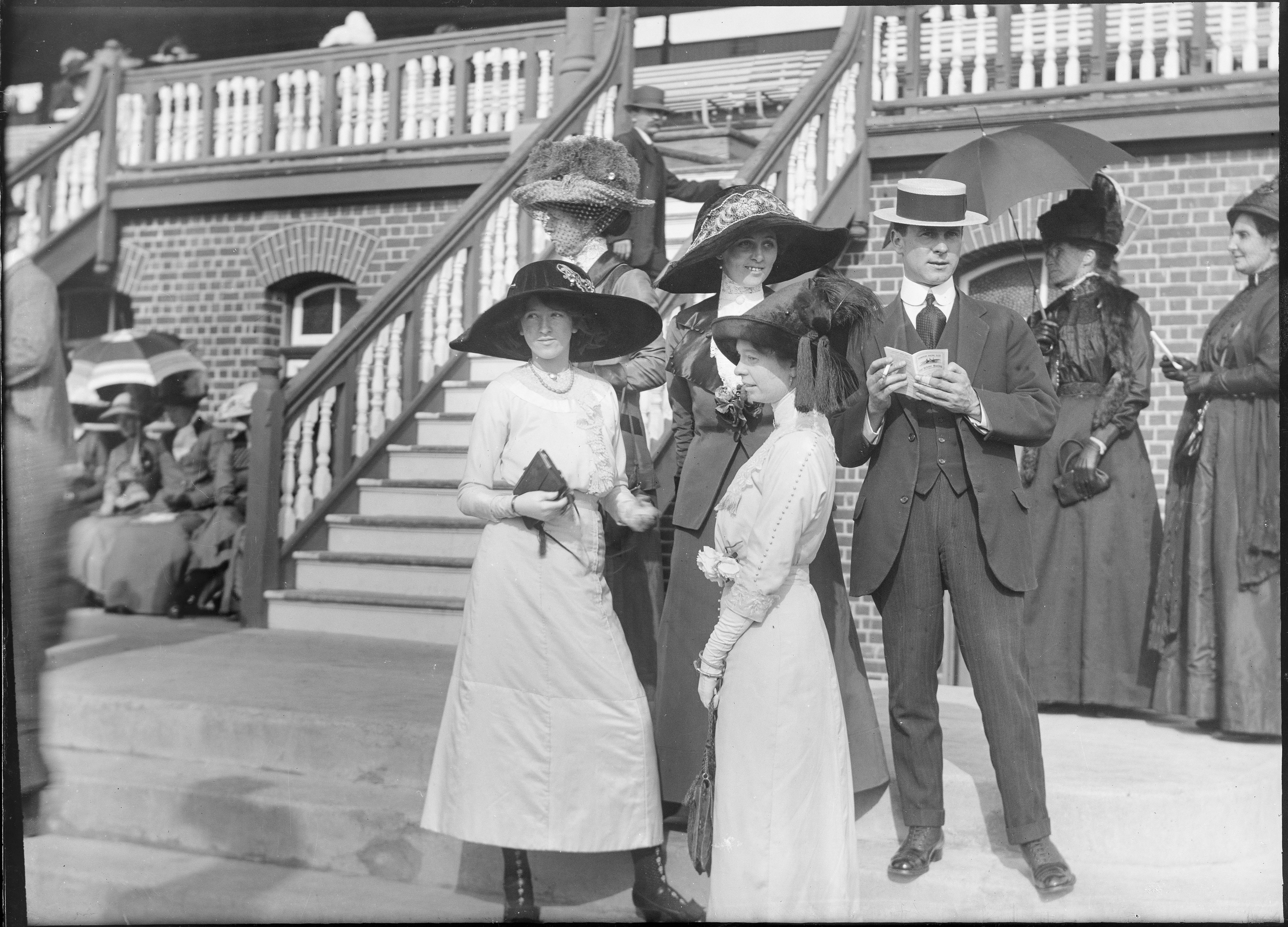
Spectators at the TCA Ground, Queens Domain, Hobart, circa 1900s

Cricket likely arrived in Van Diemen's Land with its earliest settlers. The Rev. Robert Knopwood mentioned the game in a diary entry from 1814, and it was well established in Hobart and Launceston by the 1820s. By the 1830s, cricket was played in various settlements across the island. Clubs in Hobart and Launceston soon followed. In 1851, Van Diemen's Land won Australia's first intercolonial match against the Port Phillip District.

Although English touring teams included the Colony of Tasmania in the following years, matches were often uneven, with Tasmania fielding extra players to level the competition. These early matches were sporadic and largely informal compared to modern standards. Regular eleven-a-side matches with mainland colonies resumed in 1889, but Tasmania was left out of early efforts to form a national cricket administration in the 1890s.

Throughout the late 19th and early 20th centuries, Tasmanian cricket developed steadily, though the team faced challenges due to geographic isolation and limited opportunities for competitive play against other colonies. Economic difficulties constrained Tasmanian cricket until after the Second World War, and attempts to join national competitions in the 1930s were unsuccessful. It wasn't until the 1977-78 season that Tasmania was admitted into the Sheffield Shield on a full-time basis, allowing the team to compete regularly against other states in Australia's premier domestic competition. The inclusion in the Sheffield Shield marked a significant turning point for Tasmanian cricket. It led to improvements in infrastructure, player development, and overall competitiveness.

==== First-class and List A cricket ====
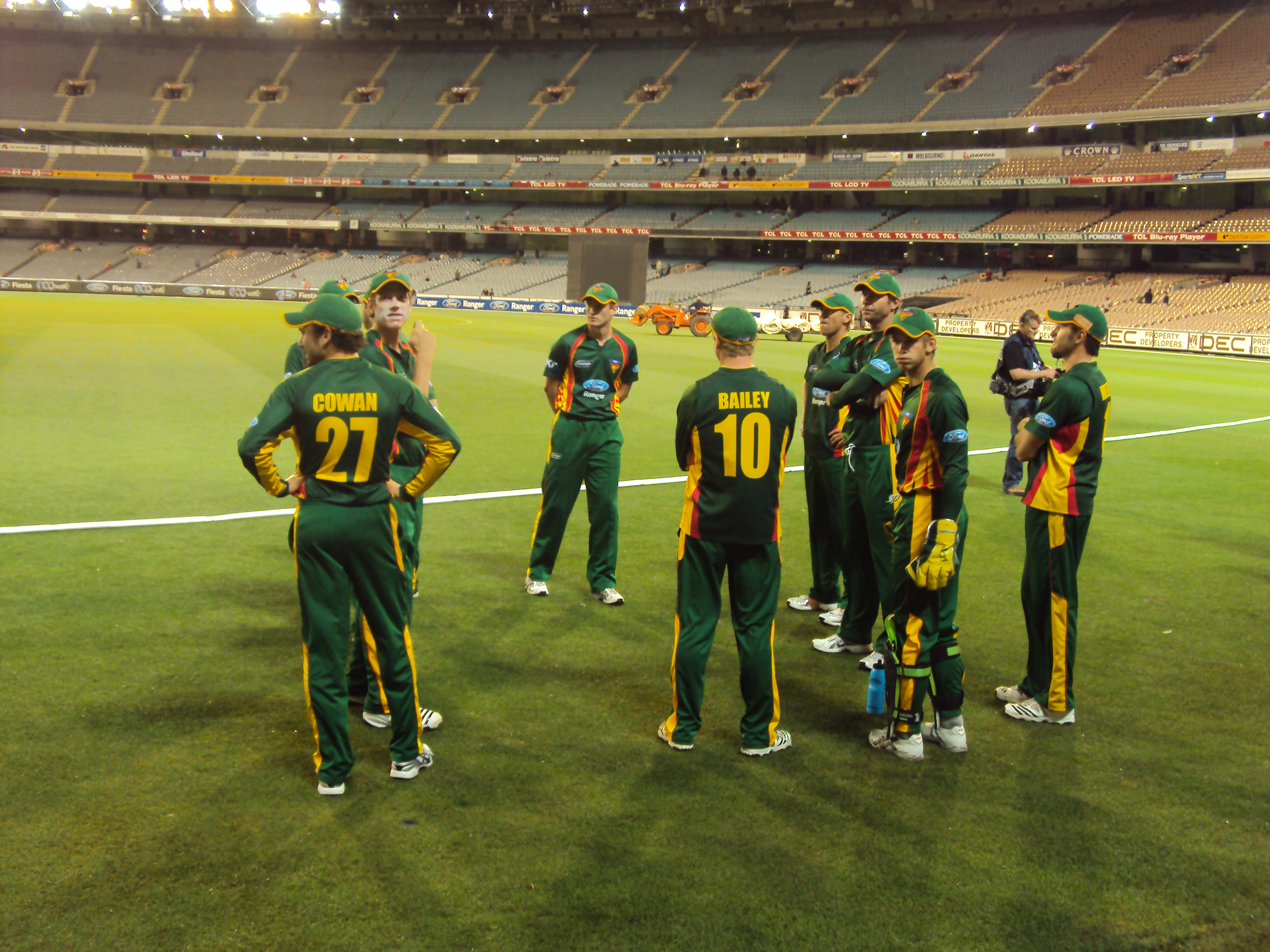
The Tasmanian Tigers at the 2009-10 Ford Ranger Cup Final

The Tasmanian Tigers have achieved significant success in the 21st century, winning multiple Sheffield Shield and One-Day Cup titles. They have produced several prominent cricketers who have excelled both domestically and internationally, maintaining their status as a competitive force in Australian domestic cricket. Tasmania has won the Sheffield Shield three times (2006-07, 2010-11, 2012-13) and have finished as runners-up on several occasions, most recently in the 2023–24 Sheffield Shield season. The Tigers have won the One-Day Cup domestic one-day competition four times (1978-79, 2004-05, 2007-08, 2009-10).

Historical players include David Boon, known for his solid batting at the international level, Ricky Ponting, one of the greatest batsmen in cricket history, Shane Watson, an all-rounder who has had a significant impact both domestically and internationally, George Bailey, a reliable middle-order batsman and former captain of both Tasmania and the Twenty20 Australia national cricket team, and James Faulkner, an all-rounder known for his contributions in limited-overs cricket. Current key players include Matthew Wade, Ben McDermott, Peter Siddle, Beau Webster and former captain of the Australia national cricket team, Tim Paine.

==== Twenty20 ====
Established in 2011, the Hobart Hurricanes and Hobart Hurricanes (WBBL) represent Tasmania in the KFC Big Bash League and, since 2015, in the Women's Big Bash League respectively.

The Hurricanes men’s side have featured prominently in several campaigns, driven by key players such as D'Arcy Short—BBL Player of the Tournament in 2017–18 and 2018–19—Ben McDermott, Matthew Wade, Jofra Archer and Riley Meredith. Their early high points included BBL03 (2013–14), when they reached the final, BBL07 (2017–18), highlighted by Short’s record run-scoring, and BBL08 (2018–19), where they topped the regular-season table.

The breakthrough finally came in BBL14 (2024–25), when local all-rounder Mitchell Owen blasted a 39-ball century to steer Hobart to a seven-wicket victory over the Sydney Thunder in the final at Bellerive Oval on 27 January 2025, delivering the club’s maiden BBL championship.

Another breakthrough came in WBBL 11 (2025-26), when Lizelle Lee blasted 77-runs off 44-balls to steer Hobart to an eight-wicket victory over the Perth Scorchers at Bellerive Oval on 13 December 2025, delivering the club’s maiden WBBL championship.

=== Softball ===
Softball, introduced to Tasmania from Melbourne in the late 1940s, grew in popularity from 56 teams in 1976 to 216 in 1984, with the first softball-only facility built in 1984. Softball Tasmania is the governing body of softball in Tasmania. Simmone Morrow is the island's best known player, serving as a member on the national team and collecting a silver medal for Australia at the 2004 Summer Olympics.

=== Vigoro ===
Tasmania is one of the three traditional Australian states to play Vigoro. The Brooks Vigoro Club in the north of Launceston was founded in 1977 by Margie Stewart.

== Court and hoop games ==
=== Basketball ===
Tasmania has hosted multiple teams in Australia's top basketball tiers, yet instability has been a recurring challenge. Contributing factors include limited financial resources, difficulties in attracting and retaining top talent due to Tasmania's geographical isolation, and fluctuating fan support. Historically, league restructuring has also affected Tasmanian teams and the island's ability to retain homegrown talent. Before the establishment of the National Basketball League (NBL) in 1979, Tasmania produced several notable players, such as Nita Burke, who from 1956 represented Australia six times internationally in the women's national basketball team, and John Maddock, who competed in the men's national basketball team at the 1976 Summer Olympics.

==== National Basketball League ====
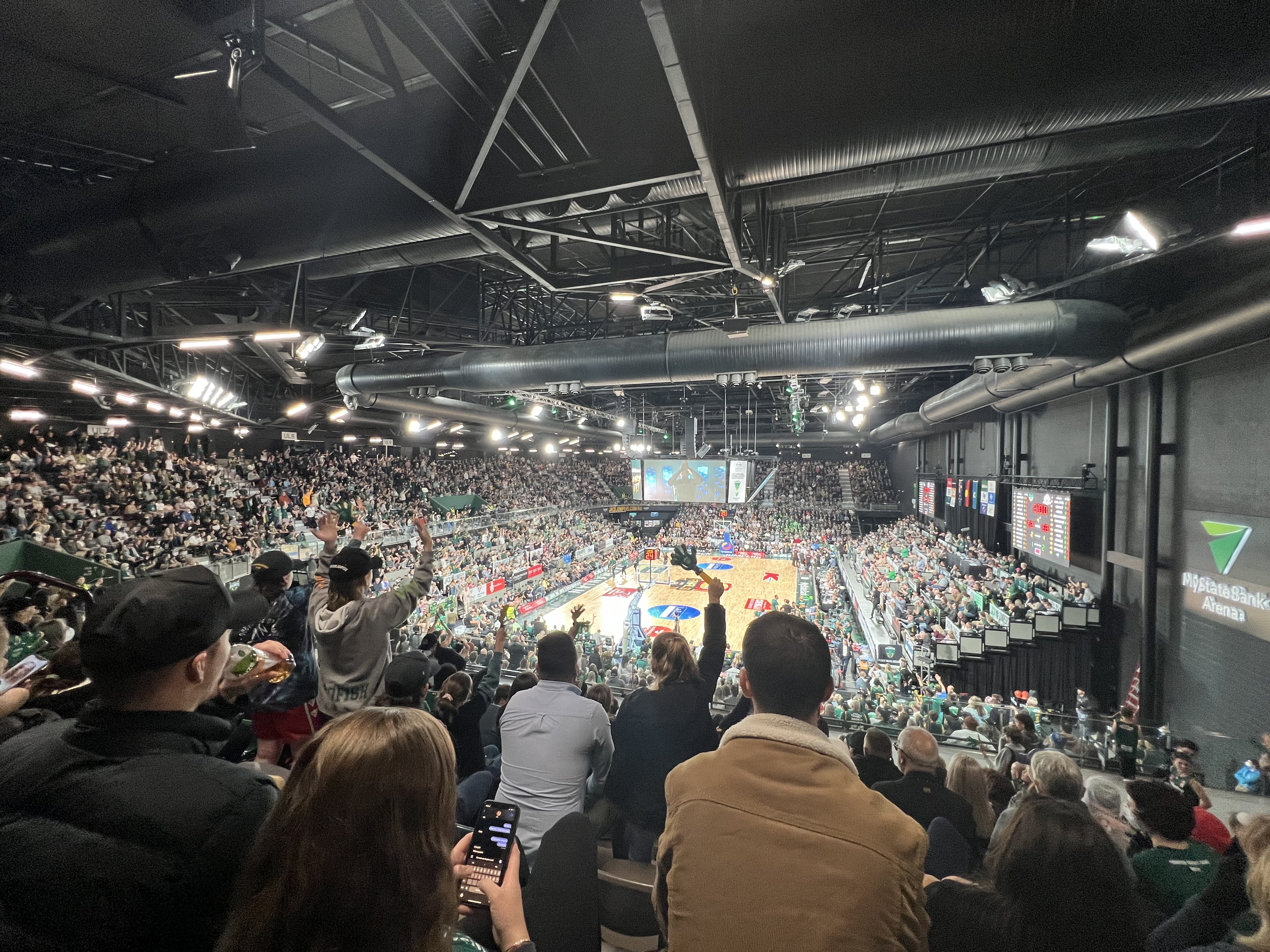
MyState Bank Arena during the 2022 NBL Finals

Although short lived, Launceston Casino City were the first Tasmanian team to participate in the National Basketball League (NBL) and the first to become NBL champions, being victors of the 1981 NBL season and producing NBL champions Andrew Clements, Trevor Mathew and olympian Ian Davies. The Hobart Devils were stalwarts of the league, fostering local talent including two-time NBL champion Anthony Stewart, NBL champion Mark Nash, Peter Mann, Brennan Stanwix, and Justin Hickey, who would go on to found the Auckland Tuatara in the NZNBL. The Devils' infamously became the first team representing a capital city to have their NBL license revoked in 1996. Devonport was also briefly represented in the NBL by the Devonport Warriors between 1983 and 1984. Notably, the Warriors produced Marty Clarke, who played for the North Melbourne Giants during their 1989 NBL Championship win.

After the Devils' disbandment, Tasmania endured a twenty-six year absence from NBL representation. During this period, many Tasmanian players sought opportunities interstate, including three-time NBL champion Matthew Knight, two-time NBL champion and olympian Adam Gibson, NBL champion Sam Harris, NBL champion Lucas Walker, Tanner Krebs and Hugh Greenwood. The Tasmania JackJumpers joined the NBL in the 2021–22 NBL season with homegrown talent including Sejr Deans and development player Tre Armstrong on the inaugural roster. The JackJumpers secured their maiden NBL championship in the 2023–24 season, marking Tasmania's first men's NBL title in 43 years.

==== Women's National Basketball League ====
Historically, the Hobart Hustlers won the inaugural Women's Basketball Conference in 1984, and the Hobart Islanders were champions of the 1991 WNBL season. The team was led by three-time WNBL Most Valuable Player and olympian, Kathy Foster. The Islanders withdrew from the competition in the mid-1990s. Foster was inducted into the Australian Basketball Hall of Fame in 2013. Other notable Tasmanian champions include Carla Boyd, who won a bronze medal at the 1996 Summer Olympics and Hollie Grima, who won a silver medal at the 2008 Summer Olympics. Contemporary players include Alanna Smith, Tayla Roberts, Zoe Crawford and Taylor Mole.

After the Islanders' disbandment, Tasmania endured a twenty-nine year absence from WNBL representation.

The Tasmania Jewels joined the WNBL in the 2026-27 WNBL season.

following the JackJumpers' success, there is growing support for women's basketball in the state.

==== NBL1 ====
Competing in the NBL1 South conference, Tasmania is represented by two teams in the semi-professional NBL1 league, the Hobart Chargers (men's and women's) and Northern Force (men's and women's). Prior to the Chargers joining NBL1, the former Hobart Huskies competed in the inaugural 2019 season. The Chargers men's team won their first NBL1 South championship in 2022. The Force Were Formed From A Merger Between The Launceston Tornadoes and the North-West Tasmania Thunder At The End Of 2025.

In the former South East Australian Basketball League (SEABL), the Hobart Chargers men's team were Conference Champions in 1997, 1998, 2000, 2002, 2008, and 2018, and SEABL League Champions in 2008 and 2018. The women's team were Conference Champions in 2014. The Launceston Tornadoes were women's SEABL League Champions in 1995 and North-West Tasmania were men's Conference Champions in 1996 and 2004. The league was superseded by NBL1 in 2019.

=== Netball ===
The Tasmanian Netball League (TNL) is the pinnacle of netball competition in the state, with teams like the Northern Hawks competing since 1993. The Tasmania Wild team represents the state in the Australian Netball Championships. Netball Tasmania currently partners with the Collingwood Magpies to host some home games in Launceston and aims to establish its own team based in Hobart. CEO Aaron Pidgeon is discussing the licensing process with the Australian Netball League and emphasises the need to provide more opportunities for Australian players, including experienced players like Caitlin Bassett.

Tasmania has demonstrated potential with the Tasmanian Magpies winning the Australian Netball League title in 2018. The success of other Tasmanian sports teams, such as the Hobart Hurricanes and the JackJumpers, indicates a supportive market for elite sports in the region. Netball in Tasmania has grown significantly, with the state actively seeking entry into the national Suncorp Super Netball league. Traditionally, the league has featured a maximum of eight Australian teams, but there are increasing calls for expansion.

A partnership between Netball Australia, Netball Tasmania, and the Tasmanian Government will see the Melbourne Mavericks play Super Netball matches in Hobart in 2024. This partnership aims to enhance pathway programs and provide high-performance opportunities for Tasmanian athletes and coaches.

== Combat sports ==
Active Tasmania ensures the safety of professional and amateur boxing and combat sports contests by applying best practice standards developed in collaboration with industry professionals and Tasmania Police.

=== Boxing ===
Boxing Tasmania is the governing body for amateur boxing in Tasmania and is affiliated with Boxing Australia. Recent Tasmanian champions include Luke Jackson, who won the featherweight bronze medal at the 2006 Commonwealth Games. Jackson was subsequently named team captain for the 2010 Commonwealth Games, and represented Australia at the 2012 Summer Olympics in the lightweight division, again as team captain. Flyweight Jackson Woods also appeared at the 2012 Summer Olympics. Former Ultimate Fighting Championship fighter Rob Wilkinson won the PFL 10 (2022 season) light heavyweight title in 2022.

During the convict period, boxing was illegal but popular in isolated areas where it often accompanied drinking and gambling. The sport's popularity waned in the 1850s as societal respectability grew, but it revived in the 1870s with the adoption of the Queensberry rules, making boxing more respectable.

Throughout the 20th century, boxing continued to thrive in Tasmania. It was particularly popular among miners on the West Coast, with significant matches held at venues like the Gaiety Theatre in Zeehan. During the Great Depression, professional boxing provided financial support to many families, and Tasmanian boxers achieved national titles and international recognition, including William Herbert Smith's gold medal at the 1938 British Empire Games.

A unique aspect of Tasmania's boxing history was the tradition of boxing-tent sideshows. Harry Paulsen, a notable figure, established his boxing tent in 1936 after a brief boxing career and learning the trade with other troupes. His tent became a major attraction, operating for nearly four decades. Paulsen's showmanship included using a large saltwater crocodile as a mascot, famously kept in the family's bathtub between shows.

Between 1948 and 1976, Tasmania produced nine national title winners and three Olympians, showcasing the state's boxing prowess. Notable among them was Ron Gower, who represented Australia in the 1948 and 1952 Summer Olympics, Gerald Freeman who competed in the 1960 Summer Olympics, Al Bourke, Wayne Devlin, who competed in the 1972 Summer Olympics and the 1976 Summer Olympics, David Taylor, who won multiple state and Australian titles, and Jerry Oakford, a junior Tasmanian Champion who won the Australian Lightweight title for three consecutive years between 1978 and 1980.

Even as professional boxing saw a decline in the 1970s, amateur boxing in Tasmania remained robust. In the 1990s, Olympians Justann Crawford and Daniel Geale emerged, continuing the state's legacy of producing top-tier boxers.

Boxing remains strong in rural Tasmania through community engagement like the Southern Stars Boxing Club in Geeveston and O'Callaghan's Gym in Penguin.

=== Judo ===
Judo Tasmania is the governing body for judo in Tasmania and is affiliated with Judo Australia and the International Judo Federation. Notable Tasmanian judokas include Angela Deacon, who won a gold medal at the Oceania Judo Championships in 1992, the first Australian and only female to do so, Dean Lampkin, who collected several Oceania Judo Championships titles and won a silver medal at the 1990 Commonwealth Games, and Chris Bacon, who won a bronze medal at the 1990 Commonwealth Games.

== Cycling ==
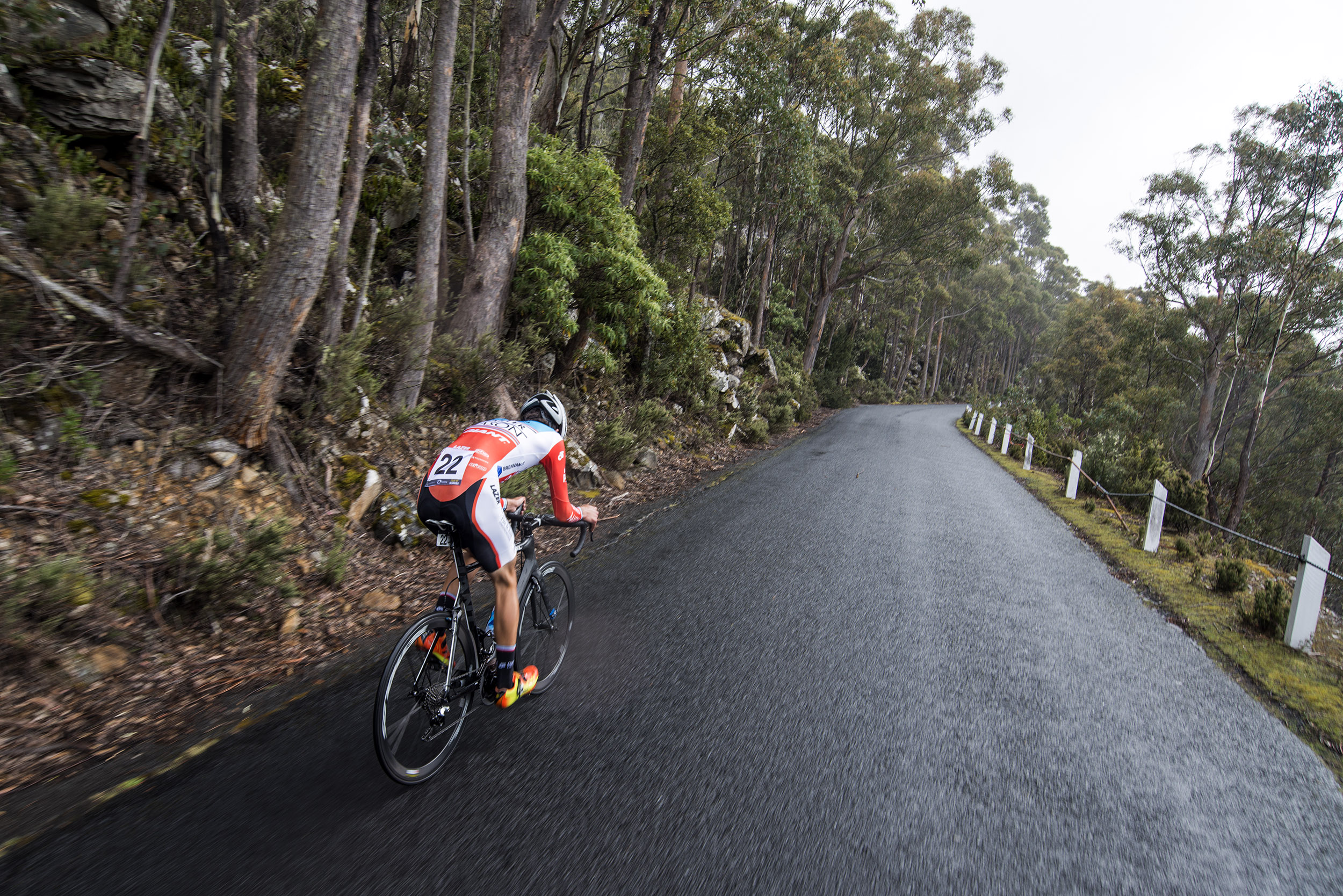
Tour of Tasmania, 2014

Road cycling in Tasmania is popular due to its scenic routes, varied terrain, active cycling community and strong tourism infrastructure. Key routes include the Great Eastern Drive on the east coast, the challenging climbs of the west coast, kunanyi/Mount Wellington, and the Tamar Valley Wine Route near Launceston. Major events include the Tour of Tasmania, Tassie Gift, and various gran fondos. Cycling in Tasmania is administered by AusCycling Tasmania, a subsidiary of the national governing body AusCycling.

Tasmania has produced several well-known cyclists who have achieved significant success in national and international competitions. James Nevin was the first Tasmanian cyclist to represent Australia at the 1952 and 1956 Summer Olympics, while road cyclist Michael Grenda saw Tasmania achieve its first olympic gold medal at the 1984 Summer Olympics in the Men's team pursuit event. Some of the most prominent Tasmanian cyclists include Will Clarke and olympians Michael Grenda, Timothy O'Shannessey, Amy Cure, Matthew Goss, Scott Bowden, Georgia Baker, and Richie Porte.

=== Mountain biking ===
Mountain biking in Tasmania offers diverse terrain and well-developed trail networks. Key destinations include Blue Derby, known for its world-class trails and the Enduro World Series; Maydena Bike Park with gravity-focused trails; Hollybank Mountain Bike Park near Launceston; and St Helens Mountain Bike Trails on the east coast. Other notable trails are Wild Mersey, Kate Reed Reserve, and the North-South Track on kunanyi/Mount Wellington. Tasmania's trails range from rainforest tracks and alpine paths to coastal routes, with infrastructure such as bike rentals and shuttle services. The region also hosts numerous events and competitions, supporting a strong mountain biking community.

== Endurance racing ==
=== Marathon ===
High-profile marathon events in Tasmania include the Cadbury Marathon, Point to Pinnacle, the City to Casino and the Hobart Airport Marathon Festival. Events more recently established include the kunanyi Mountain Run and the Launceston Marathon.

=== Triathlon ===
Established in 1985, the Devonport Triathlon is one of the oldest in Australia. Over the years, the event has evolved into a major triathlon event on the Australian sports calendar. Recently, the race has hosted several high-profile events, including the World Triathlon Para Series, Elite/U23 Oceania Championships, National Championships Junior/Youth, School Sport Triathlon Championships and Community Triathlon.

Hobart was added to the Ironman 70.3 roster in 2023. Tasmania's most successful triathlete is Jacob Birtwhistle, who represented Australia at the 2020 Summer Olympics, won a gold medal in the mixed-relay and a silver medal at the triathlon events at the 2018 Commonwealth Games, and a bronze medal at the mixed-relay event at the 2022 Commonwealth Games. Birtwhistle was the winner of the inaugural IronMan Tasmania event in 2023.

== Football codes ==
=== Australian rules football ===
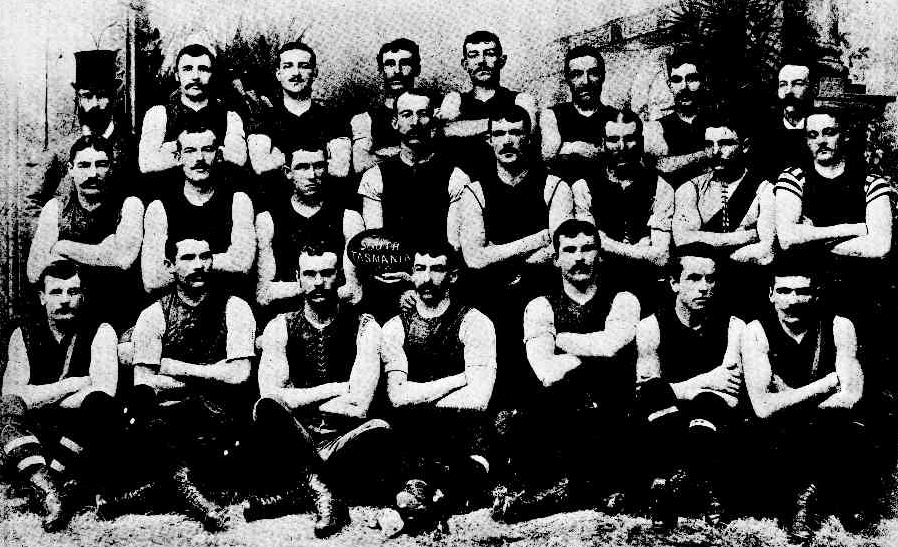
South Tasmania team that toured Sydney in 1890

Australian rules football has been played in Tasmania since the late 1860s. It draws the largest audience for any football code in the state. A 2018 study of internet traffic showed that 79% of Tasmanians are interested in Australian rules football, the highest rate in the country. Tasmania once held the highest participation rate for men aged 5–39 years in Australia, with 22% involvement in 2005. The state has a storied history in interstate matches, having competed vigorously since its inaugural colonial match in 1884, fostering a strong rivalry with Victoria. Tasmania played its last competitive interstate match in the 1990 State of Origin series, culminating in a notable victory over Victoria at North Hobart Oval with an attendance of 18,651 patrons.

Tasmania has produced several notable Australian Football League (AFL) players who have made significant contributions to the sport, including Peter Hudson, Roy Cazaly, Darrel Baldock, Alastair Lynch, Matthew Richardson and Ian Stewart. Prominent contemporary players include Jack Riewoldt, Jeremy Howe, Toby Nankervis and Hugh Greenwood.

The primary football competitions in Tasmania are the statewide Tasmanian Football League (TFL), which has been active intermittently since 1879, and its associated regional leagues: the Southern Football League and the Northern Tasmanian Football League. Following the announcement of the island's first AFL club, the Tasmania Football Club in 2023, the TFL will conclude its final season in 2024, followed by a major restructure of Tasmanian community football from 2025. This restructuring aligns with AFL Tasmania's commitment to strong football pathways and coincides with the Tasmania Football Club's entry into the AFL in 2028.

==== TFL competition ====
The Tasmanian Football League (TFL), established in 1879, is one of Australia's oldest football competitions. It has fostered intense rivalries and produced many skilled players over the years. Notable teams include North Hobart, Glenorchy, Clarence, and Launceston. The league has seen significant crowds, with the 1979 Grand Final attracting over 24,968 spectators. In 2025, new Premier League divisions in the state's South, North, and North West will replace the TSL. Brighton Football Club will join five Southern TSL clubs (Clarence, Glenorchy, Kingborough, Lauderdale, and North Hobart) to form a six-team Southern Premier League for Men and Women. The Northern Premier League's composition is still being determined.

==== Victorian team home games ====
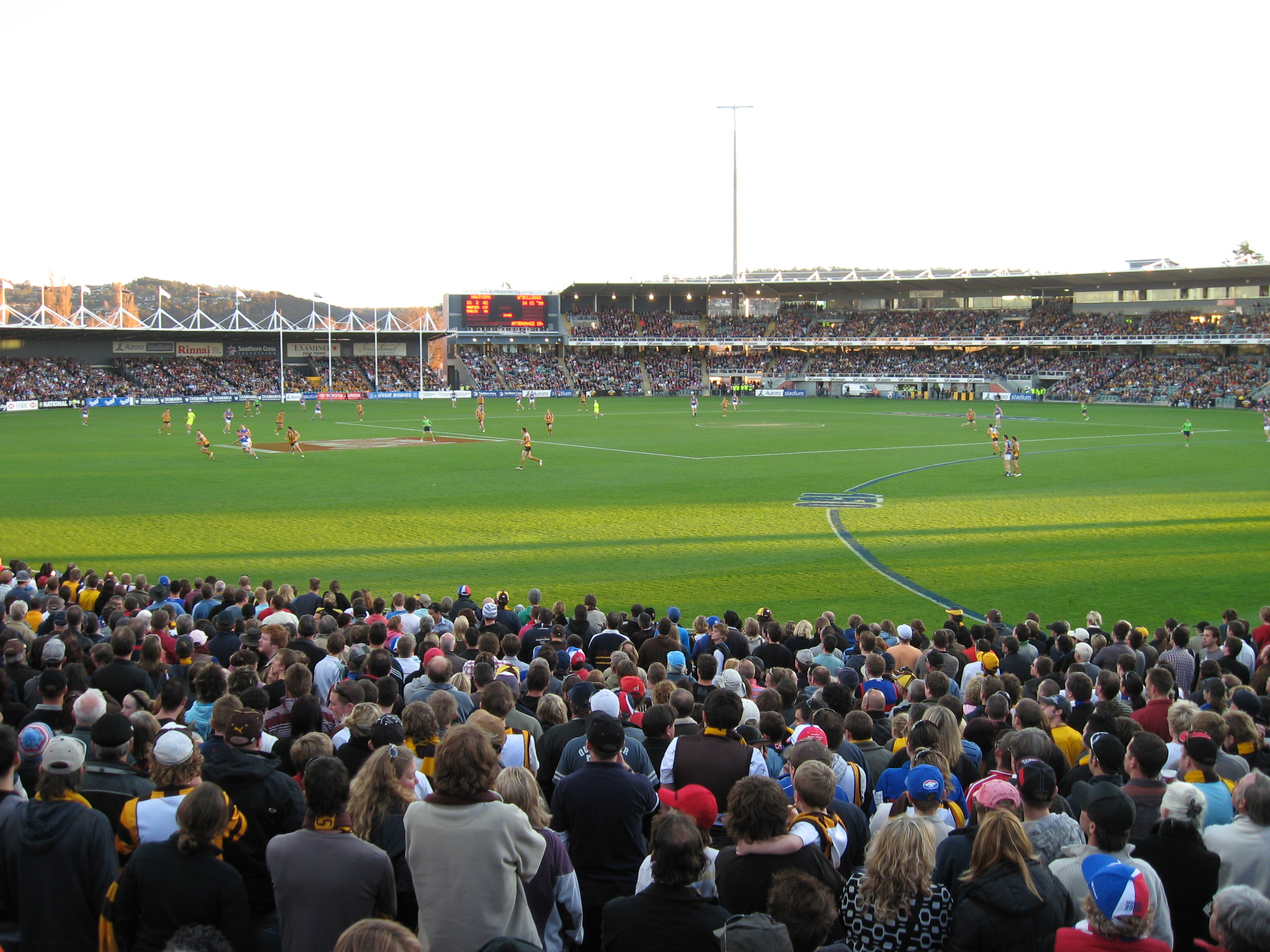
Capacity crowd at a "Tassie Hawks" "home" game at Aurora Stadium during the 2008 AFL Season

Victorian AFL teams have been playing AFL Premiership season matches in Tasmania since 1952, with Fitzroy (1952, 1991–1992), St Kilda (2001–2006), Hawthorn (2001–), North Melbourne (2012–2025), and Richmond (2026-) all having hosted home games in the state at various times.

==== VFL team ====
From 2001 to 2008, a representative club, the Tasmanian Devils, competed in the Victorian Football League (VFL), drawing crowds exceeding 10,000 on two occasions. Following a hiatus of eight years, at the end of the 2008 season AFL Tasmania decided to withdraw the Devils from the VFL in favour of restarting the statewide TFL.

==== AFL team ====
The Tasmania Football Club is set to join the national Australian Football League from the 2028 season, following a formal announcement was made by Gillon McLachlan at the North Hobart Oval on 3 May 2023. Former Richmond Tigers player Brendon Gale was named as the club's inaugural chief executive in May 2024.

=== Gaelic football ===
Based in Hobart, the Tasmanian Gaelic Football and Hurling Association run a seven-a-side Gaelic Football League.

=== Rugby league ===
The Tasmanian Rugby League reestablished a summer competition in 2009.

=== Rugby union ===
The Tasmanian Rugby Union Statewide League consists of 10 Teams and was first established in 1933. The senior men's state representative side for the Tasmanian Rugby Union is the Tasmanian Jack Jumpers. Rugby union in Tasmania consists of the following divisions : Men's, Women's, Junior Under 18, Junior Under 16, Juniors Under 14.

=== Soccer ===
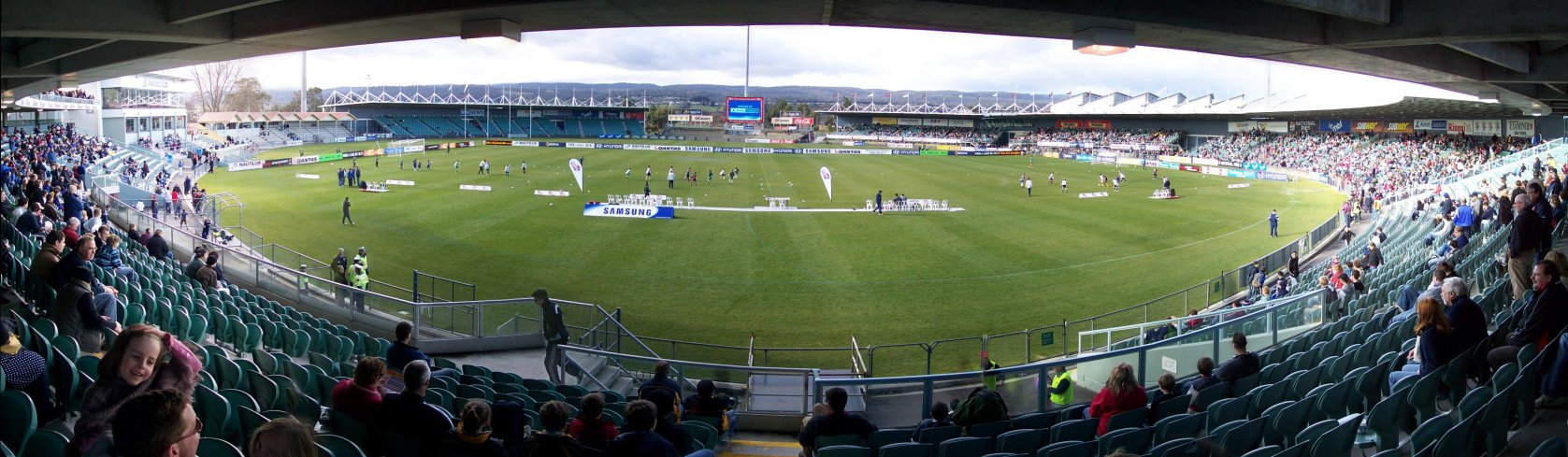
Melbourne Victory vs Adelaide United at Aurora Stadium, Launceston, 2007

The Football Federation Tasmania (FFT) is the governing body for association football (soccer) in Tasmania. It oversees men's, women's, and youth competitions across the state, with the main season running in winter. FFT is also dedicated to grassroots development, organising junior leagues, coaching clinics, and community programs to increase participation and foster a love for the game. It collaborates with Football Australia and other state federations to align with national standards and initiatives, including the National Club Accreditation Scheme.

Since 2013, the highest level of male competition has been the NPL Tasmania, part of the National Premier Leagues system nationwide. This league includes teams from all major Tasmanian regions. Each season's champion advances to the national NPL finals series to compete against other state winners. Below the NPL, the Southern Championship and the Northern Championship serve as key developmental leagues.

Tasmania has several notable soccer grounds that host a range of competitions, from local leagues to higher-level matches. North Hobart Oval, known primarily for Australian rules football, also accommodates soccer games. KGV Park in Glenorchy is a key venue, serving as the home ground for the Glenorchy Knights and hosting National Premier Leagues Tasmania (NPL Tasmania) matches. Valley Road Ground in Devonport, home to the Devonport City Strikers, is renowned for its well-maintained facilities. Darwin Football Park in Kingston hosts Kingborough Lions United FC's matches, while Warrior Park in Warrane is the base for Olympia Warriors FC. Lightwood Park in Blackmans Bay is also used by Kingborough Lions United FC for training and matches.

==== A-League bid ====
FFT is actively pursuing the possibility of establishing an A-League club in Tasmania to provide local players with a pathway to professional careers and to meet the strong community interest in elite football.

=== Touch football ===
Touch football has a small following in Tasmania with approximately 7,500 active participants annually. Touch Football Tasmania (TFT) aims to achieve representation in Australian youth and open squads, with teams set to compete in the National Youth Championships. Challenges include delayed entry of young talent into the sport, typically starting around age 12 or 13, unlike in rugby states. TFT focuses on incremental improvement to bridge the gap with dominant northern states over the next ten years. Bec Oliver's selection in the Australian women's 27-and-over team highlights the potential for Tasmanian talent on the national stage. Local touch football associations, like the Devonport Touch Football Association and Launceston Touch Football Association (LTA), provide platforms for players to develop skills and foster a welcoming environment.

== Golf ==
Tasmania has numerous golf courses spread throughout the island. The town of Bridport in the northeast is home to Barnbougle Dunes, a public golf course designed by architect Tom Doak which opened in 2004 and is ranked among the top 100 courses in the world.

== Hockey and indoor hockey ==
Hockey Tasmania governs and administers the sport of hockey and indoor hockey for most of Tasmania. It also administers the senior Tasmanian representative club The Tassie Tigers which fields a Men's and a Women's team in the elite national domestic competition Hockey One which generally plays its annual home and away season in the months of September, October, and November across Australia. Hockey One and the Tassie Tigers club replaced the now-defunct Australian Hockey League and the former men's and women's teams the Tassie Tigers and the Tassie Van Demons in 2019.

Hockey is predominantly played on synthetic surfaces in Tasmania, although some junior and school competitions do still play on grass fields. There are five hockey centres around the state with synthetic pitches that host a variety of senior and junior competitions: The Tasmanian Hockey Centre, with three synthetic pitches, in Hobart; the Northern Hockey Centre, with two synthetic pitches, in Launceston; one synthetic pitch at Meercroft Park in Devonport; one synthetic pitch at McKenna Park in Burnie; and one synthetic pitch in Smithton. Tasmanian Eddie Ockenden became Australia's first five-time hockey Olympian in 2024, where he was also the Australian flag bearer of the 2024 Summer Olympics.

== Horse racing ==
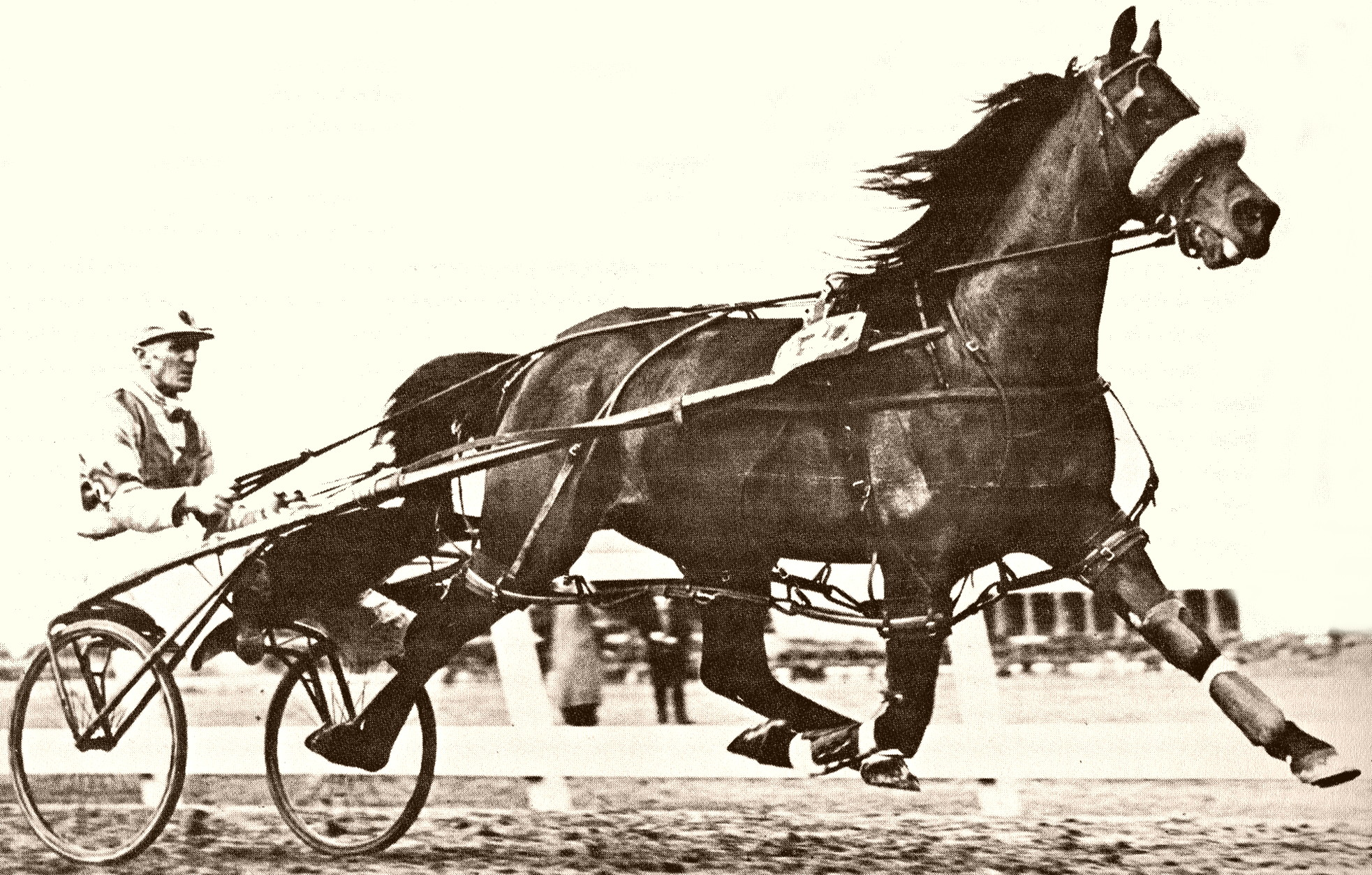
Springfield Globe was foaled in Tasmania and later won the Inter Dominion. He was an outstanding sire that produced 229 winners.

Horse racing in Tasmania began in the early 1810s, with formalisation marked by the establishment of the Van Diemen's Land Turf Club in 1826. The first Hobart Cup was held in 1852, becoming a key event alongside the Launceston Cup, which started in 1880. The Tasmanian Racing Club and the Tasmanian Turf Club were founded in 1874 and 1960, respectively, promoting organised racing in Hobart and Launceston.

The 20th century saw the introduction of the Totalisator and off-course betting agencies, boosting the sport's popularity. The Tasmanian Racing Board was formed in 2004 to oversee thoroughbred racing, harness, and greyhound racing. Major events like the Hobart Cup, Launceston Cup, and Tasmanian Derby remain central to the Tasmanian Summer Racing Carnival, with key racecourses at the Elwick Race Course, Mowbray, and Spreyton continuing to host significant races.

== Motorsport ==
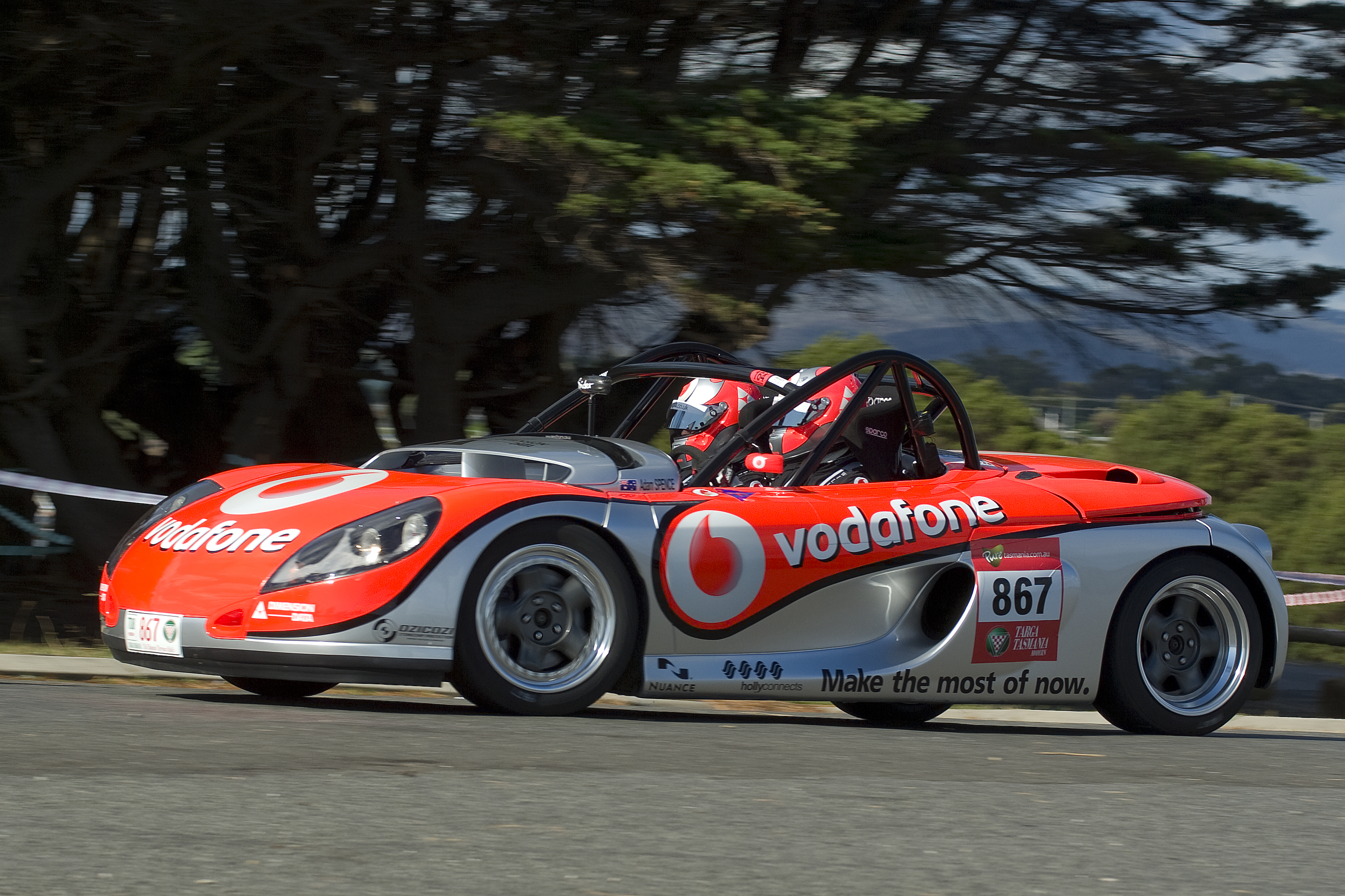
A Renault Sport Spider during Targa Tasmania

Motorsport in Tasmania encompasses various forms of racing, with significant events and venues attracting participants and spectators. The key tracks are Symmons Plains Raceway near Launceston, hosting rounds of the Supercars Championship, and Baskerville Raceway near Hobart, known for its challenging layout and historic significance.

Major events include the Tasmania SuperSprint, part of the Supercars Championship, and Targa Tasmania, a six-day tarmac-based rally covering over 2,000 kilometres (1,200 mi) of closed public roads. A smaller version, the Targa Wrest Point, is also held annually. The Tasmanian Rally Series is held over four rallies annually. Local motorsport clubs, such as the Tasmanian Motorsport Club and Hobart Sporting Car Club, organize events including circuit racing, hill climbs, and club meets.

Motorcycle racing, off-road rallying, and grassroots motorsport also have a strong presence in Tasmania. Events like the Australian Superbike Championship and local dirt rallies highlight the island's varied terrain. Motorsport significantly contributes to the local economy through tourism, and development programs support emerging talent in the sport.

The Australian Grand Prix was twice held in Tasmania, at the Longford Circuit, in 1959 and 1965.

Notable Tasmanian motorsport champions include John Bowe and Marcos Ambrose, who won the V8 Supercar championship in 2003 and 2004 before relocating to the United States to race in NASCAR.

== Net and wall games ==
=== Real tennis ===
Real tennis in Tasmania has a rich history dating back to the establishment of the Hobart Real Tennis Club in 1875. This unique and historical sport, also known as royal tennis, has maintained a niche following on the island, distinct from its more widely known descendant, lawn tennis. Tasmania has produced notable Real Tennis World Championship players including Robert Fahey and Judith Clarke, who have made significant contributions to the sport's legacy both locally and internationally. Despite its exclusivity and specialised nature, real tennis continues to thrive in Tasmania, supported by dedicated players and enthusiasts who appreciate its traditions and competitive intricacies.

=== Table tennis ===
In Tasmania, table tennis is played consistently throughout the year, with active participation across the island. Table Tennis Tasmania functions as the governing body for the Olympic and Paralympic sport in the state, overseeing the management and promotion of table tennis at all levels, including grassroots involvement, elite athlete development, and competitive events. Tasmania's first Paralympian, Donald Dann, competed in the 1980 Arnhem Paralympics in the sports of athletics and table tennis.

=== Tennis ===
Tennis enjoys a prominent presence in Tasmania, with numerous clubs and facilities spread across the island. The sport is governed by Tennis Tasmania. The Hobart International is a major tournament as part of the lead-up to the Australian Open. The tournament is a professional tournament involving women's singles and doubles competitions played at the Hobart International Tennis Centre on the Queens Domain in Hobart. Olympian Richard Fromberg is Tasmania's most notable tennis champion.

== Water sports ==
=== Diving ===
Based at the Hobart Aquatic Centre, Diving Tasmania is Tasmania's official sporting organisation for Olympic springboard and platform diving sports. Janet Weidenhofer was the first Tasmanian diver to represent Australia in the 1938 British Empire Games, while Julie Kent is the most successful, representing Australia at the 1984 and 1988 Summer Olympics. Kent also competed in the 1982 Commonwealth Games and 1986 Commonwealth Games, winning a bronze medal in the 10m platform. At age 17, Elizabeth Jack was selected as Australia's youngest-ever entrant for the 1976 Summer Olympics. Emily Meaney represented Australia at the 2022 Birmingham Commonwealth Games.

=== Rowing ===
Rowing Tasmania is the governing body for olympic rowing in Tasmania. Rowing has been a popular sport in Tasmania since the early 19th century, with the first race on the River Derwent in 1815. Initially organised around gambling, rowing grew to include various regattas by 1831 and saw the first intercolonial race in 1861. Tasmania's competitive rowing culture stemmed from its private schools seeking to emulate prestigious English institutions, however due to the island's relationship with the water, the sport became widespread and in 1874, the former Hobart High School became the Colony of Tasmania's first public school to establish a boating club. Adult men's clubs such as the Shipwright's Point Rowing Club (1867), the Derwent Boating Club (1869), and the Tamar Boating Club (1870) were established, and annual North vs. South races began in 1891. Notable achievements include Cecil McVilly's successes, the first King's Cup win in 1906, and the women's championship win in 1921. Despite a decline in the 1950s, Tasmania produced national champions including Ted Hale. In 1969, Lake Barrington became a world-class rowing venue, hosting the 1990 World Rowing Championships.

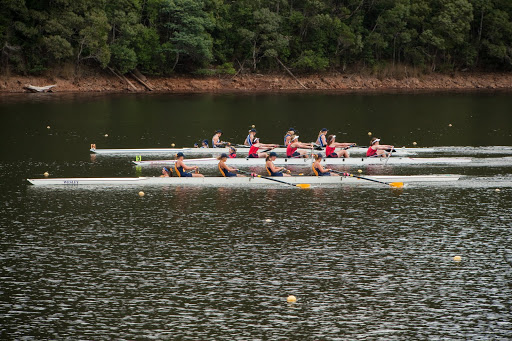
Lake Barrington Regatta in 2013

The Tasmanian Institute of Sport continues to support competitive rowing, with recent champions such as Stephen Hawkins and Dana Faletic making significant international impacts. Lightweight rowing World Champion and olympian Stephen Hawkins first represented Australia at just 17 and won a gold medal at the 1992 Summer Olympics in the double sculls with his partner Peter Antonie at 22. Rowing has since produced more Tasmanian olympians than any other sport, including Anthony Edwards (1996, 2000, 2004, 2008, 2012), Duncan Free (1996, 2000, 2004, 2008), Simon Burgess (1996, 2000, 2004), Darren Balmforth (2000), Brendan Long (2004), Cameron Wurf (2004), Dana Faletic (2004, 2012), Kerry Hore (2004, 2008, 2012, 2016), Scott Brennan (2004, 2008, 2012), Kate Hornsey (2008, 2012), Samuel Beltz (2008, 2012), Tom Gibson (2008, 2012), Meaghan Volker (2016) and Sarah Hawe (2020).

=== Swimming ===
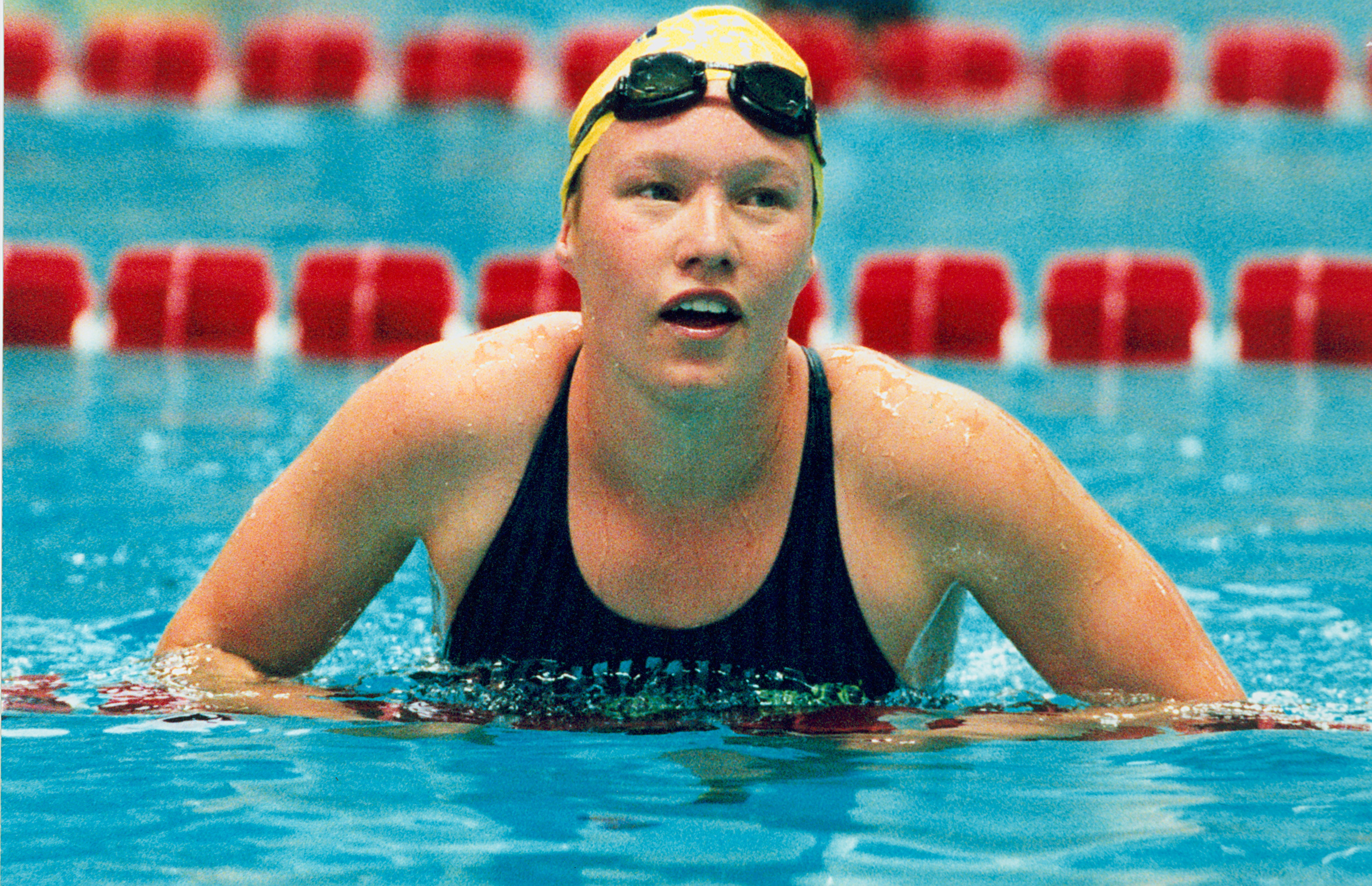
Tasmanian paralympian Melissa Carlton at the 1996 Atlanta Paralympic Games

Swimming Tasmania is the governing body for swimming in Tasmania. The Hobart Aquatic Centre has hosted significant championships including the Australian Swimming Championships. Other aquatic facilities include the Clarence Aquatic Centre and Launceston Aquatic.

Ariarne Titmus, a four-time Olympic gold medalist, is Tasmania's most accomplished competitive swimmer. She holds the title of Olympic champion in the women's 400-metre freestyle, winning gold at both the 2020 and 2024 Summer Olympics. Additionally, she is the world record holder in the long course 200-metre freestyle and 400-metre freestyle events. Tasmania's most successful Paralympian swimmer, Melissa Carlton, earned multiple medals—including gold, silver, and bronze—while representing Australia at the 1996 Atlanta and 2000 Sydney Paralympics.

Other notable Tasmanian swimmers include Maximillian Giuliani, who secured a bronze medal in the 4 × 200 m freestyle relay at the 2024 Summer Olympics. Toby Haenen represented Australia at the 1992 Summer Olympics, while Scott Goodman and Haenen both won bronze medals at the 1996 Summer Olympics. Adam Lucas, born in Tasmania, represented Australia at the 2004 Summer Olympics.

John Hayres represented Australia in the 1956 Summer Olympics before relocating to Tasmania in 1969. Other historical achievements in Tasmanian swimming also include Virginia Cooper, who won the state's first national swimming gold medal in 1965. Sandra Yost captured multiple medals at the 1974 Commonwealth Games, including gold in the 200m butterfly, silver in the 200m backstroke, and bronze in the 100m butterfly. Audrey Moore claimed a bronze medal at the 1982 Commonwealth Games and later represented Australia at the 1984 Summer Olympics, alongside Brett Stocks.

=== Water skiing ===
There are a number of active water ski clubs in Tasmania. These include Meadowbank Water Ski Club, Northern Aquatic Club, Roseberry Ski Club, Kentish Aquatic Club and the Horsehead Water Ski Club.

=== Water polo ===
Water Polo Tasmania is the governing body of water polo in Tasmania. The Hobart Aquatic Centre is the main venue for these events and is host to local and national water polo matches. The main local event is the Club Water Polo Championships held in southern Tasmania between the four clubs: Clarence, Sandy Bay, UTAS Honey Badgers and Wet Magic. A schools competition is run for Grades 5-12 during Term 2/3 which many southern schools participate in. Tasmania fields many state teams which compete at national competitions and has had a number of athletes selected to national teams over the years.

== Winter sports ==
=== Snow skiing ===
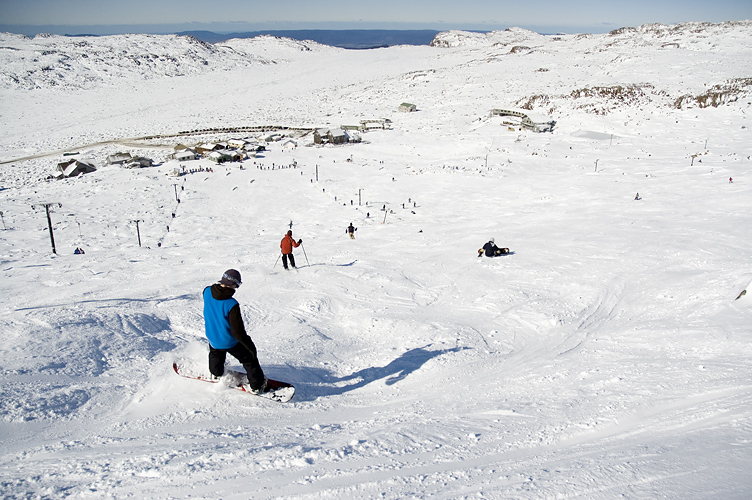
The Summit Run, Ben Lomond, Tasmania

The most southerly ski fields in Australia are located in Tasmania. Much of the State is subject to at least occasional winter snows. Mount Ossa is the highest point on the island at 1614 m, but Tasmania has eight mountains exceeding 1500 m and 28 above 1,220 m. Also notable is the Central Plateau, at an elevation of around 900 m. The capital city of Hobart is built at the base of Mount Wellington, which at 1270 m is snow-capped in winter.

Tasmania's premier Alpine skiing operations are located at Ben Lomond 60 km from Launceston. The village is at 1460m and the top elevation is 1570m. Limited downhill ski operations also exist in the Mount Field National Park at Mount Mawson, which is approximately 89 kilometres north west of Hobart and rises from 1200 m to 1320 m altitude.

One of Australia's most scenic alpine locations is located in Tasmania at Cradle Mountain, where cross country skiing is possible. Cradle Mountain is part of the Tasmanian Wilderness World Heritage Area, inscribed by UNESCO in 1982.

=== Ice hockey ===
The Ice Hockey Tasmania conducts, encourages, promotes, advances, controls and administers all forms of Ice Hockey in Tasmania. The main ice hockey venue is the Glenorchy Ice Skating Rink.

== Track and field ==
Athletics Tasmania serves as the leading authority for track and field sports within the state. Historically, Hobart annually hosted the prestigious Briggs Track Classic at the Domain Athletic Centre, a highlight of the Australian Athletics Tour. Additionally, various regions host signature events like the renowned Burnie Gift. Notably, in 2015, the North-West town of Penguin hosted the esteemed Australian All Schools 12 and under Track and Field Championships. Moreover, Athletics South oversees regional track and field competitions held during the summer season (October - March) and organises winter cross country events (April - September) in southern Tasmania.

=== Javelin ===
Tasmania's most notable javelin thrower is William Hamlyn-Harris, who represented Australia at the 2004 Summer Olympics and won a silver medal at the 2006 Commonwealth Games.

== Yachting ==
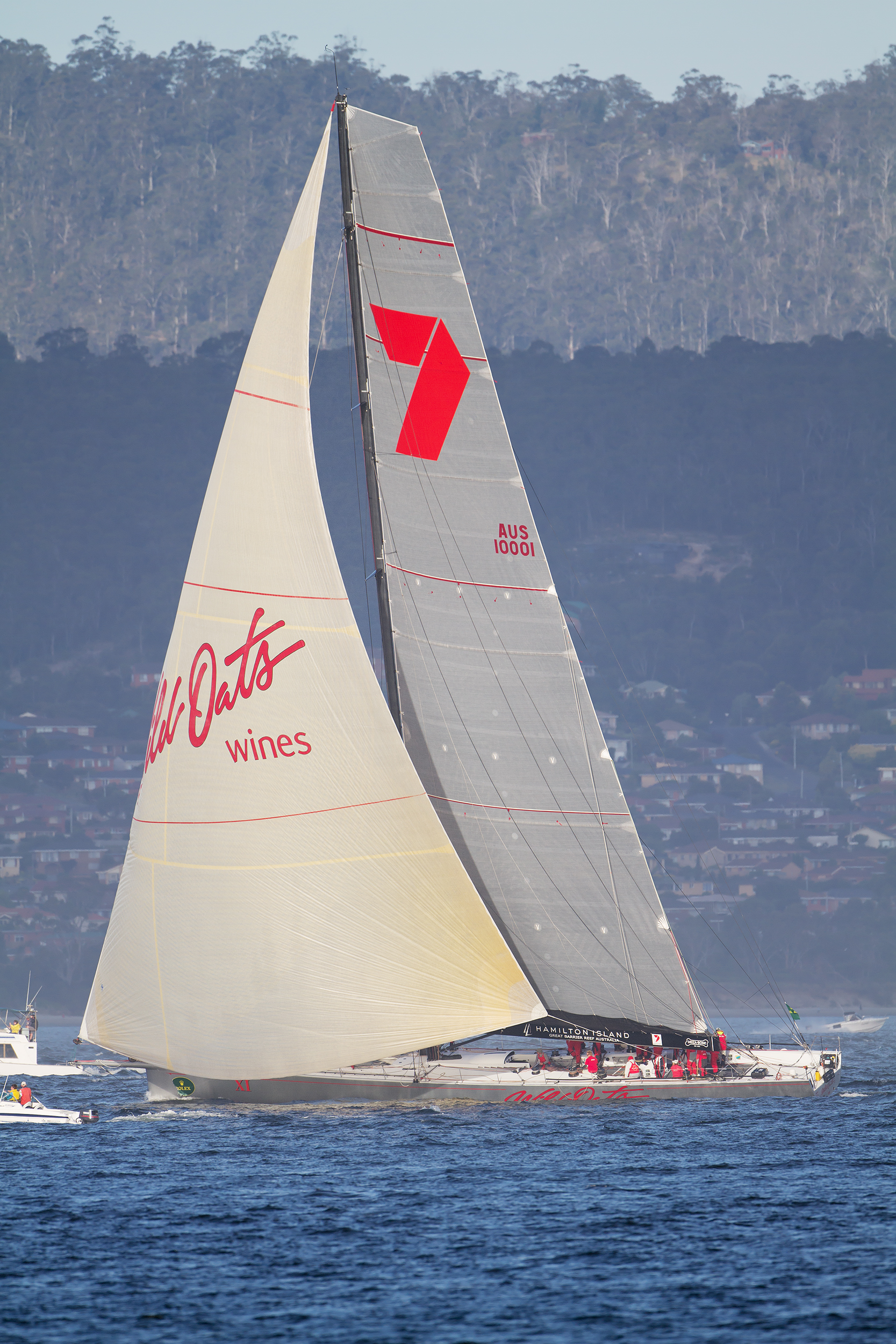
Wild Oats XI finishing the 2011 Sydney to Hobart

Yacht racing in Tasmania is ingrained in the state's maritime culture, offering competitors a chance to test their skills against the elements while showcasing the island's coastal scenery. With its waterways, Tasmania provides an ideal setting for both competitive and recreational sailing.

The Sydney to Hobart Yacht Race is a "traditional post-Christmas fare for southern hemisphere sailing enthusiasts." It covers 630 nautical miles (1,170 km; 720 mi). Because of safety issues, it is regarded by BBC Sports as the hardest sailing race to qualify for.

Tasmania's unique geographical features, including the challenging waters of the River Derwent and the unpredictable weather of Bass Strait, present a formidable environment for yacht racing. Competitors must navigate tidal currents, shifting winds, and often rough seas, adding an extra dimension of strategy to the sport. Other popular annual races include the Australian Three Peaks Race, the Launceston to Hobart Yacht Race and Melbourne to Hobart Yacht Race.

In addition to offshore racing, Tasmania offers a variety of inshore racing opportunities, with regattas and club races held regularly along the coast. Hobart's Derwent Sailing Squadron and the eastern shore's Bellerive Yacht Club, are among the clubs that host local racing events catering to sailors of all skill levels.

== Sporting Events ==
Tasmania has hosted and co-hosted a number of international and national sporting events over the years.

=== In Hobart ===
- The 1924, 1947, And 1966 Australian National Football Carnivals.
- The 2003 VFL Finals Series
- The 2004 VFL Finals Series
- The 2005 VFL Finals Series
- The Inaugural 1987 Australian Masters Games.
- The 2001 Men's Hockey Junior World Cup.
- The 2011 Men's Oceania Cup.
- The 2011 Women's Oceania Cup.
- The 2024 Men's Hockey One Finals Series.
- The 2024 Women's Hockey One Finals Series.
- The 1908, 1924, 1936, 1951, 1959, 1960, 1965, 1967, And 1973 Australian Athletics Championships.
- The 1908, and 1924 Australasian Athletics Championships.
- The FIBA Oceania Championship 1975.
- The 1991 WNBL Grand Final.
- The 2022 NBL Grand Final.
- The 2024 NBL Grand Final.
- The Hobart International (Annually).
- The 1940, 1960, 1961, 1979, And 1980 Australian Hard Court Championships.
- The 1948 Australian PGA Championship.
- The 1994, 1995, And 2000 Real Tennis World Championship.
- The 1992 Cricket World Cup.
- The 2015 Cricket World Cup.
- The 2022 Men's T20 World Cup.
- The 1978/79 One Day Cup Final.
- The 1986/87 One Day Cup Final.
- The 2007/08 One Day Cup Final.
- The 2025/26 One-Day Cup Final.
- The 2006/07 Sheffield Shield Final.
- The 2010/11 Sheffield Shield Final.
- The 2012/13 Sheffield Shield Final.
- The 2021/22 WNCL Final.
- The 2022/23 WNCL Final.
- The 2023/24 WNCL Final.
- The BBL 14 Final.
- The WBBL 11 Final.
- The 1930, 1935, 1939, 1959, 1965, 1971, 1977, 1983, And 2001 Australian Swimming Championships.
- The 1999/2000 FINA Swimming World Cup.
- The 2000 Underwater Hockey World Championships.
- The 2017 Junior Underwater Hockey World Championships.
- The 1985, 1992, And 1999 Australian Canoe Polo Championships.
- The Sydney to Hobart Yacht Race (Annually).
- The Melbourne to Hobart Yacht Race (Annually).
- The Launceston to Hobart Yacht Race (Annually).
- The Hobart Cup (Annually).
- The 2010, And 2025 Australasian Police and Emergency Services Games.
- The 2013 National Premier Leagues Grand Final

=== In Launceston ===
- The 1975 FIBA Oceania Championship.
- The 1980 NBL Grand Final.
- The 2005 VFL Finals Series
- The 2021 AFL Finals Series.
- The 2006 A-League Pre-season Challenge Cup.
- The 2007 A-League Pre-season Challenge Cup.
- The 2008 A-League Pre-season Challenge Cup.
- The 2003 Rugby World Cup.
- The Launceston to Hobart Yacht Race (Annually).
- The Launceston Cup (Annually).
- The 2026 Australian Transplant Games.

=== In Carrick ===
- The 1991 Australian Sprintcar Championship.

=== In Latrobe ===
- The 1976, 2007, 2014, And 2020 Australian Sprintcar Championship.

=== In Devonport ===
- The 1987 ABA Grand Final.
- The 1996 ABA Grand Final.
- The 1996 ABA Women's Grand Final.
- The 2017 Australian Masters Games.
- The Devonport Cup (Annually).

=== In Wilmot ===
- The 1990 World Rowing Championships.

=== In Ulverstone ===
- The 2017 Australian Masters Games.

=== In Penguin ===
- The 2017 Australian Masters Games.

=== In Burnie ===
- The Burnie Gift (Annually).
- The Burnie Ten (Annually).
- The Burnie International (Annually).
- The 2017 Australian Masters Games.
- The Burnie Cup (Annually).
- The 2020, And 2021 National Archery Championships.
- The 2020, And 2021 National Youth Archery Championships.

== Sports Teams ==
=== Hobart-based ===
Club/Team	Sport	League	Venue	Established	Premierships
Hobart Hurricanes Men's	Cricket	Big Bash League	Bellerive Oval	2011	1
Hobart Hurricanes Women's	Cricket	Women's Big Bash League	Bellerive Oval	2015	1
Hobart Chargers	Basketball	NBL1 South	The Hutchins School	1981	11
Tasmania Football Club	Australian rules football	Australian Football League/AFL Women's/Victorian Football League/VFL Women's	Bellerive Oval/North Hobart Oval/Macquarie Point Stadium/Kingston Twin Ovals	2023	Nill
Tasmania Devils Academy	Australian rules football	Talent League Boys/Talent League Girls	North Hobart Oval	2018	Nill
Tasmania JackJumpers	Basketball	National Basketball League	Derwent Entertainment Centre	2020	1
Tasmania Jewels	Basketball	Women's National Basketball League	Derwent Entertainment Centre	2025	Nill
Tasmania Wild	Netball	Super Netball Reserves	Hobart Netball and Sports Centre/Kingborough Sports Centre	2022	Nill
Tasmanian Tigers Men's	Cricket	Sheffield Shield/One-Day Cup	Bellerive Oval	1851	7
Tasmanian Tigers Women's	Cricket	Women's National Cricket League	Bellerive Oval	1906	3
Tasmania Rugby League Team	Rugby league	Affiliated States Championship	North Hobart Oval	1953	Nill
Tasmania Rugby Union Team	Rugby union	Australian Rugby Shield	Rugby Park	1949	Nill
Tassie Tigers	Field hockey	Hockey One	Tasmanian Hockey Centre	1991	1

== Sources ==
- AusPlay (2023a). "National Sport and Physical Activity Participation Report" (PDF). Clearinghouse for Sport. Australian Sports Commission. Archived from the original (PDF) on 2024-05-11.
- AusPlay (2023-10-31). "AusPlay survey results July 2022 - June 2023" (Microsoft Excel). Clearinghouse for Sport. Australian Sports Commission.
- AusPlay (2015). "Focus on State and Territory Participation" (Microsoft Power BI). Clearinghouse for Sport. Australian Sports Commission.
- Scott, David (2006). "Olympians". University of Tasmania. Centre for Tasmanian Historical Studies. Archived from the original on 2019-05-25.
- Young, David Frederick (2005), Sporting Island: A History of Sport and Recreation in Tasmania, Sport and Recreation Tasmania, ISBN 0975233106 – via National Library of Australia
