= Glenorchy Ice Skating Rink =

Former ice sports centre in Glenorchy, Tasmania

- Interactive map of Glenorchy Ice Skating Rink
- Location: 327 Main Road, Glenorchy, Tasmania, Australia 7010
- Coordinates: 42°50′1.1″S 147°16′50.1″E
- Capacity: 100
- Surface: 30 m × 15 m (98 ft × 49 ft)

Construction
- Opened: 1980; 46 years ago
- Closed: 21 May 2022; 4 years ago

Tenants
- Ice Hockey Tasmania (1980–2022); FSAT (Figure Skating Association of Tasmania) (1980–2022)

The Glenorchy Ice Skating Rink was an ice sports and public skating centre in Glenorchy, Tasmania, Australia. Opened in 1980 by Lithuanian immigrants Tony and Beverly Kaitinis, it was the only ice rink in Tasmania and served as the home venue for Ice Hockey Tasmania and the Figure Skating Association of Tasmania (FSAT).

On 21 May 2022, the facility closed permanently, leaving the state without an operational ice skating facility.

== Facilities ==
Prior to its closure, the venue's facilities included:

- 30 m × 15 m (98 ft × 49 ft) ice rink
- Spectator seating capacity of 100
- Skate hire
- Lockers
- Skating aids
- Party rooms
- Café
- Restrooms

== Events and community history ==
The rink hosted general public skating sessions, Friday night discos, figure skating sessions, and 3-on-3 ice hockey, including the Van Diemen's League and the Ice Breakers development program.

It also hosted an annual ice hockey charity exhibition event organized by Ice Skating Tasmania and Ice Hockey Tasmania. Held in memory of local ice hockey player Aaron Burns, who died from leukaemia, the event raised funds to support junior ice hockey development and promote the sport in Tasmania.

=== Save the Rink campaign ===
In 2021, following news of the site's potential redevelopment, local community members launched a public campaign to keep the venue open. The movement gained international attention when American Olympic figure skater Nancy Kerrigan lent her support to the effort. Despite community advocacy, the venue ultimately ceased operations the following year.

== See also ==
- List of ice rinks in Australia
- Sport in Tasmania
