= Vamos Stakes =

- Class: Group 3
- Location: Launceston Racecourse; Mowbray, Australia
- Inaugurated: 2007 (Listed)
- Race type: Thoroughbred - Flat racing
- Sponsor: Country Club Tasmania (2025 & 2026)

Race information
- Distance: 1,400 metres
- Surface: Turf
- Track: Left-handed
- Qualification: Fillies and mares three year old and older
- Weight: Weight for age
- Purse: A$150,000 (2026)

The Vamos Stakes is a Tasmanian Turf Club Group 3 Thoroughbred horse race held under Weight for age conditions, for fillies and mares aged three years old and upwards, over a distance of 1,400 metres at Launceston Racecourse, Mowbray, Australia in February.

== History ==
The race is named after the mare, Vamos, who won the Launceston Cup in 1954 and 1955 and was inducted into the Tasmanian Racing Hall of Fame.

Lady Lynette from the stable of David & Scott Brunton won the race three times (2009, 2011 and 2012), ridden each time by Michael Guthrie. The Brunton stable has also trained the winner in 2007 (Lekitama), 2010 (I'm A Hussy) and 2018 (Life On The Wire).

Brendon McCoull has ridden the winner in 2007 (Lekitama), 2021 (Still A Star) and 2022 (Take The Sit).

=== Grade ===
- 2007–2013 - Listed Race
- 2014 onwards - Group 3

== Winners ==
The following are past winners of the race.

- 2026 - Sanniya
- 2025 - Geegees Mistruth
- 2024 - Megamea
- 2023 - Jaja Chaboogie
- 2022 - Take The Sit
- 2021 - Still A Star
- 2020 - Deroche
- 2019 - Twitchy Frank
- 2018 - Life On The Wire
- 2017 - Kiss Me Ketut
- 2016 - I Love It
- 2015 - Vibrant Rouge
- 2014 - Rebel Bride
- 2013 - Beautiful Buns
- 2012 - Lady Lynette
- 2011 - Lady Lynette
- 2010 - I'm A Hussy
- 2009 - Lady Lynette
- 2008 - Blazonry
- 2007 - Lekitama

== See also ==
- Launceston Cup
- List of Australian Group races
- Group races
