= Launceston Cup =

- Class: Group III
- Location: Launceston Racecourse; Mowbray, Australia
- Inaugurated: 1865
- Race type: Thoroughbred - Flat racing
- Sponsor: Ladbrokes (2026)

Race information
- Distance: 2400 metres
- Surface: Turf
- Track: Left-handed
- Qualification: Open
- Weight: Handicap
- Purse: A$250,000 (2026)

The Launceston Cup is a Tasmanian Turf Club Group 3 open handicap Thoroughbred horse race run over a distance of 2400 metres at Launceston Racecourse in Mowbray, Tasmania, Australia in February.

== History ==
The race is part of the Tasmanian Summer Racing Carnival, and is also one of Tasmania's main annual social events. The Cup was first run in 1865.

A notable achievement, unlikely to be repeated, was performed by the horse Strop who won the race four times over a 10-year period (1866, 1869, 1874 and 1876).

St Andrews, trained by George Blackler won the race in 2000, 2002 and 2003.

The Vamos Stakes which is held on the same race-day is named in honour of the horse Vamos which won the Launceston Cup in 1954 and 1955.

=== Distance ===
- 1865–1873 - 3 miles (~4800 metres)
- 1874–1879 - 2 miles (~3200 metres)
- 1880–1891 - 1 3/4 miles (~2800 metres)
- 1892–1968 - 1 1/2 miles (~2400 metres)
- 1969–1973 - 1 5/8 miles (~2600 metres)
- 1974–2001 - 2600 metres
- 2002 onwards - 2400 metres

=== Grade ===
- 1875–1979 - Principal race
- 1980 onwards - Group 3 race

=== 1951 racebook ===
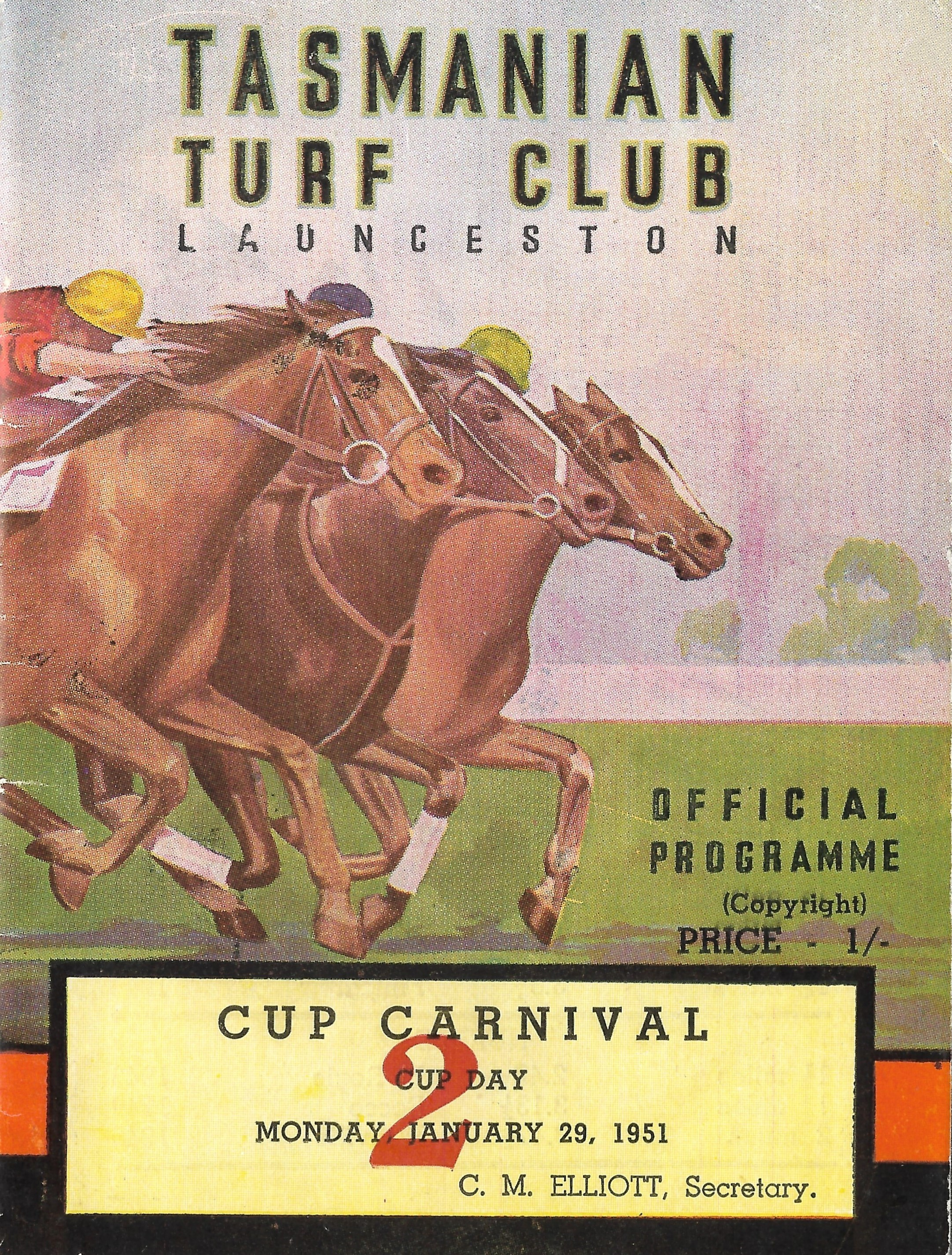
1951 TTC Launceston Cup racebook front cover

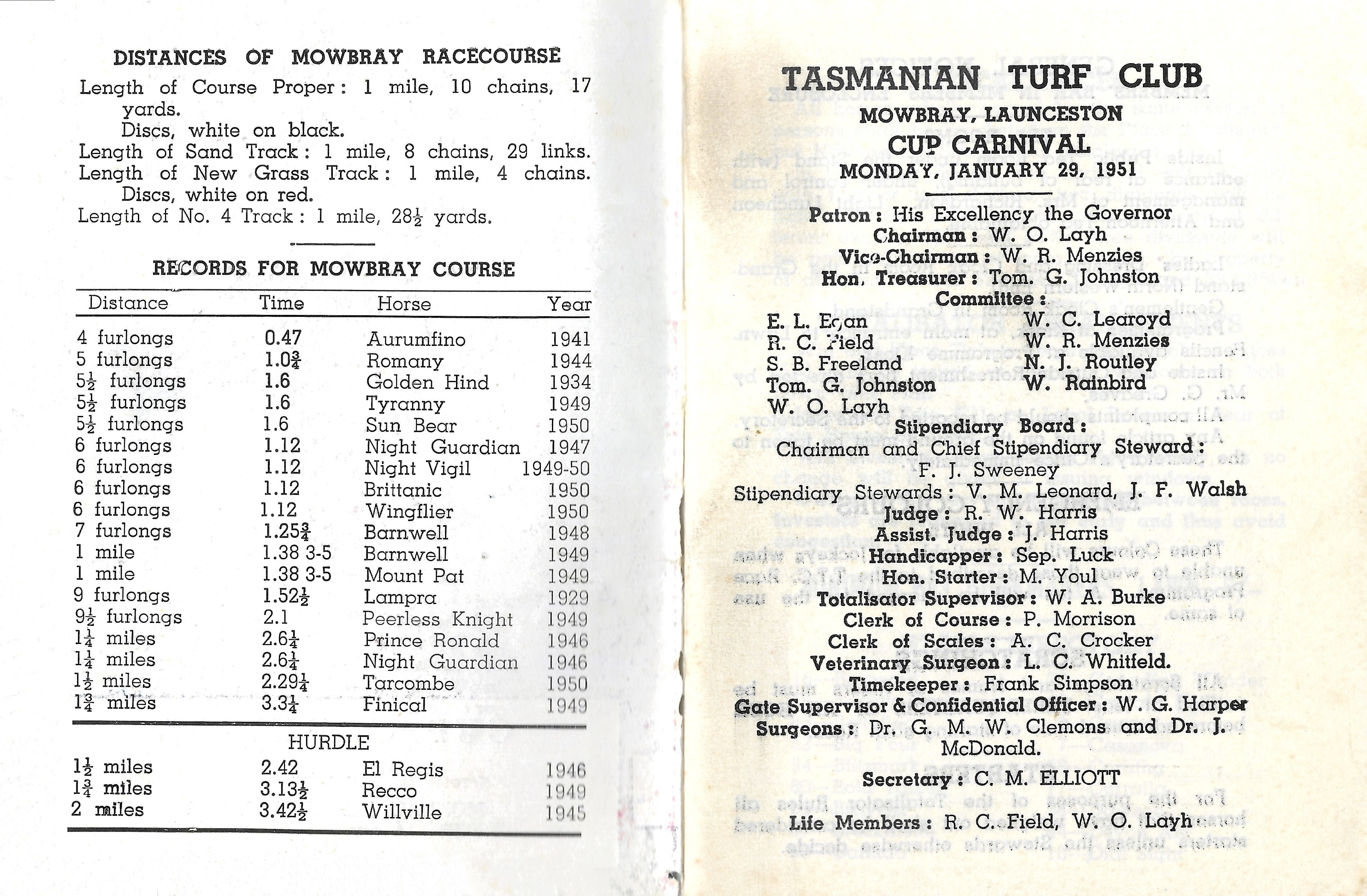
1951 TTC Launceston Cup showing raceday officials

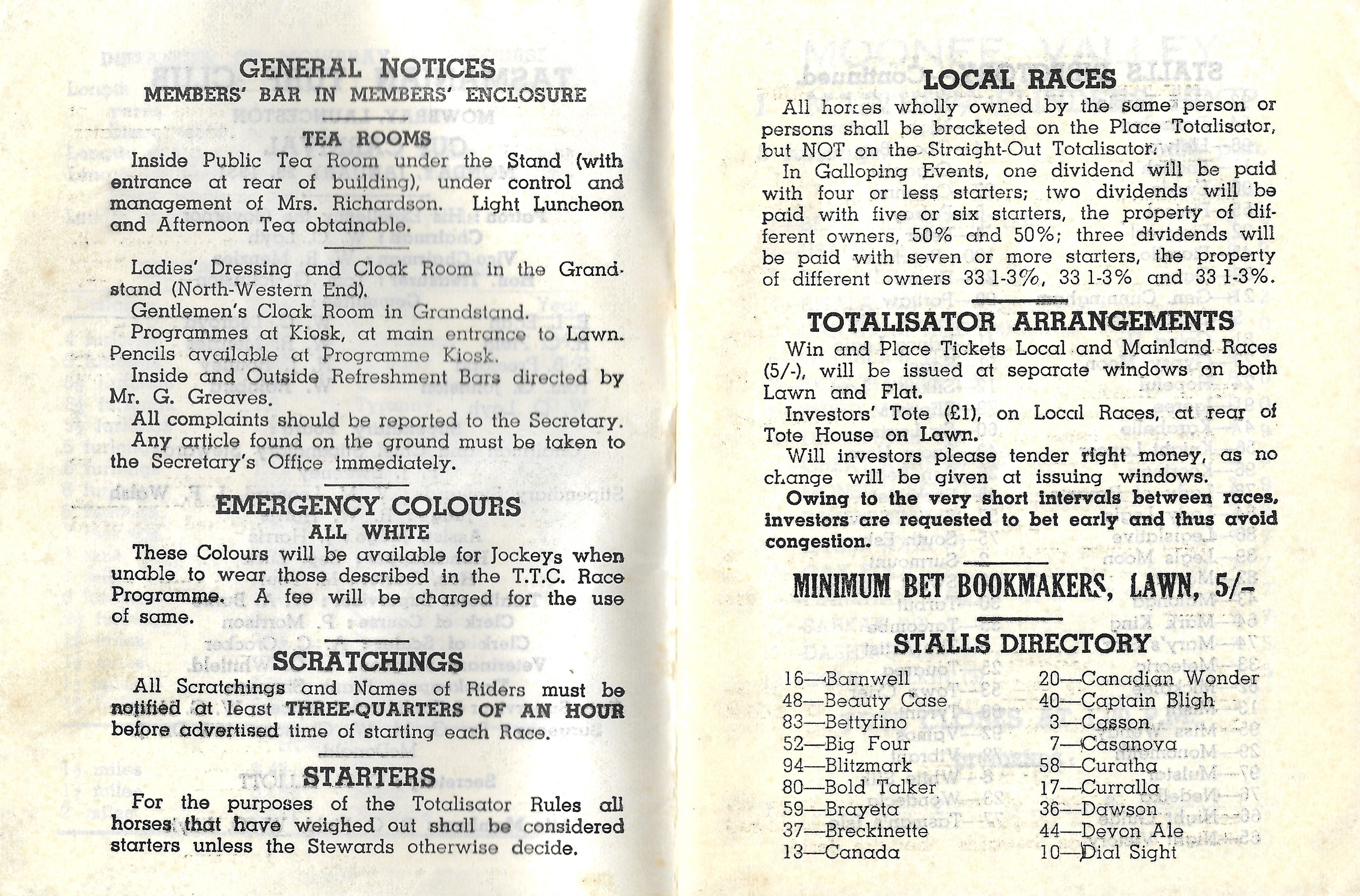
1951 TTC Launceston Cup showing general raceday notices

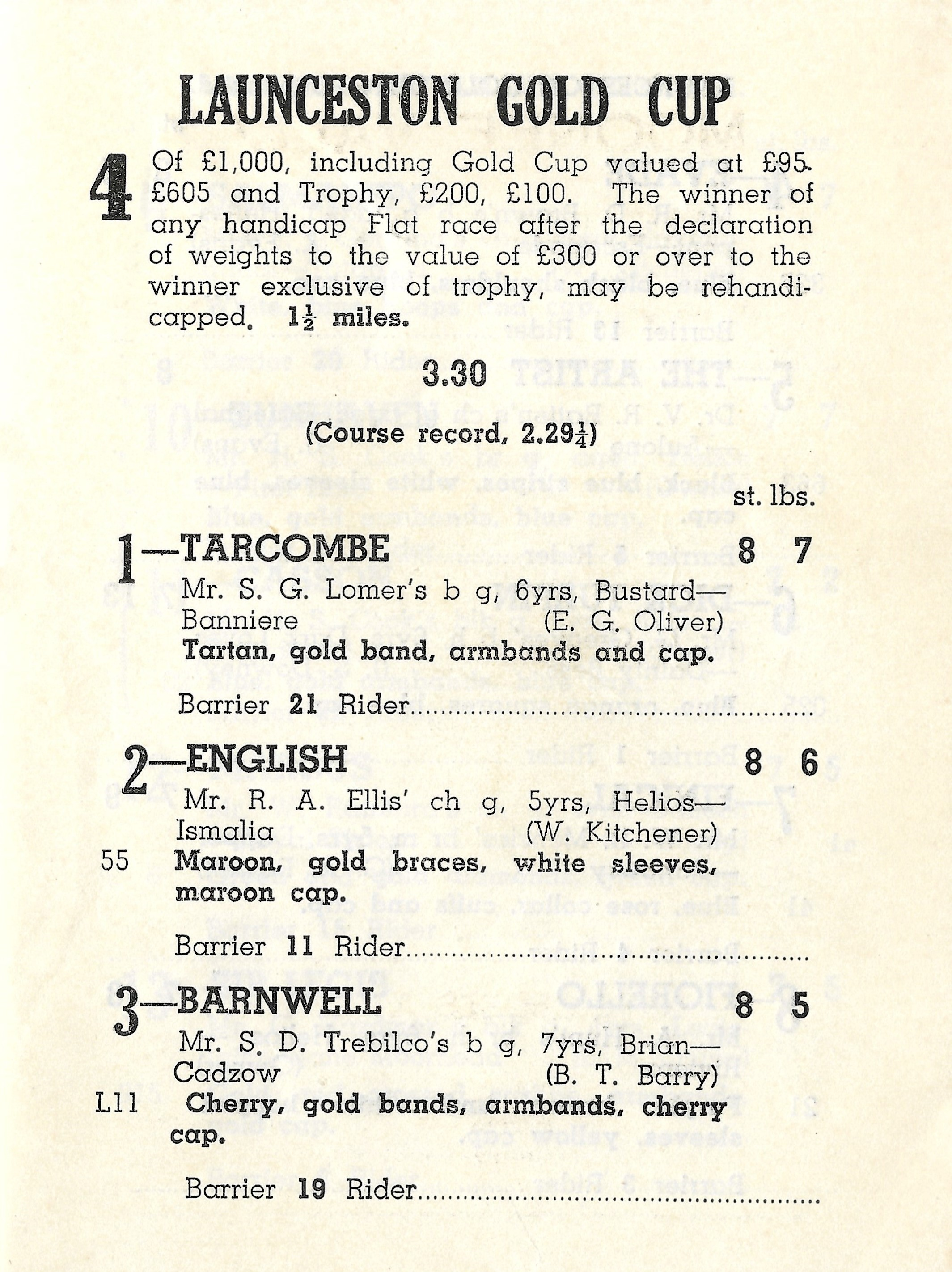
1951 TTC Launceston Cup page showing starters & results

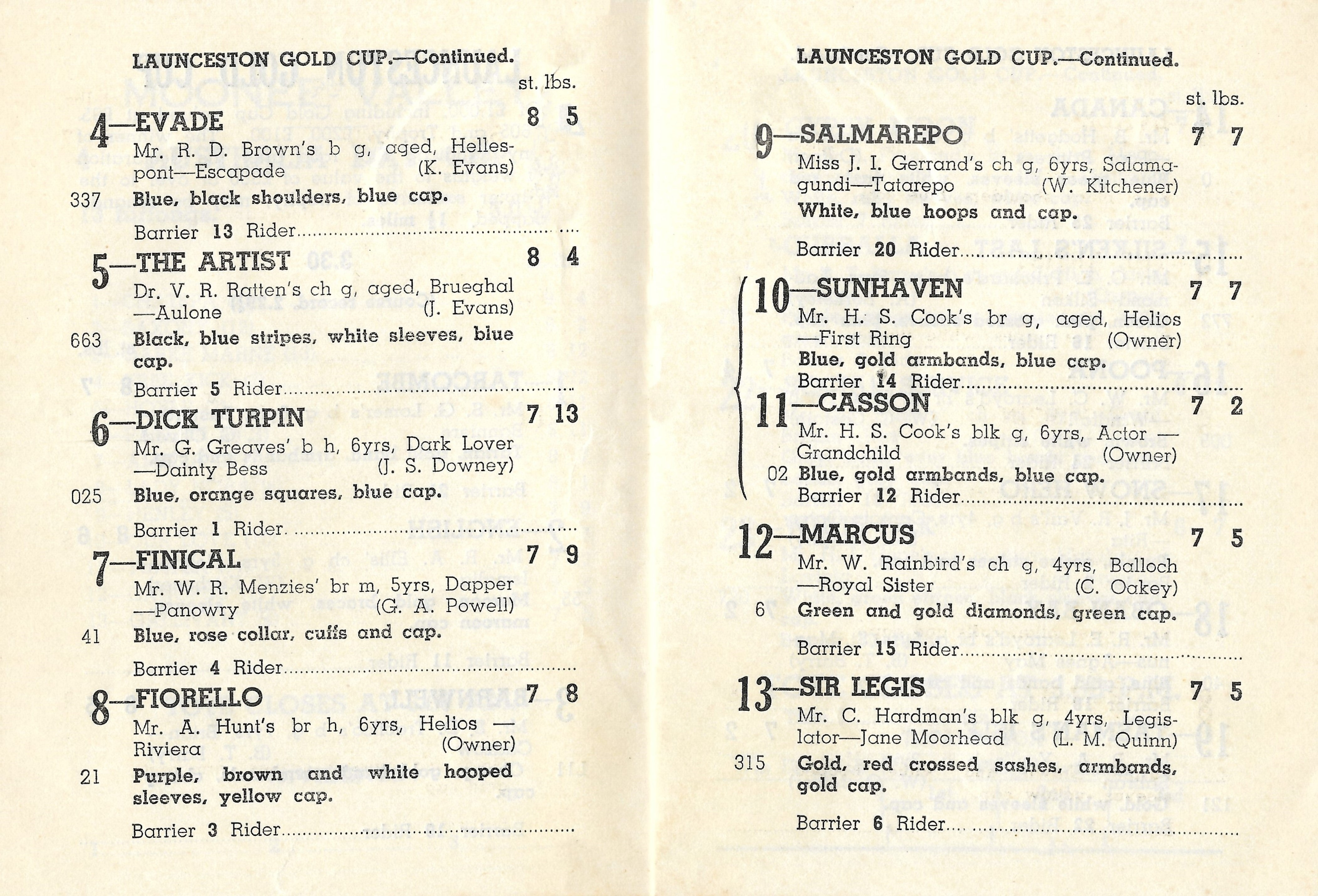
1951 TTC Launceston Cup page showing the winner, Dick Turpin

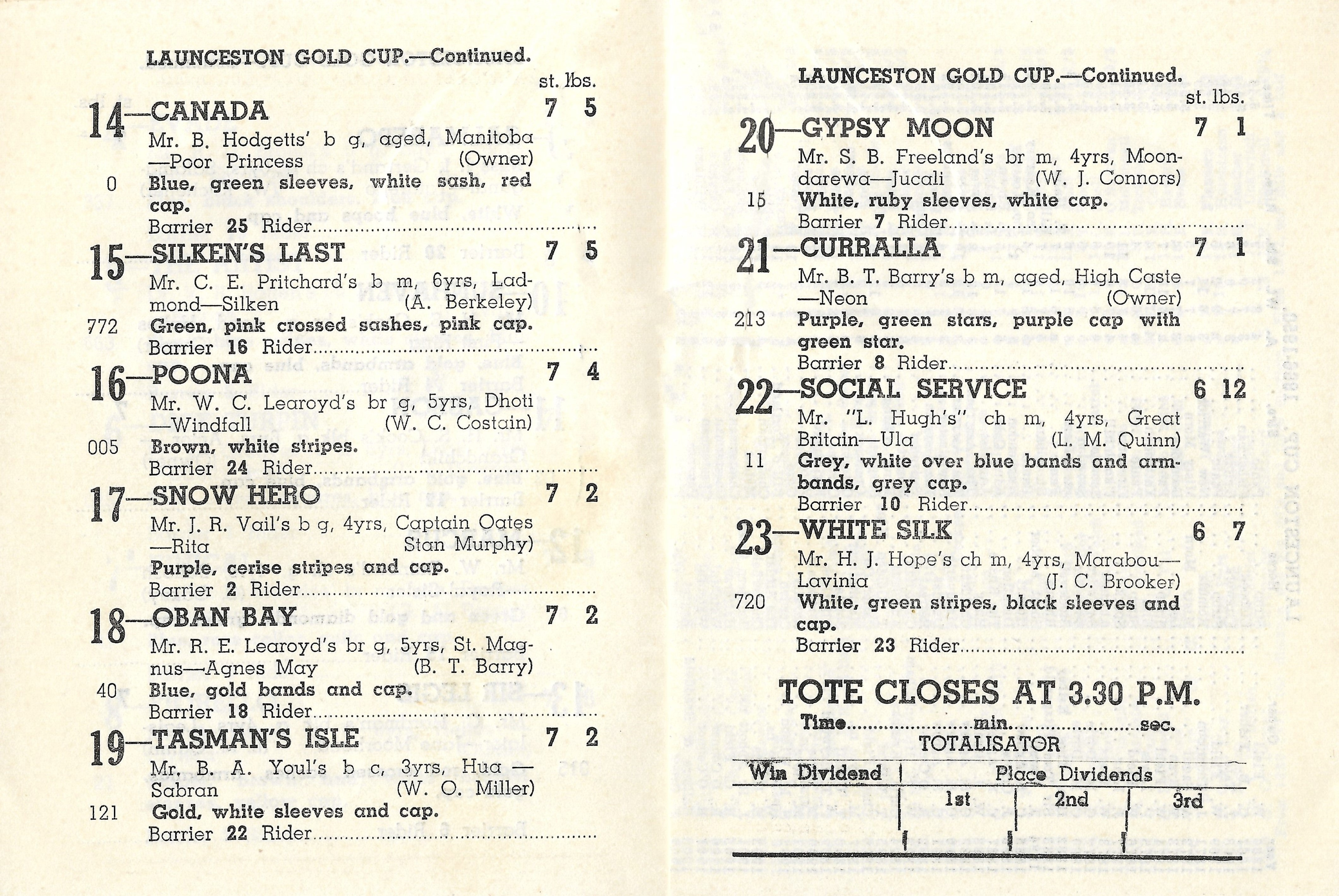
1951 TTC Launceston Cup page showing starters & results

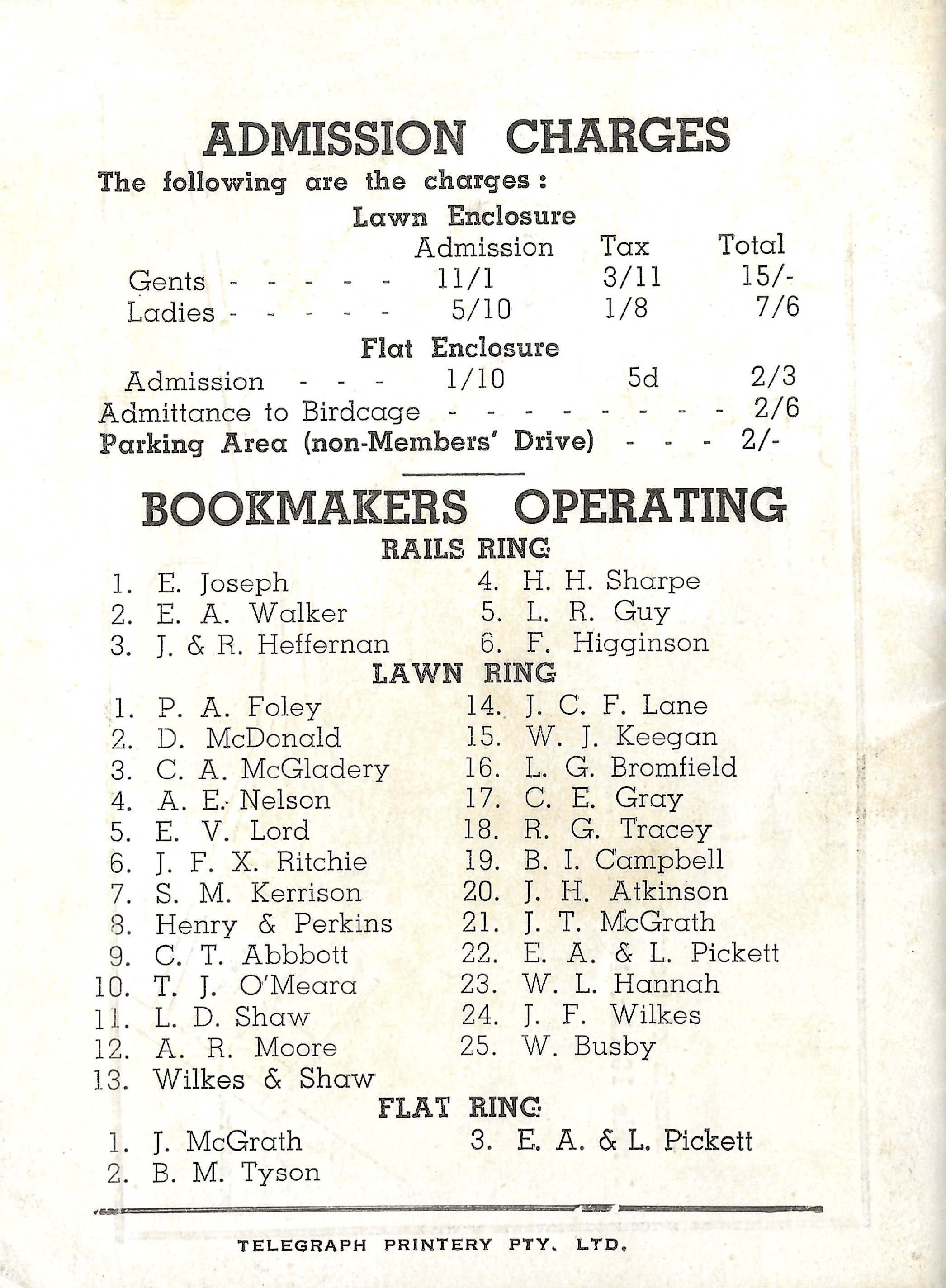
Admission charges and operating bookmakers

== Winners ==
The following are past winners of the race.

- 2026 - Asva
- 2025 - Distrustful Award
- 2024 - Excelleration
- 2023 - Aurora's Symphony
- 2022 - Aurora's Symphony
- 2021 - Glass Warrior
- 2020 - Home By Midnight
- 2019 - Eastender
- 2018 - Bondeiger
- 2017 - Big Duke
- 2016 - Up Cups
- 2015 - Genuine Lad
- 2014 - Epingle
- 2013 - Geegees Blackflash
- 2012 - Prevailing
- 2011 - Fast Future
- 2010 - Larrys Never Late
- 2009 - Zavite
- 2008 - Ista Kareem
- 2007 - Hofmeister
- 2006 - Precise Timing
- 2005 - Dakasha
- 2004 - Zacielo
- 2003 - St. Andrews
- 2002 - St. Andrews
- 2001 - Full Of Rhythm
- 2000 - St. Andrews
- 1999 - Streak
- 1998 - King's Landing
- 1997 - Ticking Away
- 1996 - Free Beer
- 1995 - Free Beer
- 1994 - Rich Dreams
- 1993 - Diamond Bases
- 1992 - Star Cheers
- 1991 - Bitter Spring
- 1990 - Down The Pitch
- 1989 - Shykoski
- 1988 - Superior Way
- 1987 - Brave Trespasser
- 1986 - Epigram
- 1985 - Scruples
- 1984 - Martian's Son
- 1983 - Nifty Red
- 1982 - Andrias
- 1981 - Anzaas
- 1980 - Summer
- 1979 - Jessephenie
- 1978 - Recollect
- 1977 - Brallos
- 1976 - Brallos
- 1975 - King Boongarie
- 1974 - Trader
- 1973 - Woodfield
- 1972 - Shipwright
- 1971 - Neamoc
- 1970 - Red Tornado
- 1969 - Rainbow Isle
- 1968 - Limit
- 1967 - San Sebastian
- 1966 - Nicotera
- 1965 - Marco's Folly
- 1964 - Mayno
- 1963 - Juraco
- 1962 - Native Land
- 1961 - Sweet Maine
- 1960 - Overproof
- 1959 - Wing Shades
- 1958 - Tavua
- 1957 - Lord Carrick
- 1956 - Dongarra
- 1955 - Vamos
- 1954 - Vamos
- 1953 - Lord Burleigh
- 1952 - English
- 1951 - Dick Turpin
- 1950 - Tarcombe
- 1949 - The Artist
- 1948 - Manakau
- 1947 - Miss Dart
- 1946 - Gamelin
- 1945 - Hero
- 1944 - Son O'Val
- 1943 - Entitle
- 1942 - Jane Moorhead
- 1941 - Old Days
- 1940 - Beau Roi
- 1939 - Keeping Watch
- 1938 - Radiant Boy
- 1937 - Royal Barb
- 1936 - Coolart
- 1935 - Gabbler
- 1934 - Baanya
- 1933 - Motive
- 1932 - Finsbury
- 1931 - Darpuna
- 1930 - Tarapunga
- 1929 - Laird O'Cockpen
- 1928 - Lycurgides
- 1927 - Head Girl
- 1926 - Spreadeagle
- 1925 - Seignorina
- 1924 - Amazonia
- 1923 - Seignorina
- 1922 - Royal Reserve
- 1921 - Sand Dune
- 1920 - Trusty Blade
- 1919 - Ordella
- 1918 - Ordella
- 1917 - Bucklaw
- 1916 - Rock Temple
- 1915 - Hayston
- 1914 - Hugli
- 1913 - Uncle Matt
- 1912 - Desire
- 1911 - Loyal Blue
- 1910 - Iliad Drumreagh
- 1909 - Golden Gate
- 1908 - Regret
- 1907 - Wathful
- 1906 - Watchful
- 1905 - Hatteras
- 1904 - Southern Cross
- 1903 - Chesterfield
- 1902 - Cordon The Sirdar
- 1901 - Royalty
- 1900 - Eiridsdale
- 1899 - Flintlock
- 1898 - Sortie
- 1897 - Mountaineer
- 1896 - Caller Ou
- 1895 - Golden King
- 1894 - Amadeus
- 1893 - Comedian
- 1892 - Retreat
- 1891 - Dundas
- 1890 - Macquarie
- 1889 - Chaldean
- 1888 - Ruby
- 1887 - The Knave
- 1886 - Duration
- 1885 - Hobart
- 1884 - Sheet Anchor
- 1883 - Rhesus
- 1882 - Stockwell
- 1881 - race not held
- 1880 - Swiveller
- 1879 - Swiveller
- 1878 - Aldinga
- 1877 - Spark
- 1876 - Strop
- 1875 - Ella
- 1874 - Strop
- 1873 - Leo
- 1872 - Misty Morn
- 1871 - Romula
- 1870 - race not held
- 1869 - Strop
- 1868 - Fireworks
- 1867 - Fishhook
- 1866 - Strop
- 1865 - Panic

== See also ==
- Vamos Stakes
- List of Australian Group races
- List of events in Tasmania
- Group races
