= Ice Hockey Tasmania =

- Sport: Ice hockey
- Jurisdiction: Tasmania
- Founded: 23 August 1950
- Affiliation: Ice Hockey Australia
- Location: 327 Main Rd, Glenorchy Tasmania 7010

Official website
- www.icehockeytasmania.com
- (Australia)
- (Tasmania)

Ice Hockey Tasmania Incorporated, currently trading as Ice Hockey Tasmania, is the governing body of ice hockey in Tasmania, Australia. Ice Hockey Tasmania is a branch of Ice Hockey Australia.

== History ==
=== The First Ice Rink ===
The first ice hockey rink was built in Moonah, an inner suburb of Hobart, at 7 Main Road, Moonah. The surface was a standard international size of 16000sq ft, measuring 85 ft x 185 ft and contained suitable plant to enable the production of block ice for public consumption and provide cool storage lockers to store fruit and other perishable goods. The formation of Tasmanian Glaciarium Ltd. into a public company occurred on 6 July 1950. The Rink differed from any other rinks built in Australia as it was the only open air rink at the time. The rink was opened on 23 October 1950 by the Premier of Tasmania, Robert Cosgrove after being introduced by the managing director of Tasmanian Glaciarium Ltd. Mr. R.L. Worsley to the thousands in attendance.

=== Formation of the Association ===
The first ice hockey association in Tasmania formed on the evening of 23 August 1950 in a special meeting convened by the Nation Fitness Council. The chairman of the council, Max Lyall Moore, said the committee would help further the promotion of ice hockey in the state of Tasmania. Two provisional committees were formed rather than a unified committee, at the advice of Ted Moloney from Melbourne, one for ice skating and the other for ice hockey. Within the meeting the directors of Tasmanian Glaciarium Pty Ltd said the Moonah Glaciarium would be ready to use with a few weeks from this meeting. The first committee for Ice Hockey in Tasmania were: F. J. Ellis, R.W. O'Toole, T. Hope, A.W. Kelly and Alfred Chwalczyk.

=== First Ice Hockey Game in Tasmania ===
The first ice hockey team formed in Tasmania were the Mustangs. They played the first game of ice hockey in Tasmania in front of 3000 people at the first ice carnival held in the Moonah Glaciarium. The first game of ice hockey held in Tasmania was on 29 December 1950 and was between the Mustangs and a team composed of Hobart ice skaters, calling themselves the Red Devils. The Mustangs defeated the Red Devils by a score of 4 – 3.

8 August 1951 while the Mustangs played the Comets during a snowstorm, the match was held up while snow was cleared away due to interfering with play.

== Leagues ==
Ice Hockey Tasmania operates a single senior league out of the Glenorchy Ice Skating Rink along with a development program.

=== Van Diemen's League ===
The Van Diemen's League represents the highest level of senior competition in Tasmania.

The League consists of 5 teams:

- Cougars
- Falcons
- Ice Breakers
- Red Barons
- Sharks

On 4 April 2016 the Van Diemen's League expanded to 5 teams with the addition of the Mighty Ducks, who began as a group of All Star players from Launceston. The debut game for the Mighty Ducks was scheduled for 5 April 2016 at 6:30 pm against the Cougars.

On 6 March 2017 the Van Diemen's League introduced a new team called Ice Breakers, as the Mighty Ducks were not returning. The debut game for the Ice Breakers is scheduled for 4 April 2017 at 7:45 pm against the Barons.

== Presidents ==
- 1952 – W. A. Richards

== See also ==
- Ice Hockey Australia
