= 1945 Sydney to Hobart Yacht Race =

1945 annual yacht race in Australia

1st Sydney to Hobart Yacht Race
Event information
- Type: Yacht
- Dates: 26 December 1945 - 6 January 1946
- Host city: Sydney, Hobart
- Boats: 9
- Distance: 628 nautical miles (1,163 km)

Results
- Winner (1945): Rani (Captain John Illingworth)

Succession
- Previous: None
- Next: Morna (Claude Plowman) in 1946

The 1945 Sydney to Hobart Yacht Race was the inaugural running of the annual "blue water classic", the Sydney to Hobart Yacht Race. It was hosted by the Cruising Yacht Club of Australia based in Sydney, New South Wales.

The race was initially planned to be a cruise planned by Peter Luke, Jack Earl and the Walker brothers who had formed a club for those who enjoyed cruising as opposed to racing.

The plan was changed, however, when a visiting British Royal Navy Officer, Captain John Illingworth, famously suggested, "Why don't we make a race of it?" The inaugural race, like all those that have followed, began on Sydney Harbour, at noon on Boxing Day (26 December), before heading south for 630 nautical miles (1,170 km) through the Tasman Sea, past Bass Strait, into Storm Bay and up the River Derwent, to cross the finish line in Hobart.

The 1945 fleet comprised 9 starters. Of the 9 starters, 8 yachts completed the race. Illingworth's own vessel, Rani, won the inaugural race in a time of 6 days, 14 hours and 22 minutes.

Peter Luke's record for longest-ever time to finish the course stands to this day: 11 days, 6hours, and 20 minutes.

== 1945 Fleet ==
9 yachts registered to begin the 1945 Sydney to Hobart Yacht race. They are:

Yacht	Nation	Skipper	Previous Starts	LH (Elapsed) Time d:hh:mm:ss	HW (Corrected) Time d:hh:mm:ss
Ambermerle	(Australia) (NSW)	J Colquhoun, C Kiel	NA		
Archina	(Australia) (NSW)	P Goldstein	NA	RETIRED	RETIRED
Horizon	(Australia) (NSW)	J R Bartlett	NA		
Kathleen	(Australia)	Jack Earl	NA		
Mistral II	(Australia) (NSW)	Robert Evans	NA		
Rani	(United Kingdom)	Captain John Illingworth, RN	NA	6:14:22:00	4:9:38:00
Saltair	(Australia)	A E and R M Walker	NA		
Wayfairer	(Australia) (NSW)	Peter Luke	NA		
Winston Churchill	(Australia)	P Coverdale	NA		

== Results ==
=== Line Honours results ===
Position	Sail number	Yacht	State/Country	Yacht type	LOA (Metres)	Skipper	Elapsed time d:hh:mm:ss	Ref
1	44	Rani	(United Kingdom) Great Britain	Barber 35 Cutter	10.67	Captain John Illingworth	6:14:22:00	
2	B3	Winston Churchill	Tasmania	Coverdale 52 Cutter	15.66	Percy Coverdale	7:07:38:00	
3	29	Kathleen	New South Wales	Archer 44 Yawl	13.44	Jack Earl	8:06:20:00	
4	CYC 32	Horizon	New South Wales	Bailey 40 Ketch	12.27	J.R. Bartlett	8:07:47:00	
5	CYC 14	Ambermerle	New South Wales	Gronfors 34 Cutter	10.40	John Colquhoun; Clarrie Kiel	8:08:18:00	
6	CYC 59	Mistral II	New South Wales	Alden 63 Schooner	19.32	Robert Evans	8:12:55:00	
7	15	Saltair	New South Wales	Walker 44 Ketch	13.27	Bert & Russell Walker	8:13:48:00	
8	CYC 7	Wayfarer	New South Wales	Alden-Larson 40 Ketch	12.19	Peter Luke	11:06:20:00	
DNF	CYC 20	Archina	New South Wales	Boden 52 Ketch	15.85	Phil Goldstein	Retired	

=== Handicap results ===
Position	Sail number	Yacht	State/Country	Yacht type	LOA (Metres)	Skipper	Corrected time d:hh:mm:ss	Ref
1	44	Rani	(United Kingdom) Great Britain	Barber 35 Cutter	10.67	Captain John Illingworth	4:09:38:00	
2	CYC 14	Ambermerle	New South Wales	Gronfors 34 Cutter	10.40	John Colquhoun; Clarrie Kiel	5:14:39:00	
3	B3	Winston Churchill	Tasmania	Coverdale 52 Cutter	15.66	Percy Coverdale	5:15:20:00	
4	29	Kathleen	New South Wales	Archer 44 Yawl	13.44	Jack Earl	5:15:59:00	
5	CYC 32	Horizon	New South Wales	Bailey 40 Ketch	12.27	J.R. Bartlett	5:19:23:00	
6	15	Saltair	New South Wales	Walker 44 Ketch	13.27	Bert & Russell Walker	5:21:09:00	
7	CYC 59	Mistral II	New South Wales	Alden 63 Schooner	19.32	Robert Evans	7:17:13:00	
8	CYC 7	Wayfarer	New South Wales	Alden-Larson 40 Ketch	12.19	Peter Luke	7:19:43:00	
DNF	CYC 20	Archina	New South Wales	Boden 52 Ketch	15.85	Phil Goldstein	Retired	

== See also ==
- Sydney to Hobart Yacht Race
