= 1956 Sydney to Hobart Yacht Race =

Annual yacht race in Australia

12th Sydney to Hobart Yacht Race
| Date | 26 December 1956 – 3 January 1957 |
| Defender | Even |
| Number of yachts | 28 |
| Coordinates | 33°51.35′S 151°12.40′E- 42°52.7′S 147°19.58′E |
| Winner | Kurrewa IV |
| Official website | Archived on archive.org |

The 1956 Sydney to Hobart Yacht Race, was the 12th annual running of the "blue water classic" Sydney to Hobart Yacht Race.

Hosted by the Cruising Yacht Club of Australia based in Sydney, New South Wales, the 1956 edition began on Sydney Harbour, at noon on Boxing Day (26 December 1955), before heading south for 630 nautical miles (1,170 km) through the Tasman Sea, past Bass Strait, into Storm Bay and up the River Derwent, to cross the finish line in Hobart, Tasmania.

The 1956 Sydney to Hobart Yacht Race comprised a fleet of 28 competitors, an increase of 11 yachts compared to the number in the 1955 race. Line-honours were awarded to Kurrewa IV, which raced out of New South Wales and was owned and skippered by brother's J. & F. Livingston.

== 1956 fleet ==
28 yachts registered to begin the 1953 Sydney to Hobart Yacht race. They are:

| Yacht | Nation | Owner | Skipper | Launch year |
|---|---|---|---|---|
| Kurrewa IV | | J. & F. Livingston | | |
| Solo | | V. Meyer | | |
| Anitra V | | Trgyve and Magnus Halvorsen | | |
| Carol J | | J. Halliday | | |
| Catriona | | D.M. Brown | | |
| Janzoon | | W.R. Slade | | |
| Southern Myth | | N.C. Howard | | |
| Winston Churchill | | Sir Arthur Warner | | |
| Ingrid | | J.S. Taylor | | |
| Siandra | | G.P. Newland | | |
| Ripple | | R.C. Hobson | | |
| Samuel Pepys | | RNSA | | |
| Fantasy | | D. Burridge | | |
| Lahara | | D.N. Ashton | | |
| Lorraine | | D.G. Nicholls | | |
| Tarni | | G. Wignall | | |
| Romava | | R.J. Mercer | | |
| Kurura | | J.A. Clark | | |
| Nirvana | | Dr K. Lewis | | |
| Niripa | | G.E. Peacock | | |
| Tam O'Shanter | | RAN College | | |
| Pha'ar Re | | R. Cottee | | |
| Serenade | | L. Esdaile | | |
| Vailima | | J. McLaren | | |
| Four Winds | | RAN College | | |
| Renene | | P.S. Parry | | |
| Ranston | | A. Roper | | |
| Wraith of Odin | | Dr B. O'Brien | | |

== Results ==
| Line Honours | LH (elapsed) time d:hh:mm:ss | Handicap winner | HW (corrected) time d:hh:mm:ss |
|---|---|---|---|
| Kurrewa IV | 4:04:31:44 | Solo | 3:08:33:52 |

== See also ==
- Sydney to Hobart Yacht Race
