= 1947 Sydney to Hobart Yacht Race =

Annual yacht race in Australia

3rd Sydney to Hobart Yacht Race
Date	26 December 1947 – 31 December 1947
Defender	Morna
Number of Yachts	28
Coordinates	33°51.35′S 151°12.40′E- 42°52.7′S 147°19.58′E
Winner	Morna

The 1947 Sydney to Hobart Yacht Race was the 3rd annual running of the "blue water classic" Sydney to Hobart Yacht Race.

The 1947 edition was once again hosted by the Cruising Yacht Club of Australia based in Sydney, New South Wales. As with the previous two Sydney to Hobart Yacht Races, the 1947 edition began on Sydney Harbour, at noon on Boxing Day (26 December 1947), before heading south for 630 nautical miles (1,170 km) through the Tasman Sea, past Bass Strait, into Storm Bay and up the River Derwent, to cross the finish line in Hobart, Tasmania.

The 1947 Sydney to Hobart Yacht Race involved a fleet of 28 competitors. The first edition, the 1945 Sydney to Hobart Yacht Race had initially been intended to be conducted as a pleasure cruise, but by the 1947 edition, the competitiveness of the event had been well and truly set.

Morna, skippered by Claude Plowman won line honours in a time of 5 days, 3 hours and 3 minutes – exactly 10 minutes slower than its victory the previous year, but giving the vessel and skipper back-to-back wins. Westward, skippered by GD Gibson was awarded handicap honours.

== 1947 fleet ==
28 yachts registered to begin the 1947 Sydney to Hobart Yacht race.

== Results ==
Line Honours	LH (Elapsed) Time d:hh:mm:ss	Handicap Winner	HW (Corrected) Time d:hh:mm:ss
Morna	5:03:03:00	Westward	

== See also ==
- Sydney to Hobart Yacht Race
