= 1952 Sydney to Hobart Yacht Race =

Annual yacht race in Australia

8th Sydney to Hobart Yacht Race
Date	26 December 1952 – 1 January 1953
Defender	Margaret Rintoul
Number of yachts	17
Coordinates	33°51.35′S 151°12.40′E- 42°52.7′S 147°19.58′E
Winner	Nocturne
Official website	http://rolexsydneyhobart.com (archived)

The 1952 Sydney to Hobart Yacht Race, was the eighth annual running of the "blue water classic" Sydney to Hobart Yacht Race.

Hosted by the Cruising Yacht Club of Australia based in Sydney, New South Wales, the 1950 edition began on Sydney Harbour, at noon on Boxing Day (26 December 1952), before heading south for 630 nautical miles (1,170 km) through the Tasman Sea, past Bass Strait, into Storm Bay and up the River Derwent, to cross the finish line in Hobart, Tasmania.

The 1952 Sydney to Hobart Yacht Race comprised a fleet of 17 competitors. The fleet found the going very difficult, and line-honours winner Nocturne, skippered by JR Bull won in the second slowest-ever time of 6 days, 2 hours and 34 minutes. Ingrid, skippered by JS Taylor was awarded handicap honours on adjusted time using the International Measurement System (IMS).

== 1952 fleet ==
17 yachts registered to begin the 1952 Sydney to Hobart Yacht race.

== Results ==
Line Honours	LH (elapsed) time d:hh:mm:ss	Handicap Winner	HW (corrected) time d:hh:mm:ss
Nocturne	6:02:34:00	Ingrid	

== See also ==
- Sydney to Hobart Yacht Race
