= 1953 Sydney to Hobart Yacht Race =

Annual yacht race in Australia

9th Sydney to Hobart Yacht Race
Date	26 December 1953 – 31 December 1953
Defender	Nocturne
Number of yachts	17
Coordinates	33°51.35′S 151°12.40′E- 42°52.7′S 147°19.58′E
Winner	Solveig
Official website	https://web.archive.org/web/20091030152304/http://rolexsydneyhobart.com/default.asp

The 1953 Sydney to Hobart Yacht Race, was the 9th annual running of the "blue water classic" Sydney to Hobart Yacht Race.

Hosted by the Cruising Yacht Club of Australia based in Sydney, New South Wales, the 1953 edition began on Sydney Harbour, at Noon on Boxing Day (26 December 1953), before heading south for 630 nautical miles (1,170 km) through the Tasman Sea, past Bass Strait, into Storm Bay and up the River Derwent, to cross the finish line in Hobart, Tasmania.

The 1953 Sydney to Hobart Yacht Race comprised a fleet of 23 competitors, the largest ever at the time. Line-honours were awarded to Solveig, the Australian racer custom-built of Oregon (Douglas Fir) on Australian hardwood frames in Sydney by the Norwegian family business Lars Halvorsen Sons and skippered by Trygve Halvorsen with Stan Darling as navigator. Solveig won in the time of 5 days, 7 hours and 12 minutes. Solveig is yet today a sound vessel. She was sold by T&M Halvorsen in Hawaii after the 1955 Transpac Race. "Solveig" was shipped by container ship back to Sydney in January 2017 and is now restored and racing on Sydney Harbour with other classic yachts. Ripple, skippered by R. C. Hobson, was awarded handicap honours on adjusted time using the International Measurement System (IMS).

== 1953 fleet ==
23 yachts registered to begin the 1953 Sydney to Hobart Yacht race won by Ripple of Ronald Hobson.

== Results ==
Line Honours	LH (elapsed) time d:hh:mm:ss	Handicap Winner	HW (corrected) time d:hh:mm:ss
Solveig	5:07:12:00	Ripple	

== See also ==
- Sydney to Hobart Yacht Race
