= 1950 Sydney to Hobart Yacht Race =

Annual yacht race in Australia

6th Sydney to Hobart Yacht Race
Date	26 December 1950 – 31 December 1950
Defender	Waltzing Matilda
Number of yachts	16
Coordinates	33°51.35′S 151°12.40′E- 42°52.7′S 147°19.58′E
Winner	Margaret Rintoul
Official website	https://web.archive.org/web/20091030152304/http://rolexsydneyhobart.com/default.asp

The 1950 Sydney to Hobart Yacht Race, was the sixth annual running of the "blue water classic" Sydney to Hobart Yacht Race.

Hosted by the Cruising Yacht Club of Australia based in Sydney, New South Wales, the 1950 edition began on Sydney Harbour, at noon on Boxing Day (26 December 1950), before heading south for 630 nautical miles (1,170 km) through the Tasman Sea, past Bass Strait, into Storm Bay and up the River Derwent, to cross the finish line in Hobart, Tasmania.

The 1950 Sydney to Hobart Yacht Race comprised a fleet of 16 competitors. Margaret Rintoul, skippered by AW Edwards won line honours in a time of 5 days, 5 hours and 28 minutes. Colin Haselgrove's Nerida, was awarded handicap honours on adjusted time.

== 1950 fleet ==
16 yachts registered to begin the 1950 Sydney to Hobart Yacht race.

== Results ==
Line Honours	LH (elapsed) Time d:hh:mm:ss	Handicap winner	HW (corrected) time d:hh:mm:ss
Margaret Rintoul	5:5:28:00	Nerida	

== See also ==
- Sydney to Hobart Yacht Race
