= 1951 Sydney to Hobart Yacht Race =

Annual yacht race in Australia

7th Sydney to Hobart Yacht Race
Date	26 December 1951 – 30 December 1951
Defender	Margaret Rintoul
Number of yachts	14
Coordinates	33°51.35′S 151°12.40′E- 42°52.7′S 147°19.58′E
Line honours winner	Margaret Rintoul
Handicap winner	Struen Marie
Official website	Rolex Sydney Hobart

The 1951 Sydney to Hobart Yacht Race, was the seventh annual running of the "blue water classic" Sydney to Hobart Yacht Race.

Hosted by the Cruising Yacht Club of Australia based in Sydney, New South Wales, the 1951 edition began on Sydney Harbour, at noon on Boxing Day (26 December 1951), before heading south for 630 nautical miles (1,170 km) through the Tasman Sea, past Bass Strait, into Storm Bay and up the River Derwent, to cross the finish line in Hobart, Tasmania.

The 1951 Sydney to Hobart Yacht Race comprised a fleet of 14 competitors. Margaret Rintoul, skippered by AW Edwards won line honours in a new record time of 4 days, 2 hours and 29 minutes, giving both the vessel and skipper back-to-back victories. Struen Marie, skippered by T Williamson was awarded handicap honours on adjusted time.

== 1951 fleet ==
14 yachts registered to begin the 1951 Sydney to Hobart Yacht race.

== Results ==
Line Honours	LH (elapsed) time d:hh:mm:ss	Handicap Winner	HW (corrected) time d:hh:mm:ss
Margaret Rintoul	4:02:29:00	Struen Marie	2:19:48:26

== See also ==
- Sydney to Hobart Yacht Race
