= 1949 Sydney to Hobart Yacht Race =

Annual yacht race in Australia

5th Sydney to Hobart Yacht Race
Date	26 December 1949 – 31 December 1949
Defender	Morna
Number of yachts	15
Coordinates	33°51.35′S 151°12.40′E- 42°52.7′S 147°19.58′E
Winner	Waltzing Matilda
Official website	Rolexsydneyhobart

The 1949 Sydney to Hobart Yacht Race, was the fifth annual running of the "blue water classic" Sydney to Hobart Yacht Race.

Hosted by the Cruising Yacht Club of Australia based in Sydney, New South Wales, the 1949 edition began on Sydney Harbour, at noon on Boxing Day (26 December 1949), before heading south for 630 nautical miles (1,170 km) through the Tasman Sea, past Bass Strait, into Storm Bay and up the River Derwent, to cross the finish line in Hobart, Tasmania.

The 1949 Sydney to Hobart Yacht Race comprised a reduced fleet of 15 competitors. Waltzing Matilda, skippered by Phil Davenport won line honours in a time of 5 days, 10 hours and 33 minutes – breaking the three-year hold on the event by Claude Plowman's Morna. Trade Winds, skippered by Mervyn Davey was awarded handicap honours on adjusted time.

== 1949 fleet ==
15 yachts registered to begin the 1948 Sydney to Hobart Yacht race. They are:

Trade Winds	Nation	Owner ME Davey	Skipper	Launch year

Waltzing Matilda - P Davenport - - elapsed time 5-10-33-10 Second

Ellida - J Halliday - - elapsed time 6-05-26-10 Third

Margaret Rintoul - A Edwards - - elapsed time 5-10-35-01 Fourth

Fortuna - W Fresq - - elapsed time 6-02-05-07 Fifth

Seasalter South Australian RSAYS DH Jarvis DH Jarvis 1937 elapsed time 6-04-50-30 Sixth

Lass O' Luss - J Colquhoun - - elapsed time 6-03-07-35 Seventh

Gipsy Queen - AC Eden - - elapsed time 6-00-45-24 Eighth

Peer Gynt - M&T Halvorsen - - elapsed time6-05-25-35 Ninth

Nocturne - JR Bull - - elapsed time 6-02-08-02 Tenth

Horizon - S Berg - - elapsed time6-06-12-43 Eleventh

Independence - E Messenger - - elapsed time 6-00-15-13 Twelfth

Mistral ll - RF Evans - - elapsed time 6-02-00-54 Thirteenth

Retired Suzanne ll (RA Terrill), Wanderer (E Massey)

== Results ==
Line Honours	LH (elapsed) time d:hh:mm:ss	Handicap winner	HW (corrected) time d:hh:mm:ss
Waltzing Matilda	5:10:33:00	Trade Winds	3:23:39:43

== See also ==
- Sydney to Hobart Yacht Race
