= 1948 Sydney to Hobart Yacht Race =

Annual yacht race in Australia

4th Sydney to Hobart Yacht Race
Date	26 December 1948 – 30 December 1948
Defender	Morna
Number of yachts	18
Coordinates	33°51.35′S 151°12.40′E- 42°52.7′S 147°19.58′E
Winner	Morna
Official website	https://web.archive.org/web/20091030152304/http://rolexsydneyhobart.com/default.asp

The 1948 Sydney to Hobart Yacht Race, was the fourth annual running of the "blue water classic" Sydney to Hobart Yacht Race.

Hosted by the Cruising Yacht Club of Australia based in Sydney, New South Wales, the 1948 edition began on Sydney Harbour, at noon on Boxing Day (26 December 1948), before heading south for 630 nautical miles (1,170 km) through the Tasman Sea, past Bass Strait, into Storm Bay and up the River Derwent, to cross the finish line in Hobart, Tasmania.

The 1948 Sydney to Hobart Yacht Race comprised a reduced fleet of 18 competitors. Wind conditions favoured the fleet, who found excellent going on their trip south.

Morna, skippered by Claude Plowman won line honours in a time of 4 days, 5 hours and 1 minute – breaking the record they set the previous year, and going under 5 days for the first time. The victory also gave the vessel and skipper three wins in-a-row, a record that would not be beaten until Wild Oats XI won four-in-a-row from 2005 to 2008. Westward, skippered by GD Gibson was awarded handicap honours for the second year running.

== 1948 fleet ==
18 yachts registered to begin the 1948 Sydney to Hobart Yacht race.

== Results ==
Line Honours	LH (Elapsed) time d:hh:mm:ss	Handicap winner	HW (Corrected) time d:hh:mm:ss
Morna	4:05:01:00	Westward	

== See also ==
- Sydney to Hobart Yacht Race
