= 1946 Sydney to Hobart Yacht Race =

Annual yacht race in Australia

2nd Sydney to Hobart Yacht Race
Date	26 December 1946 – 4 January 1947
Defender	Rani
Number of yachts	19
Coordinates	33°51.35′S 151°12.40′E- 42°52.7′S 147°19.58′E
Winner	Morna

The 1946 Sydney to Hobart Yacht Race was the second annual running of the "blue water classic" Sydney to Hobart Yacht Race. It was hosted by the Cruising Yacht Club of Australia based in Sydney.

The inaugural race in 1945 had been planned as a cruise, and no thoughts were given to repeating the event. However it became a race at the suggestion of visiting Royal Navy captain John Illingworth, and the race proved so popular a repeat was planned.

The second race began on Sydney Harbour, at noon on Boxing Day (26 December 1946), before heading south for 630 nautical miles (1,170 km) through the Tasman Sea, past Bass Strait, into Storm Bay and up the River Derwent, to cross the finish line in Hobart, Tasmania.

The 1946 expanded fleet comprised more than double the vessels of the inaugural event with 19 starters. Of the 19 starters, 8 yachts were forced to retire, and the remaining 11 made it successfully to Hobart, with Morna captained by Claude Plowman winning line honours, and Christina captained by JR Bull taking handicap honours on adjusted time.

== 1946 fleet ==
19 yachts registered to begin the 1946 Sydney to Hobart Yacht Race. They were:

Yacht	Nation	Skipper	Previous starts	LH (elapsed) time d:hh:mm:ss	HW (corrected) time d:hh:mm:ss
Active	(Australia) (NSW)	HM Tate	NA		
Christina	(Australia) (NSW)	JR Bull	NA		4:11:53:27
Connella	(Australia) (NSW)	BR O'Brien	NA	RETIRED	RETIRED
Defiance	(Australia) (NSW)	FA Bullock	NA		
Fegmhr	(Australia) (NSW)	FA Harris	NA		
Ilex	(New Zealand) (Wgtn)	NW Thomas	NA	RETIRED	RETIRED
Kalua	(Australia)	D McAllister	NA	RETIRED	RETIRED
Kurrewa III	(Australia) (NSW)	F & J Livingston	NA		
Mathew Flinders	(Australia)	A Palfreyman	NA		
Merlan	(Australia) (NSW)	WL Curtis	NA	RETIRED	RETIRED
Mistral II	(Australia) (NSW)	R Evans	NA		
Morna	(Australia) (NSW)	C Plowman	NA	5:02:53:33*	
Osirius	(Australia)	JS Booth	NA	RETIRED	RETIRED
Saga	(Australia) (NSW)	BJ Halvorsen	NA		
Southern Maid	(Australia) (NSW)	C Philp	NA		
Trade Winds	(Australia) (NSW)	M Davey	NA		
Unis J	(Australia) (NSW)	BW Davies	NA	RETIRED	RETIRED
Wayfarer	(Australia) (NSW)	P Luke	NA		
Winston Churchill	(Australia)	P Coverdale	NA	RETIRED	RETIRED

== Results ==
Line honours	LH (elapsed) time d:hh:mm:ss	Handicap winner	HW (corrected) time d:hh:mm:ss
(Australia) Morna	5:02:53:33*	(Australia) Christina	4:11:53:27

== See also ==
- Sydney to Hobart Yacht Race
