= Jack Earl (Australian sailor) =

Australian sailor and artist

Jack Beaumont Earl OAM (1908–1994), was an Australian sailor and noted marine artist. He achieved fame as the captain of the Kathleen Gillett, the second Australian yacht to sail around the world. He was also one of the founders of the Sydney to Hobart Yacht Race and the Cruising Yacht Club of Australia.

== Early life ==
Jack Beaumont Earl was born in Durban, South Africa, in 1908 before emigrating to Australia in 1911. His childhood was spent on Darnley Island in the Torres Strait where his father was an administrator and schoolteacher. Earl learnt to sail with the Islander children in dugout canoes and in pearling luggers around the islands of northern Australia. Schooling required a move to Sydney.

As a young man, Earl earned a living as an artist for the newspapers Truth and the Sunday Times.

In 1933 Earl married the school teacher and author Kathleen Gillett. Gillett was from a seafaring family. At the time of his marriage Earl was living on a cabin boat at Rushcutters Bay.

Earl and Kathleen had two children, Mick and Maris.

== The Kathleen Gillett ==
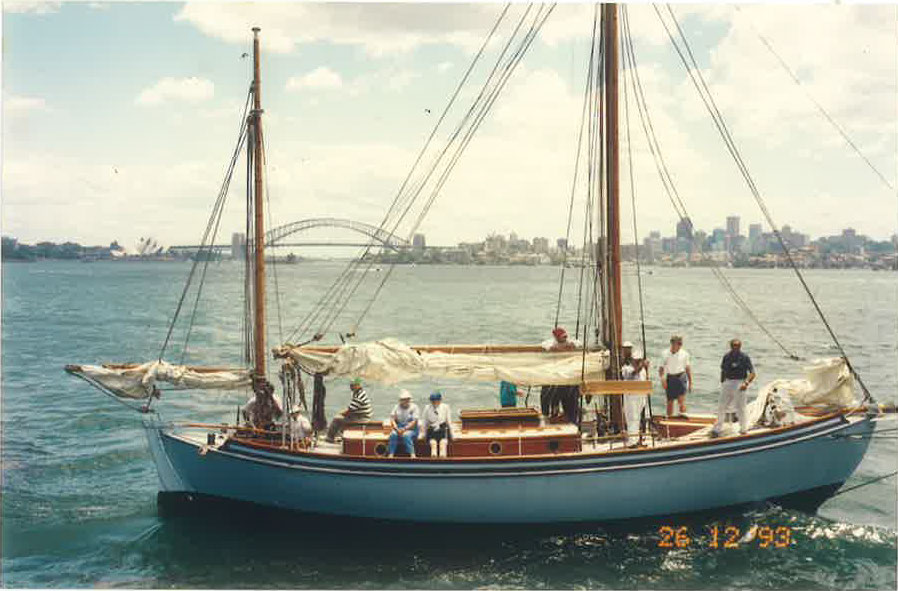
The 'Kathleen' on Sydney Harbour, Boxing Day, 1993

Prior to World War II Jack Earl and Kathleen spent six years designing and building the ketch 'Kathleen Gillett'. 'Kathleen' was a 43’ gaff rigged ketch based on designs by renowned Norwegian naval architect Colin Archer. She was built at Gladesville, Sydney by Charlie Larsen in 1939, and moored in both Mosman and Rushcutters Bays during World War II. 'Kathleen' was used for coastal sea patrols during this period.

== Circumnavigation ==
Earl had originally planned to sail around the world with his family, however finances and practicalities meant the decision was made for Kathleen Earl and the children to stay at home. 'Kathleen' left Sydney Harbour in June 1947, with thousands lining the shore to see her off.

'Kathleen's' crew consisted of Jack Day, Keith Humphries, Lyell (Mick) Morris and Don Angus (navigator). Humphries left the yacht in Queensland due to seasickness, and Will ‘Digger’ Sinclair joined the yacht in Durban. The circumnavigation took 18 months and covered 26,000 nautical miles and garnered great public interest throughout Australia, helped by regular feature stories in Seacraft magazine.

Earl painted pictures during the voyage to pay for supplies.

Earl sold the 'Kathleen Gillett' in 1950, and after many owners and trials, in 1988 the Norwegian government presented the boat to the Australian National Maritime Museum as a bicentennial gift, where it remains in sailing condition.

=== Log Books ===
Earl created 12 elaborately illustrated log books documenting the circumnavigation. The logs were intermittently sent home when the 'Kathleen' reached port, and not only documented the voyage, but served as letters to his wife. The original log books are held in the collection of the NSW State Library (Mitchell Library). A facsimile limited edition of 200 copies was published by Weldon Publishing in 1991.

== Sydney to Hobart race ==
Earl, a founding member of the CYCA, was integral to the foundation of the Sydney to Hobart yacht race, when a planned cruise by Earl to celebrate the end of WWII was turned into a race with friends featuring nine yachts who left Sydney on Boxing Day in 1945. The race was won by the Englishman Captain John Illingworth's 'Rani', and the 'Kathleen Gillett' finished third on handicap.

== Artist ==
Earl has been described as Australia's leading maritime artist, painting yachts and historical maritime events on commission. He was initially trained in art by his father Frank, whose own father was the highly regarded British artist, George Earl. Jack Earl later studied at the Julian Ashton Art School, and the Royal Art Society. Other immediate members of the Earl family were also world renowned artists and include Maude Earl (1863–1943), Thomas Percy Earl and Thomas William Earl, and Jack's daughter, Maris Earl.

In the 1950s, he became a full time marine artist. Earl's work is popular in yacht clubs around the world.

== Awards ==
Earl was awarded an OAM for service to yachting and to marine art in the 1994 Australia Day Honours List.

Earl was awarded the Cruising Yacht Club of Australia's Blue Water Medal and was inducted into the CYCA hall of fame in 2019.

== Bibliography ==
- Jack Earl: The Life and Art of a Sailor by Bruce Stannard, Weldon Publishing, 1991, ISBN 978-1863021760
