= North 26 =

Boat designed by Julian D Everitt

The North 26 is a boat designed by Julian D Everitt, who also designed the E-boat, in Cowes, England in 1982. Big brother to the E-boat, the North 26 is intended to rate under IRC measurement rules for the English Channel for Yacht racing inshore and in Junior Offshore Group races. The North 26 has a wide, flat sole plate that enables it to sit in the mud in English ports with the keel retracted. This feature also enables safe beach sitting whilst cruising and use as a Trailer yacht.

== Specifications ==
LOA Length	25 ft 3 in (8 m)
Waterline length (LWL)	23 ft 6 in (7.16 m)
Beam Width	9 ft 0 in (2.74 m)
Draft Board down	5 ft 6 in (1.68 m)
Draft Board up	1 ft 0 in (0.3 m)
Displacement	4150 lb (1890 kg)min. sailing
Ballast	1700 lb ( 770 kg)
Tow Mass	3700 lb (1680 kg)+ trailer + gear
Rigging	3/4 Fractional rig sloop
Mast	36 ft 6 in ( 11.6 m)	varies, 2 or 3 spreader
Sails	Main	223 ft² ( 20.7 m²)
Sails	Jib < (100%)	ft² ( m²)
Sails	#1 Genoa ( %)	204 ft² ( 20.7 m²)
Sails	#2 Genoa ( %)	125 ft² ( 11.61 m²)
Sails	#3 Genoa ( %)	89 ft² ( 8.27 m²)
Spinnaker	490 ft² ( 45.52 m²)

I = 29.3 ft (8.33 m)

J = 8.9 ft (2.71 m)

P = 33.3 ft (10.15 m)

E = 11.9 ft (3.63 m)

== Sailing details ==
Handicaps:

- PHRF = ,

 Portsmouth = ,
 IRC  = about 0.934 (1999),

Class-based handicaps: CBH (Aust.) = 0.7280 prov. (2000) aluminium cruising,

  Other = ,

Sailing characteristics: A long waterline boat, easily driven, while providing comfortable accommodation and safe cruising.

Notable performances: First in the UK 'Round the Island' race non-IOR against 700 yachts. First in Tomatin Triohy as scratch boat giving J 24's nearly 2 minutes an hour handicap advantage.

== Accommodations ==
With a waterline length of 26 ft. 6 in. and a beam of 9 ft. 0 in., the North 26 is slightly smaller than an average ½ ton yacht.

The standard layout contains two separate cabins and a separate toilet compartment. The forward cabin contains a full-length V-berth. The main salon has a full-length settee on the starboard side with deep lockers, below the deck. A quarter berth extends beneath the cockpit on the same side. On the port side is the galley with built-in two-burner spirit stove, a sink and a deep icebox beside the companionway. A folding table can be hinged from the center board case with a short settee on the port side. An alternative layout would allow for two full-length settees and two quarter berths with the galley above the port side and the use of a portable icebox.

The boat can accommodate up to 6 people.

Number of crew to race = 4 or 5, Berths = 5 or 6, Galley =provision for 2 burner stove and sink, portable icebox. Water bladder. Head = portable in separate compartment, Navigation =in salon, Maximum headroom = 5.5 ft, 1.75 m, to standard plan. But 5 ft 11 in (1.88 m) in versions where 5 inches (125 mm) added to the hull freeboard, allows full standing headroom for most people.

== Special features ==
Outboard motor housed in locker with bomb-bay doors at companionway. Doors close up when sailing. Hydraulic operated keel lifting. Keel can be bolted down when racing.

The halyards and sheets lead back to the companionway for central control including mainsail furling, two winches located on the cabin top and two on the side decks handle all tasks. The mast design chosen avoids the need for running backstays, as these are definitely a hindrance and safety problem when cruising short handed.

A deep anchor locker is provided in the bow, ample room for an electric winch. When the outboard is lowered in its bridge-deck well, the propeller is on the centerline of the boat and well forwards of the stern, so that even in rough conditions the prop will not come out of the water, a problem with stern-mounted outboards. When not in use, the outboard is out of the way and protected without the need for heavy lifting and removal each trip.

Towable with large 4 WD of about 4 liters, depending on local transport regulations.

== Construction ==
Country of origin, UK

Hull material, design for Ply, Aluminum or Fiberglass. Multichine for ease of amateur construction. The boat is built inverted for ease of access, using fabricated ply or aluminum frames. To minimize ply wastage and enable quick fit out the bulkheads form part of the furniture. There is no need for full size patterns as each frame is fully dimensioned on the drawings. West system epoxy impregnation is used on the ply boats for strength and durability. In aluminum either tubular or RHS stringers are used as weld backing for 3 mm plates. A 6 mm plate in aluminum or 18mm in ply is used for the sole plate which ensures strength for sitting the beach.

Manufacturer, Owner built or professional boat builder
