= Sailing in Australia =

Sailing is a popular sport and recreational activity in Australia with its varied coastline and often warm climate.

Australian Sailing is the peak body in charge of sailing as recognised by the International Sailing Federation In 2017-18 there were over 80,000 registered sailors and over 16,000 events held across the country.

== Clubs ==
Sailing Clubs are common in Australia. Large cities have significant numbers of clubs catering to boats from off the beach dinghies to serious ocean racing. Sydney for example, has over 40 sailing clubs. Most moderate sized towns with sailable water nearby have a sailing club. Many clubs hold weekly races, annual championships and annual races.

== Sailing Associations ==
Australia has a large number associations ranging from one design class associations, which sail boats bound by strict rules to open associations for development and broad communities of boats. Associations are generally at a national level with state based subsidiaries, although some associations are state based where they represent classes or communities that are only found in one state. In 2019, Sailing Australia affiliated ### class and other associations, although not all class associations are affiliated.

Associations often hold annual state and national championships.

== Major events ==
The Sydney Hobart Yacht Race is the premier blue water Australian race, starting on Sydney Harbour on Boxing Day every year. The race attracts a wide variety of boats from supermaxi yachts to small private boats. The race was first held in 1945.

The Melbourne to Hobart Yacht Race starts on 27 January in Port Phillip Bay. Racers trace a course down the rugged west coast of Tasmania and along the south coast to Hobart.

Hamilton Island Race Week held in the Whitsunday Islands in Queensland in August is Australia's largest offshore regatta attracting over 250 boats.

== Historical racing events ==
Australia hosted the 1956 Olympics in Melbourne and the 2000 Olympics in Sydney including the respective sailing events.

In 1983, Australia sailing in Australia II defeated the United States of America in the America's Cup, ending their 132-year stranglehold on the cup. This is considered one of the greatest moments in Australian sports history. The following America's Cup was held in 1987 in Perth with Australia losing the cup.

== Sailing around the states ==
=== Australian Capital Territory ===
Competitive sailing is based around Lake Burley Griffin in Canberra.

=== New South Wales ===
Sydney is a mecca for sailing with Sydney Harbour, Botany Bay and Pittwater providing abundant sheltered water for sailing races for boats from small dinghies to large keel boats.

Australia Day regatta is held on 26 January every year. It is the world's oldest continuously held regatta, first held in 1837.

Sailing was popular in Sydney from as early as 1900. Joshua Slocum commented in his account of his first around the world voyage that sailing was a popular sport.

=== Queensland ===
Sailing on Moreton Bay. Whitsunday Islands offer excellent cruising. Brisbane to Gladstone yacht race Bay to Bay yacht race

=== South Australia ===
There are a number of off-the-beach sailing clubs along Adelaide's metropolitan coastline on the eastern side of the Gulf St Vincent with other clubs at major towns along the coast. Major yacht clubs are located in marinas around Port Adelaide and North Haven.

The Lake Eyre Yacht Club is notable as its events take place on a dry lake, which is only infrequently filled. In 2010, it held a regatta for the first time in over 20 years.

South Australia offers excellent cruising grounds within Spencer Gulf and St Vincent Gulf with numerous islands, and the coasts of the Eyre, Yorke and Fleurieu peninsulas, as well as the coast of Kangaroo Island.

=== Tasmania ===
Sailing in Tasmania focuses on the sheltered waters of the River Derwent around Hobart as well as in Launceston.

The Royal Hobart Regatta is held on the River Derwent annually in February. It was first held in 1838 and involves a wide range of water sports including sailing.

The Launceston to Hobart Yacht Race is held annually beginning on 27 December.

=== Northern Territory ===
Darwin has two yacht clubs, the Darwin Sailing Club and the Dinah Beach Cruising Yacht Association.

The Darwin Ambon Yacht Race is held in August annually.

=== Victoria ===
In Victoria, sailing is centred on Port Phillip Bay and Western Port Bay.

Sail Melbourne is an annual sailing Regatta run by Yachting Victoria at various yacht clubs around Port Phillip Bay. Sail Melbourne is a Grade 1 International Sailing Federation event and is the largest off the beach regatta in the Southern Hemisphere.

=== Western Australia ===
Sailing centred on the Swan River in Perth.

The Fremantle to Bali yacht race and rally is a 2500 km yacht race starting in May.
