= Albert Lee (Paralympian) =

Australian double leg amputee athlete (born 1962)

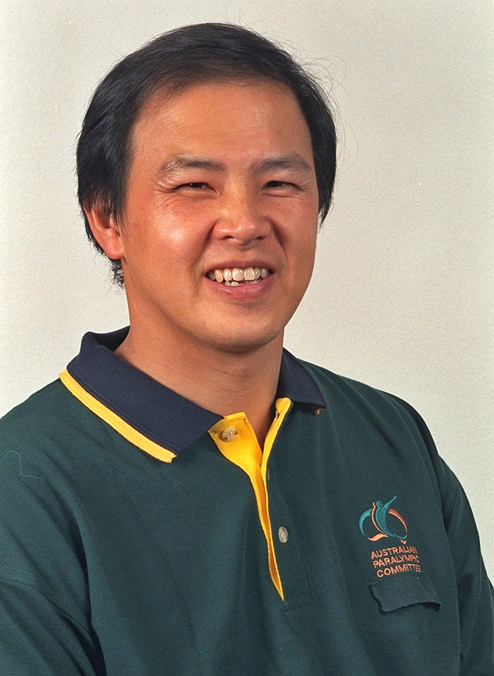

Personal information
- Nickname: Bert or bertie
- National team: Australia's sitting volleyball 2000 Paralympic team
- Born: 17 October 1962 (age 64)
- Education: UNSW
- Occupation: Optometrist
- Spouse: Anne Lee
- Children: 2
- Other interests: Sailing, philanthropy

Sport
- Country: Australia
- Sport: sitting volleyball
- Disability: double leg amputee

Achievements and titles
- Paralympic finals: Team placed 11th at the 2000 Paralympics for sitting volleyball

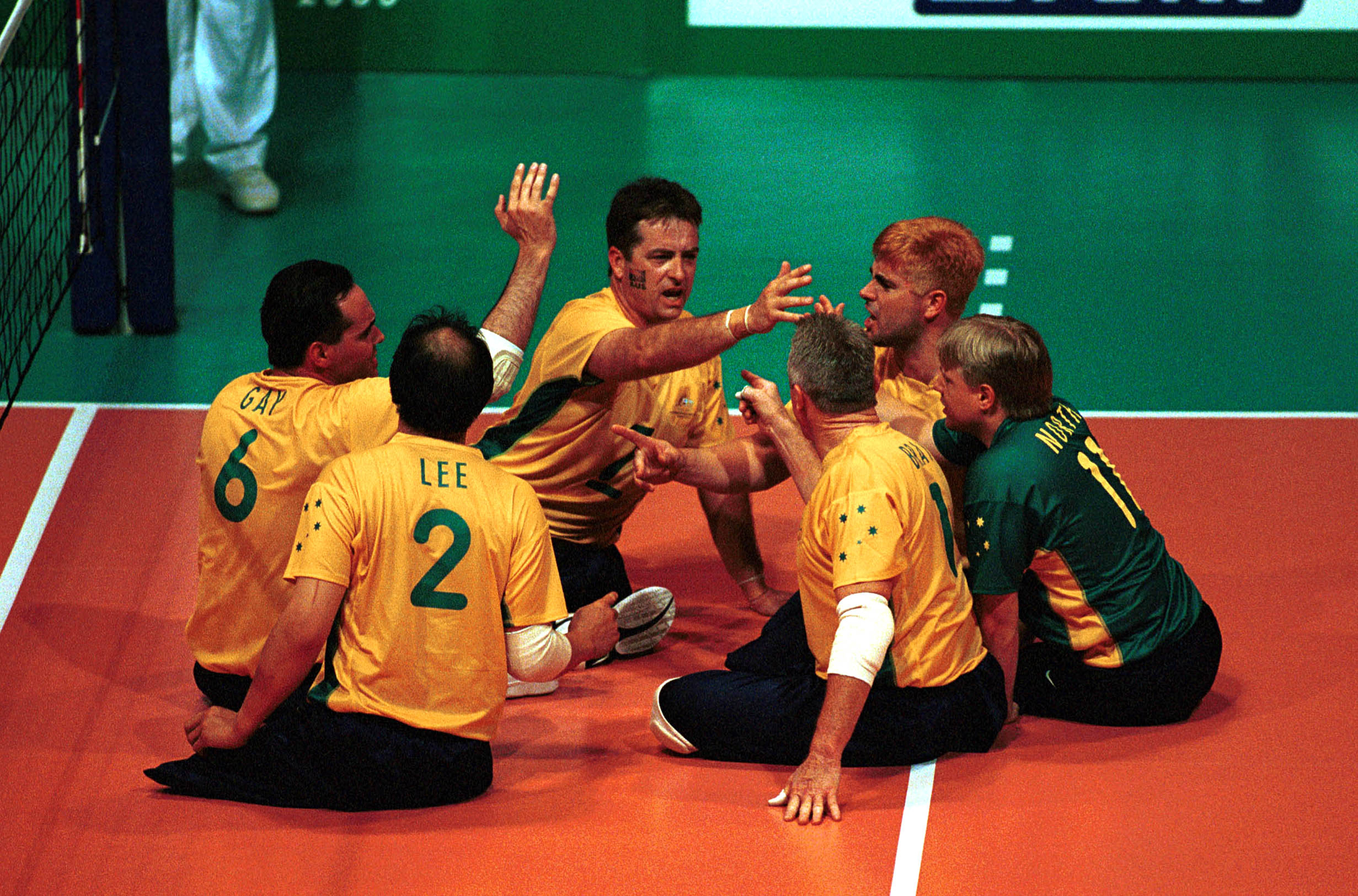
Lee and his team playing sitting volleyball at the 2000 Paralympic games

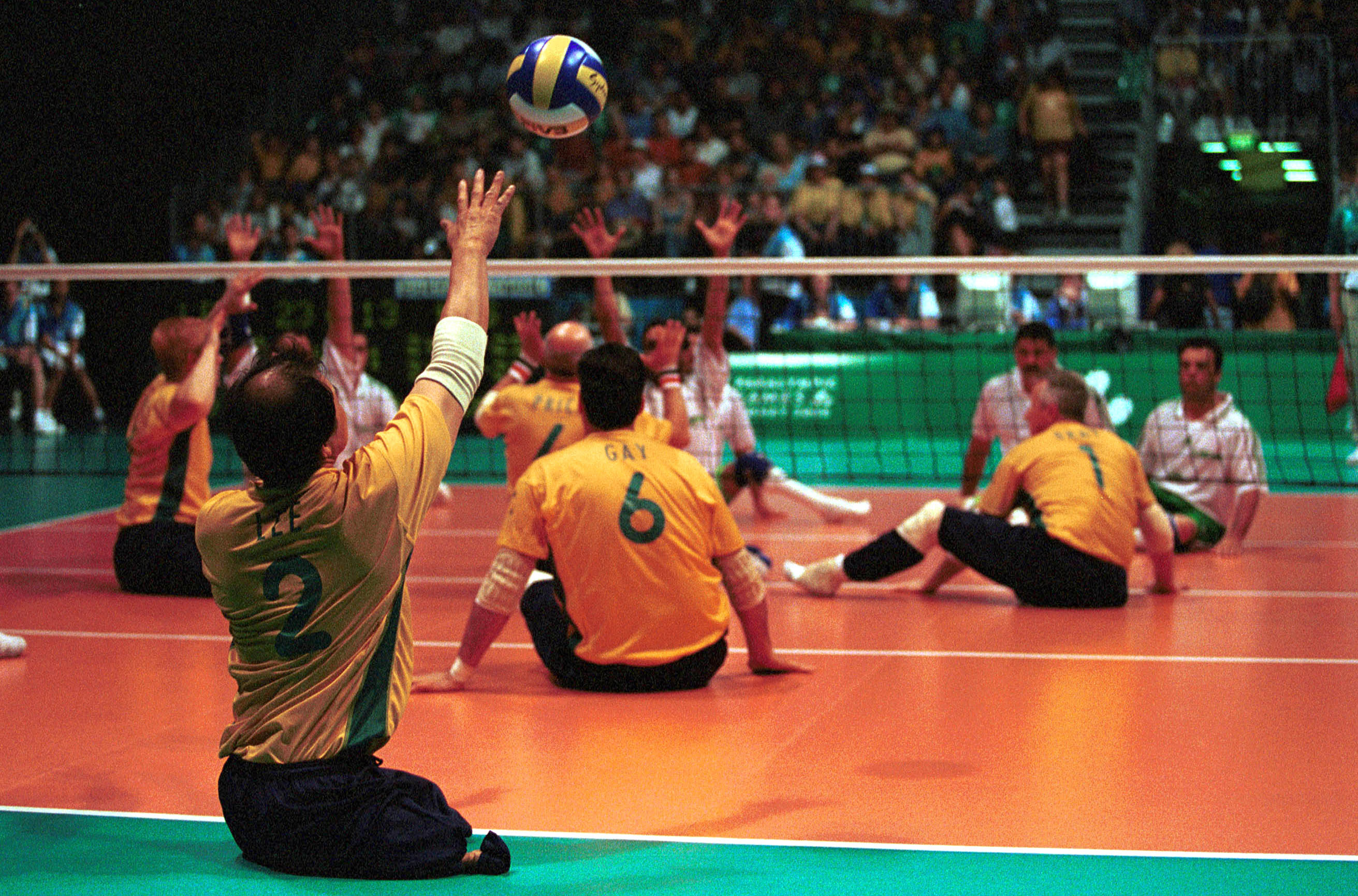
Lee serving in a sitting volleyball match during the 2000 Paralympics

Albert Lee (born 17 October 1962) is an Australian double leg amputee athlete who participated at the 2000 Summer Paralympics in sitting volleyball. Lee lost his legs in a train accident when he was 20 years old. Despite this, he has competed in the Sydney to Hobart Yacht race, achieved world records, and is a qualified optometrist who studied at the University of New South Wales. Lee is involved in many philanthropic activities and has a multitude of appointments.

== Personal life ==
Lee was born on 17 October 1962. He married his wife Anne in 1998. Together they have two sons – Jonathan and Mitchel. Lee has interests in team sports, fitness, and adventures. Lee lives in Sydney where he is a registered optometrist.

== Amputation ==
On February 20, 1983, Lee was in involved in an accident where he fell under a train This accident created the need for both of his legs to be amputated at the knee. At this time, Lee was twenty years old and in his third year of studying at a tertiary level.

In Australia, there are 8000 lower limb amputations performed annually due to various causes. Sex, age and type 2 diabetes are all key factors when determining the relative risk rate for lower limb amputations in the Australia. Being male can result in a 15-32% increase in relative risk for lower limb amputation.

When amputation occurs at a younger age - less than 35 years old - the effect on risk rate due to sex is emphasized. By being a young male, one would be at a higher relative risk for lower limb amputation due to any cause than one's female counterparts at that stage of life.

== Sporting career ==
Lee participates in sports and he has significant achievements in sitting volleyball and sailing.

=== Sitting volleyball ===
Lee represented Australia at the 2000 Paralympics for sitting volleyball which was held from 18 until 29 October in Sydney, Australia. The team consisted of 11 members which included Edward Bray, Paul Croft, Darren Gay, Lee, Brant North, Kevin Price, Glenn Pyne, Brett Roworth, Greg Sobczak, Bruce Thompson, and Mark Whiteman.

The team known as the 'Crabs', played five matches in the preliminary round of the competition where they were placed in group B and were to play against teams from Egypt, Finland, Bosnia and Herzegovina, Libya, and Korea. They lost to Egypt, Finland, Bosnia and Herzegovina, and Korea by 3 sets to 0. They also lost to Libya by 3 sets to 2. The team played 2 further matches in the classification rounds of the competition. In the classification for places 9–12, the team lost to Japan by 3 sets to 1. In the classification for places 11 and 12, the team managed their first international win against the United States of America by 3 sets to 1. This was the only win resulted in the team finishing eleventh out of the twelve teams that competed.

=== Sailing ===
Lee joined the Making Waves foundation in 1994, shortly after it established. His position on the Yacht is mid bow where he assists the bowman with everything on the foredeck and his nickname is Bert or Bertie. He has competed in the Sydney to Hobart yacht race, he has crewed in the Pittwater to Coffs Harbor race, setting a world record.

When Lee gets on board, he removes his prosthetic legs, due to this action he has a lower center of gravity which allows him to stick to the deck. He uses his arms to quickly move around the boat and can get to hard to reach places because of his proximity to the deck. He is able to move around the yacht with more ease than non-disabled crew who would need to crouch and crawl to reach the spaces he can. Lee has always been amazed by the adventurous sport of sailing and has said that being "out on the water in tune with nature is an amazing thing". Lee enjoys sailing as it allows one to recognize one's own strengths and weaknesses and forces him to adapt accordingly.

==== Sydney to Hobart yacht race ====
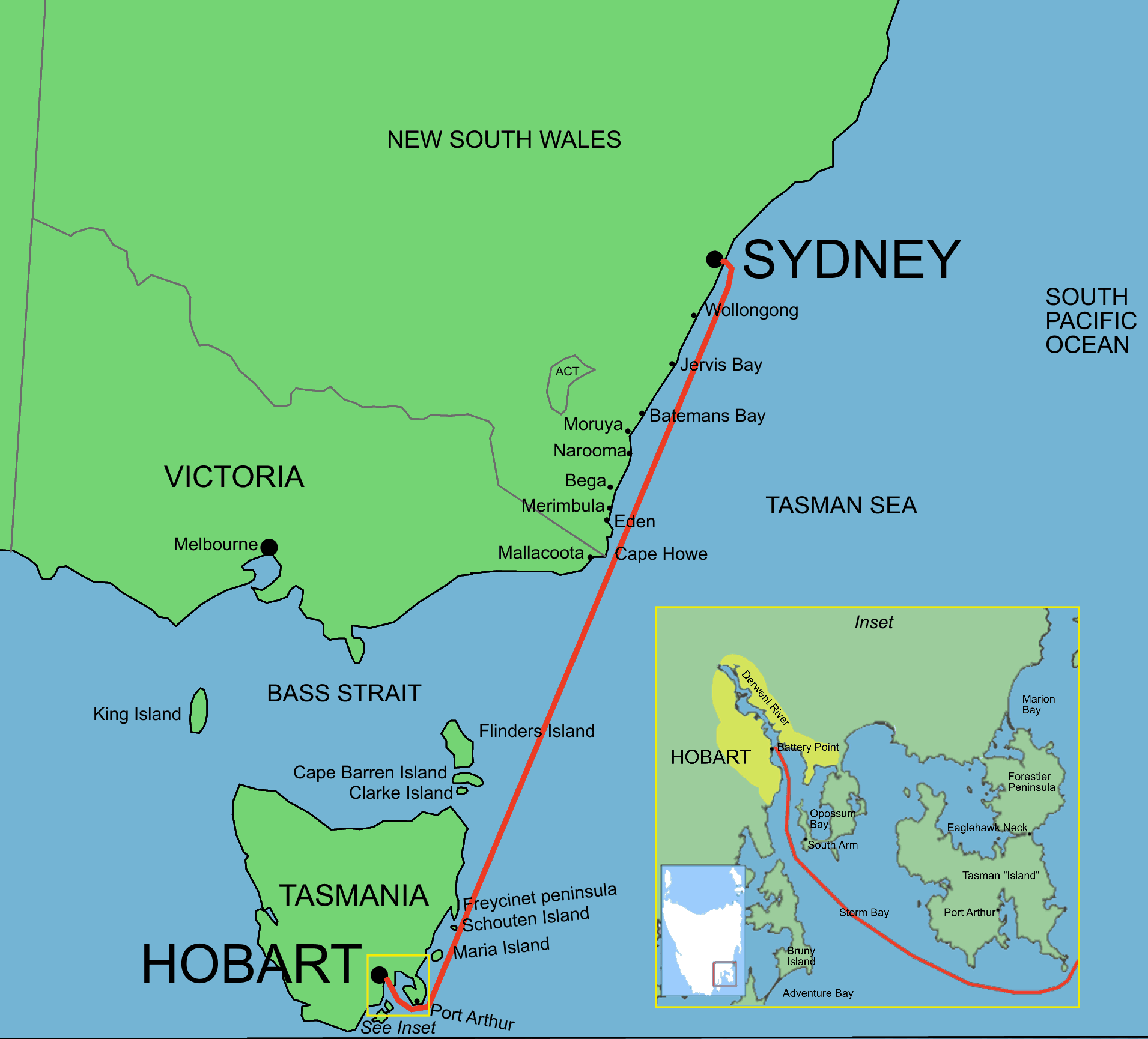
the route the Sydney to Hobart yacht race follows

Lee has competed in five races and finished the race three times. Lee competed in 1994, 1996, and 2013 with the Making Waves Foundation.

In 1994, he responded to an advertisement which was looking for disabled people to race in the annual Sydney to Hobart yacht race. The founder of the Making Waves Foundation - David Pescud - made Albert a promise that "you'll never regret this experience - it'll change your life".

Following this promise, despite not having any sailing experience, Lee was ready to take on the challenge and tough training required to prepare for the race. This training needed to prepare the crew for any dangerous events that could potentially occur during their 5-day voyage. The crew needed to work as a team, have a strong awareness of sea safety survival, and constantly maintain the vessel. At the annual race in 1994, Lee and his team were the first fully disabled crew to compete in an ocean race.

Lee competed in 1996; however, the team broke their boat's boom and the vessel had to be retired which led to an incomplete attempt.

In 2013, Lee raced on the 'Faceboat' which was skippered by Kirk Watson who was accompanied by his guide dog 'Tiller'. The 'Faceboat' was a 52-foot (16 m) ocean racer called 'Kayle' with sail number 7878. The vessel was a custom built yacht made specially to suit the needs of its disabled crew. The crew was made up of D Pescud (20) (navigator), G Johnstone (8), M Thomson (7), R Speedy (10), D Leslie (1), C Josling (10), B Allen (3), K Moore, A Lee (4), B Canham (6), D D'annunzio, G Kennedy, T Purkiss, G Donovan, and R Sealey.

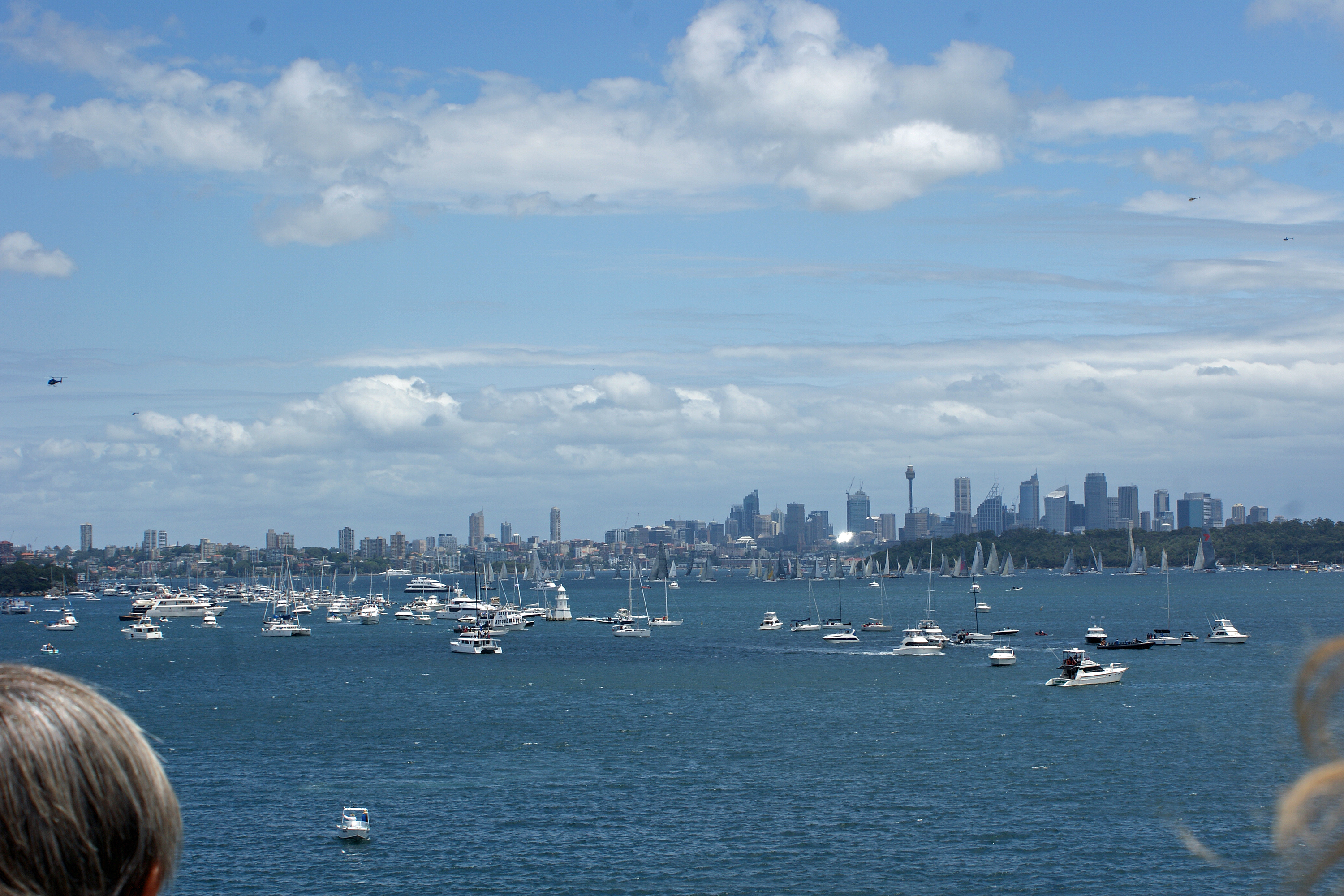
The start of the Sydney to Hobart yacht race

Four members of the crew had never competed in a race before their 2013 attempt. Lee described their journey by stating, "heading down the east coast of Tasmania was hard work. The wind was constantly blowing in our face. There were difficult conditions with unfavorable wind". Despite the crew's inexperience and the tough conditions, the crew completed the race and finished 31st out of 84 competitors with a time of 3 days, 18 hours, 28 minutes and 50 seconds. The 'Faceboat' was a fund raising project where donors could have a picture of their face on the boat for a $25 donation. These donors could have their image be one of 3800 snapshots that were placed on 'Kayle'.

==== World record ====
In 2003, Lee was part of the Making Waves Foundation team. This project team set two world records within the year. They achieved the world record for a non-stop, unassisted circumnavigation around Australia by a Monohull vessel, and the world record for doing this with a disabled crew. The seven person crew was made up of Lee (double amputee), Al Grundy (polio), Kim Jaggar (amputee), David Pescud (dyslexic), Phil Thompson (amputee), Harald Merlieb (hearing impaired), and Brett Pearce (spina bifida). It took skipper David Pescud, and his disabled crew 37 days and 1 hour to complete the sail.

=== Positive impact of sport ===
Lee sees sport as a form of rehabilitation and a way to meet different people. Sports and physical activity have been found to have a positive effect on the quality of life and self-esteem of people with limb amputations. It helps amputees make friends and expand their knowledge of the activity they are participating in. It has also been found that participation in such activities has helped amputees accept their disabilities and improve motor function. After Lee's first Sydney to Hobart yacht race in 1994, he said he had "for the first time in my life since my accident I felt free. I was out on the ocean with a crew who had disabilities second. We were sailors first." He also loves the team spirit and unity between the crew. Albert has said that he loves "sailing because it is a sport where disabled people can actually compete on equal terms".

== Education ==
Lee studied optometry at the University of New South Wales (UNSW) and is furthering his studies as a MPhil candidate researching refugee and people seeking asylum's access to eye care in NSW.

=== Appointments ===
From 2002 to 2007 and 2011 to 2013, Lee was an Optometry Australia (NSW/ACT) councilor.

From 2003 to 2004, he was a quality in practice surveyor.

In 2006, he was part of the Association of Health Professions NSW.

He was a member of the Optical Dispensers licensing board from 2004 to 2010 and the optical dispensers trust from 2010 to 2014.

Since 2012, he is a CASA accredited Optometrist and from 2015 to 2021 was a member of the Optometry council of NSW.

In 2017, he was a board member of Sailors with Disabilities (non-profit).

Lee is affiliated with and a member of Optometry Australia (NSW/ACT) and CCLSA.

He is a clinical supervisor in the UNSW Optometry clinic and is involved in the provision of eye care services to Justice Health, the Forensic Mental Health Network and the Villawood Detention Center.

== Philanthropy ==
Lee is involved in many philanthropic activities. His desire to help others stems from kindness the people around him showed him during his own tough times. He is grateful for what he has rather than what he does not have and does not let his disability restrict him. When it comes to providing others with support, Albert says "when we can, we need to look after the people that need help, we need to encourage them to stand on their own and be part of the solution".

=== Through optometry ===
He has been involved with the Brien Holden Foundation in providing indigenous eye care to remote Australian communities. The Brien Holden Foundation provides eye care services, education, and training initiatives with the aim of providing more people with sight. Lee has an interest in public health and enjoys giving back to the community. It has been found that there is a 13.1% (80% - 66.9%) lower frequency of eye examinations in Australia's indigenous population when compared to that of other Australian's. He has contributed as a clinical supervisor in the UNSW clinic. He has been on trips to Sri Lanka, Vanuatu, the Tiwi Islands, the Northern Territory and Nepal where he provided spectacle corrections to those affected by the natural disasters

=== Through sailing ===
Albert joined the Making Waves Foundation upon its inception in 1994. It is a non-profit organization which aims to use sailing to change people's opinions of disabled people. In 2013, Albert sailed "Faceboat" in the Sydney to Hobart yacht race. "Faceboat" was a campaign created to raise awareness for disabled people. The campaign ran for two months and had over 500 sponsors. One could become a sponsor by donating $25. This tax deductible donation entitled a picture of one's face to be placed on the boat as it raced.

The mosaic of 3800 images was unveiled on December 3, 2013 - on International Day of People with Disability. While Lee enjoys showing people how abled disabled people are, he also loves the team spirit and camaraderie that the Making Waves Foundation's team emulates. Albert says that when sailing with a crew with disabilities "there aren't as many egos" because everyone has had "to accept some disadvantages in life", despite these disadvantages, the crew knows what they are "capable of and appreciate what others have to contribute".

== Career ==
Lee is a registered optometrist and has an optometry practice at Shop 4, 2 King Street, Rockdale, NSW.
