= Junior Offshore Group =

- Burgee

- Ensign
- Short name: JOG
- Founded: December 7, 1950; 75 years ago

The Junior Offshore Group (JOG) is a UK based yacht club that organises offshore yacht races in the UK using IRC handicap system. The upper IRC limit for JOG is currently set at 1.200 and there is no lower limit as long as yachts comply with the relevant World Sailing Organisation Special Regulations category. Aimed at smaller yachts, though the size of the smallest yacht keeps getting bigger as the years go by.

In the UK racing is normally from the JOG startline off Cowes and races are Cross Channel (Cherbourg, St Vaast, Deauville, Alderney, Le Havre, St Peter Port etc. or inshore (Solent, Weymouth, Poole etc.).

JOG offers close competitive racing with assigned company both on and off the water. A large majority of the races end with a social event organised at the race destination to allow racers the chance to unwind and discuss their race stories.

JOG fleets and racing also exist in countries such as Australia, usually centered in the capital cities. Some State yachting authorities there have separate JOG sub-committees to organise events across a number of participating Clubs.

The JOG was founded 7 December 1950 at the Royal Ocean Racing Club. Its first President was the yacht designer John Illingworth.
