= Sydney to Hobart Yacht Race =

Annual yacht race from Sydney to Hobart

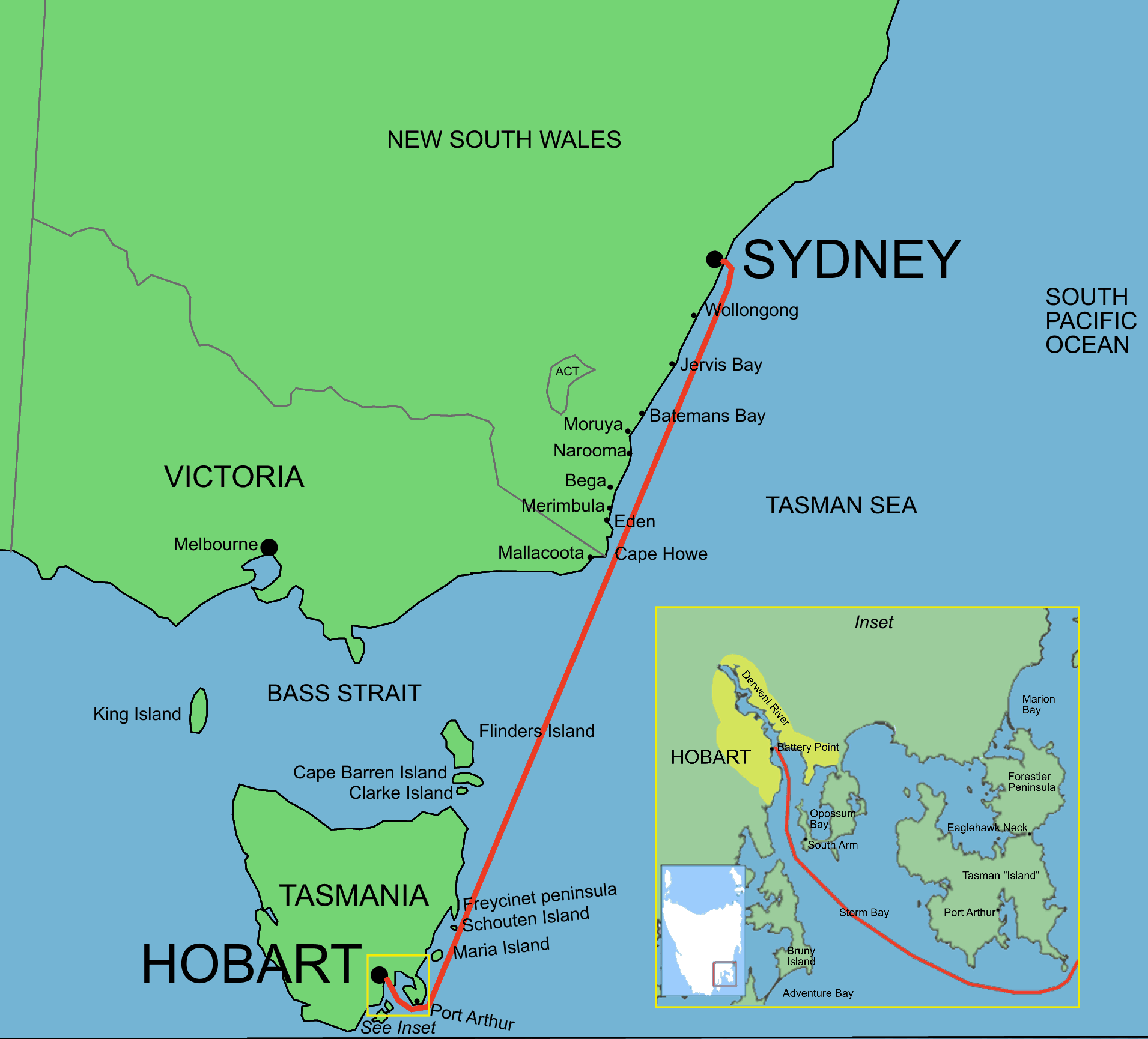
- Map of the Rolex Sydney Hobart Yacht Race route
- First held: 1945
- Start: Sydney, New South Wales, Australia
- Finish: Hobart, Tasmania, Australia
- Competitors: 103 (2023)
- Champion: Alive (on handicap); LawConnect (Line Honours)
- Most titles: Freya; Love & War; "Ichi Ban" (3) (on handicap); Wild Oats XI (9) (line honours)
- TV partner(s): Nine Network
- Website: rolexsydneyhobart.com

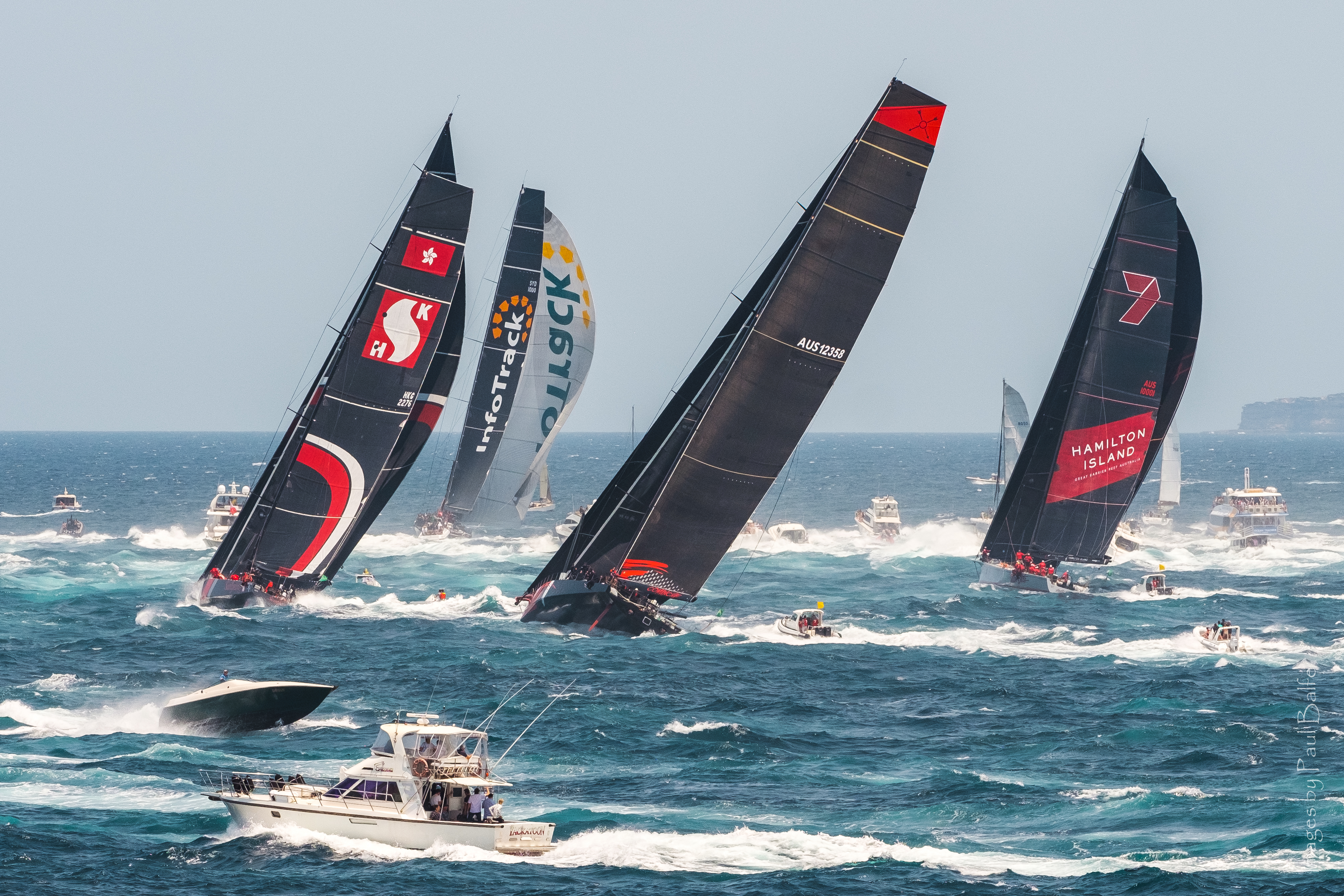
InfoTrack leads the fleet through Sydney Heads and south to Hobart in ideal, if smoky conditions at the start of the 75th Sydney to Hobart Yacht Race in 2019

The Sydney Hobart Yacht Race is an annual oceanic yacht racing event hosted by the Cruising Yacht Club of Australia, starting in Sydney, New South Wales, on Boxing Day and finishing in Hobart, Tasmania. The race distance is approximately 630 nautical miles (1,170 km). The race is run in conjunction with the Royal Yacht Club of Tasmania, and is widely considered to be one of the most difficult yacht races in the world.

The race was initially planned to be a cruise by Peter Luke and some friends who had formed a club for those who enjoyed cruising as opposed to racing; however, when a visiting British Royal Navy Officer, Captain John Illingworth, suggested it be made a race, the event was born. Since the inaugural race in 1945, the Sydney to Hobart Yacht Race has grown over the decades to become one of the top three offshore yacht races in the world, and it now attracts maxi yachts from all around the globe. The 2025 race was the 80th edition.

Australia's foremost offshore sailing prize is The George Adams Tattersall Cup, awarded to the ultimate winner of the handicap competition based on the length, shape, weight and sail dimensions of the yacht. Much public attention however, focuses on the race for "line honours" – the first boat across the finishing line, typically the newest and largest Maxi yacht in the fleet.

Along with the Newport-Bermuda Race and the Fastnet Race, it is considered one of the classic big offshore races with each distance approximately 625 nautical miles (719 mi; 1,158 km).

In 2017, LDV Comanche set a new race record finishing in 1 day, 9 hours, 15 minutes and 24 seconds, beating Perpetual Loyal's record of 1 day, 13 hours, 31 minutes and 20 seconds, set the previous year. Wild Oats XI, who crossed the line first, received a 1-hour penalty for her role in a near-miss collision at the beginning of the race and disregard of the starboard rule, handing LDV Comanche line honours. Wild Oats XI completed the course in an unofficial record time of 1 day, 08 hours, 48 minutes and 50 seconds.

Wild Oats XI has won line honours on 9 separate occasions (2005–2008, 2010, 2012–2014, 2018) and is the first boat to have claimed the treble – race record, line honours and overall winner.

== History ==
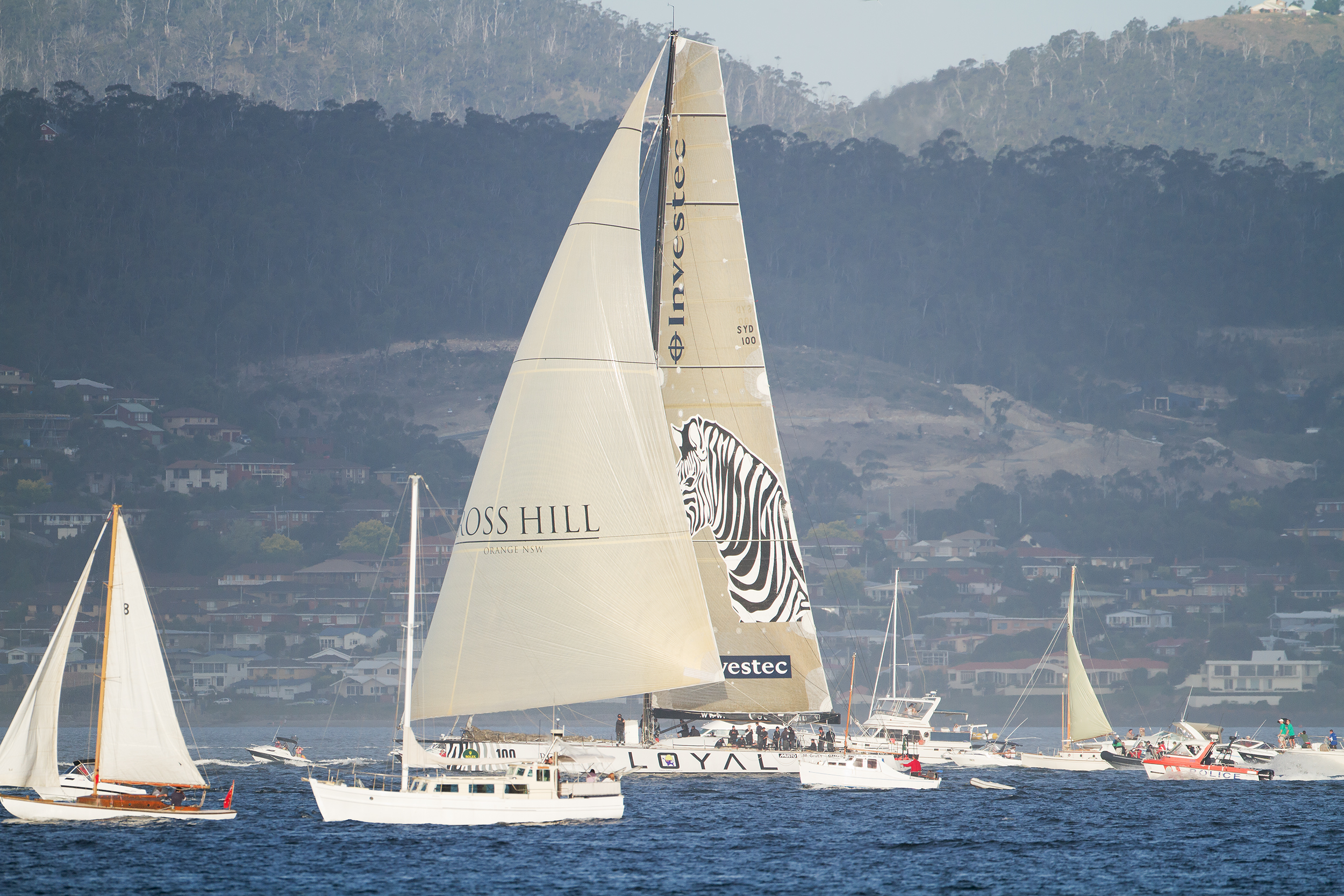
Investec Loyal about to win the 2011 Sydney to Hobart Yacht Race

The Bass Strait, and the waters of the Pacific Ocean immediately to its east are renowned for their high winds and difficult seas. Although the race mostly takes place in the Tasman Sea, the shallowness of Bass Strait and the proximity to the race course means that the fleet is very much under the influence of the Strait as they transit from the mainland to Flinders Island. Even though the race is held in the Australian summer, southerly buster storms often make the Sydney–Hobart race cold, bumpy, and very challenging for the crew. It is typical for a considerable number of yachts to retire, often at Eden on the New South Wales south coast, the last sheltered harbour before Flinders Island.

The first Sydney to Hobart race was held in 1945. The race was initially planned to be a cruise by Peter Luke and some friends who had formed a club for those who enjoyed cruising as opposed to racing; however, when a visiting British Royal Navy Officer, Captain John Illingworth, suggested it be made a race, the event was born. The inaugural race had nine starters, including the Kathleen Gillett, captained by renowned marine artist Jack Earl. John Illingworth's Rani, built at Speers Point was the winner, taking six days, 14 hours and 22 minutes. Race records for the fastest (elapsed) time dropped rapidly. However, it took 21 years for the 1975 record by Kialoa from the United States to be broken by the German yacht Morning Glory in 1996, and then only by a dramatic 29 minutes, as she tacked up the River Derwent against the clock. In 1999 Denmark's Nokia sailed the course in one day, 19 hours, 48 minutes and two seconds, a record which stood until 2005 when Wild Oats XI won line and handicap honours in 1 day 18 hr 40 min 10 sec.

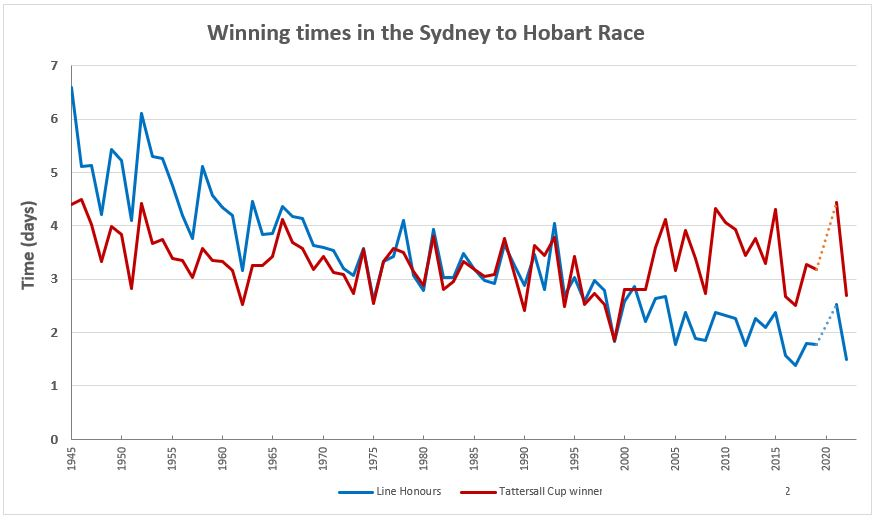
Winning times from 1945

There have been some notable achievements by yachts over the years. Sydney yacht, Morna, won the second, third and fourth races (1946–1948) and then, under new owners Frank and John Livingston from Victoria, took a further four titles as Kurrewa IV in 1954, 1956, 1957 and 1960. Other yachts to win three or more titles are Astor (1961, 1963 and 1964) and Bumblebee IV firstly in 1979 and then again in 1988 and 1990 as Ragamuffin. When Wild Oats XI won back-to-back titles in 2006, it was the first yacht to do so since Astor in the 1960s. Wild Oats XI claimed its third consecutive line honours title in the 2007 race, re-writing history by being only the second yacht after Rani in the inaugural 1945 race to win line and handicap honours and break the race record in the same year (2005) and then only the second yacht after Morna to win three line honours titles in a row. In 2008, Wild Oats XI broke Morna's long-standing record of three titles in a row, by completing a four-in-a-row, the first yacht to achieve that remarkable achievement. For the handicap race the highly respected Halvorsen brothers' Freya won three titles back-to-back (the only yacht in history to do so) between 1963 and 1965. Although not consecutive, Love & War equalled Freya's three titles by winning its third in 2006 to add to its 1974 and 1978 titles.

In the 1994 Sydney to Hobart Yacht Race, the making waves foundation's crew were the first fully disabled team to compete in an ocean race and Australian Paralympic sitting volleyball player Albert Lee was a part of this team.

The 1998 Sydney to Hobart Yacht Race was marred by tragedy when, during an exceptionally strong storm (which had similar strength winds to a lower-category hurricane), five boats sank and six people died. Of the 115 boats that started, only 44 made it to Hobart. As a result, the crew eligibility rules were tightened, requiring a higher minimum age and experience. G. Bruce Knecht wrote a book about this race, The Proving Ground. A coronial enquiry into the race was critical of both the race management at the time and the Bureau of Meteorology.

In 1999 the race record was broken by Nokia, a water-ballasted Volvo Ocean 60 (VO60) yacht. She sailed the course in 1 day, 19 hours, 48 minutes and 2 seconds. Brindabella reached Hobart just under one hour later (1 day, 20 hours, 46 minutes, 33 seconds) and Wild Thing was a close third (1 day, 21 hours, 13 minutes, 37 seconds). The previous Sydney to Hobart Yacht Race record had been set by Morning Glory (2 days, 14 hours, 7 minutes, 10 seconds) in 1996.

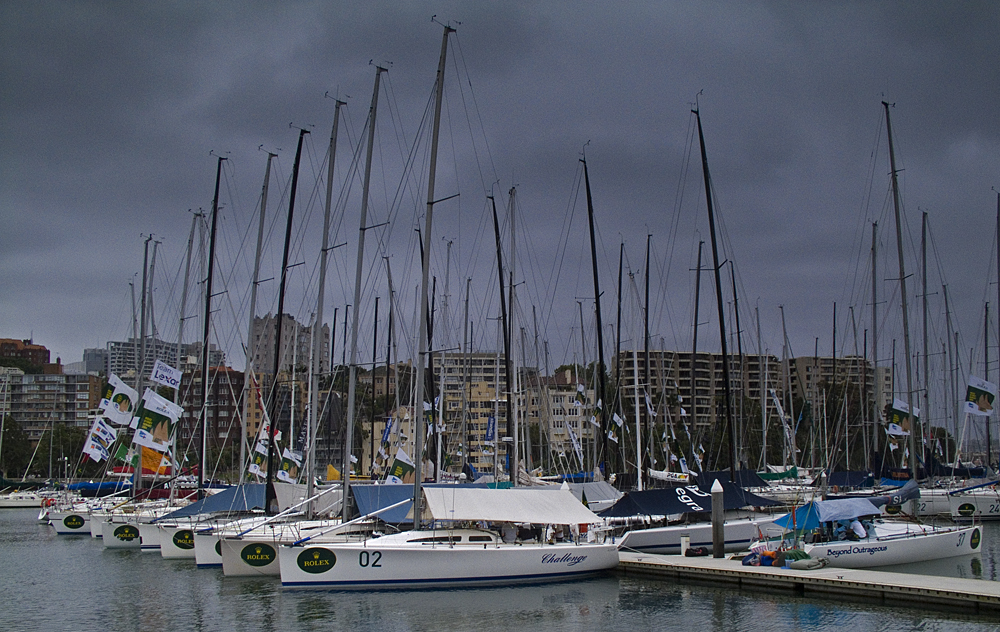
Sydney to Hobart entrants moored up at Rushcutters Bay, 25 December 2004

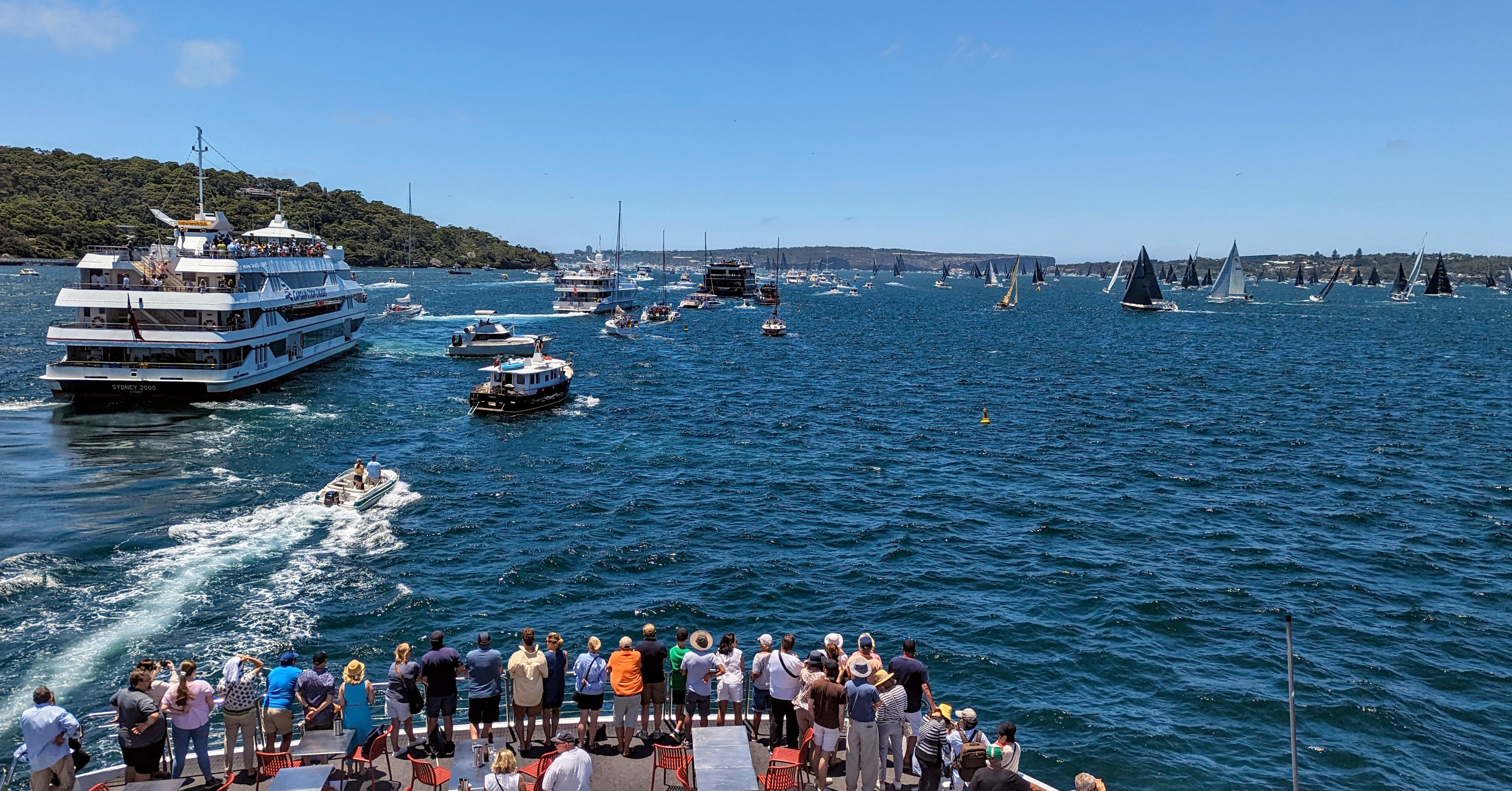
Spectators in Sydney Harbour at the 2022 race

In 2004 only 59 yachts completed the course of the 116 who set out from Sydney. Storms hit the race. The super maxi Skandia capsized after losing her keel. In 2005, Wild Oats XI became the first boat since Rani to win the "treble", taking Line Honours, winning the Corrected Handicap (IRC), and breaking the course record. (1d 18h 40 m 10s, over 1hr off of Nokia's record.)

In 1982 Condor of Burmuda won the Sydney to Hobart (1981) which was the closest ever finish, winning by just seven seconds against Apollo III during a gruelling match race up the River Derwent.

In 2006, 78 boats started the race, including entrants from the United Kingdom, Canada, the Netherlands, Italy, New Zealand, every Australian state and the Australian Capital Territory. The race started on schedule at 13:00 Australian Eastern Daylight Saving Time. Wild Oats XI, owned by Bob Oatley and skippered by Mark Richards, crossed the finish line at 21:52 on 28 December 2006 to take line honours with an elapsed time of 2 days, 8 hours, 52 minutes and 33 seconds. Wild Oats XI became the first yacht to win the race in consecutive years since 1964 and only the sixth yacht to achieve this since the race's inception. Love & War, owned by Peter Kurts and skippered by Lindsay May, won the race overall (IRC Handicap) in a corrected time of 3 days, 22 hours 2 minutes and 37 seconds. Love & War became only the second yacht to win the race three times (1974, 1978 and 2006). The yacht Freya won the race in three consecutive years between 1963 and 1965. Gillawa from the Australian Capital Territory, skippered by David Kent, was the sixty-ninth and last boat to complete the 2006 race, making it the third consecutive year that the yacht was last in the fleet.

The longest surviving skipper from the inaugural race, Peter Luke, who contributed to the formation of the Cruising Yacht Club of Australia and the establishment of the Sydney to Hobart Yacht Race, died on 23 September 2007 aged 92. His yacht, Wayfarer, still holds the record for the slowest elapsed time. One of two surviving sailors from the original race – Geoffrey Ruggles from the Wayfarer crew, died in July 2019, leaving John Gordon from the Horizon crew.

By the November 2007 race entry deadline, 90 yachts had nominated for entry including four 90-foot maxis, three of them wanting to prevent Wild Oats XI creating history and winning three line honours titles in a row. A little over a week prior to the race, New Zealand maxi Maximus withdrew after cracking its keel. Three-time and 2006 handicap winner, Love & War, was not one of the applications for entry and may have raced her last Sydney to Hobart Yacht Race in 2006. Wild Oats XI went on to create history by winning its third consecutive line honours title and becoming only the second yacht to do so. Rosebud (USA) won the race on corrected time. John Walker became the oldest skipper in the history of the race at age 85, and Phillip's Foote Witchdoctor bettered its own record and set a mark of 27 races as the most by a yacht.

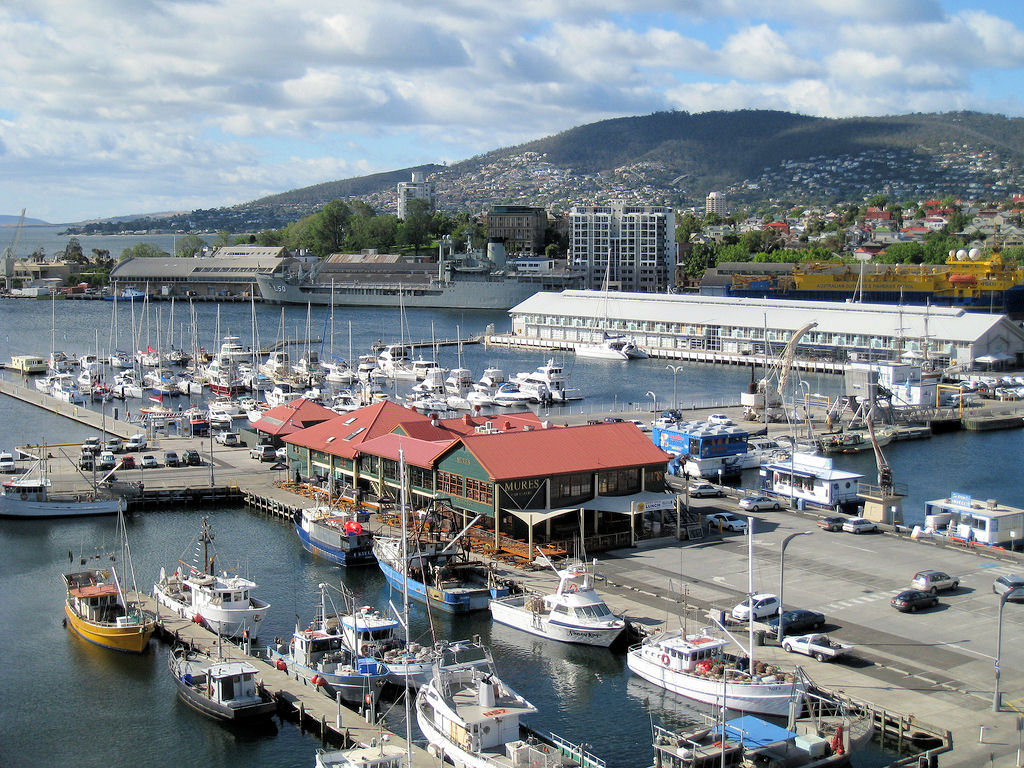
Hobart's Constitution Dock is the arrival point for the fleet after they have completed the race, and usually witnesses scenes of celebration by many yachtsmen during the new year festivities.

On 3 November 2008 at the close of entries, 113 yachts had nominated for entry with only one other 90-foot maxi (Skandia) to challenge Wild Oats XI and stop it creating history by winning four consecutive line honours titles and becoming the only yacht to do so. Wild Oats XI achieved this and Bob Steel won his second Tattersall Cup with Quest, the second yacht with the same name to win the handicap title.

The 2009 fleet comprised 99 starters. In the 2008 race, Wild Oats XI had equalled Morna/Kurrewa IV's record of three consecutive line honours victories, which Morna achieved in 1946, 1947 and 1948, and was attempting to pass the record in its own right in 2009.

In the event however, Neville Crichton's New Zealand entry Alpha Romeo II passed Wild Oats XI early on and never relinquished her lead, finishing in an elapsed time of 2 days, 9 hours, 2 minutes and 10 seconds. Wild Oats XI came in second and United Kingdom-based ICAP Leopard came in third.

Sailors who have achieved outstanding commitment to the race are represented most of all by John Bennetto (dec), Lou Abrahams and Tony Cable who, after the 2007 race, had each sailed 44 races. Skippers Frank and John Livingston won four line honours titles while Claude Plowman, Peter Warner, S.A "Huey" Long, Jim Kilroy and Bob Bell have each won three. Trygve and Magnus Halvorsen have won four handicap honours titles while a number of skippers have won two handicap titles.

Rolex has been the naming rights sponsor of the race since 2002, and since then the race has been known as the Rolex Sydney to Hobart Yacht Race. Traditionally, crews of yachts celebrate on New Year's Eve at Constitution Dock in Hobart, with the Customs House Hotel a favourite venue for Sydney–Hobart yachtsmen.

The 2020 race was cancelled due to an outbreak of COVID-19 in Sydney's north. The Cruising Yacht Club said it was "unrealistic" to proceed with the race after the Tasmanian government declared Greater Sydney a "medium-risk" zone, requiring all participants to quarantine for 14 days on arrival in Tasmania. It was the first time the race was not conducted in its 76-year history.

2020 saw the introduction of a two-handed division (only two crew members permitted) with its own trophy, the Two-Handed IRC Trophy. Due to the race being cancelled in 2020, the first two-handed entrants competed in the 2021 race.

The death of two sailors in separate incidents during the 2024 race (the first deaths since 1998) has led some to argue for a review of the race's safety protocols.

Min River won the 2025 race on corrected time. It was the first two-handed yacht to win, and the first winning yacht to have a woman skipper, Chinese-Australian owner Jiang Lin (it also had a male skipper, Frenchman Alexis Loison.)

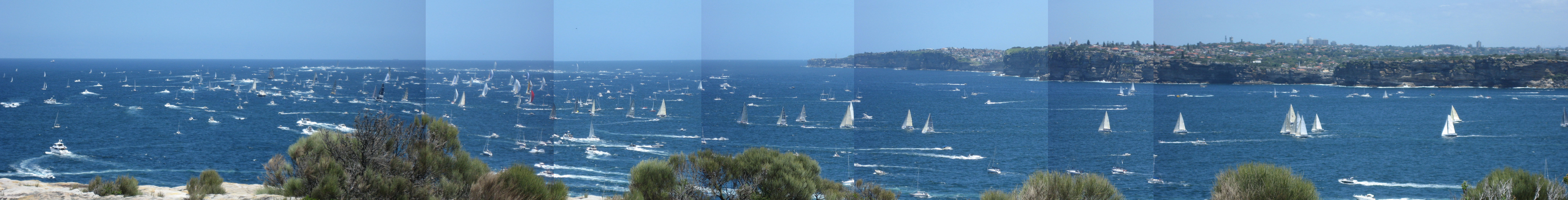
Panorama of the 2007 Sydney–Hobart Yacht Race.

== "Holy Grail" ==
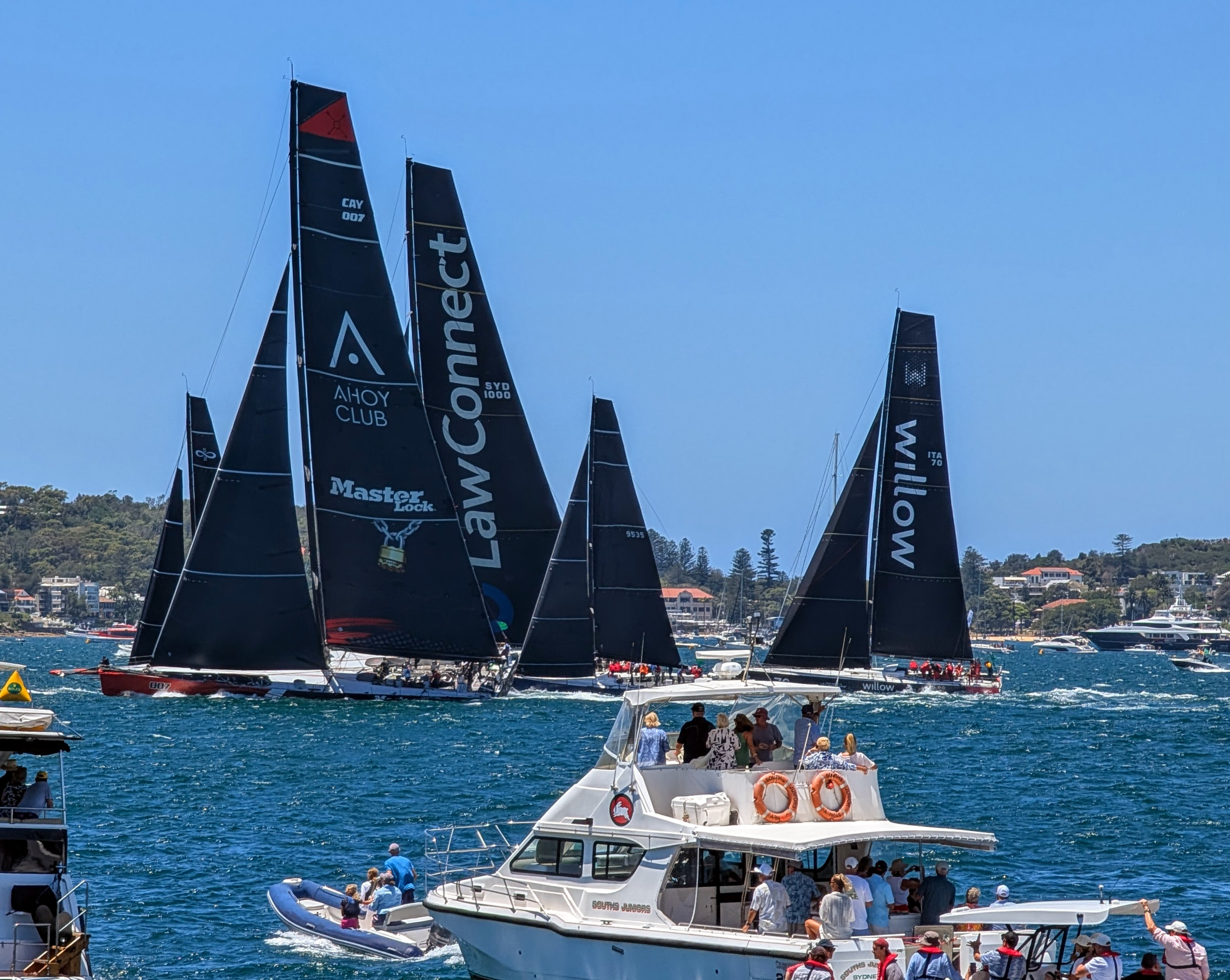
Comanche and LawConnect at the starting gun of the 2024 race

With the smashing of the Sydney–Hobart Race record in 1999 by Nokia—and a host of other super-fast boats that completed the course in less than two days for the first time—the "Holy Grail" of the Sydney–Hobart race, a completion of the course in a time under the 40-hour mark, became a possibility. Many of the skippers competing in the Sydney–Hobart race in the 21st century have expressed a desire to be the first to record a time under the once thought of as impossible mark of 40 hours. In 2017, this goal was met when the race record was set by LDV Comanche to 33 hours, 15 minutes and 24 seconds.

Comanche won again in 2019 and 2022 without breaking the 40-hour mark. In 2024, she was in the lead but retired when the mast broke. LawConnect took line honours with a time of 37 hours, 35 minutes, 13 seconds, breaking the 40-hour mark but not breaking Comanche's record.

== Women's involvement ==
Women first participated in the race in 1946. The first woman to take part was Jane Tate, whose boat Active was the only one to reach Hobart in 1946. Dagmar O'Brien, with boat Connella, also took part in that year but retired from the race before finishing. Thus, the Jane Tate Memorial Trophy is awarded each year to the first female skipper to complete the race.

In 1975, the first all-women crew sailed was the boat Barbarian, skippered by Vicki Willman of the Middle Harbour Yacht Club.

In 1996, Kathy Collingridge crewed on One Time Sidewinder. She was the first Indigenous woman to take part in the race.

Since then up to 2021, there have been another 12. The following is the list of all female crews to compete:

| No. | Year | Boat | Other name | Club | Sail no. | Skipper | Navigator |
|---|---|---|---|---|---|---|---|
| 1 | 1975 | Barbarian | Barbarian | MHYC | MH260 | Vicki Willman | Sheila Beach |
| 2 | 1989 | Belles Long Ranger | Otaga | CYCA | 1170 | Christine Evans (WoW) | Beth Higgs (2) |
| 3 | 1992 | Ella Bache | Beyond Thunderdome | MHYC | 5500 | Adrienne Cahalan (2) | |
| 3 | 1992 | Nadia IV | Nadia IV | RSYS | 4040 | Kerry Goudge (4) (WoW) | |
| 5 | 1993 | Telecom MobileNet | Nadia IV | CYCA | 4040 | Kerry Goudge (5) (WoW) | |
| 6 | 1994 | Telecom MobileNet | Nadia IV | CYCA | 4040 | Kerry Goudge (6) (WoW) | |
| 6 | 1994 | Brightstone, NZL | | RNZYS | NZL 83 | Teresa Borrell | |
| 6 | 1994 | Qantas NZ | Outward Bound | BBYC | NZL 4525 | Gayle Melrose (2) | |
| 9 | 1995 | WOW Nortel | Nadia IV | CYCA | 4040 | Kerry Goudge (7) (WoW) | |
| 10 | 1995 | Mortgage Choice | Cape Fear | CYCA | 5406 | Amanda Wilmot (7) | |
| 11 | 2001 | Amer Sports Too | | Costa Smeralda | | Lisa McDonald (USA/GBR) | Genevieve White (AUS) |
| 12 | 2017 | Climate Action Now | | CYCA | N11 | Lisa Blair | Libby Greenhalgh |
| 13 | 2018 | Wild Oats X | | HIYC | 7001 | Stacey Jackson (11) | Elizabeth Greenhalgh (1) |

In 2005, 24 women took part, including Adrienne Cahalan, who is famed for her around-the-world sailing, has been nominated several times for World Yachtswoman of the Year and was Australian Yachtswoman of the Year for 2004–05. In 2005 she was part of the crew for the winning Wild Oats.

In 2011, Jessica Watson, known for her solo unassisted sail around the world at age 16, skippered the Sydney Hobart yacht race with a crew of six other young Australians and three Britons all aged 21 or under, making them some of the youngest ever to compete in the blue water classic.

In 2018, skippered by Stacey Jackson, Ocean Respect Racing (on Wild Oats X) became the first fully professional all women's crew to compete in the Sydney Hobart.

In 2022, Kathy Veel and Bridget Canham, whom had met on Kerry Goudge's Nadia IV in 1993, raced Currawong to the finish line, becoming the first all women's crew to complete the race in the Two-Handed division.

Min River won the 2025 race on corrected time; it was the first winning yacht to have a woman skipper, Chinese-Australian owner Jiang Lin (it also had a male skipper, Frenchman Alexis Loison.)

In total, over a thousand women have taken part in the race.

== Rules ==
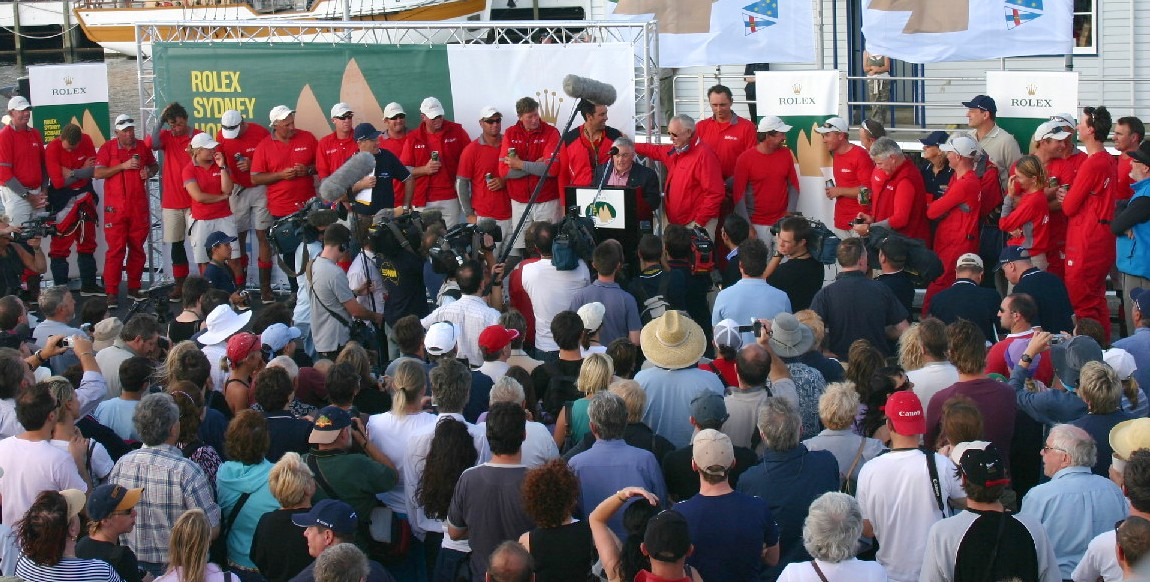
The crew of 2005 winner Wild Oats XI.

The exact rules for the Tattersall Cup have changed over the years. In general, each boat's time is adjusted on the expected speed of the boat based on its size and other characteristics. The International Offshore Rules were superseded by the International Measurement System (IMS), and the IRC. For 1991, 1992 & 1993 races, the winners of the IOR and IMS categories were both declared Overall winners during the transition from IOR to IMS. However, the Tattersall Cup was awarded only to the Overall IOR winner during this period. Since 1994 there has been only one Overall winner, from 1994 to 2003 being decided using IMS, but from the 2004 onwards the Overall winner of the Tattersall Cup has been decided using IRC, with IMS dropped altogether as a handicap system. In theory, this should make for an even competition between yachts of all sizes, however in practice often only the newest and most advanced boats (regardless of size) can sail fast relative to their rating. In addition, in a race of the length of the Sydney–Hobart weather conditions after the maxi yachts have finished can often determine whether they will win on handicap – if the winds become more favourable after they finish, they will lose on handicap, if they become less favourable they will win.

The race is conducted under the Racing Rules of Sailing determined and published by the International Sailing Federation. For the 2005 race, the event organisers removed certain restrictions on the boats. As successful sailing is based on a good power-to-weight ratio, larger sails are expected to help break race records.

== Two-handed division ==
2020 saw the introduction of a two-handed division (only two crew members permitted) with its own trophy, the Two-Handed IRC Trophy.

Due to the race being cancelled in 2020, the first two-handed entrants competed in the 2021 race, which attracted 18 entrants. Two-handed yachts were not included in the Tattersall Cup because organisers could not establish an equitable handicap due to two-handed yachts’ use of autopilots.

In 2021 rough conditions meant that just seven two handers made it through the first night, with the others retiring at port. The first two-handed category was won by Disko Trooper-Contender Sailcloth, a J/99.

In 2022, two-handed yachts were allowed to contend for the Tattersall Cup. There were 22 entries making it the fastest growing section of the race. The 2022 2-handed IRC was won by 'Mistral', a Lombard 34. 'Mistral' finished 29th in the Tattersall Cup. By 2023, two-handed entries comprised 17.5% of the total fleet.

Min River won the 2025 race on corrected time. It was the first two-handed yacht to win the entire race, as well as the first winning yacht to have a woman skipper, Chinese-Australian owner Jiang Lin (it also had a male skipper, Frenchman Alexis Loison.)

== Yachts ==
The fleet comprises mostly sloops; that is, yachts with a single mast on which is hoisted a fore-and-aft rigged mainsail and a single jib or Genoa, plus extras such as a spinnaker.

The race has encouraged innovation in yacht design. Between 1945 and 2005, the most successful yacht designer has been the New Zealand designer Bruce Farr, who has designed 15 overall winners.

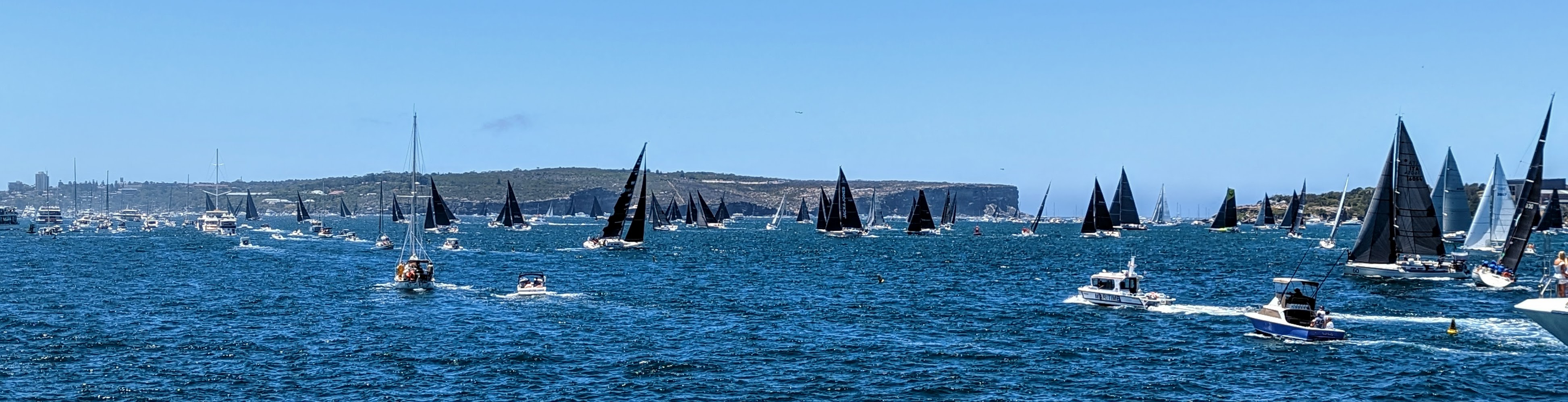
77th (2022) Rolex Sydney Hobart Yacht Race at 16 minutes after the start

== Winners and fleet sizes ==
| Year | Line honours | Elapsed time d/hh:mm:ss | Handicap winner | Corrected time d/hh:mm:ss | fleet size at start | at finish |
|---|---|---|---|---|---|---|
| 1945 | (United Kingdom) Rani | **6/14:22** | (United Kingdom) Rani | **4/09:38** | 9 | 8 |
| 1946 | (New South Wales) Morna | **5/02:53:33** | (New South Wales) Christina | 4/11:53:27 | 19 | 11 |
| 1947 | (New South Wales) Morna | 5/03:03:54 | (Tasmania) Westward | 4/00:24:56 | 28 | 21 |
| 1948 | (New South Wales) Morna | **4/05:01:21** | (Tasmania) Westward | 3/07:45:48 | 18 | 13 |
| 1949 | (New South Wales) Waltzing Matilda | 5/10:33:10 | (New South Wales) Trade Winds | 3/23:39:43 | 15 | 13 |
| 1950 | (New South Wales) Margaret Rintoul | 5/05:28:35 | (South Australia) Nerida | 3/20:17:13 | 16 | 14 |
| 1951 | (New South Wales) Margaret Rintoul | **4/02:29:01** | (New South Wales) Struen Marie | 2/19:48:26 | 14 | 12 |
| 1952 | (New South Wales) Nocturne | 6/02:34:47 | (South Australia) Ingrid | 4/09:56:18 | 17 | 17 |
| 1953 | (New South Wales) Solveig IV | 5/07:12:50 | (New South Wales) Ripple | 3/16:12:12 | 24 | 20 |
| 1954 | (Victoria (state)) Kurrewa IV (formerly Morna) | 5:06:09:47 | (New South Wales) Solveig IV | 3/17:58:01 | 17 | 15 |
| 1955 | (New South Wales) Even | 4/18:13:14 | (New South Wales) Moonbi | 3/09:21:05 | 17 | 16 |
| 1956 | (Victoria (state)) Kurrewa IV (formerly Morna) | 4:04:31:44 | (New South Wales) Solo | 3/08:33:52 | 28 | 26 |
| 1957 | (Victoria (state)) Kurrewa IV (formerly Morna) | **3:18:30:39** | (New South Wales) Anitra V | 3/00:55:37 | 20 | 18 |
| 1958 | (New South Wales) Solo | 5/02:32:52 | (New South Wales) Siandra | 3/13:46:35 | 22 | 19 |
| 1959 | (New South Wales) Solo | 4/13:33:12 | (New South Wales) Cherana | 3/08:33:02 | 30 | 24 |
| 1960 | (Victoria (state)) Kurrewa IV (formerly Morna) | 4:08:11:15 | (New South Wales) Siandra | 3/07:48:04 | 32 | 30 |
| 1961 | (New South Wales) Astor | 4/04:42:11 | (New South Wales) Rival | 3/03:57:31 | 35 | 33 |
| 1962 | (United States) Ondine | **3/03:49:16** | (New South Wales) Solo | 2/12:45:14 | 42 | 40 |
| 1963 | (New South Wales) Astor | 4/10:53:00 | (New South Wales) Freya | 3/06:03:17 | 44 | 34 |
| 1964 | (New South Wales) Astor | 3/20:05:05 | (New South Wales) Freya | 3/05:58:14 | 38 | 31 |
| 1965 | (Netherlands) Stormvogel | 3/20:30:09 | (New South Wales) Freya | 3/10:03:26 | 53 | 49 |
| 1966 | (New Zealand) Fidelis | 4/08:39:43 | (New South Wales) Cadence | 4/02:46:24 | 46 | 44 |
| 1967 | (France) Pen Duick III | 4/04:10:31 | (New Zealand) Rainbow II | 3/16:39:15 | 66 | 59 |
| 1968 | (United States) Ondine II | 4/03:20:02 | (New South Wales) Koomooloo | 3/13:38:52 | 67 | 54 |
| 1969 | (United Kingdom) Crusade | 3/15:07:40 | (United Kingdom) Morning Cloud | 3/04:25:57 | 79 | 75 |
| 1970 | (New Zealand) Buccaneer | 3/14:06:12 | (New South Wales) Pacha | 3/10:07:39 | 61 | 47 |
| 1971 | (United States) Kialoa II | 3/12:46:21 | (New Zealand) PathFinder | 3/03:14:34 | 79 | 76 |
| 1972 | (United States) American Eagle | 3/04:42:39 | (United States) American Eagle | 3/02:15:59 | 79 | 75 |
| 1973 | (New South Wales) Helsal | **3/01:32:09** | (Hong Kong) Ceil III | 2/17:28:28 | 92 | 92 |
| 1974 | (United States) Ondine III | 3/13:51:56 | (New South Wales) Love & War | 3/13:25:02 | 63 | 58 |
| 1975 | (United States) Kialoa III | **2/14:36:56** | (Western Australia) Rampage | 2/13:16:56 | 102 | 99 |
| 1976 | (New South Wales) Ballyhoo | 3/07:59:26 | (New South Wales) Piccolo | 3/07:45:07 | 85 | 70 |
| 1977 | (United States) Kialoa III | 3/10:14:09 | (United States) Kialoa III | 3/13:58:10 | 131 | 72 |
| 1978 | (New South Wales) Apollo | 4/02:23:24 | (New South Wales) Love & War | 3/12:13:00 | 97 | 87 |
| 1979 | (New South Wales) Bumblebee IV | 3/01:45:52 | (Tasmania) Screw Loose | 3/03:31:06 | 147 | 142 |
| 1980 | New Zealand | 2/18:45:41 | New Zealand | 2/21:13:29 | 102 | 93 |
| 1981 | (New South Wales) Vengeance | 3/22:30:00 | (New South Wales) Zeus II | 3/19:25:59 | 159 | 144 |
| 1982 | Condor of Bermuda | 3/00:59:17 | (New South Wales) Scallywag | 2/19:19:16 | 118 | 108 |
| 1983 | (Bermuda) Condor | 3/00:50:29 | (Victoria (state)) Challenge II | 2/23:07:42 | 173 | 158 |
| 1984 | New Zealand | 3/11:31:21 | (New South Wales) Indian Pacific | 3/07:45:03 | 151 | 46 |
| 1985 | (New South Wales) Apollo | 3/04:32:28 | (New South Wales) Sagacious | 3/04:34:37 | 179 | 146 |
| 1986 | (Bermuda) Condor | 2/23:26:25 | (New South Wales) Ex Tension | 3/01:14:30 | 123 | 106 |
| 1987 | (New South Wales) Sovereign | 2/21:58:08 | (New South Wales) Sovereign | 3/01:58:41 | 154 | 146 |
| 1988 | (New South Wales) Ragamuffin (formerly Bumblebee IV) | 3/15:29:27 | (Victoria (state)) Illusion | 3/18:20:35 | 119 | 81 |
| 1989 | (Western Australia) Drumbeat | 3/06:21:34 | (Victoria (state)) Challenge II | 3/02:18:45 | 126 | 101 |
| 1990 | (New South Wales) Ragamuffin (formerly Bumblebee IV) | 2/21:05:33 | (New South Wales) Sagacious V | 2/19:44:32 | 105 | 86 |
| 1991 | (Australian Capital Territory) Brindabella | 3/11:14:09 | (New South Wales) She's Apples (IMS) (Republic of Ireland) Atara (IOR) | 3/15:19:20; 2:20:05:11 | 99 | 91 |
| 1992 | New Zealand Endeavour | 2/19:19:18 | (New South Wales) Assassin (IMS) (New South Wales) Ragamuffin (IOR) | 3/10:50:11; 2:21:21:04 | 110 | 102 |
| 1993 | (New South Wales) Ninety Seven | 4/00:54:11 | (New South Wales) Micropay Cuckoos Nest (IMS) (New South Wales) Solbourne Wild Oats (IOR) | 3/18:45:10; 3:20:36:30 | 104 | 38 |
| 1994 | Tasmania (formerly New Zealand Endeavour) | 2/16:48:04 | (Germany) Raptor (IMS) | 2/11:41:00 | 371 | 309 |
| 1995 | (United States) Sayonara | 3/00:53:35 | (Victoria (state)) Terra Firma | 3/10:22:36 | 98 | 92 |
| 1996 | (Germany) Morning Glory | **2/14:07:10** | (Victoria (state)) Ausmaid | 2/12:35:59 | 95 | 77 |
| 1997 | (Australian Capital Territory) Brindabella | 2/23:37:12 | (Hong Kong) Beau Geste | 2/17:21:27 | 114 | 99 |
| 1998 | (United States) Sayonara | 2/19:03:32 | (New South Wales) AFR Midnight Rambler | 2/12:36:23 | 115 | 44 |
| 1999 | (Denmark) Nokia | **1/19:48:02** | (New South Wales) Yendys | 1/20:32:53 | 79 | 49 |
| 2000 | (Sweden) Nicorette II | 2/14:02:09 | (South Australia) SAP Ausmaid (formerly Ausmaid) | 2/19:13:38 | 82 | 58 |
| 2001 | (Sweden) Assa Abloy | 2/20:46:43 | (New South Wales) Bumblebee V | 2/19:13:38 | 75 | 57 |
| 2002 | (New Zealand) Alfa Romeo I | 2/04:58:52 | (New South Wales) Quest | 2/19:13:38 | 57 | 55 |
| 2003 | (Victoria (state)) Skandia | 2/15:14:06 | (New South Wales) First National Real Estate | 3/14:14:17 | 56 | 52 |
| 2004 | (New South Wales) Nicorette III | 2/16:00:44 | (United Kingdom) Aera (IRC) | 4/02:52:09 | 116 | 59 |
| 2005 | (New South Wales) Wild Oats XI | **1/18:40:10** | (New South Wales) Wild Oats XI | 3/03:54:32 | 85 | 80 |
| 2006 | (New South Wales) Wild Oats XI | 2/08:52:33 | (New South Wales) Love & War | 3/22:02:37 | 78 | 69 |
| 2007 | (New South Wales) Wild Oats XI | 1/21:24:32 | (United States) Rosebud | 3/09:32:14 | 82 | 79 |
| 2008 | (New South Wales) Wild Oats XI | 1/20:34:14 | (New South Wales) Quest II | 2/17:43:32 | 100 | 92 |
| 2009 | (New Zealand) Alfa Romeo II | 2/09:02:10 | (South Australia) Two True | 4/07:57:43 | 100 | 94 |
| 2010 | (New South Wales) Wild Oats XI | 2/07:37:20 | (South Australia) Secret Men's Business 3.5 | 4/01:29:40 | 87 | 69 |
| 2011 | (New South Wales) Investec Loyal | 2/06:14:18 | (New South Wales) Loki | 3/22:34:32 | 88 | 76 |
| 2012 | (New South Wales) Wild Oats XI | **1/18:23:12** | (New South Wales) Wild Oats XI | 3/10:26:31 | 76 | 71 |
| 2013 | (New South Wales) Wild Oats XI | 2/06:07:27 | (New South Wales) Victoire | 3/18:27:43 | 94 | 84 |
| 2014 | (New South Wales) Wild Oats XI | 2/02:30:00 | (New South Wales) Wild Rose (formerly Solbourne Wild Oats) | 3/07:04:43 | 117 | 103 |
| 2015 | (United States) Comanche | 2/08:58:30 | (New South Wales) Balance V (formerly Quest II) | 4/07:27:13 | 108 | 77 |
| 2016 | (New South Wales) Perpetual Loyal | **1/13:31:20** | (New Zealand) Giacomo | 2/16:13:37 | 88 | 83 |
| 2017 | (Australia) LDV Comanche | **1/09:15:24** | (New South Wales) Ichi Ban | 2/12:13:31 | 102 | 96 |
| 2018 | (New South Wales) Wild Oats XI | 1/19:07:21 | (Tasmania) Alive | 3/06:41:16 | 85 | 79 |
| 2019 | (Australia) Comanche | 1/18:30:24 | (New South Wales) Ichi Ban | 3/04:11:05 | 157 | 154 |
| 2020 | Race cancelled due to the COVID-19 pandemic. | | | | | |
| 2021 | (Monaco) Black Jack | 2/12:37:17 | (New South Wales) Ichi Ban | 4/10:17:39 | 88 | 50 |
| 2022 | (New South Wales) Andoo Comanche | 1/11:56:48 | (New South Wales) Celestial | 2/16:35:26 | 109 | 100 |
| 2023 | (New South Wales) LawConnect | 1/19:03:58 | (Tasmania) Alive | 3/07:48:14 | 103 | 85 |
| 2024 | (New South Wales) LawConnect | 1/13:35:13 | (New South Wales) Celestial V70 | 2/16:40:38 | 104 | 74 |
| 2025 | (New South Wales) Master Lock Comanche | 2/05:03:36 | (New South Wales) Min River | 4/01:56:09 | 128 | 93 |

Notes:

- Time **in bold** denotes new race record time.
- No first place in 1985. Drake's Prayer was disqualified after winning on handicap, but 1985 NOR did not allow for lower placed finishers to move up following a disqualification.
- In the years 1991–1993 the winner of each of the IMS and IOR classes were declared the joint handicap winners. From 1994 to 2003 the IMS handicap rule was used to determine the overall winner, and from 2004 the IRC rule has been used.
- The 1975 Kialoa III was a ketch rig which was modified in 1976 and returned as a sloop to win line honors and overall in 1977.
- Apollo in 1978 and 1985 were different yachts.
- New Zealand in 1980 and 1984 were different yachts.
- Brindabella in 1991 & 1997 were different yachts.

== Records and statistics ==
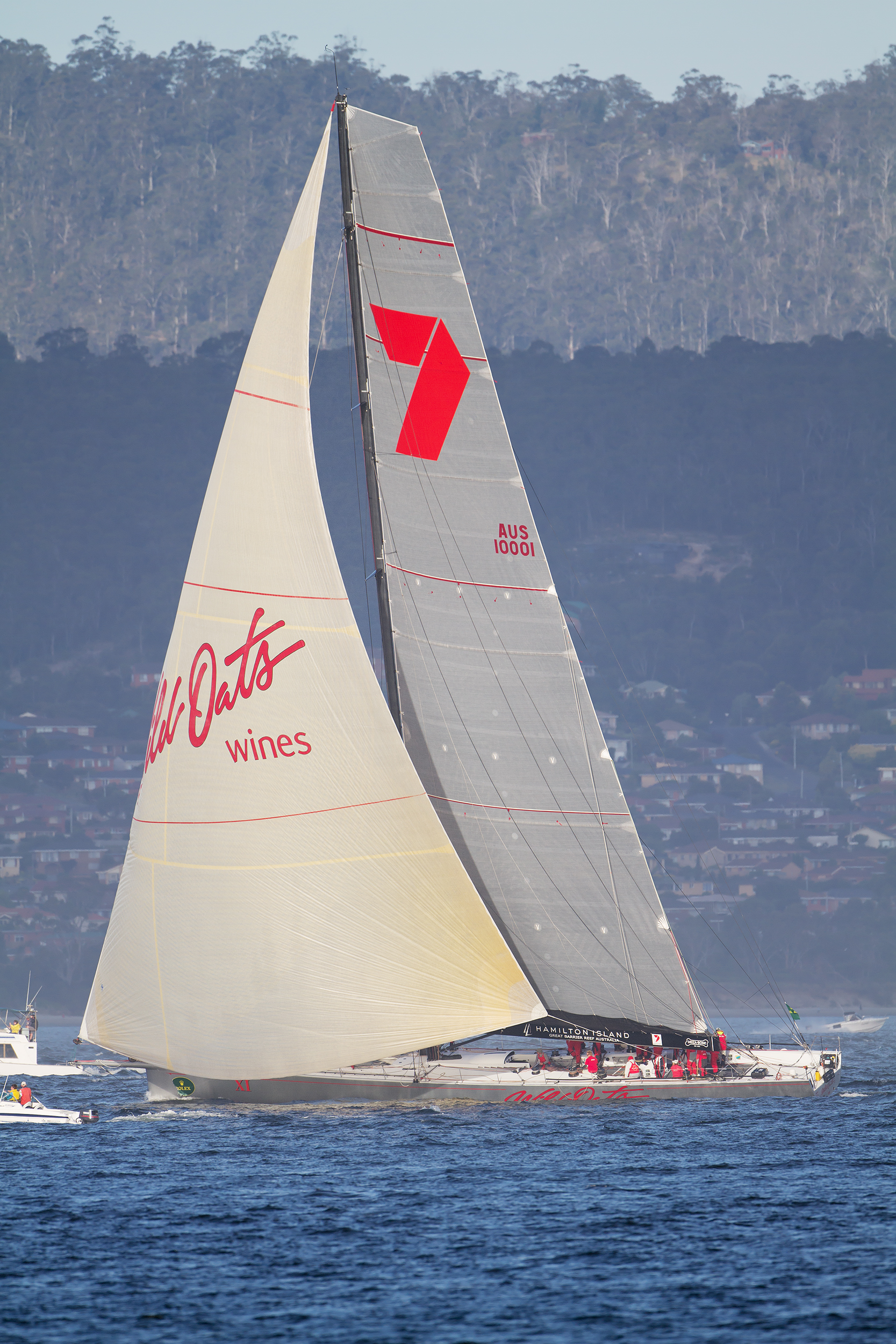
Wild Oats XI, the 2005–2008, 2010, 2012–2014, 2018 line honours winner, and 2005 and 2012 handicap honours winner about to finish the 2011 Sydney to Hobart

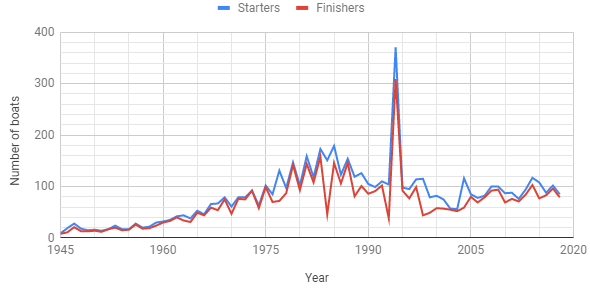
A graph of Sydney Hobart starters and finishers from 1945 to 2018

- Inaugural race winner, 1945: Rani (line and handicap honours as well as the inaugural race record)
- Fastest unofficial record belongs to Wild Oats XI had an unofficial race record time of 1 day, 8 hours, 48 minutes, and 50 seconds in the 2017 Sydney to Hobart Yacht Race.
- Fastest unclean race: 1 day 9h 15m 24s (LDV Comanche, NSW), 2017
- Total fleet: 5,509 yachts (81.01 yachts per race)
- Fleet finishing statistics: Of 5,509 yachts who have started the race since 1945, a total of 4,548 (82.56%) have completed and 961 (17.44%) yachts have retired.
- Highest retirement %: 70% of the fleet in 1984. On average, after 62 races, 81.7% of the fleet finishes annually.
- Largest fleet: 371 starters, 1994
- Smallest fleet: 9 starters, 1945 (first race)
- Smallest yacht: 27 ft (8.23m) Klinger (NSW) 1978
- Smallest yacht Line Honours winner: 35 ft (10.67m) – Nocturne (NSW) 1952 and Rani (UK) 1945.
- Largest yachts entered: 100 ft (30.48m) – Palm Beach XI (formerly Wild Oats XI) (NSW, 2009–2019, 2022, 2025), Black Jack (formerly Alfa Romeo) (MON, 2009, 2017–2019, 2021–2022), Scallywag (formerly Investec Loyal/Ragamuffin 100) (HK, 2009–2016, 2018–2019, 2021, 2023, 2025), ICAP Leopard (UK, 2009), Rapture (USA, 2009), Wild Thing (VIC, 2013), LawConnect (formerly Perpetual Loyal/Infotrack) (NSW, 2013–2019, 2021–2025), Rio 100 (USA, 2014), Comanche (NSW, 2014–2015, 2017–2019, 2022-2025), CQS (NSW, 2016), Wild Thing 100 (QLD, 2023-25) & Maritimo 100 (QLD, 2024-25).
- Largest yacht Line Honours winner: 100 ft (30.48m) – Alfa Romeo (NZ) 2009, Wild Oats XI (NSW) 2010, 2012–14, 2018, Investec LOYAL (NSW) 2011, Comanche (USA/NSW) 2015, 2017, 2019, 2022, 2025, Perpetual LOYAL (NSW) 2016, Black Jack (MON) 2021, LawConnect (NSW) 2023-24.
- Most Line Honours victories: Wild Oats XI, 9 victories
- Most Line Honours victories by skipper: Mark Richards (New South Wales) Australia, 9 victories.
- Most Handicap Honours victories: Freya (NSW), Love & War (NSW) and Ichi Ban (NSW) 3 victories each
- Most Handicap Honours victories by skipper: Magnus and Trygve Halvorsen (NSW) Australia, 4 victories
- Oldest competitor: Maluka was built in 1932 and raced in 2008 aged 76. The 9.1-metre yacht was restored by Sean Langman
- Most races by skipper: 49 Tony Cable (New South Wales), 44 John Bennetto (Tas – dec), Lou Abrahams (Vic – dec 2014).
- Race treble: Race record, Line & Handicap Honours in the same year:
  - 1945, Rani (UK)
  - 2005, 2012 Wild Oats XI (NSW).
- Double: Line & Handicap Honours in the same year:
  - 1945, Rani (UK);
  - 1972, American Eagle (USA);
  - 1977, Kialoa III (USA);
  - 1980, New Zealand (NZ);
  - 1987, Sovereign (NSW);
  - 2005, 2012 Wild Oats XI (NSW);
- Back-to-back Line Honours titles:
  - Morna (NSW) 1946, 1947 and 1948;
  - Margaret Rintoul (NSW) 1950 and 1951;
  - Kurrewa IV (Formerly Morna) Vic 1956 and 1957;
  - Solo (NSW) 1958 and 1959;
  - Astor (NSW) 1963 and 1964;
  - Wild Oats XI (NSW) 2005, 2006, 2007, 2008; and
  - LawConnect (NSW) 2023 and 2024.
- Back-to-back Handicap Honours titles:
  - Freya (NSW) 1963, 1964 and 1965;
  - Westward (Tas) 1947 and 1948.
- Closest Line Honours race finish: 7 seconds, 1982; Condor of Bermuda (Bermuda) defeated Apollo (NSW)
- Closest finish for Handicap Honours: 1 minute and 43 seconds also in 1982 when Scallyway (NSW, Australia) defeated Audacity (NSW, Australia)
- Yachts winning Line Honours to be later disqualified: Wild Wave (1953), [[Nirvana (yacht)|Nirvana]] (1983) and Rothmans (1990)
- Yachts to win Handicap Honours to be later disqualified: Drake's Prayer (1985)
- Most successful yacht designer: Bruce Farr (NZ), 15 overall winners
- First known female sailors: Jane Tate and Dagmar O’Brien (both in 1946). O'Brien's yacht (Connella) retired, thus Tate has the honour of being the first female to complete the event and a trophy is now named in her honour.
- First all-female-crewed yacht: Barbarian, 1975 (skipper: Vicki Wilman)
- Most races for one woman: 15 by Adrienne Cahalan (AUS); (navigator for 2000 winner Nicorette)
- First indigenous woman to take part: Kathy Collingridge, former NSW award-winning police officer, age 37, crewed on One Time Sidewinder 1996
- In 1994 at the 50th Sydney to Hobart, Albert Lee was a part of the making waves foundation's team which was the first time a fully disabled crew had sailed in an ocean race.
- Worst disaster: 1998, 6 sailors died and 5 yachts sunk; 115 yachts started but only 43 finished.
- Sunken yachts: Clywd (1993), Adjuster (1993), Winston Churchill (1998), VC Offshore Stand Aside (1998), Sword of Orion (1998), Miintinta (1998), Midnight Special (1998), Ray White Koomooloo (2006) and Georgia (2008).
- Yachtsmen to have lost their lives: Mike Bannister (Winston Churchill, 1998), Glyn Charles (Sword of Orion, 1998), Ray Crawford (Billabong, 1988), John Dean (Winston Churchill, 1998), Bruce Guy (Business Post Naiad, 1998), Jim Lawler (Winston Churchill, 1998), Roy Quaden (Flying Fish Arctos, 2024), Wally Russell (Yahoo II, 1984), John Sarney (Inca, 1973), Phillip Skeggs (Business Post Naiad, 1998), Nick Smith (Bowline, 2024), Peter Taylor (BP Flying Colours, 1989) and Hugh (Barry) Vallance (Zilvergeest III, 1975)

== Sponsors, supporters and prizes ==
Rolex has been the naming rights sponsor of the race since 2002. Other sponsors of the race include Appliances Online, Nortel and TasPorts.

It generally costs each of the major contenders for line honours millions of dollars to equip themselves for the race; however, there is no prize money. The only official award is a Rolex watch from the race sponsor for the fastest and handicap-winning yacht captains. Entrants compete purely for the honour of the title. That being said, costs are almost always offset by sponsors.

The overall (handicap) winner on corrected time is awarded The George Adams Tattersall Cup, first awarded to the winner of the 1946 race (and retrospectively to the 1945 winner).

Among the other trophies awarded during the race are the J. H. Illingworth Challenge Cup for the line honours boat and the Jane Tate Memorial Trophy for the first female skipper.

=== Event sponsors ===
- 1945–74: No Sponsor
- 1975: TAA
- 1976–83: Hitachi
- 1984–88: AWA
- 1989–90: Nortel
- 1991–94: Kodak
- 1995–2000: Telstra
- 2001: No Sponsor
- 2002–present: Rolex

== In popular culture ==
The race features in the 2007 novel The Storm Prophet by Hector Macdonald.

== See also ==
- Sailing in Australia
- Launceston to Hobart Yacht Race
- Melbourne to Hobart Yacht Race
- List of events in Tasmania
