= John Illingworth (yacht designer) =

Captain John Holden Illingworth (1903 – 7 March 1980) was an English naval engineer in the Royal Navy who achieved fame as a yacht racer and yacht designer. Described on his death as "the father of post-war offshore sailing racing", he held most of the senior positions in British yachting and pioneered several innovations in the sport.

== Career ==
In pre-war England Illingworth was a Royal Navy officer serving in submarines. In his leisure time, he designed sailing boats and raced offshore. During World War II he served as a captain in the Navy.

In 1945, after the end of the war, Illingworth was in Australia, organising repairs in Sydney for the British Pacific Fleet. He was invited to join other yachtsmen in a cruise to Hobart in Tasmania, which he promptly suggested should be a race. Illingworth skippered his newly acquired yacht Rani to win both on elapsed time and on handicap. The Sydney to Hobart Race has since become one of the great offshore yacht races.

Back in England, Illingworth stayed with the navy, commanding a naval air station. He became Commodore of the Royal Ocean Racing Club, and in 1947 he launched the boat which made his name: Myth of Malham.

=== Myth of Malham ===
Myth of Malham was a 37-foot-6-inch (11.43 m) sloop built at Greenock, designed by Laurent Giles to Illingworth's specifications. In a radical departure from the norms of the time, Myth of Malham was of light displacement, with short overhangs in contrast to the elongated overhangs of other yachts. Other innovations included a masthead rig, in which the forestay is carried all the way to the head of the mast, rather than terminating lower down the mast as on the fractional rigs which were the norm at the time. The rating rules at the time attached less significance to the area of headsails than of the mainsail, so the masthead rig effectively gave the boat "free" sail area.

Myth of Malham won the Fastnet Race in 1947 and 1949, and in 1957 was part of the winning team for the first Admiral's Cup.

Gipsy Moth IV was a 54-foot ketch he designed, in 1964, for Sir Frances Chichester. Its purpose was for a singled-handed circumnavigation. As described in Chichester's book Gipsy Moth Circles The World (Coward-McCann, Inc NY), she was an ill-mannered lady.

== Junior Offshore Group ==
Illingworth believed that offshore racing could be conducted safely in boats which were much smaller, lighter and simpler than was the norm at the time. Shortly after the launch of Myth of Malham, he worked with Laurent Giles to create the RNSA 24 class of yachts, at 32 feet (9.8 m) LOA and 24 feet (7.3 m) LWL, with a displacement of 4.3 long tons (4,400 kg). In 1950, he was a founding member and elected the first president of the Junior Offshore Group, an offshore racing club catering for smaller yachts than the Royal Ocean Racing Club allowed at the time.
