= Storm Bay =

Bay in Tasmania, Australia

- Location in Tasmania
- Location: Southeast Tasmania
- Coordinates: 43°10′12″S 147°26′24″E
- Primary inflows: River Derwent
- Primary outflows: Tasman Sea
- Ocean/sea sources: South Pacific Ocean
- Basin countries: Australia
- Frozen: never
- Islands: Bruny
- Settlements: Hobart

The Storm Bay is a large bay in the south-east region of Tasmania, Australia.

The bay is the river mouth to the River Derwent estuary and serves as the main port of Hobart, the capital city of Tasmania.

The bay is bordered by Bruny Island to the west, the South Arm Peninsula to the north, and the Tasman Peninsula to the east; with its outflow to the Tasman Sea, and thereafter to the South Pacific Ocean.

The first European to reach Storm Bay was Abel Tasman in 1642.

== See also ==
- Geography of Tasmania
