= Cruising Yacht Club of Australia =

Yacht club based in Sydney, New South Wales

Coordinates: 33°52′27″S 151°14′2″E

- Burgee
- Short name: CYCA
- Founded: 1944
- Location: Darling Point, Sydney, Australia
- Commodore: Arthur Lane
- Website: Cruising Yacht Club of Australia

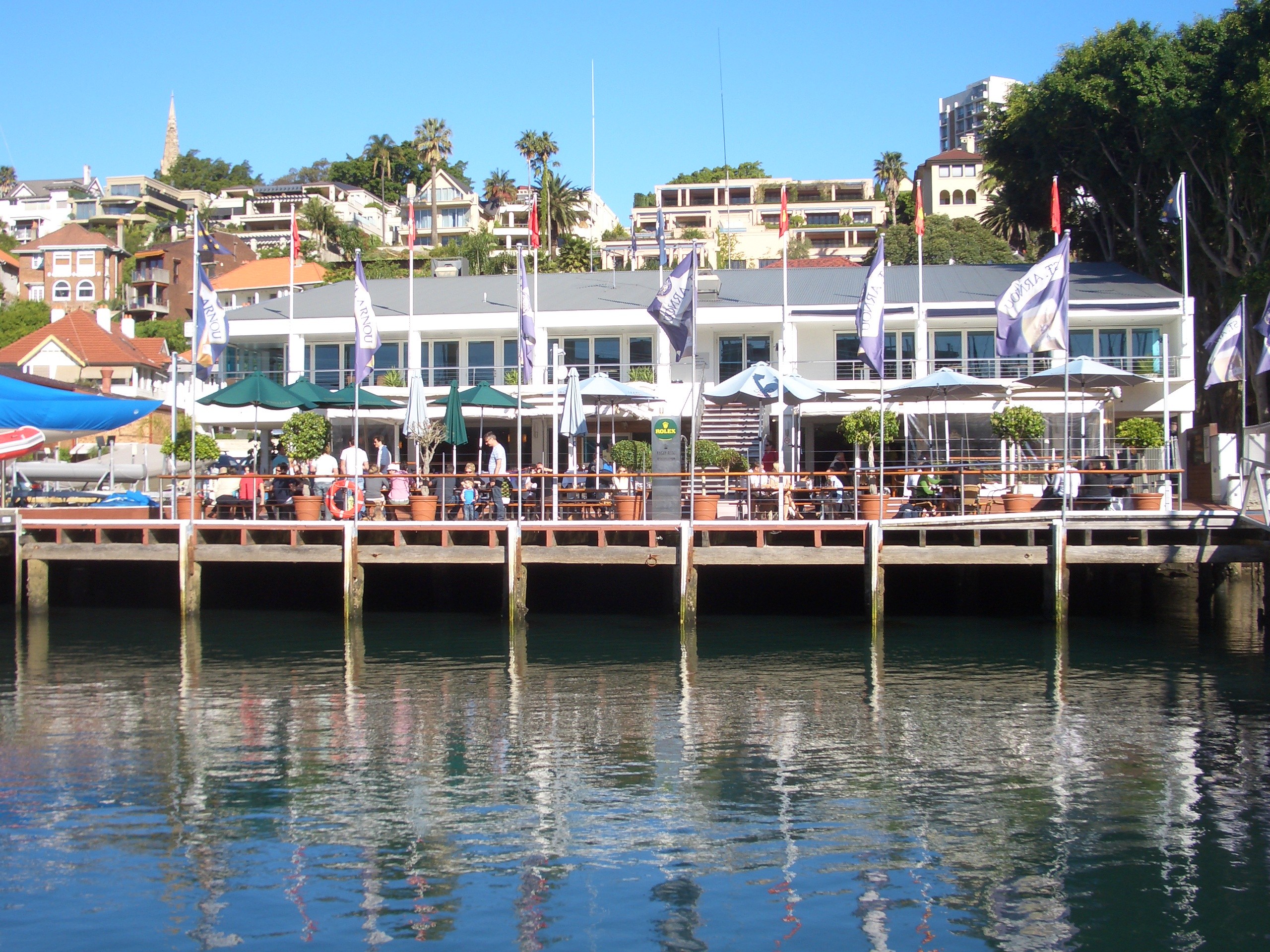
The CYCA clubhouse

The Cruising Yacht Club of Australia (CYCA) was established in 1944 and soon afterwards established a clubhouse in Darling Point, inner-east Sydney. The club is known as one of Australia's premier yacht clubs, and is acknowledged as one of the leaders in ocean racing in the world. The club hosts the annual Rolex Sydney Hobart Yacht Race.

In 2024, the CYCA celebrated the 80th anniversary of the club and will be running the 80th Sydney Hobart Yacht Race in December 2025.

In October 2018, the Club finished a major makeover to its Darling Point premises, with the clubhouse fully renovated.

== Facilities ==
CYCA facilities include a marina on Rushcutters Bay capable of berthing yachts up to 30 metres (98 ft) in length and five-star function rooms and restaurants. It currently has a membership of over 3,500.

== Board of Directors ==
As of 2024–2025:

- Commodore – Dr Sam Haynes
- Vice-Commodore – David Jacobs
- Rear-Commodores – Peter Gothard
- Treasurer – Jules Hall
- Directors – David Griffith AO, Tom Barker, Prof. Sarah Hosking, Greg Antipas and Craig Neil
