= De Havilland Marine =

de Havilland Marine
- Industry: Marine manufacturing
- Founded: 1959
- Defunct: 15 June 1982
- Fate: Ceased ops, deregistered
- Headquarters: Bankstown, New South Wales, Australia
- Key people: Alan Payne

de Havilland Marine was a division of Hawker de Havilland Australia Pty. Ltd. which is now owned by Boeing Australia and known as Boeing Aerostructures Australia.

Following the downturn of aviation manufacturing in the late 1950s, the Australian subsidiary of de Havilland looked to produce products utilizing the skills and knowledge available to the company. It found a ready market in the production of a range of small aluminium boats made using techniques similar to those employed in the aircraft industry. de Havilland Marine's designers were initially headed by Frank Bailey, the Vampire Production Engineering Manager, starting in 1959. Later designers included in 1966 naval architect Alan Payne, designer of Australia's first America's Cup (1962 America's Cup) challengers Gretel and Gretel II. de Havilland Australia built the mast and rig for Gretel.

In 1965, The Sydney Morning Herald reported the marine division had produced 15,000 craft of all types, with a projected annual production of 5,000 craft per year. By the end of the small boat production in the 1970s over 55,000 had been produced

de Havilland Marine (Large Craft) (registered company number F11799) was located on the waters edge at 5-7 Burroway Road, Homebush Bay. Due to a lack of new business it closed its doors in 1982. In the years prior it manufactured various large aluminium craft for both the local and international market. These included Carpentaria Class Patrol Boats for Burma & the Solomon Islands, Titan Work Boats for the New South Wales (NSW) government, and the hulls of the Nepean Belle which still operates on the Nepean River in NSW.

== History ==
de Havilland Australia opened in Melbourne in March 1927 as de Havilland Aircraft Pty. Ltd. In 1930 the company moved to Bankstown (a suburb of Sydney), where it acted as an agency for the parent company, with assembly, repair and spares facilities for its range of aircraft. Aircraft design and full manufacture by de Havilland Australia (DHA) did not take place until the Second World War. Following the end of the war, the Australian company diversified into an aircraft sales agency and engineering and marine craft manufacturing. In 1960, following the takeover of the parent company de Havilland Holdings Ltd of England by the Hawker Siddeley Group, de Havilland Australia was renamed Hawker de Havilland. The company is now owned by Boeing Australia, who announced on 6 February 2009 that Hawker de Havilland would be known as Boeing Aerostructures Australia.

== Marine craft ==
Following a report in January 1959 by Daryl Murray Jones to the New Products Committee, it was recommended that small aluminium boat production be started in time to meet the Spring selling season, starting with an 11/12-foot dinghy. A naval architect designed prototype was commissioned, following which Frank Bailey, the Vampire Production Engineering Manager, redesigned it to be easier and cheaper to make, while also making it more attractive to the anticipated market.

On 21 September 1959 the Board approved the manufacture of 50 12-foot boats, all of which had been sold by 31 December 1959. By the end of 1960, 1100 boats of four different models had been made and sold. The brand name Topper was also adopted in 1960, intended initially to demonstrate that these lightweight and strong boats were suitable for transporting on a car top.

While Frank Bailey designed the first aluminium 12-foot Tiki sailing boat and 12-foot fibreglass Vagabond, de Havilland Marine later produced three small fibreglass yachts designed by Alan Payne, following trials from 1966. These were the 10-foot Gipsy, the 16-foot Corsair and the 18-foot six-inch trailer/sailer Rambler. By 1976 with 549 made, the Corsair had become a national class, sailed in five Australian states and Papua New Guinea, with its production continuing to this day.

As part of a range of marketing activities to promote the strength and sea worthiness of the aluminium boats, Leon Simons and Bryan Dodd from de Havilland Marine took a de Havilland "Sea Topper" from Sydney to Melbourne (a distance of 700 miles), on 8 July 1965.

Ben Lexcen and Craig Whitworth of Miller and Whitworth joined with de Havilland Marine in 1964 to design, produce and market a range of aluminium yacht spars which started to replace the traditional wooden spars.

In 1960, de Havilland Marine also obtained a license to produce a power boat using a water jet propulsion system developed by Bill Hamilton, founder of C.W.F. Hamilton & Co of New Zealand. A prototype hull was equipped with a propulsion unit and was tested at Rose Bay, New South Wales.

=== Manufacturing process ===
The first stage in the manufacturing of aluminium boats was to cut out the hull skins and the other sheet metal parts such as the seats using templates under a radial arm router. Sections were then formed by a brake press and swaging, to form the gunwales and hull folds. Stiffening of sheet metal panels was by means of a 3,000 ton rubber press. Extruded gunwale, keel and strake sections of the hull were initially formed in a half-hard condition for ease of working and drop hammering, later being placed in a curing oven to bring them to full-hard condition. The skin sections were welded on wooden jigs on which the seats, gunwales, decks and extruded sections were positioned and riveted into position. The boat was then tested in a pressure tank to reveal any water leaks. The finished craft was then painted in a temperature-controlled paint shop. de Havilland also produced the polyurethane flotation material used in the boats which shaped and fitted into position. The company was noted for its use of rivets to join sections of the craft, together with the more common use of welding. In its advertisements, de Havilland Marine referred to this riveting process by the Sealomatic name.

=== Logo and branding ===
The company logo was similar to other members of the de Havilland group in that the letters D and H were superimposed on the wings of an aircraft, which in turn were overlaid onto the design of a ship's anchor. A number of logo variants were used during the marine division's existence in newspaper advertisements. During 1966, the division was styled Hawker de Havilland Marine often followed by the craft range, i.e. Feathercraft Division.

=== Range of craft ===
de Havilland Marine manufactured craft from yachts and sportboats to workboats: from the Toppercraft range, Sea Topper, Standard Topper, Topper Cub, and Topper Playboy; from the Feathercraft range, Apache, Bobcat, Comanche, Mustang, Pawnee, Sea Otter and Seminole; from the Yacht range, Corsair, Gipsy 3 m (10 ft) cat-rigged, and Vagabond; other craft include the Customs boat, Hercules, John, and Norseman.

== Bibliography ==
- Bain, Gordon. de Havilland: A Pictorial Tribute. London: AirLife, 1992. ISBN 1-85648-243-X.
- Bransom, Alan. The Tiger Moth Story, Fifth Edition. Manchester, UK: Crécy Publishing Ltd., 2005. ISBN 0-85979-103-3.
- Jackson, A J. de Havilland Aircraft since 1909. Putnam, 1987. ISBN 0-85177-802-X
- Carolan, A 50 Not Out Hawker de Havilland Limited, 9 May 1996
