= Buccaneer 210 =

1974 cruiser sailboat

Development
- Designer: Alan Payne
- Location: United States
- Year: 1974
- Builder: Bayliner Marine Corp.
- Role: Cruiser
- Name: Buccaneer 210

Boat
- Displacement: 3,000 lb (1,361 kg)
- Draft: 2.00 ft (0.61 m)

Hull
- Type: monohull
- Construction: fiberglass
- LOA: 20.83 ft (6.35 m)
- LWL: 18.33 ft (5.59 m)
- Beam: 8.00 ft (2.44 m)
- Engine: outboard motor

Hull appendages
- Keel: long keel
- Ballast: 900 lb (408 kg)
- Rudder: transom-mounted rudder

Rig
- Rig type: Bermuda rig
- I foretriangle height: 26.00 ft (7.92 m)
- J foretriangle base: 8.25 ft (2.51 m)
- P mainsail luff: 22.00 ft (6.71 m)
- E mainsail foot: 8.25 ft (2.51 m)

Sails
- Sailplan: masthead sloop
- Mainsail area: 90.75 sq ft (8.431 m^{2})
- Jib/genoa area: 107.25 sq ft (9.964 m^{2})
- Total sail area: 198.00 sq ft (18.395 m^{2})

Racing
- PHRF: 300

The Buccaneer 210 is an American trailerable sailboat that was designed by Alan Payne as a cruiser and first built in 1974.

The boat is a development of the Columbia T-23, using the same hull molds.

== Production ==
The design was built by Bayliner Marine Corp. in the United States, starting in 1974, but it is now out of production.

== Design ==
The Buccaneer 210 is a recreational keelboat, built predominantly of fiberglass, with wood trim. It has a masthead sloop rig, a raked stem, a plumb transom, a transom-hung rudder controlled by a tiller and a fixed, very shallow draft, long keel. It displaces 3,000 lb (1,361 kg), carries 900 lb (408 kg) of ballast and has positive foam flotation.

The boat has a draft of 2.00 ft (0.61 m) with the standard keel.

The boat is normally fitted with a small 3 to 6 hp (2 to 4 kW) outboard motor for docking and maneuvering.

The design has sleeping accommodation for six people, with a double "V"-berth in the bow cabin, a drop-down dinette table that converts into a double berth in the main cabin and an aft cabin with a double berth under the cockpit. The galley is located on the starboard side just forward of the companionway ladder. The galley is equipped with a two-burner stove and a sink. The head is located under the bow cabin berth. Cabin headroom is 68 in (170 cm) and the fresh water tank has a capacity of 20 U.S. gallons (76 L; 17 imp gal).

The design has a PHRF racing average handicap of 300 and a hull speed of 5.7 kn (10.6 km/h).

== Operational history ==
In a 1976 Cruising World review reported, "quite frankly, the Buccaneer 210 contradicts itself, At 21', it should be a small boat, but one look inside tells you it has to be much bigger. Stand-up headroom and full eight-foot beam enhance the spaciousness, and bright new fabrics and finishing add to the open feeling."

In a 2010 review Steve Henkel wrote, "in the 1970s, sailboat marketers perceived a public out-cry for more space below, more creature comforts, and more features which would appeal to women. Many yacht designers couldn't face the prospect of ruining the graceful appearance of their creations by raising the deck of a small sailboat beyond what looked good. But Bayliner Marine, used to designing powerboats which already were boxy enough to have more or less the same silhouette as a wedding cake, had no such compunctions. Ignoring conventional aesthetic considerations, Bayliner came up with the high-topped but roomy design shown here. Best features: What? A 21-foot boat that sleeps six, has 5' 8" headroom, a dinette, and a full galley including a built-in icebox? Feast your eyes ... Worst features: All the design considerations that allow the "best features" listed above also mean a high, boxy look and excessive windage, that can cause poor upwind performance from sideways slippage (accentuated by a too-shallow fixed keel). The Buccaneer 210 also has a very low SA/D ratio and a high D/L ratio, both tending to make her slow in light air. And the cabin sole and sides of the hull are covered with plush pile carpeting. Ugh!"

== See also ==
- List of sailing boat types

Related development

- Buccaneer 200
- Buccaneer 220
