= Alan Payne (naval architect) =

Australian naval architect

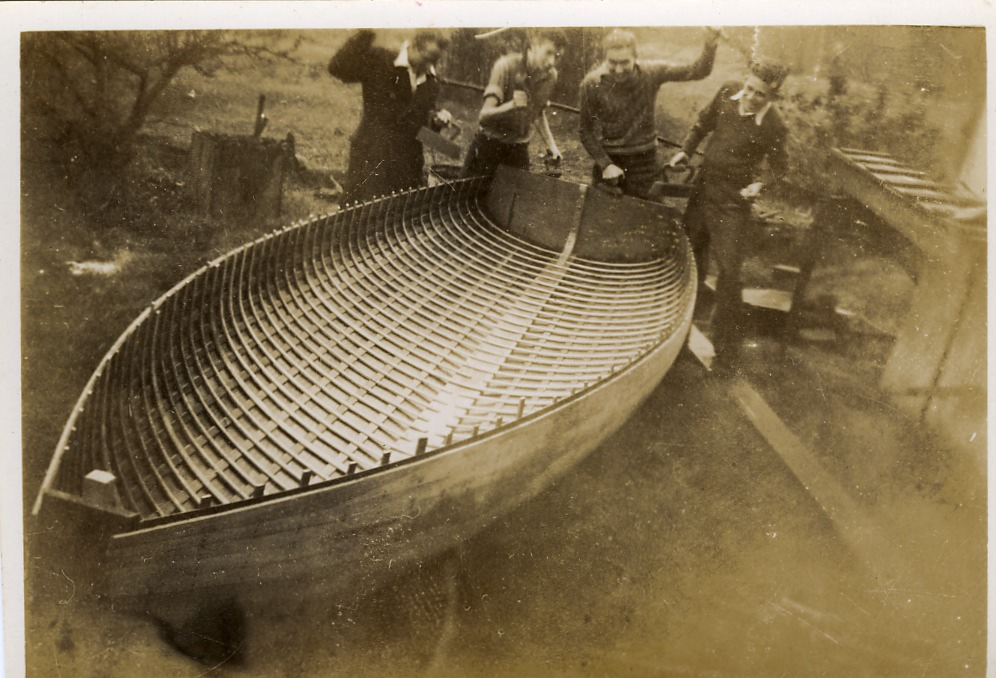
Alan Payne (right) and Bryce Mortlock (next left) constructing a Payne-Mortlock sailing canoe, late 1940s.

Alan Newbury Payne AM (11 December 1921, London – 20 June 1995, Sydney) was a naval architect born in England but who worked in Australia. His yacht designs were readily built by both professionals and amateurs, and remain well represented in the ocean-going and coastal yacht fleet.

== Youth ==
Payne was born in London, England in 1921, but moved as part of his family to Australia in 1925. His father, Sidney, was a ship's master, but went to shore based activities and then emigrated with the family to Brisbane, Queensland to work for Dalgety's on the waterfront. The family moved to Sydney, where Payne attended Sydney Grammar School and sailed small craft with his brother Bill and friends.

== Education in naval architecture and boat design ==
Payne worked at the Royal Australian Navy's Cockatoo Island Dockyard in Sydney during World War II and meanwhile training as a naval architect at Sydney Technical College, becoming in 1945 its first graduate, awarded a diploma that at the time was the highest level available.

== Early work ==
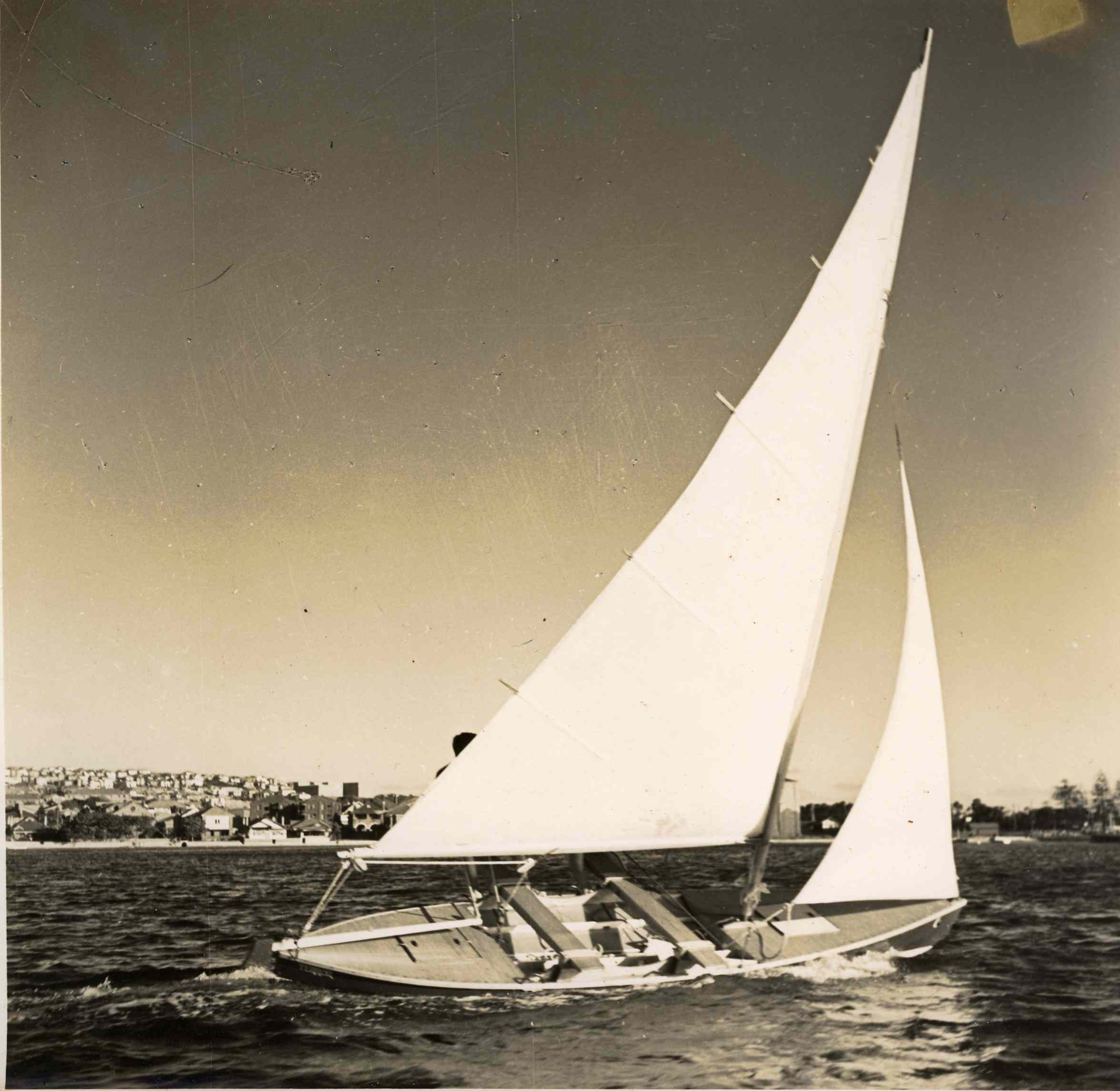
Payne-Mortlock sailing canoe

Payne created a private practice in naval architecture immediately after World War II, initially designing yachts and launches, then later some fishing trawlers. Payne was a crew member on HORIZON in the 1945, first Sydney to Hobart Yacht Race, and several subsequent events. An early design of this period was the Payne-Mortlock sailing canoe, a 5.8m design that is still raced, designed with his friend Bryce Mortlock.

At different times Payne worked alone or with just one employee, and even returned to Cockatoo Dockyard for a period in the 1950s. From about 1957 onwards he had a firm under his name and a varying number of employees. In the mid-1960s he left yacht design to work as an engineer for client Russell Slade at his Bonds clothing plant, but eventually returned to his first profession. He was attached for a short period to the English naval architects Burness, Corlett & Partners when they established an office in Sydney in the 1970s, and formed a partnership with Howard Peachey in the late 1980s.

== Significant designs ==
Payne's first designs were often in collaboration with Bryce Mortlock. Together they began designing and building their own craft, initially for the Restricted 12 Foot Skiff class. The Payne-Mortlock sailing canoe was their major work, became famous, and helped bring Payne to the attention of the sailing world. He was also responsible for designing the Corsair (dinghy), a 16-foot, three-handed design as well as the 1974 Buccaneer 200 and the 1976 Columbia 7.6.

Payne's first design that sailed in the Sydney to Hobart race was Nocturne, a 35-foot-long (11 m) raised-deck wooden cutter originally planned as a harbour racer, but adapted to ocean racing by the owner Bob Bull with the designer's input. It won the light-weather 1952 Sydney to Hobart Yacht Race on line honours. Nocturne was a lightweight yacht with a spade rudder, and the tough conditions usually encountered in ocean racing convinced Payne that it was better to design strong and seaworthy ocean racing and cruising yachts. The long keeled steel Solo in 1953, the steel multi chine Koonya, and the wooden Tasman Seabird Class designs in 1959 are boats with these qualities; In 1959 the newly launched Tasman Seabird Cherana won the race, sister ship Kaleena was fifth and Solo took line honours.

The Koonya design was to become a model on which many other Payne designs (and yacht lengths) were based, with the multiple chine kinks in the steel becoming almost a Payne trademark. The deep keel, sloping from the bow, with enclosed lead ballast, was another Payne mark.

Also during the 1950s, Payne was chief architect for De Havilland Marine, an offshoot of aircraft manufacturer, de Havilland Australia that was seeking to diversify its aluminium products.

=== America's Cup ===
Sir Frank Packer commissioned Payne to design Australia's first America's Cup challenger for the 1962 event, the 12 metre class Gretel. The champion American design Vim was brought to Australia and studied closely. Payne and his small team designed and tested over 30 models before building Gretel, and also designed most of the fittings and mechanical features for the new challenger. A number of the items had advanced or new features such as cross-linking the main winches (grinders) to double the number of crew who could operate a winch. Many observers felt Gretel was as good as or better than the defender.

Payne's second 12-metre design, Gretel II in 1970, added to his international recognition as a leading yacht designer. His third design for 1983, the aluminium Advance, was hampered by a lack of funds and a decision to orient the boat to light weather conditions.

=== Other work ===
Alan Payne continued with cruising yacht design, mainly deep keeled steel yachts. His designs were always well proportioned with a classic style that was often admired. Few stand out as unorthodox or unusual. All designs were based on good engineering and shipwright practices, and any different features were carefully considered in the design process. Plans by him or his draughtsmen were usually exceptionally well detailed and presented. These plans remain available.

Exemplifying his diversity, Payne also designed in wood, such as his 1966 design Jiemba, a full-height motorsailer for Pat Clancy, Mayor of Sale, built in Metung, Victoria by [www.bullscruisers.com.au/metung Bulls], using King Billy Pine planking over Spotted gum frames and decks of local Celery Top Pine. It was soon sold, but remains in good order 48 years later.

In partnership with 1945 graduate and colleague Keith Lawson at Seawork Pty Ltd, Payne developed the design for the first catamaran ferry on Sydney Harbour, the First Fleet class. The Charlotte, one of the First Fleet ferries is alongside the wharf at the Australian National Maritime Museum, Darling Harbour, Sydney.

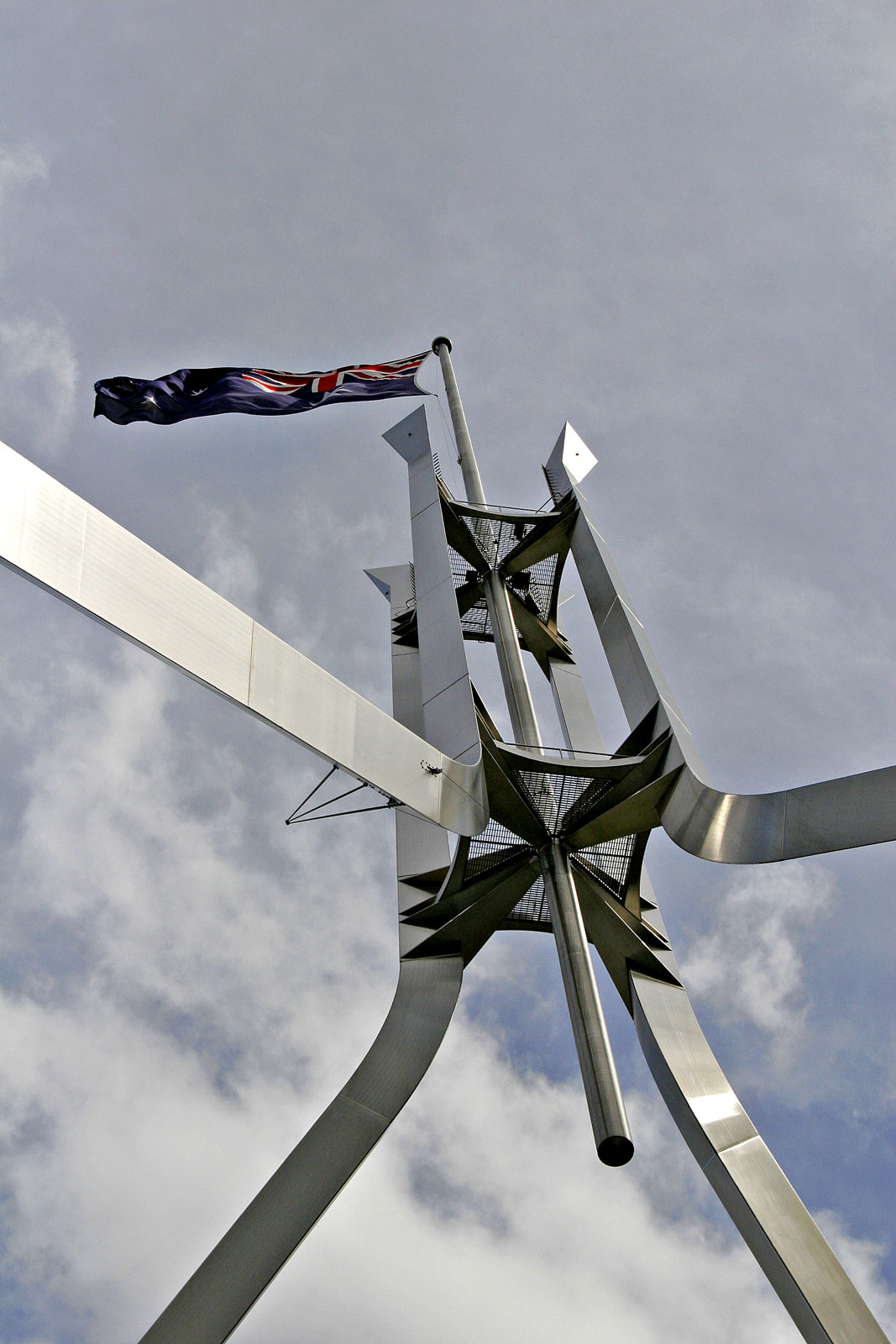
APH flagstaff

He also engineered the means by which the flag at the Australian Parliament House in Canberra (completed 1988) was raised and lowered on its flagstaff.

Whilst yachts tended to be the major output of his design work he also prepared plans for launches and motorboats, dinghies, a small number of commercial fishing trawlers and as a consultant advised on many rig changes and other details.

== Family ==
Payne married twice, his first, short marriage ending in the early 1970s. Later, he married Wendy Hay, and they had twin daughters, Rosetta and Sarah. Zetty carries on the career of her father having graduated as a naval architect from the University of New South Wales with a PhD.

Payne was also highly influential in the lives of two nephews, David (industrial designer) and Geoff (draughtsman/designer and award-winning cruising sailor), who also continued the tradition.

== Recognition ==
Alan Payne was very highly respected by his peers in Australia and internationally. In the Queen's Birthday Honours on 13 June 1993, Payne's contribution to Australian yachting was recognised with the award of a Member of the Order of Australia (AM) "for services to naval architecture as a designer of racing and cruising yachts."

== Designs ==
- Buccaneer 200
- Buccaneer 210
- Buccaneer 240
- Columbia 7.6
- Columbia 8.3
- Columbia 8.7
- Columbia T-23
- Corsair (dinghy)
- Hughes-Columbia 27
