= Buccaneer 240 =

Sailboat class

Development
- Designer: disputed
- Location: United States
- Year: 1975
- Builder: Bayliner
- Role: Cruiser
- Name: Buccaneer 240

Boat
- Displacement: 4,000 lb (1,814 kg)
- Draft: 2.50 ft (0.76 m)

Hull
- Type: monohull
- Construction: fiberglass
- LOA: 23.67 ft (7.21 m)
- LWL: 20.33 ft (6.20 m)
- Beam: 8.00 ft (2.44 m)
- Engine: outboard motor

Hull appendages
- Keel: long keel
- Ballast: 1,250 lb (567 kg)
- Rudder: transom-mounted rudder

Rig
- Rig type: Bermuda rig
- I foretriangle height: 26.20 ft (7.99 m)
- J foretriangle base: 9.33 ft (2.84 m)
- P mainsail luff: 22.25 ft (6.78 m)
- E mainsail foot: 8.75 ft (2.67 m)

Sails
- Sailplan: masthead sloop
- Mainsail area: 97.34 sq ft (9.043 m^{2})
- Jib/genoa area: 122.22 sq ft (11.355 m^{2})
- Total sail area: 219.57 sq ft (20.399 m^{2})

Racing
- PHRF: 270

The Buccaneer 240 and Buccaneer 245 are recreational keelboats built from 1975 to 1979 by Bayliner Marine Corp. in the United States.

== Design ==
McArthur says that the boats are Bayliner developments of Alan Payne's Columbia T-23, adapted from a "splashed" mold using a T-23 hull. Henkel claims that the designs are a scaled down version of William Garden's Buccaneer 300, created by Bayliner's in-house design team.

The design goals were outlined by Bayliner as a roomy, trailerable, cruising-oriented sailboat with six feet of below deck headroom.

The Buccaneer 240 and 245 are recreational keelboats, built predominantly of fiberglass, with wood trim. They have masthead sloop rigs, raked stems, plumb transoms, transom-hung rudders controlled by tillers and fixed, shallow draft, long keels.

The design has sleeping accommodation for four people, with a double "V"-berth in the bow cabin and an aft cabin with a double berth. The galley is located on the port side at the companionway ladder. The galley is equipped with a two-burner stove and a double sink. The large head is located beside the companionway on the starboard side, has 72 in (180 cm) of headroom and includes a shower. The main cabin headroom is also 72 in (180 cm) and the fresh water tank has a capacity of 20 U.S. gallons (76 L; 17 imp gal). The number of the ports was not consistent through the production run of the boat.

The design has a PHRF racing average handicap of 270 and a hull speed of 6.0 kn (11.1 km/h).

In a 2010 review Steve Henkel described the boat as a "floating apartment for coasting downwind. He wrote, "the Buccaneer Design Team ... created a group of high, boxy looking "wedding cake" designs with keels too shallow and with too little ballast for good upwind performance. Best features: Very extensive accommodations, with double berth aft, V-berth forward, convertible dinette in a "lounge" area that doesn't need to be made up every morning, a huge "bathroom" with head, sink, and shower, galley with a "refrigerator" (actually, just an icebox?), stove, and two-basin sink, Oh, and there's 6-foot headroom too. Worst features: The penalty for the good living arrangements below is a boat that sails downwind satisfactorily, but is no good upwind."

== Variants ==
Buccaneer 240
This outboard motor-equipped model was introduced in 1975. It has a length overall of 23.67 ft (7.2 m), a waterline length of 20.33 ft (6.2 m), displaces 4,000 lb (1,814 kg) and carries 1,250 lb (567 kg) of ballast. The boat has a draft of 2.50 ft (0.76 m) with the standard keel. The boat is fitted with a small 4 to 8 hp (3 to 6 kW) outboard motor for docking and maneuvering.
Buccaneer 245
This inboard diesel engine-equipped model was introduced in 1975. It has a length overall of 23.67 ft (7.2 m), a waterline length of 20.33 ft (6.2 m), displaces 3,000 lb (1,361 kg) and carries 1,050 lb (476 kg) of ballast. The boat has a draft of 2.30 ft (0.70 m) with the standard keel. The boat is fitted with a small Volvo 7.5 hp (6 kW) inboard motor for docking and maneuvering.
