= Vagabond (sailing dinghy) =

Sailing dinghy in Australia

Development
- Name: Vagabond

Boat
- Crew: 2

Hull
- Type: Monohull
- Construction: Fibreglass
- Hull weight: 110 kilograms (240 lb)
- LOA: 3.700 metres (12 ft 1.7 in)
- Beam: 1.780 metres (5 ft 10.1 in)

Sails
- Upwind sail area: 9.9 square metres (107 sq ft)

The Vagabond is a 3.7m fibreglass sailing dinghy sailed in Australia . It is often used as a training boat due to its simplicity but also has the option of a symmetrical spinnaker. It was at one time made by De Havilland Marine Yacht Division. Series II, with a white top, flip up high aspect centreboard, and fully battened mainsail are currently being manufactured at Noosa in Queensland by the Noosa Yacht and Rowing Club. There are a number of race events organised by the Vagabond Class Association including youth, state and national titles. This dinghy can be confused with the Vagabond 14 made by Hobie Cat and now called either a Holder 14 or Hobie-one. Jack Holt also designed a "Vagabond" dinghy of about the same size.
