= Payne-Mortlock sailing canoe =

Racing dinghy

Payne-Mortlock Sailing Canoe
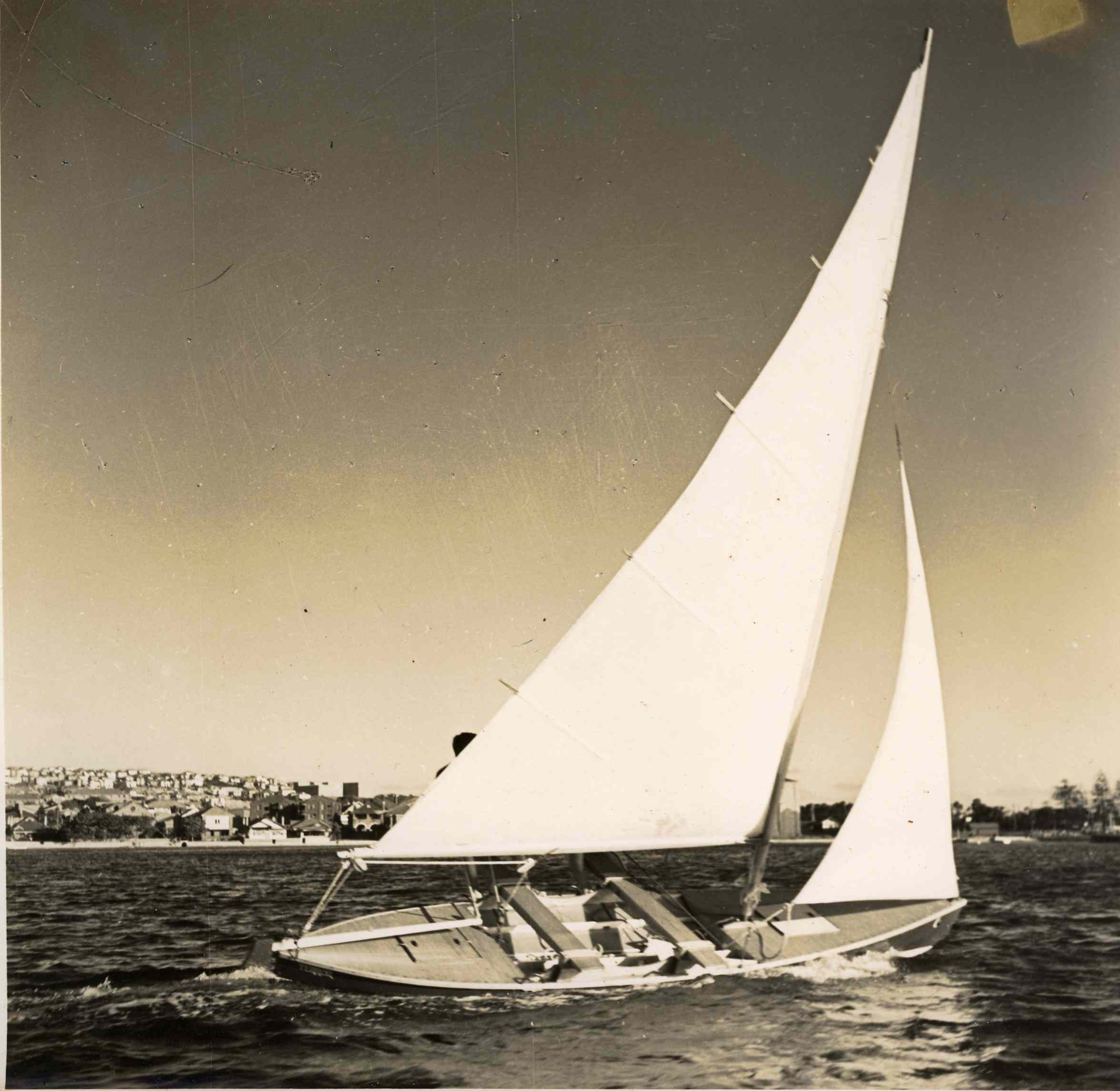
- An early photo the Payne-Mortlock canoe

- Class symbol

Development
- Designer: Alan Payne, Bill Payne and Bryce Mortlock
- Location: Victoria, Australia
- Year: 1946–1947
- Name: Payne-Mortlock Sailing Canoe

Boat
- Crew: 2
- Trapeze: No (employs hiking planks)

Hull
- Type: Monohull
- Construction: Plywood, some modern boats in Fiberglass
- LOH: 5.79 metres (19.0 ft)
- Beam: 1.37 metres (4.5 ft)

Hull appendages
- Keel: Centerboard

Sails
- Mainsail area: 11.7 square metres (126 sq ft)
- Jib/genoa area: 4.8 square metres (52 sq ft)
- Spinnaker area: 9.8 square metres (105 sq ft)

The Payne–Mortlock Sailing Canoe is a 5.8m, two person, senior racing dinghy, rigged with a mainsail, jib and spinnaker. Designed in the mid-late 1940s by Alan Payne, (also known for designing the Australian America's Cup Challengers, Gretel and Gretel II), Bill Payne and Bryce Mortlock, the class has been sailed in Australia for over 50 years, and is one of the few senior classes that were designed within Australia.

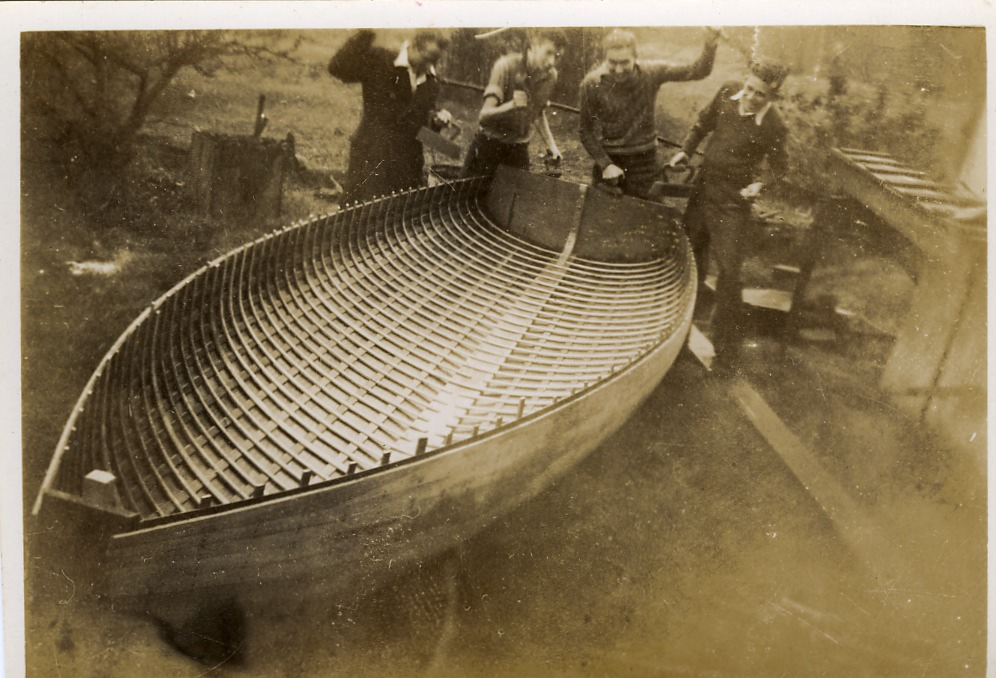
Bryce Mortlock (third from left) and Alan Payne (right) constructing the canoe.

The designers started work on designing a two-man sailing boat in 1938, completing the first vessel, "Willy's Canoe", in 1946. From there they increased the size of the hull, and the new class was introduced into Victoria through the Hobsons Bay Yacht Club. Subsequently, the class traveled to South Australia in the 1950s and was employed as one of four recognised classes that were being raced at the Brighton & Seacliff Yacht Club. Today the Brighton & Seacliff Yacht Club is the only place in Australia where regular races are still held.

The canoe was based on Uffa Fox's Brynhild design, and possesses a sleek hull with two hiking planks.
