= Short Tucano =

Series of military training aircraft

Tucano
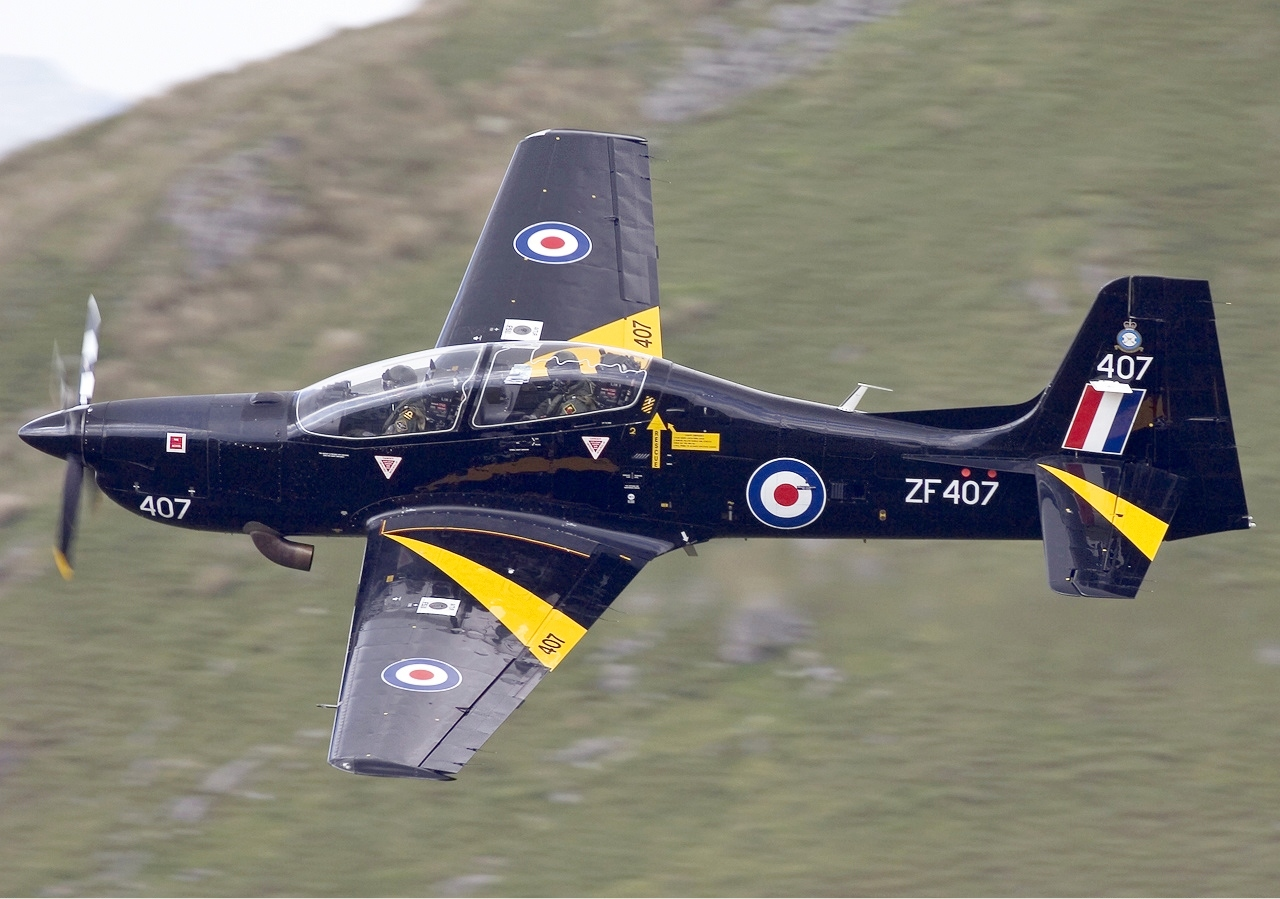
- RAF Short Tucano T1, in display colours for 2008

General information
- Type: Trainer aircraft
- National origin: United Kingdom
- Manufacturer: Short Brothers
- Status: In limited service
- Primary users: Royal Air Force (Retired) Kenya Air Force; Kuwait Air Force
- Number built: 160

History
- Manufactured: 1986–1995
- Introduction date: 1989
- First flight: 14 February 1986
- Retired: 2019 (Royal Air Force)
- Developed from: Embraer EMB 312 Tucano

The Short Tucano is a two-seat turboprop basic trainer built by Short Brothers in Belfast, Northern Ireland. It is a licence-built version of the Brazilian Embraer EMB 312 Tucano.

On 14 February 1986, the prototype conducted its maiden flight in Brazil before being delivered to Shorts to be used as a pattern aircraft and modified to meet Royal Air Force (RAF) requirements and used for trials and demonstrations. The first Short-assembled aircraft flew on 30 December 1986; deliveries to the RAF commenced during June 1988. The final example of the type was completed in 1995. Maintenance and support of the RAF's Tucano fleet was typically outsourced to several private companies.

The RAF was the Tucano's primary operator, although export sales have been achieved with the nations of Kenya and Kuwait. A handful have also been purchased and piloted by private individuals. On 25 October 2019, the Tucano was withdrawn from RAF service and was replaced by the Beechcraft T-6Cs.

== Design and development ==
=== Origins ===
Development of the Short Tucano commenced in May 1984, following an agreement between Brazilian aircraft manufacturer Embraer and Northern Ireland aviation firm Short Brothers to collaborate on a response to an outstanding British requirement, which sought a replacement for the aging BAC Jet Provost basic trainer for the Royal Air Force (RAF). For this purpose, the RAF had issued Air Staff Target 412, defining the performance criteria it desired for a new high-performance turboprop-powered basic trainer. A short list was compiled of various aircraft that had been submitted in response; other than the Tucano, the types considered were the Swiss Pilatus PC-9, the British NDN-1T Turbo-Firecracker and the Australian Aircraft Consortium's (AAC) A.20 Wamira II.

During 1984, Embraer dispatched the seventh EMB-312 airframe off the production line to Shorts, where it received numerous modifications in order to meet the AST-412 requirements. During September 1984, this same aircraft was displayed at the Farnborough Airshow; by this point, it had been equipped with an uprated PT6A-25C2 engine and a ventral air brake, which reportedly enabled the Tucano to achieve the required stall speed of 60 kn. However, tests undertaken at MOD Boscombe Down later on that year indicated the need to re-engine the aircraft in order to satisfy the RAF's requirement for time to height; accordingly, the Garrett TPE331 was selected.

On 21 March 1985, the Short Tucano proposal was declared the winner of the AST.412, receiving a contract worth £126 million for the provision of 130 aircraft, along with an option for a further 15; this option was never taken up. The first flight of the prototype EMB-312G2, which was furnished with a four-bladed Hartzell propeller and the Garrett TPE331-10 engine, took place in Brazil on 14 February of the following year. Shortly afterwards, this aircraft was disassembled and airlifted to Short's Belfast facility on 29 March 1986, where it was reassembled and returned to the skies just ten days later. During June of that year, the TPE331-10 engine was replaced by the improved TPE331-12B, with a major difference being the integration of an Electronic Engine Controller (EEC) system.

=== Production ===
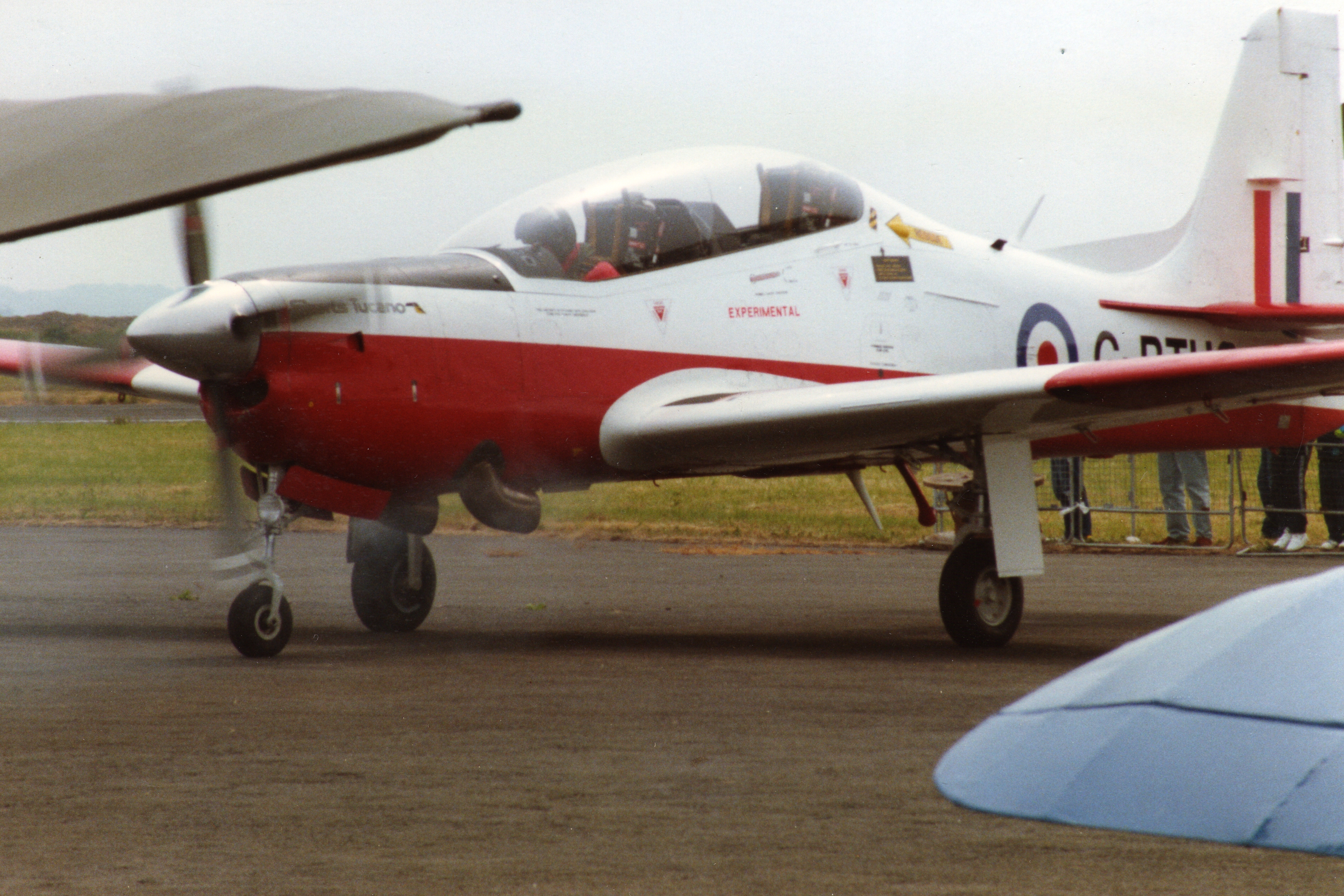
Short-operated prototype, 1991

On 30 December 1986, the first standard production model Tucano T.Mk 1 was flown; its official rollout took place on 20 January 1987. On 10 March 1987, the second aircraft made its first flight, and, by April, a third Tucano had joined the test fleet for clearance and final testing, which was largely undertaken at MOD Boscombe Down. The fourth aircraft to be built was the first delivered to the RAF on 16 June 1988 at the Central Flying School. Deliveries would continue to the RAF for another five years, the final aircraft arriving on 25 January 1993.

In addition to the sizable order for the RAF, multiple export customers emerged for the Shorts-produced Tucanos. The Kenyan Air Force ordered a total of 12 units while a further 16 Tucanos were exported to Kuwait. Those Tucanos delivered to the Kenyan Air Force were combat-capable; they were armed for the purposes of both weapons training and light attack duties; both export aircraft variants are fitted with four hard points, each capable of mounting various rocket pods, cannons, bombs, and external fuel tanks.

Due to its Garrett engine, the Short Tucano is more responsive to thrust changes and is somewhat noisier than the original Tucano. In addition to the revised engine, the major differences of the Short Tucano are a strengthened airframe for an improved fatigue life, a cockpit layout similar to the RAF's Hawk advanced trainer, a revised oxygen system, a flight data recorder, a four-bladed propeller, ventral airbrake and restyled wingtips. Two Martin-Baker MB 8LC ejection seats are used and the canopy was modified to meet the RAF's bird strike requirements. During its production run, Shorts commonly promoted the airframe as being "100% British-built". In order to meet RAF requirements, the EMB-312 has some 900 modifications, which reduces its commonality with the original aircraft to roughly 20% of its content.

== Operational history ==
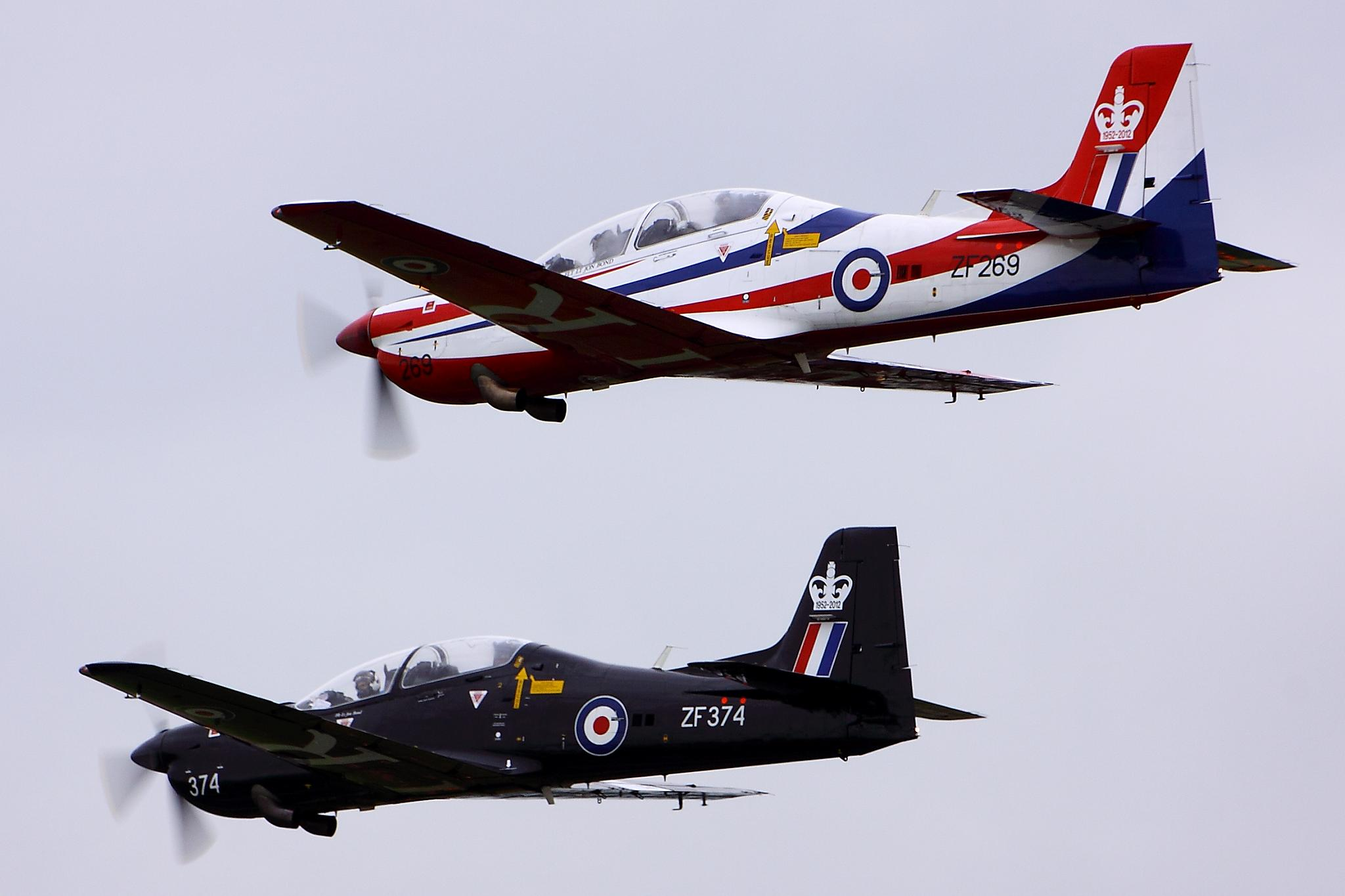
A pair of Tucanos in-flight at the 2012 Royal International Air Tattoo

During June 1988, the first Tucano deliveries were made to the RAF; induction of the type commenced thereafter. The type has been principally operated by No. 1 Flying Training School, based at RAF Linton-on-Ouse, where it has been used to provide basic fast-jet flying training to RAF and RN student pilots, on 72 (Reserve) Squadron. Typically, student pilots would fly around 130 hours during their training course on the Tucano before progressing to the jet-powered Hawk T2 aircraft, based at RAF Valley.

"For the price of one Eurofighter we could have a squadron of Super Tucanos. They can carry the same ordnance as a Harrier, with its loud bang, but unlike the Harrier, which can be over the battlefield for no more than 20 minutes, Tucanos can loiter overhead for hours on end, ready for use in a ground attack at a moment’s notice."

— House of Commons debate, October 2007.

The Short Tucano succeeded the BAC Jet Provost as the basic trainer for the RAF, preparing the student pilots for progression to the Hawk T1 advanced trainer aircraft. Following its introduction, the Tucano had reportedly proven to be roughly 70% cheaper to operate than its predecessor. The Tucano's accident record has also been remarkably better than other ab-initio training aircraft, with only five aircraft written off with no fatalities in over 20 years.

In March 2007, while discussing the British military contribution to the War in Afghanistan, the British Parliament discussed the concept of replacing the region's detachment of RAF Harriers and Tornados, which were being used to provide close air support to Allied forces, with a number of armed Short Tucanos, which would be re-roled as a dedicated counter-insurgency asset. Such use would have required extensive modifications to the RAF aircraft, as they were not fitted with underwing hard points for mounting armaments and equipment upon. Air Chief Marshal Stephen Dalton was dismissive of this suggested use of the Tucano, stating that it would cost lives amongst those on the ground and damage Britain's credibility and influence within the coalition forces in Afghanistan, and criticising its lack of operational flexibility.

The RAF's Tucanos have been typically maintained by private companies, defence firm VT Group operated one such support contract during the early 2010s. During July 2008, the Tucano's envisioned retirement date was moved from 2010 to around 2012, although further extension seemed likely. At one point, Shorts with Marshall Aerospace as their contractor championed the concept of upgrading the Tucano fleet as an inexpensive means of meeting the RAF's future basic trainer requirements. The prospective upgrade introduced a 'glass' cockpit with HUD, a number of aerodynamic refinements which along with minor engine upgrades, Shorts analysis showed could raise that the max. SL speed to over 300kts. This and gains in time to climb, moved it closer to the Pilatus PC21 capability. The concept development was funded by MoD but was ultimately dismissed as not being cost-effective.

By 2010, the Tucano fleet was scheduled to be withdrawn from RAF service in 2015, at which point it was to have been replaced by the winner of the UK Military Flying Training System (UKMFTS) programme. However, the type's out of service date was put back to Oct. 2019; the last of the Beechcraft T-6Cs, the Tucano's direct replacement, was delivered to RAF Valley on 3 December 2018.

On 25 October 2019, the Tucano was withdrawn from RAF service; to mark the type's retirement, an aerial display was performed at RAF Linton-on-Ouse, North Yorkshire, which was also set for closure. The last Shorts Tucano operational flight was completed with the first production aircraft ZF135.

== Accidents and incidents ==
On 22 Feb 1990, the first export Tucano Mk 51 ZH203 (destined for Kenya) crashed near Rathlin Island due to tailplane flutter in high speed weapons carriage trials, killing Shorts chief test pilot Allan Deacon, who ejected but drowned.

The RAF lost five aircraft in service, all non-fatal (four involved ejections): ZF316 on 12 May 1992, ZF270 on 13 May 1996, ZF293 on 22 Aug 2000, ZF344 on 12 Mar 2009 and ZF349 on 8 Jan 2013.

On 22 June 2015, movie soundtrack composer James Horner died when the Tucano he was piloting crashed in central California in a remote region of the Los Padres National Forest about 60 miles (97 km) north of Santa Barbara. Horner was the sole occupant of the plane.

== Variants ==
Tucano T1
Two-seat basic trainer for the RAF – 130 delivered (one other aircraft (T42) was severely damaged by an IRA bomb blast whilst in final assembly in 1990 and was subsequently sold privately to the USA in 2013 by Shorts).
Tucano Mk.51
Export version for Kenya – 12 delivered (13 were flown as the first was lost - see above).
Tucano Mk.52
Export version for Kuwait – 16 delivered.

== Operators ==
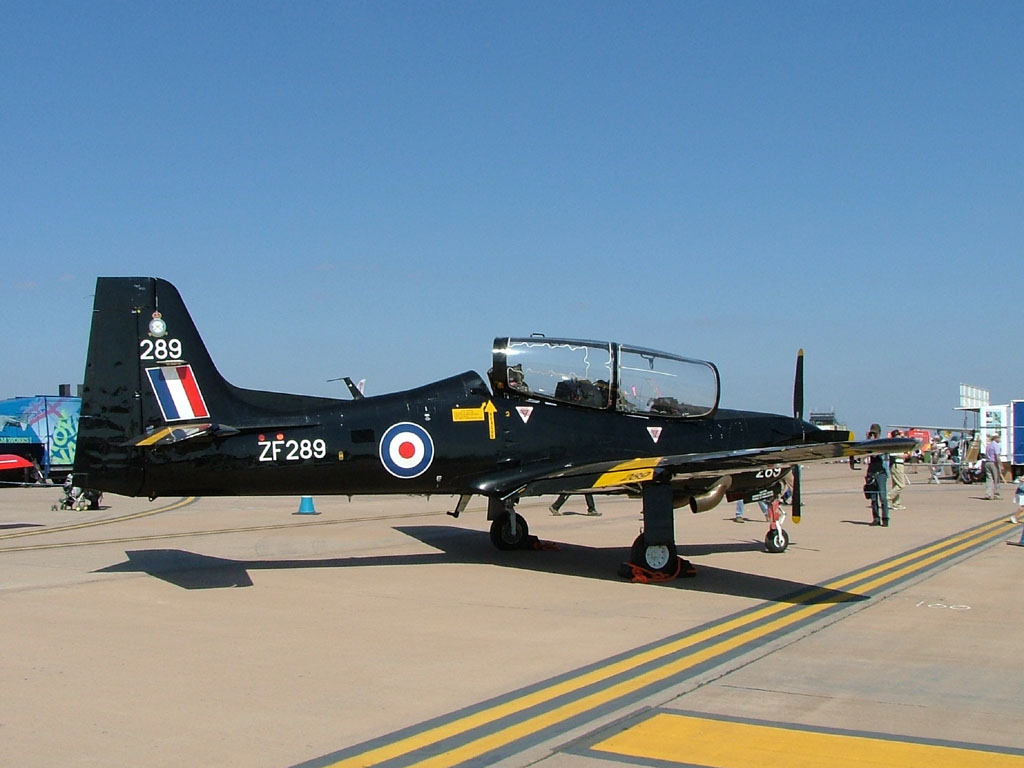
Short Tucano T1 at RIAT 2005

Kenya

- Kenya Air Force (1990 – present)
  - Flying Training School

=== Former operators ===
Kuwait

- Kuwait Air Force (1995 – 2025)
  - 19th Training Squadron (Grounded)

United Kingdom

- Empire Test Pilots' School
- Royal Air Force (June 1988 – October 2019)
  - No. 1 Flying Training School
    - No. 72 Squadron (July 2002 – October 2019)
    - No. 76 (Reserve) Squadron (May 2007 – May 2011)
    - No. 207 (Reserve) Squadron (July 2002 – January 2012)
  - No. 3 Flying Training School
  - No. 7 Flying Training School

== Aircraft on display ==
- G-BTUC Prototype Tucano T.1 at Ulster Aviation Society
- ZF167 Tucano T.1 at South Yorkshire Aircraft Museum, Doncaster
- ZF372 Tucano T.1 at Newark Air Museum, Newark on Trent
- ZF378 Tucano T.1 at Ulster Aviation Society, Northern Ireland
- ZF448 Tucano T.1 at Yorkshire Air Museum, Elvington

== Specifications (Tucano) ==
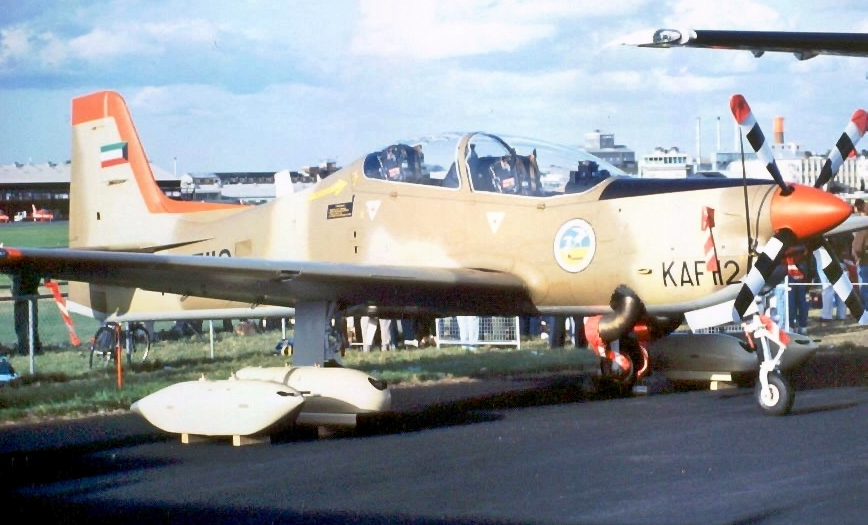
Kuwait Air Force Tucano Mk.52

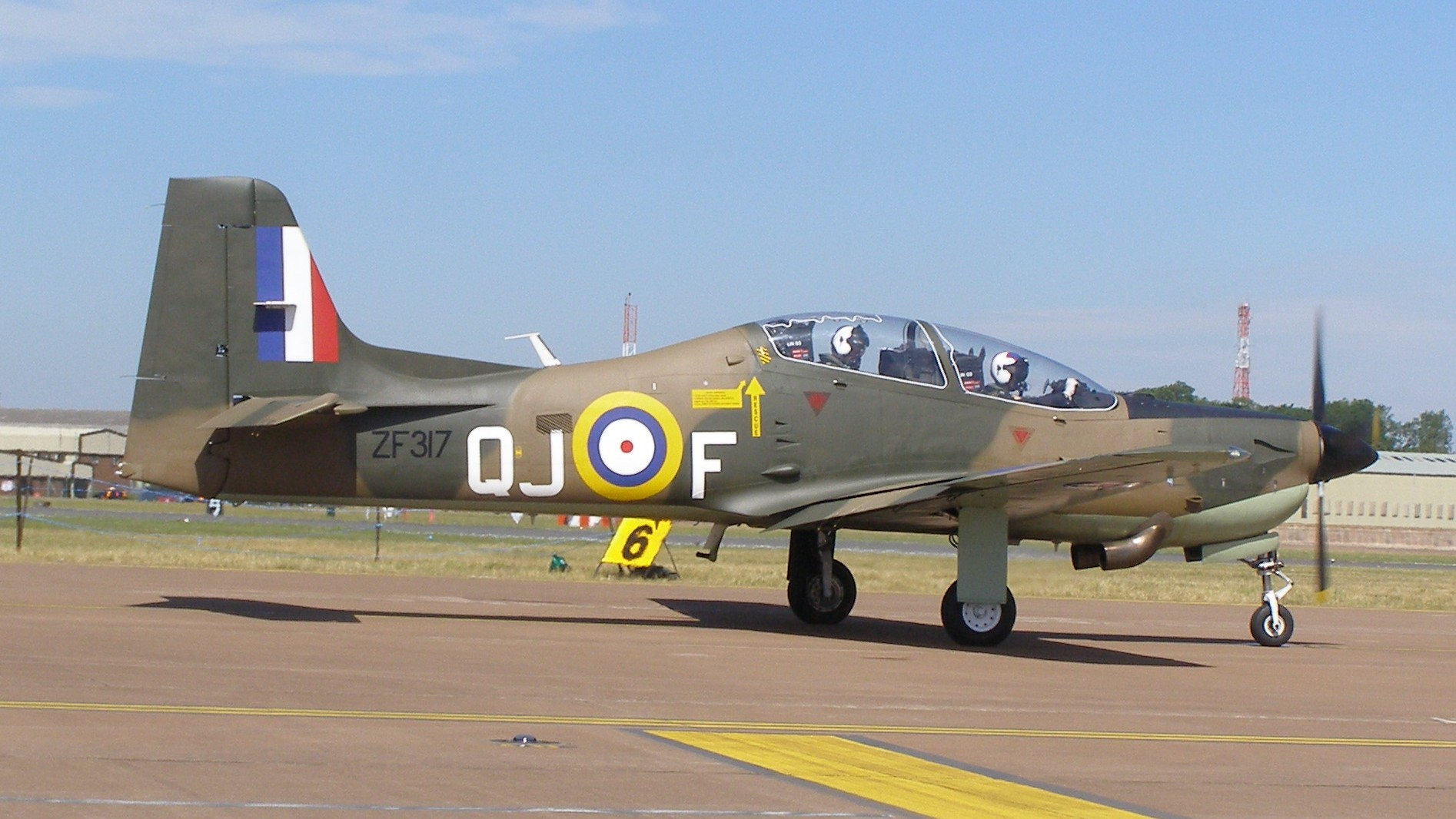
Royal Air Force Tucano in 2010 painted for the 70th Anniversary of the Battle of Britain to represent a Spitfire of No. 92 Squadron RAF as flown by Brian Kingcome in 1940

Data from Jane's All the World's Aircraft, 1988–1989 and Tucano T Mk 1 Aircrew Manual, 2015

General characteristics

- Crew: 2
- Length: 9.86 m (32 ft 4 in)
- Wingspan: 11.28 m (37 ft 0 in)
- Height: 3.40 m (11 ft 2 in)
- Wing area: 19.40 m^{2} (208.8 sq ft)
- Airfoil: NACA 63_{2}A-415 (root), 63A-212 (tip)
- Empty weight: 2,017 kg (4,447 lb)
- Max takeoff weight: 3,275 kg (7,220 lb)
- Fuel capacity: 724 L (159 imp gal; 191 US gal)
- Powerplant: 1 × Garrett TPE331-12B turboprop, 858 kW (1,151 shp)
- Propellers: 4-bladed Hartzell constant speed, fully feathering, aluminium, reversible-pitch propeller, 2.39 m (7 ft 10 in) diameter

Performance

- Maximum speed: 507 km/h (315 mph, 274 kn) at 3,000–4,600 m (10,000–15,000 ft)
- Cruise speed: 407 km/h (253 mph, 220 kn) at 6,100 m (20,000 ft) (econ. cruise)
- Stall speed: 80 km/h (50 mph, 43 kn) (flaps and gear down) (EAS)
- Never exceed speed: 518 km/h (322 mph, 280 kn) (EAS)
- Range: 1,665 km (1,035 mi, 899 nmi)
- Endurance: 5 h 12 min
- Service ceiling: 10,000 m (34,000 ft)
- g limits: +7/-3.6
- Rate of climb: 17.8 m/s (3,510 ft/min)
- Takeoff run to 15 m (50 ft): 524 m (1,719 ft)
- Landing run from 15 m (50 ft): 573 m (1,880 ft)

Armament

- Provision for 1,000 lb (454 kg) of stores on four underwing hardpoints, but not on RAF Tucanos

== See also ==
Related development

- Embraer EMB 312 Tucano
- Embraer EMB 314 Super Tucano

Aircraft of comparable role, configuration, and era

- Pilatus PC-7
- Pilatus PC-9
- PZL-130 Orlik
- T-6 Texan II

Related lists

- List of active United Kingdom military aircraft
