= AAC Wamira =

Australian Aircraft

Wamira

General information
- Type: Trainer aircraft
- Manufacturer: Australian Aircraft Consortium (Commonwealth Aircraft Corporation, Government Aircraft Factories and Hawker de Havilland)
- Status: Cancelled 1986
- Primary user: Royal Australian Air Force
- Number built: 0 (prototype incomplete)

The AAC Wamira was a turboprop military trainer aircraft, designed for the Royal Australian Air Force (RAAF) by the Australian Aircraft Consortium (AAC). The project was cancelled shortly before the first prototype was completed.

== Design and development ==
The story of the aircraft and its creators are interwoven, as AAC was set up expressly to design and build the aircraft. The consortium came into being in 1981, with its members being the three main aircraft manufacturers in Australia at that time—the Commonwealth Aircraft Corporation (CAC), the Government Aircraft Factories (GAF), and Hawker de Havilland (HdH). The RAAF, which expressed an intention to buy 69 aircraft, specified a turboprop trainer of a broadly conventional tricycle undercarriage low-wing layout, to be powered by a Pratt & Whitney Canada PT6A-25C engine. Unusually, however, its two seats were to be in a side-by-side configuration. The RAAF also specified that the type be fully aerobatic, be capable of cross-country navigation and weapons training, have a 200 knots (370 km/h) cruising speed at sea level, and have a minimum service life of 20 years and 8,000 flying hours. AAC signed a design and development contract in June 1982 and began work to produce an aircraft to meet the design criteria under the designation A10.

When it became clear that the aircraft as specified by the RAAF had limited appeal to other potential users, a version with the more usual tandem seating was designed, this being designated the A20; both models were named Wamira. A Memorandum of Understanding was signed with Westland Aircraft to establish a joint venture to market (and hopefully sell) the A20 in Europe. The A20 was subsequently entered in the competition to replace the Royal Air Force (RAF) fleet of BAC Jet Provosts, a competition eventually won by the Short Tucano. An engineering mockup (EMU) was produced in Australia consisting of stub wings and a fuselage from the fin fillet forward. Made from wood & alloy, it utilised real aircraft components such as ejection seats, control columns, rudder pedals, etc. and was shipped to the UK, appearing on the Westland stand at Farnborough '84. However, the Wamira was never a serious contender due to it being at the design stage whilst the other three contenders were flying aircraft.

By the time the RAF competition was lost, the whole Wamira project was in doubt. This was partly due to delays in completing the prototype, but mainly due to huge cost overruns. At the time, the RAAF was replacing its front-line fighter fleet and wanted an Airborne Early Warning platform and inflight refuelling aircraft to enhance the new type's capabilities, and an Auditor-General report found that the Wamira project cost was likely to be more than double that originally estimated. In July 1985 it was announced that the RAAF trainer requirement was now a competition, and that the Short Tucano, Pilatus PC-7 and PC-9 (all of which had tandem seating) would be considered as well as the Wamira. The same month CAC was absorbed by HdH, meaning that HdH now had a two-thirds share in AAC and quickly became sole owner of the Wamira project when it bought GAF's share. On 16 December 1985, the Pilatus PC-9 was announced as the winner of the competition, and the Wamira project was cancelled. The HdH partners were later jointly responsible for licence-production of the PC-9.

Endeavour Aerospace acquired the Wamira design and associated rights from the Australian government in 2000. The aircraft design was subsequently renamed Phoenix, with Endeavour proposing variants with either side-by-side or tandem seating. Endeavour Aerospace believes that the design has potential in the general aviation market as a pilot trainer and recreation/sports/utility aircraft. The original drawings and design records have been kept in safe storage since being acquired.

The A-20 EMU resided at the Westland Helicopters Weston factory until 'Heseltine-gate' in 1986 closed the site. The EMU returned to Australia in 2012 via a group of enthusiasts who raised the funds for transport and fumigation. The A-20 EMU is now in storage at an aircraft restoration facility in the western suburbs of Melbourne awaiting a full overhaul.

== Variants ==
- A10 - RAAF proposal, side seating
- A20 - RAF and international proposal, tandem seating

== Specifications (A.10 Wamira) ==
Data from World Trainer Directory and Jane's All the World's Aircraft

General characteristics

- Crew: two
- Length: 10.20 m (33 ft 6 in)
- Wingspan: 11.00 m (36 ft 1 in)
- Height: 3.51 m (11 ft 6 in)
- Wing area: 20.00 m^{2} (215.3 sq ft)
- Empty weight: 1,394 kg (3,073 lb)
- Gross weight: 2,200 kg (4,850 lb) (training role)
- Max takeoff weight: 2,800 kg (6,173 lb)
- Fuel capacity: 404 kg (891 lb)
- Powerplant: 1 × Pratt & Whitney Canada PT6A-25C turboprop, 560 kW (750 shp)
- Propellers: 3-bladed Constant-speed, feathering propeller, 2.29 m (7 ft 6 in) diameter

Performance

- Maximum speed: 460 km/h (290 mph, 250 kn) at 4,725 m (15500 ft)
- Cruise speed: 330 km/h (210 mph, 180 kn) at sea level
- Stall speed: 106 km/h (66 mph, 57 kn) (flaps down)
- Never exceed speed: 460 km/h (290 mph, 250 kn)
- Endurance: 3 hr (with 50 min reserves)
- Service ceiling: 9,700 m (31,800 ft)
- Rate of climb: 14.0 m/s (2,760 ft/min)
- Time to altitude: 10,000 ft (3,000 m) <6 minutes

Armament
4x underwing hardpoints, stressed for 250 kg (550 lb) each inboard and 150 kg (330 lb) each outboard

== See also ==
Aircraft of comparable role, configuration, and era

- Pilatus PC-7
- Pilatus PC-9
- Short Tucano
- NDN Firecracker
