= Columbia 7.6 =

Sailboat class

Development
- Designer: Alan Payne
- Location: United States
- Year: 1976
- Builders: Columbia Yachts; Hughes Boat Works; Aura Yachts
- Role: Cruiser

Boat
- Displacement: 4,500 lb (2,041 kg)
- Draft: 3.50 ft (1.07 m)

Hull
- Type: monohull
- Construction: fiberglass
- LOA: 25.08 ft (7.64 m)
- LWL: 20.67 ft (6.30 m)
- Beam: 9.17 ft (2.80 m)
- Engine: inboard motor

Hull appendages
- Keel: fin keel
- Ballast: 1,500 lb (680 kg)
- Rudder: transom-mounted rudder

Rig
- Rig type: Bermuda rig
- I foretriangle height: 33.00 ft (10.06 m)
- J foretriangle base: 10.70 ft (3.26 m)
- P mainsail luff: 28.00 ft (8.53 m)
- E mainsail foot: 9.80 ft (2.99 m)

Sails
- Sailplan: masthead sloop
- Mainsail area: 137.20 sq ft (12.746 m^{2})
- Jib/genoa area: 176.55 sq ft (16.402 m^{2})
- Total sail area: 313.75 sq ft (29.148 m^{2})

Racing
- PHRF: 228

The Columbia 7.6 is an American/Canadian trailerable sailboat that was designed by Australian Alan Payne as a cruiser and first built in 1976.

== Production ==
The design was built by Columbia Yachts, part of the Whittaker Corporation, in the United States and later by Hughes Boat Works and Aura Yachts in Canada, with production from 1976 to 1986. Some boats were supplied as kits for amateur construction.

== Design ==
The designer described the goals for the boat, "as with the other Supercruisers, the design was planned to suit the real and practical needs of America's cruising families. Consequently, the balance of qualities in the 7.6 retains the stability and controllability needed to give confidence and security in strong winds and rough seas, while the lines have been adjusted to suit smooth waters and light breezes. In the design, we have used wide beam and a heavy, well-placed chunk of ballast, which assures the stability. The bow and stern shapes have been carefully studied so as to produce a boat that doesn't fight the helmsman with a strong steering bias when heeled, and this quality is the principal factor in the boat's obedience. Under full sail, the boat is lively in a light breeze, but she is also quite happy with the smaller jib in a freshening breeze, or in a real gale with sail reduced to the reefed mainsail only. A special characteristic of the boat is that the skeg hull form, adopted to contribute to good sailing performance, also provides an accessible location for an inboard engine, where it does not intrude into the cabin."

The Columbia 7.6 is a recreational keelboat, built predominantly of fiberglass, with wood trim. It has a masthead sloop rig, a raked stem an angled transom, a transom-hung rudder controlled by a tiller and a fixed fin keel. It displaces 4,500 lb (2,041 kg) and carries 1,500 lb (680 kg) of ballast.

The boat has a draft of 3.50 ft (1.07 m) with the standard keel.

The boat is normally fitted with a small 6 to 10 hp (4 to 7 kW) outboard motor for docking and maneuvering. A Japanese Yanmar inboard diesel motor was a factory option.

The design has sleeping accommodation for four people, with a double "V"-berth in the bow cabin and a straight settee on the port side in the main cabin that can convert into a double berth. The galley is located on the starboard side just forward of the companionway ladder is equipped with a two-burner stove and a sink. An ice box is located on the port side opposite the galley. The head is located just aft of the bow cabin and includes a hanging locker. The fresh water tank has a capacity of 16 U.S. gallons (61 L; 13 imp gal). Cabin headroom is 68 in (170 cm).

The design has a PHRF racing average handicap of 228 and a hull speed of 6.1 kn (11.3 km/h).

== Operational history ==
In a 2010 review Steve Henkel wrote, "a sales brochure calls her a 'wide-body supercruiser,' but that seems an exaggeration: her 'wide body' beam (9' 2") is exceeded by 20 other boats ... and her [interior space] is respectable for her length but not extraordinary ... Best features: We see no special features that distinguish this vessel from her comp[etitor]s. Worst features: We would guess that the 7.6's stability may he slightly lower than her comps due to her lower ballast. Workmanship may vary considerably depending on the builder at any given time—especially among the individuals building kit boats."

== See also ==
- List of sailing boat types
