= Government Aircraft Factories =

Defunct Australian state-owned aircraft manufacturer

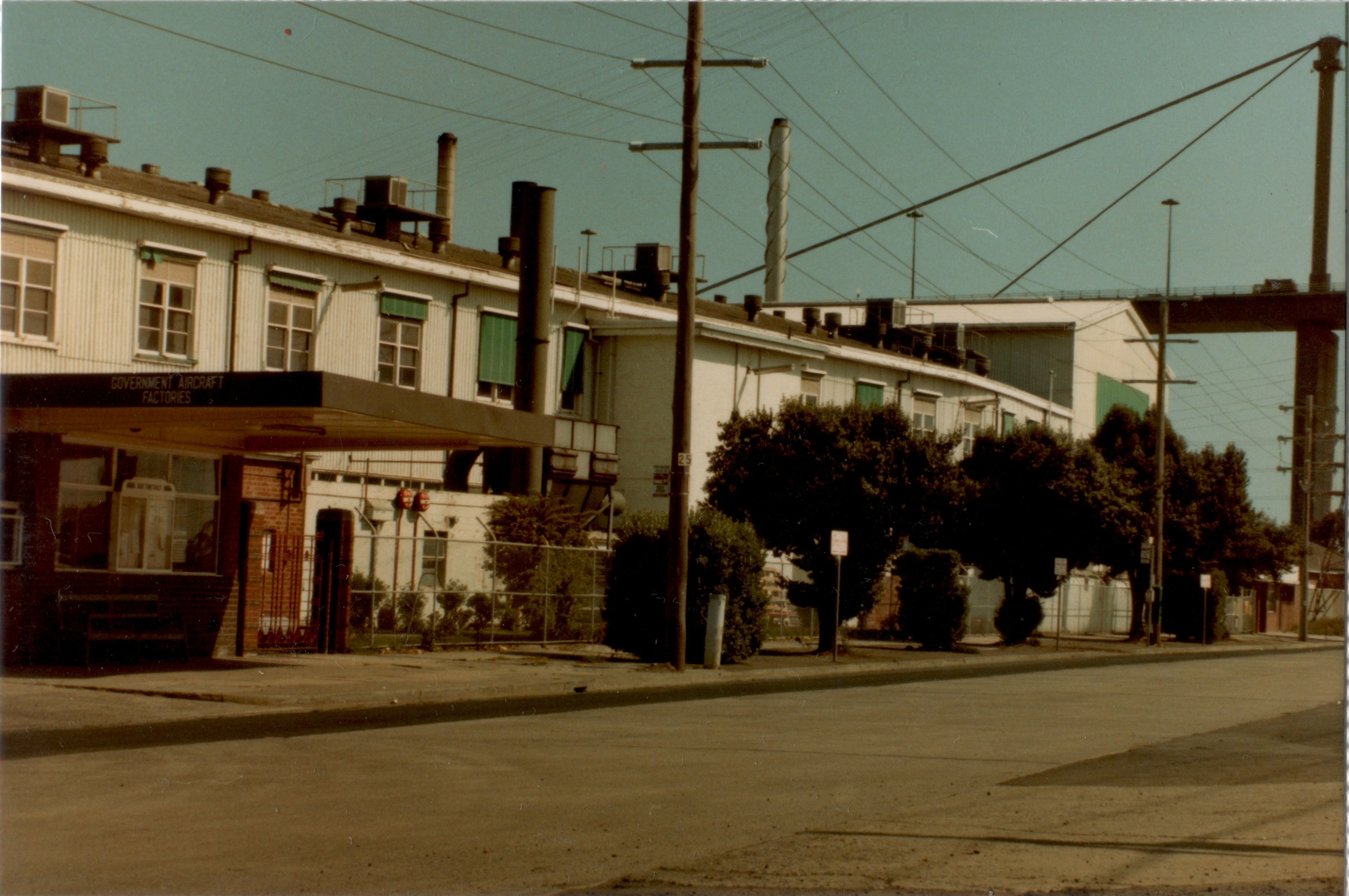
- Main entrance to the Government Aircraft Factories at Fishermans Bend in 1985
- Type: Aircraft manufacturing
- Industry: Aviation
- Founded: 1 July 1939; 87 years ago
- Fate: Incorporated as ASTA and ultimately acquired by Boeing Australia
- Headquarters: Port Melbourne, Australia
- Products: GAF Jindivik; GAF Nomad
- Parent: Government of Australia

Government Aircraft Factories (GAF) was the name of an aircraft manufacturer owned by the Government of Australia. The primary factory was located at Fishermans Bend, a suburb of Melbourne in Victoria. It had its origins in the lead-up to World War II, during which it was known as the Department of Aircraft Production (DAP). In 1987, GAF was reorganised and renamed as Aerospace Technologies of Australia (ASTA), then privatised. ASTA was purchased by Rockwell International, that was in turn purchased by Boeing a few years later. ASTA subsequently formed the nucleus of Boeing Aerostructures Australia, a subsidiary of Boeing Australia.

== History ==
=== World War II ===
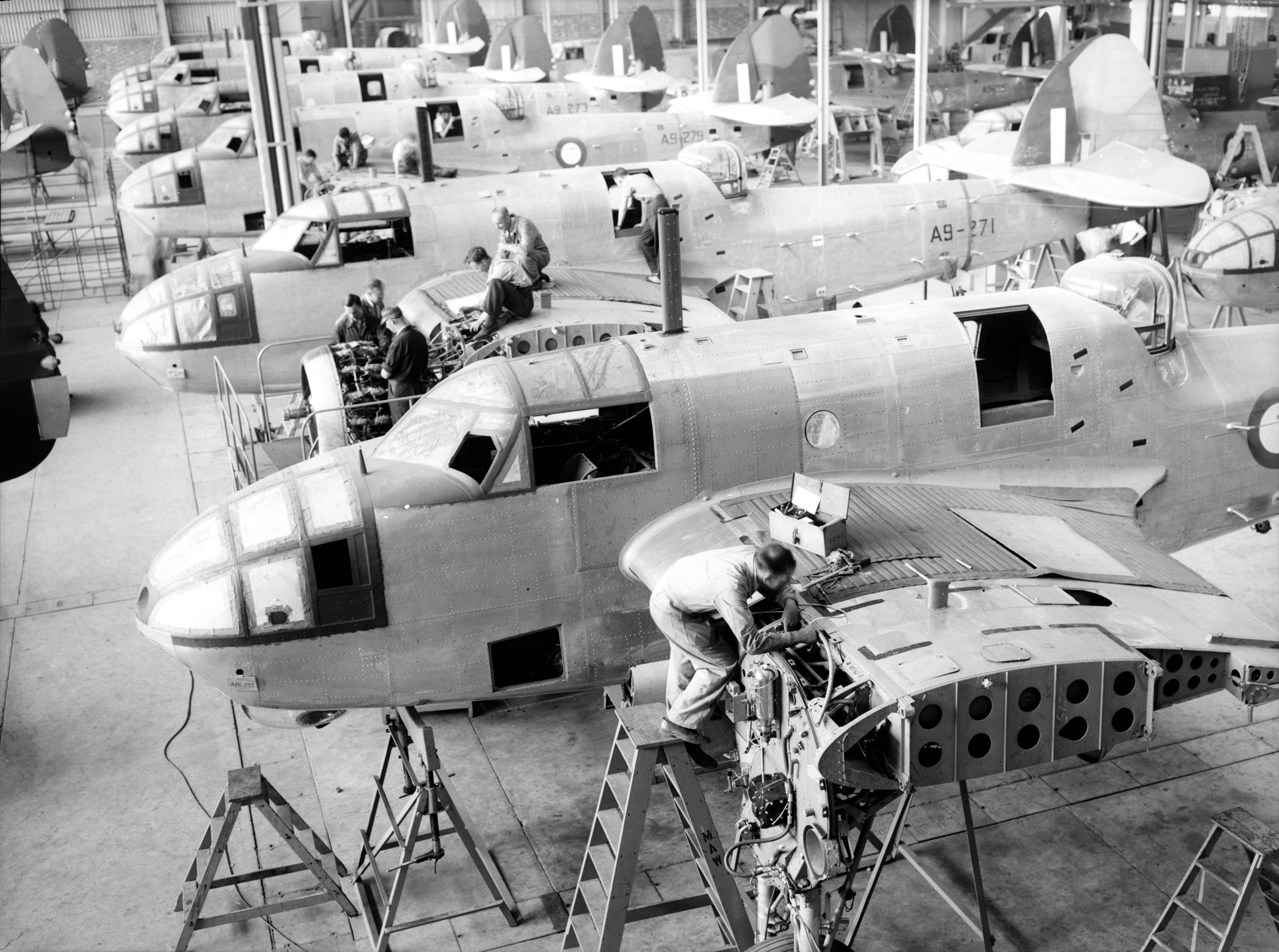
Bristol Beaufort production at DAP Australia c. 1943.

The entity was established just before the outbreak of World War II when the Australian government recognised that supplies of aircraft from traditional sources could no longer be assured. To ensure supply of aircraft, in 1939 the government set up the new Department of Supply and Development with an Aircraft Construction Branch within that department; both organisations officially came into being on 1 July 1939. The organisation was set up specifically to produce the Bristol Beaufort under licence in Australia. After an evaluation process to assess the operational needs of the Royal Australian Air Force (RAAF), a British Air Mission sent to Australia recommended that the Beaufort be manufactured for delivery to both the RAAF and the Royal Air Force (RAF).

It is noteworthy that at this stage (mid-1939) an Australian aircraft industry barely existed. The private-enterprise Commonwealth Aircraft Corporation had by that time completed three of its first product, the Wirraway, and was in the process of building the prototype of its second type, the Wackett. Both of these were single-engined aircraft and the Wackett was not an advanced design by any criterion. The other major aircraft manufacturer, de Havilland Australia, had up to that time mainly assembled aircraft manufactured by its parent company imported into Australia as parts, commencing the delivery of 20 Tiger Moths, built from imported fuselages and locally manufactured wings, to the RAAF in May 1939. Total production in Australia to mid-1939 of all types of aircraft was certainly less than 100, and may have been less than seventy. Many of these were 'one-offs' and the vast majority were of 'wood-and-fabric' construction like the Tiger Moth. By contrast the Beaufort was a large twin-engined all-metal aircraft of advanced design for the time.

An initial order for 180 Beauforts was placed in July 1939, for delivery in equal numbers to the RAAF and RAF. By the time the first aircraft was delivered, the organisation responsible for its manufacture had undergone several changes. In March 1940 the Aircraft Construction Branch was renamed the Aircraft Production Commission. Three months later oversight responsibility was removed from the Minister for Supply and Development to the Minister for Munitions. In June 1941 (by which time production work had begun) the Aircraft Production Commission was removed from the Department of Supply and Development, placed within the newly created Department of Aircraft Production (DAP) and was soon after renamed the Aircraft Advisory Committee for the Co-ordination of Aircraft Production with the actual aircraft manufacturer being constituted as the Beaufort Division, usually referred to as the Beaufort Division of the DAP.

As the Australian-built Beaufort was to be fitted with Pratt & Whitney R-1830 engines instead of the Bristol Taurus originally installed, the aircraft required several design changes, this partially accounting for the delay between the initial order and the first flight of the first aircraft in August 1941 (a Bristol-built aircraft had earlier been delivered to Australia and modified, flying with R-1830s for three months prior to this). Another reason for the delay was that various other parts of the aircraft (such as the undercarriage legs) were originally to come from Britain, but because of an embargo by the British Government on War Material after the Fall of France these had to be locally manufactured instead. One seemingly innocuous item caused major problems; no ball bearings were manufactured in Australia at the time, and so with none forthcoming from Britain a local substitute had to be found and incorporated into the design.

The original intention was that the first 90 aircraft would be delivered to the RAF; in the event only six were delivered to that air arm, although 59 were assigned RAF registrations in the T95xx and T96xx serial number blocks. The flight of the first Australian-built aircraft was the culmination of efforts by over 600 different companies and organisations - the Beaufort Division being more-or-less responsible for only final assembly, with only wing centre-sections of some aircraft being manufactured 'in-house' at Fishermans Bend, gun turrets being manufactured at Fairfield, Victoria, and final assembly on two lines; at Fishermans Bend and at Mascot. Major assemblies were manufactured by the Chullora Railway Workshops in Sydney, Newport Workshops in Melbourne and Islington Railway Workshops in Adelaide, and at the General Motors Holden factory in Woodville, South Australia. A total of 700 Beauforts had been built (a figure exceeded only by those for the Wirraway and Tiger Moth among Australian-built aircraft) when production ended in August 1944; by which time the main manufacturing effort had already turned to licence production of the Bristol Beaufighter.

Beaufighter production proceeded more smoothly than its forebear, as might be expected when the same sub-contracting companies took part in both programmes. The RAAF had considered the type as early as February 1939 and placed an initial order in June that year, before the prototype had even flown. The same supply problems that delayed the Beaufort ended any chance of the RAAF acquiring Beaufighters for the time being, and it wasn't until the end of 1942 that plans began to be laid for Beaufighter production. The Australian Government gave the go-ahead for manufacture of 350 Beaufighters on 30 January 1943 and preparations got underway in earnest. As the supply of engines from Britain was still uncertain at that time, a Bristol-built aircraft was re-engined with Wright GR-2600 Cyclones as insurance; in the event all Australian-built Beaufighters were fitted with imported Bristol Hercules engines. The first DAP Beaufighter flew for the first time on 26 May 1944 and production and deliveries slightly overlapped those of Beauforts, with the first two dozen Beaufighters being built and delivered concurrently with the last fifty-or-so Beauforts. Orders were increased to 450 but with the end of the War the programme was terminated after 365 had been built, with another 21 partially built airframes not delivered.

=== Postwar operations ===
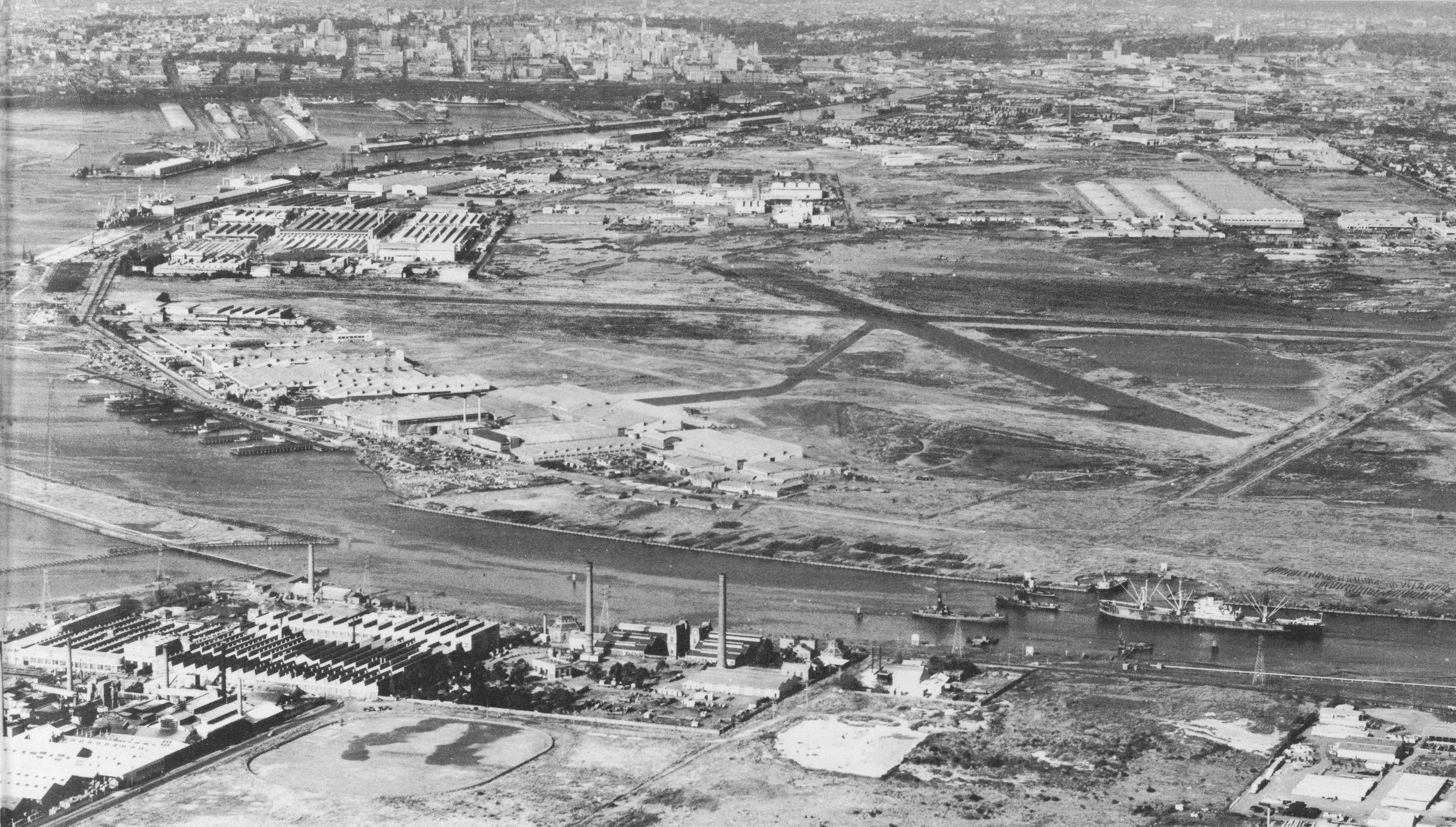
Aerial view of GAF along the Yarra River showing the taxiway between the back of the factory and the Fishermans Bend runway c. 1954

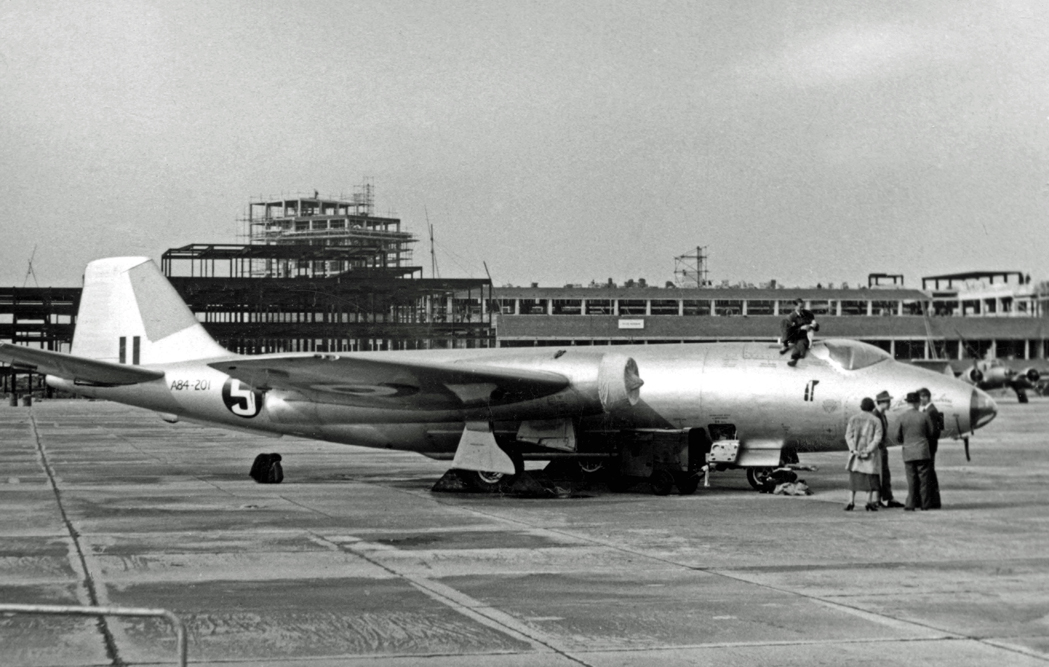
GAF-built Canberra B.20 of the RAAF at London Heathrow in October 1953 before the start of the England-New Zealand air race

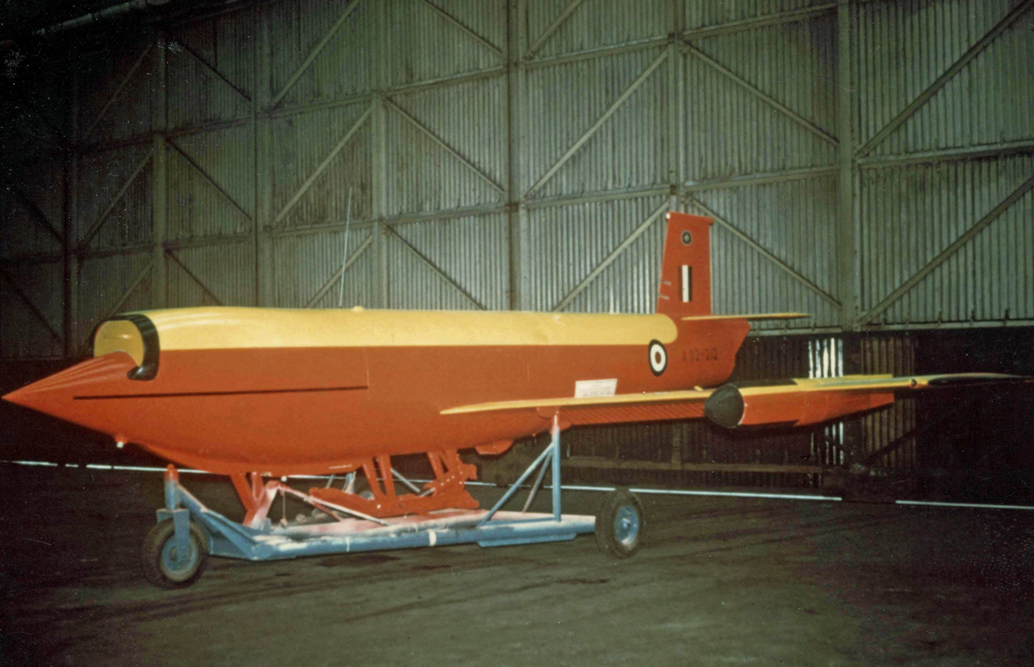
GAF Jindivik target drone after assembly by Fairey Aviation in the UK in 1961

After the end of the Second World War came a scaling back of the Australian aviation industry, with the number of employees in Australia as a whole being reduced by 90%. In the case of the DAP there was also a reorganisation, the result of which was another name change, the longest-lasting and the one by which the organisation would be best-known - the Government Aircraft Factories (GAF).

By the time of the reorganisation, preparations for production of the next type to emerge from the GAF were well underway. This was a version of the Avro Lincoln bomber. The Lincoln B.30 had an extended nose to accommodate two additional crew members and search radar and was used in the bombing and maritime reconnaissance roles. The initial five aircraft were largely assembled from Avro-built components and the first flew on 17 March 1946. A further 68 machines were completely built by the GAF.

From 1953, the GAF built 48 English Electric Canberra twin-jet tactical bombers under licence. These aircraft were of the uprated B.20 type with extra range capability. Many served in the RAAFs contribution of forces in the war in Vietnam and some were later converted to T.21 operational training standard.

In 1958 the GAF responded to the emerging need for a high performance jet-powered radio controlled target drone by designing the GAF Jindivik in collaboration with aerospace firms in the United Kingdom. It was powered by a Viper jet engine and could be recovered after flight by landing on skids. It served into the 1960s with Australian and United Kingdom military and government entities.

=== Demise ===
In 1987, the Government Aircraft Factories was reorganised and renamed as Aerospace Technologies of Australia (ASTA). In June 1995 ASTA was privatised, with the sale proceeds returning $40 million to the Commonwealth. Aerospace Technologies of Australia is now part of Boeing Australia.

== Products ==
- Bristol Beaufort bomber
- Bristol Beaufighter multi-role fighter
- Avro Lincoln bomber
- English Electric Canberra jet bomber
- GAF Pika manned drone
- GAF Jindivik remote-controlled drone
- Malkara missile
- Ikara missile
- GAF Turana drone
- Dassault Mirage III jet fighter
- GAF Nomad STOL aircraft / trainer
- McDonnell Douglas F/A-18 Hornet jet fighter - 73 were assembled from parts provided by McDonnell Douglas (first two were built in US)
- AAC Wamira trainer
