= Boeing Australia =

Australian aerospace company

Boeing Australia Holdings Pty Ltd
- Type: Division
- Industry: Aerospace and defence
- Founded: 1997
- Headquarters: Brisbane, Australia
- Key people: Maria Fernandez (president)
- Products: Commercial airliners Military aircraft Munitions; Aerospace Support; Simulation; Operations and Maintenance; Computer Services
- Number of employees: >4,500 (2025)
- Parent: Boeing
- Website: Boeing.com.au

Boeing Australia is Boeing's largest subdivision outside the United States. Established in 1997, the company oversees its seven wholly owned subsidiaries, consolidating and co-ordinating Boeing's businesses and operations in Australia.

Boeing has played a role in Australia's aerospace industry through its products and services and has more than 4,500 employees spread across 38 locations in every state and territory except Tasmania. With an investment of more than $800 million, Boeing generates approximately $400 million in export revenue for Australia through its commercial and defence products and services.

== History of Boeing in Australia ==
=== Origins ===
Boeing began working in Australia through its subsidiary Boeing Aerostructures Australia (BAA), which was formerly known as the de Havilland Australia Company (DHA) and established in 1927. DHA became Hawker de Havilland Australia (HdH) in 1961 and acquired the former Commonwealth Aircraft Corporation (CAC) in 1986. Boeing acquired HdH in 2000 which became Boeing Aerostructures Australia (BAA).

Meanwhile, the Department of Aircraft Production (DAP) was established by the Government of Australia in 1939 next to CAC and renamed as Government Aircraft Factories (GAF) in 1939. In 1987, GAF was reorganised and renamed as Aerospace Technologies of Australia (ASTA), then privatised and later purchased in 1995 by Rockwell International. In 1996 Boeing purchased Rockwell International and Rockwell Australia became Boeing Australia in 1996. In 1997, Boeing bought Aerospace Technologies of Australia, which until the 1980s was known as Government Aircraft Factories. The five remaining subsidiaries were acquired as follows: Jeppesen in 2000, Alteon in 2002, Aviall in 2006, and Insitu Pacific in 2009.

In 2012, Boeing Australia closed a Bankstown factory in Sydney with operations consolidated commercial manufacturing operations at Fishermans Bend in Melbourne.

=== Relationship with Boeing Enterprise Divisions ===
Boeing Australia covers all of Boeing's major divisions:

- Boeing Commercial Airplanes (BCA)
  - Composite manufacturing is performed by Boeing Aerostructures Australia (BAA) in Port Melbourne.
  - Sales support is performed by Boeing Distribution Australia in Sydney.
- Boeing Defense, Space & Security (BDS)
  - Networks, communications and mission systems for the Commonwealth of Australia and Australian Defence Force by Boeing Defence Australia (BDA) based in Brisbane.
  - Boeing MQ-28 Ghost Bat development and manufacturing by BAA, and operations and maintenance by BDA.
  - Boeing Phantom Works rapid prototyping by Phantom Works Australia (PW-A) (previously Phantom Works Global) in Brisbane.
  - Insitu Pacific based in Alderley, Queensland.
- Boeing Global Services (BGS)
  - Commercial aviation services provided by BAA, Alteon Training Australia, Aviall, Jeppesen Australia, and Jeppesen Marine.
  - Sustainment and training provided by BDA.

Boeing Australia also includes Boeing Research & Technology - Australia (BR&T-A) in two locations. The Melbourne Technology Centre focusing on composite materials and automated production systems is co-located with Boeing Aerostructures Australia. The Brisbane Technology Centre focusing on advanced autonomy, modelling, and simulation is co-located in The University of Queensland.

== Boeing Aerostructures Australia ==
BCA is also supported in Australia by Boeing Aerostructures Australia (BAA, formerly Hawker de Havilland, Government Aircraft Factories and Commonwealth Aircraft Corporation). BAA designs, tests, certifies and produces world class advanced structures. Despite predominantly commercial customers, BAA is also responsible for the design and manufacture of structures to the defence industry. Based at Melbourne's Fishermans Bend, the company has a long heritage in Australian aviation that began with its legacy companies in 1927 and has included the manufacture of aircraft which served in the Royal Australian Air Force during World War II.

BAA is Australia's only designer and manufacturer of advanced composite aerostructure components for commercial aircraft. Boeing Aerostructures Australia manufactures the 'moveable trailing edge' control surfaces of the Boeing 787 using a unique carbon fibre production technology developed in Victoria called resin infusion. This is Australia's largest aerospace contract valued at $5 billion over 20 years, and Fishermans Bend is the only Boeing location in the world to apply the unique resin infusion system that enables the components to be cured without a traditional autoclave. Boeing Aerostructures Australia has invested $70 million in site improvements to support 787 production increases over the next decade.

In addition to work on the 787 moveable trailing edge, Boeing Aerostructures Australia's over 1000 employees produce flight control products such as 737 rudders, winglets and sole source supply for ailerons, as well as Boeing 777 cove lip doors, elevators and rudders.

== Boeing Defence Australia ==
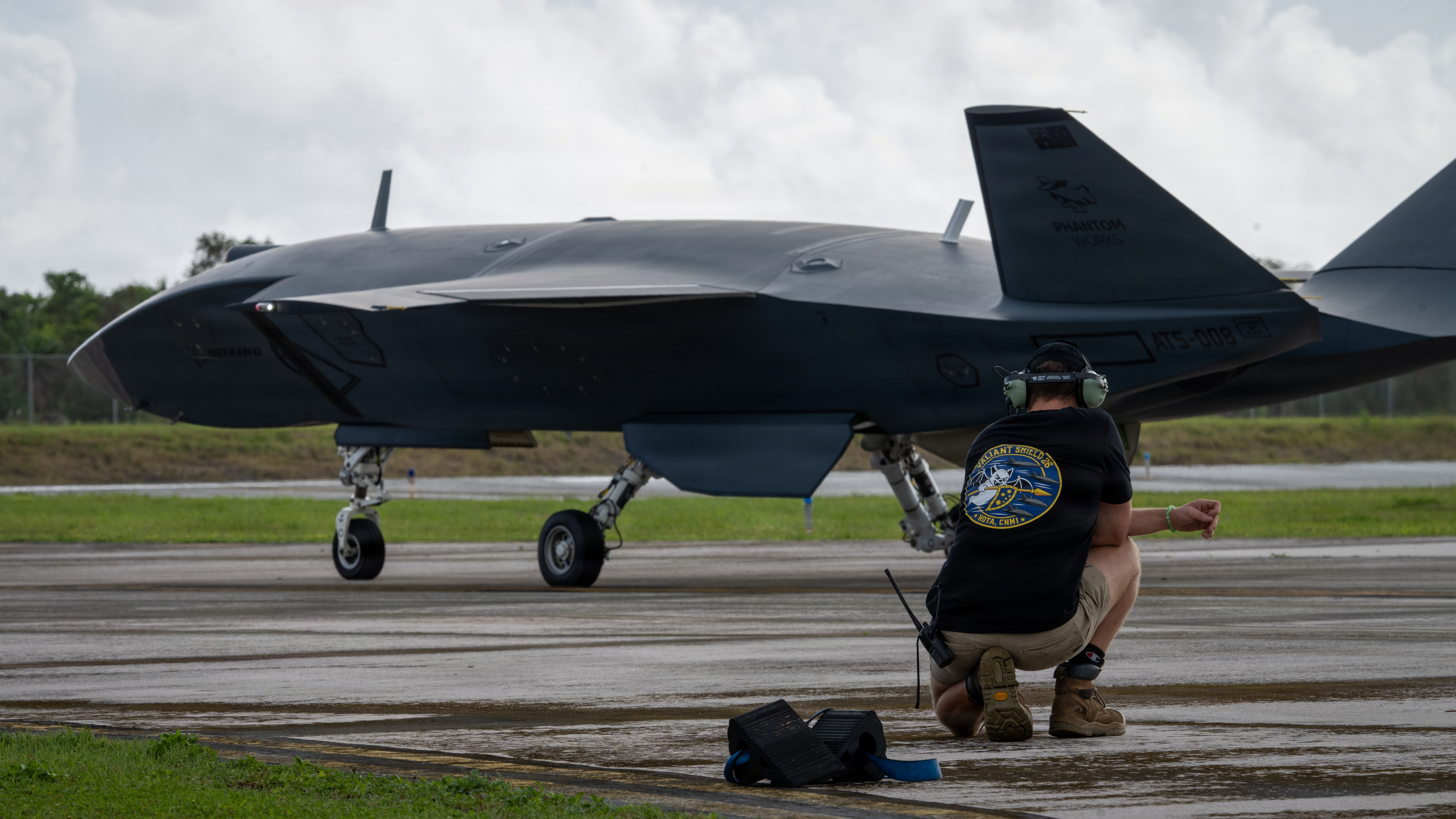
A Boeing Defence Australia employee with a Boeing MQ-28 Ghost Bat in 2026

Boeing Defense, Space & Security (BDS) products and services placed in or destined for Australia include:

- C-17 Globemaster III military transports,
- CH-47 Chinook helicopters,
- Boeing 737 Wedgetail AEW&C Wedgetail aircraft,
- F/A-18 Hornets,
- F/A-18F Super Hornets,
- aerospace support, such as F-111 Through Life Support and the F/A-18 Hornet Upgrade Program.
- delivery of 6th C-17 to Australia
- Army aviation training and training support,
- Harpoon missile,
- Joint Direct Attack Munitions,
- Network-enabled systems,
- Defence High Frequency Communication System (DHFCS),
- ScanEagle unmanned air vehicle (UAV), and
- Joint participation on the Wideband Global SATCOM (WGS) Satellite program with the U.S. Air Force.

In Australia, BDS is represented in by its business unit Boeing Defence Australia (BDA), which is a defence aerospace enterprise. BDA supports programs for the Commonwealth of Australia, the Australian Defence Force, and commercial customers. BDA also conducts operations and maintenance for classified programs and Australian Government sites, and operates in line with the three divisions of BDS - Boeing Military Aircraft, Global Services & Support, and Network & Space Systems.

== Boeing Distribution Australia ==
BCA Sales operates out of Boeing Australia's Sydney office and provides sales and marketing support of BCA products, customer engineering, and quality control/procurement functions.

BCA opened its first Australian office in Sydney in 1959 when Qantas became the first international customer for Boeing's first passenger jet, the Boeing 707, which changed air travel for Australians by drastically reducing flight times to the rest of the world. The Boeing 737 has also played an important role in the growth of aviation in Australia.

Another component of BCA is its Commercial Aviation Services (CAS) unit, which provides materials and engineering services to Boeing customers in-country. In Australia, Alteon Training Australia, Aviall, Jeppesen Australia, and Jeppesen Marine come under CAS' family of companies.

Boeing Field Service is also part of CAS. Field Service provides on-site technical advice to Boeing customers and can call resolve operator problems with access to BCA technical resources. Field Service representatives are located in Brisbane, Sydney, and Melbourne.

== Boeing Research and Technology ==
In September 2003, Boeing Company initiated with the University of Queensland School of IT and Electrical Engineering (ITEE) a new Boeing Systems Engineering Teaching Laboratory to fill skills shortages in aviation and aerospace industry in Australia. Boeing also made a $1.55M grant for the founding of a Boeing Professorship in Systems Engineering for 5 years occupied by Professor Peter A Lindsay. Boeing provided funding with respect to the Wedgetail 737 Airborne Early Warning and Control (AEW&C) project with the Commonwealth of Australia.

This fostered Defence Industries Queensland in Queensland Department of State Development, Infrastructure and Planning with Boeing Defence Australia at RAAF Base Amberley.

In March 2008, Boeing established a branch of its advanced research and development (R&D) unit – Boeing Research & Technology (BR&T) – in Australia to provide an R&D organisation for its in-country businesses and to collaborate with Australian R&D organisations, including universities and private sector R&D providers, the CSIRO and the Defence Science and Technology Organisation (DSTO).

Boeing has a research partnership with the Commonwealth Scientific and Industrial Research Organisation (CSIRO) that commenced in 1991. The CSIRO and Boeing collaborated on a 3D sensing and mapping payload for a NASA robot that operates on the International Space Station.
