= Corsair (dinghy) =

Class of sailing dinghy

- Class symbol

Development
- Designer: Alan Payne
- Name: Corsair

Boat
- Crew: 3

Hull
- Type: Monohull
- Construction: Fiberglass
- Hull weight: 136 kilograms (300 lb)
- LOH: 16 feet (4.9 m)
- Beam: 5.91 feet (1.80 m)

Sails
- Upwind sail area: 127 square feet (11.8 m^{2})

The Corsair is a class of sixteen foot, three handed sailing dinghy. The boat was designed by Australian designer Alan Payne who is famous for designing Sir Frank Packer's America's Cup challenge yachts Gretel and Gretel II.

== The boat ==
The boat is built in fiberglass, originally by De Havilland Marine (Sydney c1967), then Blue Water marine (until 2008) and most recently Corsair Dinghy Marine. It is a rather heavy boat, with minimum race weight being 136 kg and many boats frequently exceeding that. The sail area for the weight is small, leading to the boat acting similarly to a small keelboat in feel. The overhanded crew and no leaning-out devices add to this effect. This also makes the boat ideal for sail training as its strength and stability allow inexperienced sailors to jump in with more knowledgeable instructors; the boat is capable of taking up to 6 people and sometimes more in training situations. The class is also preferred by elder yachties as less physical strength or balance is required to race these boats with a "mind over matter" approach to sailing; there are still regular competitors with ages past 70.

== National title ==
The Corsair Class Association of Australia has since 1970 held an annual National Championship regatta over the Christmas-New Year period. This event currently encompasses three separate National Championship crowns; the most significant is the Open National Championship which determines the best Corsair Sailor in the country. Concurrently there is a National Cadet Championship for the Australian Navy Cadets who currently use the Corsair as their official training class. This championship has been run since the 1981 regatta. Since 1988 there has also been a National Youth Championship for competitors under the age of 21.

The championship has a schedule that includes many social and family events. This is reflected in the giving out of the "Family Trophy" for the highest placed family crew and the "Bottoms Up" award for the crew with the most capsizes.

National Champion	Boat	Skipper	State	Crew	2nd place boat	3rd place boat
2004/5	Succession	Dave Thomas	NSW		Watt Fun - George Watt	Sunset - Kevin Cook
2005/6	Ferocious	Aaron Hunt	QLD		Watt Fun - George Watt	Odin - Lee Randall
2006/7	Ferocious	Aaron Hunt	QLD		Succession - Dave Thomas	Power of Three - Brady Lowe
2007/8	Watt Fun	George Watt	NSW		Ferocious - Aaron Hunt	Decidious - Kathy Burke
