= De Havilland Australia =

Australian aerospace manufacturer

Hawker de Havilland Boeing Aerostructures Australia
- Type: Subsidiary
- Industry: Aerospace
- Founded: 1927
- Headquarters: Port Melbourne, Victoria, Australia
- Products: Airliner and Military aircraft sub-assemblies
- Revenue: A$300 million
- Number of employees: 1,300
- Parent: Boeing Australia
- Website: www.boeing.com.au

de Havilland Aircraft Pty Ltd (DHA) was an Australian subsidiary of the British aircraft manufacturer de Havilland, founded in 1927. It acquired the Commonwealth Aircraft Corporation in 1985 and was purchased by Boeing in 2000 and merged with the Boeing owned AeroSpace Technologies of Australia (formerly Government Aircraft Factories) to become Hawker de Havilland Aerospace Pty Ltd. In 2009, the name was changed to Boeing Aerostructures Australia and is a subsidiary of Boeing Australia.

== Early years and WWII ==
In March 1927 the de Havilland established DHA in Melbourne, its first overseas subsidiary. Its founder was Hereward de Havilland. DHA was set up to sell de Havilland products in Australia, to assemble aircraft that had been sold, and to provide repair and spare parts services. In 1930 DHA relocated to Mascot aerodrome in Sydney.

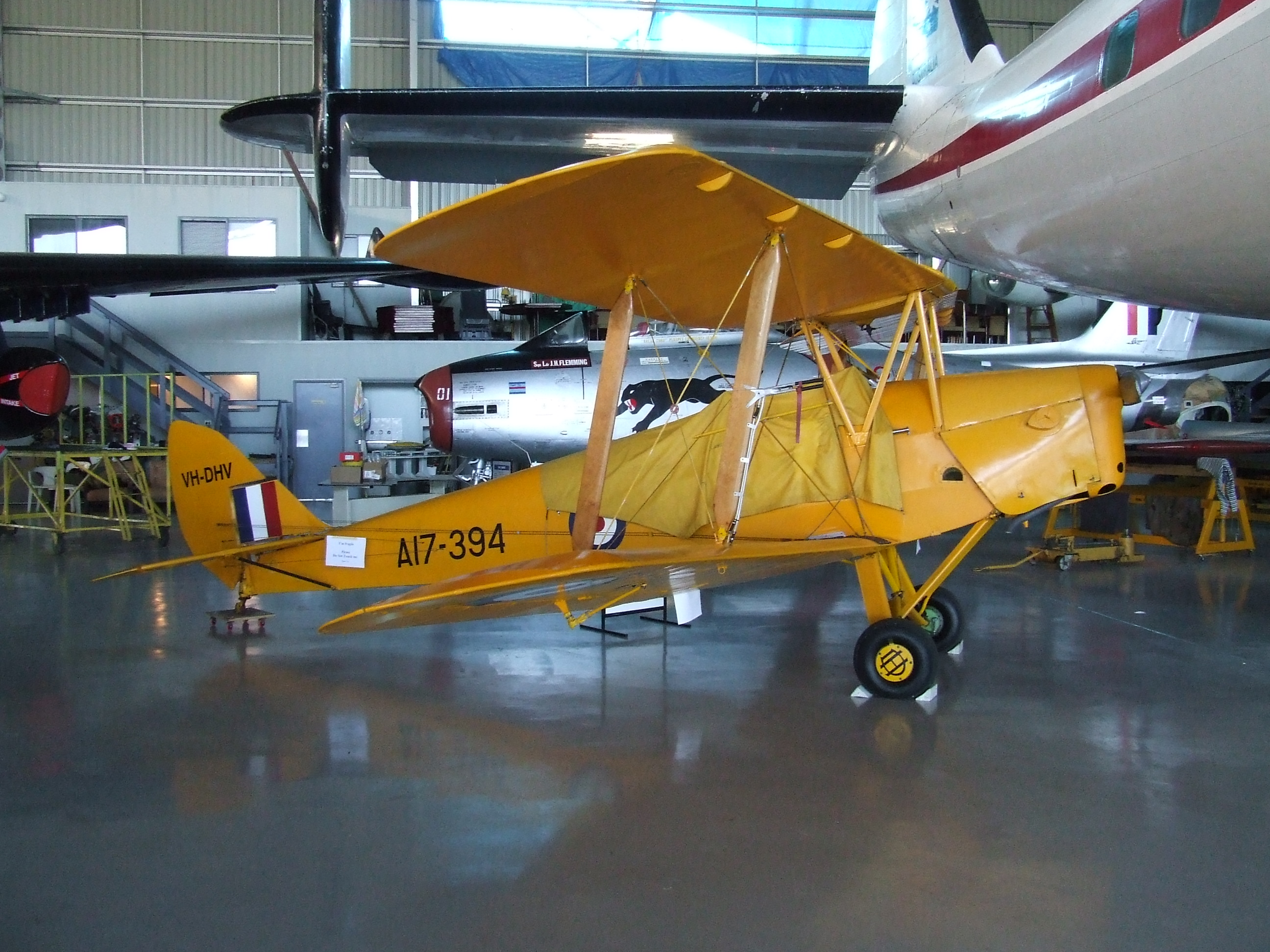
A Tiger Moth owned by Hawker de Havilland and flown as an historic aircraft

Prior to World War II DHA did not undertake any production of aircraft (although de Havilland designs were licence-built by other Australian organisations, most notably Qantas, the Larkin Aircraft Supply Company and the Cockatoo Island Naval Dockyard under Lawrence Wackett).

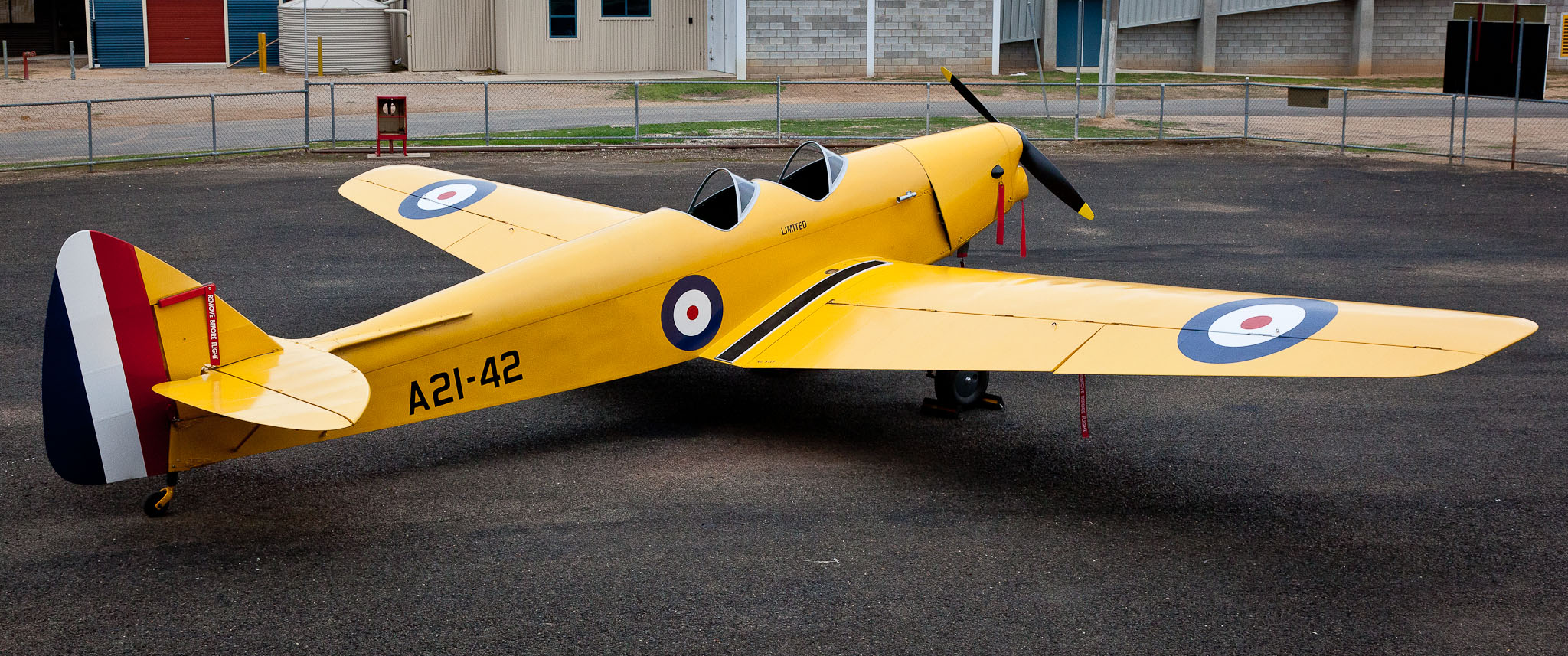
At least four Moth Minors were locally manufactured by DHA, A21-42 having been the last of these

In the late 1930s DHA began production of propellers both for the local market and for delivery to the parent company. In 1939 DHA delivered 20 DH.82 Tiger Moths assembled from imported fuselages and locally-built wings to the Royal Australian Air Force (RAAF). Another order for 50 DH.94 Moth Minors was also received - in October that year - from the Australian Department of Supply and Development, at least four of these having been built at Mascot using locally manufactured components. After the outbreak of war, the RAAF selected the Tiger Moth as its primary trainer and in 1940 DHA commenced licensed manufacture at a new facility at Bankstown; when production ended in February 1945 over one thousand had been built. DHA also licence-built 87 DH.84 Dragons from 1942 and 212 DH.98 Mosquitos from 1943 for the RAAF.

In 1942 DHA produced its first indigenous design. In March that year the RAAF issued a specification for a small transport glider. DHA responded with the DHA-G1 a high-wing design incorporating the nose section of the Dragon then being built. The first of two DHA-G1s was flown in June 1942. The RAAF ordered the improved seven-seat DHA-G2 in 1943: these differed from the DHA-G1 in having a larger fuselage and wing. By this time the threat of invasion of Australia by Japan and the rationale for the type had passed and only six were produced.

== Consolidation ==
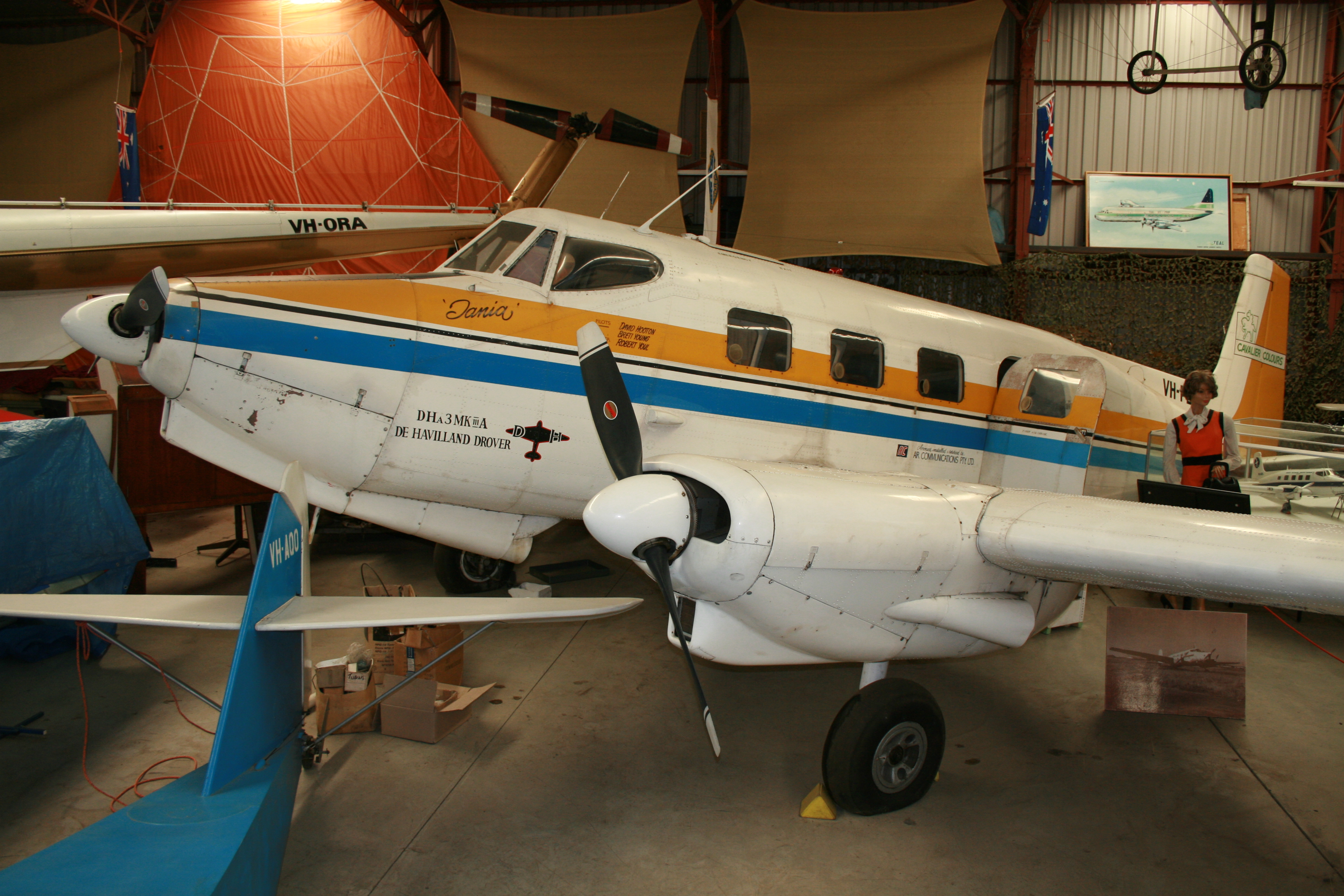
A DHA-3 Mk. 3a Drover with Lycoming O-360 engines at Bankstown

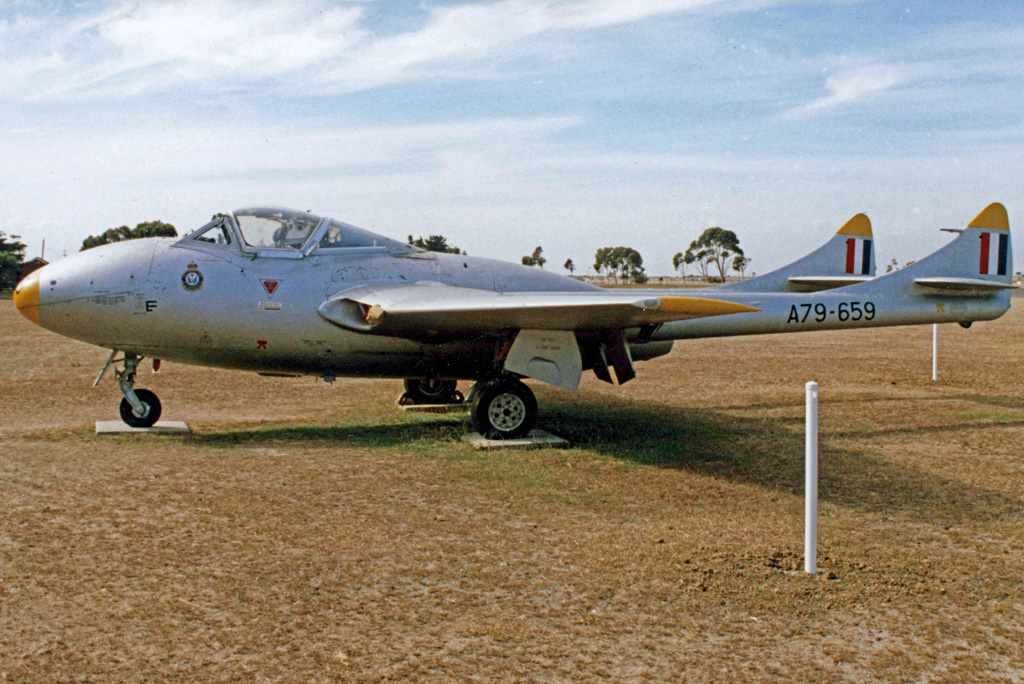
DH.115 Vampire T.35 built by DHA for operation by the RAAF's No.1 Flying Training School

Mosquito production continued until 1948, by which time work had begun on DHA's third indigenous design, the DHA-3 Drover. On 29 June 1949, following selection of the type by the RAAF in 1946, the first of 190 licence-built DH.100 and DH.115 Vampires had its first flight with DHA's chief test pilot Brian "Black Jack" Walker at the controls. Production of the Vampire continued until 1960, the same year the parent company was purchased by Hawker Siddeley. At this time the company also entered the general aviation market when it became the Australian distributor for Beechcraft in 1959. Following the absorption of de Havilland by Hawker Siddeley, DHA was renamed Hawker de Havilland (HdH) in 1965. In 1959 the de Havilland Marine division was formed.

The end of the Vampire programme marked the beginning of an extended period when no complete aircraft were produced, although there was work for the company in various modification (see DHA-3 Drover) and repair and overhaul programmes, including repairing RAAF DHC-4 Caribous damaged on active service during the Vietnam War and major servicing of the RAAF Caribou fleet. The wings for the CAC CA-25 were built at Bankstown between 1956 and 1959. One design project pursued during this time was for a military jet trainer for the RAAF. HdH offered its P17 indigenous design derived from the Vampire and was also involved in the Government Aircraft Factories (GAF) F2 project, which would have seen HdH undertaking production work on this aircraft with GAF and the Commonwealth Aircraft Corporation (CAC). The CAC-built version of the Aermacchi MB-326 was selected for production in 1965 and neither project proceeded. However all was not lost as CAC subcontracted to HdH the manufacture of the wings and wingtip fuel tanks, tailplanes, ailerons, flaps, hydraulic system components and landing gear for the Macchi, as well as parts of the Macchi's Viper engines built by CAC.

In 1970 HdH entered a new phase when it began to pursue subcontract work for civil airliner manufacturers. This work is now the main focus of the company and HdH has manufactured components for many of the major airliners of the later part of the 20th century and the 21st century, including work for Boeing, Airbus and McDonnell Douglas. In 1976 HdH undertook the refurbishment of 16 ex-US Navy Grumman S-2G Trackers for the Royal Australian Navy. In 1980 the thriving general aviation division was separated as Hawker Pacific but both companies remained part of Hawker Siddeley. In 1981 HdH formed the Australian Aircraft Consortium with CAC and GAF to design and manufacture the A10/A20 Wamira. The project suffered numerous delays and cost increases (due in part to the changing requirements of the RAAF and in part to the inexperience of the consortium members in designing to military requirements) and shortly after the prototype was completed at HdH's Bankstown factory the programme was cancelled at the end of 1985.

Earlier in 1985 HdH purchased CAC, which was initially kept as a separate company but was then renamed Hawker de Havilland Victoria (HdHV) the following year. At the time of the purchase both companies were in the initial stages of producing components for the GAF-built version of the F/A-18 Hornet. HdH at Bankstown was responsible for the landing gear and major hydraulic system components including aileron, rudder and flap actuators and hydraulic fluid reservoirs; while CAC/HdHV was responsible for the wing pylons, engine access panels, aft nozzle fairings, aircraft-mounted accessory drive gearboxes and engines.

== Building aircraft again ==
Following the cancellation of the Wamira, HdH resumed production of complete aircraft in 1987 after it was selected to build a version of the Pilatus PC-9 under licence for the RAAF. HdH was responsible for final assembly of 65 aircraft (known as the 'PC-9/A'), initially from kits supplied by Pilatus (17 aircraft), but with the components for the final 48 examples produced by HdHV and GAF (which by this time had been privatised and renamed Aerospace Technologies of Australia) (ASTA). Two Swiss-built PC-9s were already delivered in 1987. The last Australian-made PC-9/A was delivered in May 1992.

In May 1988 HdH delivered the first Bankstown-assembled Sikorsky Black Hawk to the RAAF. After eight had been built the RAAF's helicopters were transferred to the Australian Army; HdH deliveries continued to the Army until the last of 38 locally assembled aircraft was delivered in January 1991. In March the following year the last PC-9/A was delivered. In 1992 HdH was de-listed from the Australian Securities Exchange when it was sold to BTR Nylex.

The PC-9/A was the last complete aircraft type to be built by HdH, although RAAF Caribous could still be seen at Bankstown until 1994. During the same time period HdH was involved in the McDonnell Douglas Helicopters MDX project, HdH being responsible the design and development of the fuselage in Sydney with manufacture and final assembly at the Bankstown(Sydney) and Fishermen's Bend ( Melbourne) plants. In 1998 the company was bought by Tenix and Hawker Pacific was sold to Swedish company Celsius. In 2000 Tenix sold HdH to Boeing which merged the company with ASTA to form Hawker de Havilland Aerospace within Boeing Australia. Today HdH is in the forefront of composite structures technology and manufactures composite and alloy components for the Airbus A320, Airbus A330, Airbus A340, Airbus A380, Bombardier Challenger 300, Boeing 737, Boeing 747 and Boeing 777 as well as for several military aerospace programmes.

== Aircraft ==
- AAC Wamira, 1 prototype built 1984
- de Havilland Australia DHA-G1, 2 prototypes built 1942
- de Havilland Australia DHA-G2, 6 built 1943 based on improved production version of G1
- de Havilland Australia DHA-3 Drover

=== Licensed built de Havilland aircraft ===
- de Havilland DH.82 Tiger Moth 1085 built from 1940–1945
- de Havilland DH.84 Dragon, 87 built from 1942–1943
- de Havilland DH.94 Moth Minor, 41 built 1939–?
- de Havilland DH.98 Mosquito, 212 built from 1943–1948
- de Havilland DH.100 Vampire, 80 built from 1946–1960
- de Havilland DH.115 Vampire, 73 built from 1946–1960

=== Other licensed built ===
- Pilatus PC-9A 48 built 1987–1992
- Sikorsky S-70A-9 Black Hawk, 38 built from 1988–1991 for RAAF and finally to Australian Army
