= Columbia T-23 =

Sailboat class

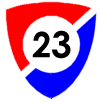

Development
- Designer: Alan Payne
- Location: United States
- Year: 1973
- No. built: 400
- Builder: Columbia Yachts
- Name: Columbia T-23

Boat
- Displacement: 2,300 lb (1,043 kg)
- Draft: 1.08 ft (0.33 m)

Hull
- Type: monohull
- Construction: fiberglass
- LOA: 22.58 ft (6.88 m)
- LWL: 20.00 ft (6.10 m)
- Beam: 7.92 ft (2.41 m)
- Engine: outboard motor

Hull appendages
- Keel: shoal draft fin keel
- Ballast: 810 lb (367 kg)
- Rudder: transom-mounted rudder

Rig
- Rig type: Bermuda rig
- I foretriangle height: 25.83 ft (7.87 m)
- J foretriangle base: 9.15 ft (2.79 m)
- P mainsail luff: 21.58 ft (6.58 m)
- E mainsail foot: 9.25 ft (2.82 m)

Sails
- Sailplan: masthead sloop
- Mainsail area: 99.81 sq ft (9.273 m^{2})
- Jib/genoa area: 118.17 sq ft (10.978 m^{2})
- Total sail area: 217.98 sq ft (20.251 m^{2})

Racing
- PHRF: 264

The Columbia T-23, or Columbia T23, is an American sailboat that was designed by Australian Alan Payne and first built in 1973. The "T" designation indicates that the boat is designed to be trailerable.

== Production ==
The design was built by Columbia Yachts in the United States, from 1973 until 1977, with 400 boats completed, but it is now out of production.

The molds were widely reused to build other boats and led to the Coronado 23-2, the Charger 23, Corsair 23 and the Lancer 25. Copies were also built by Bayliner, US Yachts and Pearson Yachts.

== Design ==
The Columbia T-23 is a recreational keelboat, built predominantly of fiberglass, with wood trim. It has a masthead sloop rig, a raked stem, a reverse transom, a transom-hung rudder controlled by a tiller and a fixed shoal draft fin keel. It displaces 2,300 lb (1,043 kg) and carries 810 lb (367 kg) of lead ballast.

The boat has a draft of 1.08 ft (0.33 m) with the standard keel, allowing beaching or ground transportation on a trailer.

The boat is normally fitted with a small 3 to 6 hp (2 to 4 kW) outboard motor for docking and maneuvering.

The design has sleeping accommodation for four people, with a double "V"-berth in the bow cabin and two straight settee quarter berths in the main cabin. The galley is located on both side just aft of the bow cabin. The galley is equipped with a sink and an optional stove. The optional head is located centered under the bow cabin "V"-berth. Cabin headroom is 51 in (130 cm). The fresh water tank has a capacity of 5 U.S. gallons (19 L; 4.2 imp gal).

The design has a PHRF racing average handicap of 264 and a hull speed of 6.0 kn (11.1 km/h).

== Operational history ==
In a 2010 review Steve Henkel wrote, "here's another boat with a reverse transom in which the marketer has added in the "rump" to come up with boat length—which should be LOD, but is given as hull length. And so once again we cut this boat down to size, in this case 21' 10" instead of the claimed 22! 7". The Columbia T23 is said to be identical to the Coronado 23 Mk II, except for the gelcoat colors and cabin windows. This is understandable since in the 1970s the Whittaker Corporation owned both the Columbia and Coronado brands, and deemed that they could be intermingled. Best features: No notable features perceived by us. Worst features: Compared to her comp[etitor]s, the T23 has about the same shallow draft, but is the only vessel without a centerboard option. Consequently her upwind performance predictably will be the worst of the group—notwithstanding her PHRF rating. At least one owner reports that two drains in the aft end of the cockpit are plumbed through the transom, but are close enough to the waterline so that when the boat heels with any significant weight in the cockpit, water will drain into the cockpit rather than out of it."

== See also ==
- List of sailing boat types
