= 1985 Pukekohe 500 =

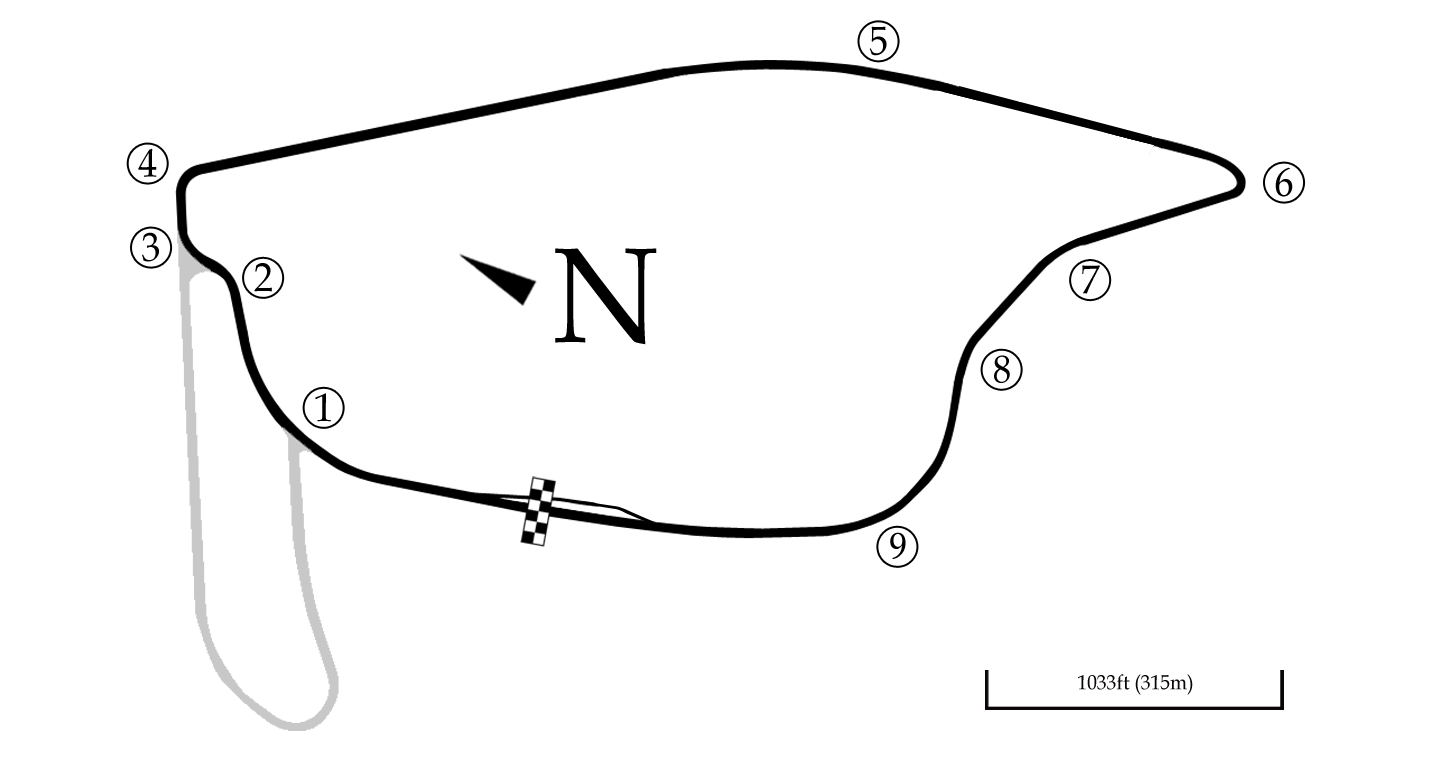
Layout of the Pukekohe Park Raceway (1967-1989)

The 1985 Pukekohe 500 (known as the Nissan Sport 500 for sponsorship reasons) was an endurance race for Group A touring cars held at the Pukekohe Park Raceway in New Zealand on 3 February 1985. The race was the second and final round of the 1985 Nissan Sports Series. The race, held over 143 laps of the 2,841 m (1.77 mi) circuit for a total of 406 km (252 mi).

The race, held a week after the Wellington 500, was won by New Zealand drivers Neville Crichton and Wayne Wilkinson driving a BMW 635 CSi from the Tom Walkinshaw Racing Rover Vitesse of Tom Walkinshaw and Win Percy with Kiwis Neal Lowe and Kent Baigent finishing third in their BMW 635.

After finishing third in Wellington, the win saw Crichton and Wilkinson as co-winners of the Nissan Sports Series.

The Nissan Sport Series was run to the FIA's international Group A rules and provided a number of Australian teams, including the famed Holden Dealer Team, to get some racing laps in their new cars before the 1985 Australian Touring Car Championship after changing from the locally developed Group C rules at the end of 1984.

== Results ==
Position	Class	No.	Entrant	Drivers	Car	Laps	Grid
1	Div.3	4	John Andrew Motorsport	(New Zealand) Neville Crichton (New Zealand) Wayne Wilkinson	BMW 635 CSi	143	2
2	Div.3	2	Tom Walkinshaw Racing	(United Kingdom) Tom Walkinshaw (United Kingdom) Win Percy	Rover Vitesse	143	1
3	Div.3	3	H. Kent Baigent	(New Zealand) Kent Baigent (New Zealand) Neal Lowe	BMW 635 CSi	141	5
4	Div.3	11	Mark Petch Motorsport	(Belgium) Michel Delcourt (New Zealand) Robbie Francevic	Volvo 240T	141	6
5	Div.1	71		(New Zealand) Paul Adams (New Zealand) Allan Woolf	Toyota Corolla GT AE86	127	11
6	Div.2	37	Dealer Team Nissan	(New Zealand) Kevin Ryan (New Zealand) Ian Tulloch	Nissan Bluebird Turbo	124	19
7	Div.2	67	Ray Gulson	(Australia) Ray Gulson (Australia) Grant O'Donnell	Alfa Romeo GTV6	124	8
8	Div.1	72	Bob Holden Motors	(Australia) Bob Holden (Australia) Glenn Clark	Toyota Sprinter	123	10
9	Div.2	32		(New Zealand) Glenn McIntyre (New Zealand) Dennis Roderick	Isuzu Gemini ZZ	122	18
10	Div.2	32	MacDonald Halligan Motors	(New Zealand) Derek MacDonald (New Zealand) Ross MacDonald	Mitsubishi Mirage Turbo	122	16
11	Div.1	74	Sip ‘n Save Wines	(New Zealand) Colin McGregor (New Zealand) Bryce Platt	VW Golf GTI	117	15
??	Div.2	34	Chris Heyer's Kingswood Import Centre	(Australia) Chris Heyer (New Zealand) Graham McGregor	Audi 80 2.2	??	14
??	Div.1	73	K. Bolton	(New Zealand) Steve Willy (New Zealand) David Janes	Toyota Corolla GT AE86	??	13
??	Div.3	10	Pegasus Enterprises Ltd.	(New Zealand) Robert Delbin (New Zealand) Chris Delbin	Holden VK Commodore	??	12
??	Div.3	9		(New Zealand) Lew McKinnon (New Zealand) John Power	Holden VK Commodore	??	9
DNF	Div.3	6	Johnstone BMW Auckland	(New Zealand) John Morton (United Kingdom) Frank Sytner	BMW 635 CSi	??	3
DNF	Div.3	05	Holden Dealer Team	(Australia) Peter Brock (Australia) Larry Perkins	Holden VK Commodore	??	7
DNF	Div.3	17	Bruce Anderson	(New Zealand) Bruce Anderson (Australia) Dick Johnson	Ford XE Falcon	??	4
DNF	Div.2	31	L. Tattle	(New Zealand) Bob Barry (New Zealand) Rob Whitehouse	Fiat Ritmo 130TC	??	17
DNS	Div.2	8	Gemco Motor Sport	(New Zealand) Gary Pederson (New Zealand) Dave McMillan	Fiat Ritmo 130TC		

* The event attracted 20 entries and 19 starters.

== Notes ==
- Pole Position: #2 Tom Walkinshaw, Rover Vitesse - 1:29.80
- Fastest Lap: N/A
- Race Time: N/A

== See also ==
- James Hardie 1000, 1985/86
- The Australian Racing History of Ford, 1989
- The Official Racing History of Holden, 1988
