= 2002 Sydney to Hobart Yacht Race =

2002 annual yacht race in Australia

58th Sydney to Hobart Yacht Race
Event information
- Type: Yacht
- Dates: 26 – 30 December 2002
- Sponsor: Rolex
- Host city: Sydney, Hobart
- Boats: 57
- Distance: 630 nautical miles (1,170 km)
- Website: Website archive

Results
- Winner (2002): Alfa Romeo I (Neville Crichton)

Succession
- Previous: Assa Abloy (Neal McDonald) 2001
- Next: Skandia (Grant Wharington) in 2003

The 2002 Sydney to Hobart Yacht Race, sponsored by Rolex, was the 58th annual running of the "blue water classic" Sydney to Hobart Yacht Race. As in past editions of the race, it was hosted by the Cruising Yacht Club of Australia based in Sydney, New South Wales. The 2002 edition began on Sydney Harbour, at 1pm on Boxing Day (26 December 2002), before heading south for 630 nautical miles (1,170 km) through the Tasman Sea, past Bass Strait, into Storm Bay and up the River Derwent, to cross the finish line in Hobart, Tasmania.

The 2002 fleet comprised 57 starters of which 53 completed the race and 4 yachts retired.

== Results ==
=== Line Honours ===
Pos	Sail Number	Yacht	State/Country	Yacht Type	LOA (Metres)	Skipper	Elapsed time d:hh:mm:ss
1	NZL80	Alfa Romeo	New Zealand	Reichel Pugh 90	27.43	Neville Crichton	2:04:58:52
2	A99	Grundig	New South Wales	Dovell MBD Open 66	20.03	Sean Langman	2:06:42:50
3	GBR1R	Canon Leopard	(United Kingdom) Great Britain	Reichel Pugh 96	29.26	Mike Slade; Jeff Stagg	2:07:55:58
4	M10	Australian Skandia Wild Thing	(Victoria (state)) Victoria	Murray Burns Dovell MBD 83	25.20	Grant Wharington	2:09:33:31
5	SWE11111	Nicorette	Sweden	Simonis-Voogd 79 Maxi	24.07	Ludde Ingvall	2:10:15:00
6	C1	Brindabella	New South Wales	Jutson 79	24.08	George Snow	2:13:24:26
7	MH888	Magnavox 2UE	New South Wales	Farr Volvo Ocean 60	19.44	Peter Sorenson; Stan Zemanek; Julie Hodder	2:14:36:37
8	8848	Broomstick	New South Wales	Fa-Steinman Modified Custom 66	20.00	Michael Cranitch; Ray Wallace	2:14:49:43
9	8889	Hollywood Boulevard	New South Wales	Farr 52 OD	15.85	Ray Roberts	2:14:50:51
10	8679	Merit Navigator	New South Wales	Farr Volvo Ocean 60	19.44	Ian Treleaven	2:14:53:59
11	8880	Ichi Ban	New South Wales	Farr 52 OD	15.85	Matt Allen	2:15:03:12
12	5474	Infinity III	New South Wales	Farr 65	19.72	Martin James	2:15:55:58
13	NZL6006	Starlight Express	New Zealand	Davidson 55	16.76	Stewart Thwaites	2:16:15:48
14	6037	Formulaonesailing.com	(United Kingdom) Great Britain	Murray Burns Dovell Sydney 60	18.15	Alex Thompson	2:16:35:04
15	5015	Dreamland	United States	Frers Swan 86	26.23	Brook Lewfest	2:18:37:53
16	8833	Fitness First Sting	New South Wales	Farr 49	15.28	Terry Mullens	2:18:54:22
17	AUS70	Ragamuffin	New South Wales	Farr 50	15.50	Syd Fischer	2:19:11:03
18	AUS6606	Quest	New South Wales	Nelson Marek 46	14.19	Robert Steel	2:20:03:41
19	7878	Aspect	New South Wales	Lyons 52	16.20	David Pescud	2:20:34:31
20	SM2	Another Challenge	(Victoria (state)) Victoria	Murray Burns Dovell Sydney 38	11.78	Lou Abrahams	3:01:04:55
21	6188	Strewth	New South Wales	Lyons MKL 49	14.95	Geoffrey Hill	3:01:20:08
22	R33	Chutzpah	(Victoria (state)) Victoria	Murray Burns Dovell Sydney 38	11.80	Bruce Taylor	3:01:49:12
23	5995	Nips N Tux	New South Wales	Jeppersen IMX40	12.10	Howard de Torres	3:07:36:54
24	8383	Krakatoa	New South Wales	Young 31	9.54	Rod Skellet	3:07:49:45
25	7272	Andrew Short Marine Mercury	New South Wales	Murray Burns Dovell Sydney 38	11.80	Andrew Short	3:08:57:11
26	6081	Polar Star	New South Wales	Murray Burns Dovell Sydney 38	11.80	Natasha Henley-Smith; Georgy Shayduko	3:09:03:31
27	SM1996	No Fearr	(Victoria (state)) Victoria	Farr Cookson 12	11.99	Philip Coombs	3:09:04:11
28	R1111	Toecutter	(Victoria (state)) Victoria	Hick 31	9.45	Robert Hick	3:09:19:14
29	9407	P&O Nedlloyd	New South Wales	Farr Beneteau 40.7	11.92	David Beak; Michael Spies	3:09:34:05
30	242	Sea Jay	New South Wales	Burns BH 41	12.46	Scott Wheelhouse	3:09:36:57
31	A8	Mirrabooka	Tasmania	Frers 47	13.40	John Bennetto	3:09:42:03
32	MH2000	Anteater	New South Wales	Farr Beneteau 45	13.69	Phil Hearse	3:09:44:34
33	8338	AFR Midnight Rambler	New South Wales	Jutson Northshore 369	11.20	Ed Psaltis; Bob Thomas	3:09:45:20
34	2999	Getaway-sailing.com	New South Wales	Murray Burns Dovell Sydney 38	11.80	Ty Oxley; Peter Mooney	3:09:50:46
35	SM377	Bacardi	(Victoria (state)) Victoria	Peterson 44	13.34	Graeme Ainley; John Williams	3:09:57:27
36	4057	Aurora	New South Wales	Farr 40	12.19	Jim Holley	3:10:04:14
37	1987	Bright Morning Star	New South Wales	Peterson 50	15.50	Randal Wilson; Hugh O'Neill	3:10:06:21
38	533	Pippin	New South Wales	Farr 37	11.40	David Taylor	3:10:08:06
39	1317	Kickatinalong	New South Wales	Adams 13 Modified	13.41	Mike De Berg; Geoff Smith	3:10:14:00
40	5900	Wahoo	New South Wales	Frers 40	12.35	Brian Emerson	3:10:52:09
41	M236	Santana	New South Wales	Holland Swan 43	13.30	Mike Kellaher	3:12:12:10
42	6264	Quiddity	Netherlands	J&J Design Grand Soleil 43	12.87	Peter Hoving	3:12:29:14
43	8333	Redrock Communications	New South Wales	Hick 30	8.99	Chris Bowling	3:12:37:43
44	9333	Police Car	New South Wales	Dubois 42	12.80	Alan Duffy	3:13:13:06
45	MH106	Impeccable	New South Wales	Peterson 3/4 Tonner IOR	10.23	John Walker	3:14:11:53
46	SM616	Magic	(Victoria (state)) Victoria	Sparkman & Stephens S&S 39	11.77	Philip Spey-Bailey	3:15:50:43
47	4924	She II	New South Wales	Mull Olsen 40	12.29	Peter Rogers	3:16:01:08
48	A113	Mark Twain	New South Wales	Sparkman & Stephens S&S 39	11.80	Hugh O'Neill	3:17:21:21
49	5950	Komatsu St Malo	New South Wales	Kaufman Northshore 38	11.74	Shane Kearns	3:17:27:23
50	S1001	Andromeda III	(Victoria (state)) Victoria	Adams 11	11.10	Chris Dawe	3:20:31:05
51	5664	Delta Wing	New South Wales	Boden 44 Cruiser	13.52	Bill Koppe; Lance Whittaker	3:20:53:18
52	327	Zeus II	New South Wales	Joubert Currawong 30	9.25	James Dunstan	3:21:16:25
53	371	Berrimilla	New South Wales	Joubert Brolga 33	10.10	Alex Whitworth	3:23:23:44
DNF	1986	Trumpcard	Queensland	Van de Stadt 44 Sloop	13.33	Craig Coulsen	Retired-Collision Damage
DNF	1195	Valheru	Tasmania	Elliott 43 IMS Racer	13.05	Anthony Lyall	Retired-Collision Damage
DNF	8448	Loki	New South Wales	Frers Swan 48	14.83	Stephen Ainsworth	Retired-Disqualified ^{1}
DNF	7744	Peugeot Racing	France	Farr Beneteau First 47.7	14.51	Malcolm Roe; Christophe Vanek	Retired-Disqualified ^{2}

Notes

^1 – Loki were disqualified from the race and was scored as a DNF by the Race Committee due to breaching RRS Rules 1.1 & 44.1 in a collision with Trumpcard at the start of the race in Sydney Harbour.
^2 – Peugeot Racing were disqualified from the race and was scored as a DNF by the Race Committee due to breaching RRS Rules 1.1 & 44.1 in a collision with Valheru at the start of the race in Sydney Harbour.

=== Overall Handicap ===
Pos	Division	Sail Number	Yacht	State/Country	Yacht Type	LOA (Metres)	Skipper	Corrected time d:hh:mm:ss
1	A	AUS6606	Quest	New South Wales	Nelson Marek 46	14.19	Robert Steel	2:04:47:18
2	B	327	Zeus II	New South Wales	Joubert Currawong 30	9.25	James Dunstan	2:04:52:03
3	C	SM2	Another Challenge	(Victoria (state)) Victoria	Murray Burns Dovell Sydney 38	11.78	Lou Abrahams	2:05:00:23
4	A	NZL6006	Starlight Express	New Zealand	Davidson 55	16.76	Stewart Thwaites	2:05:16:27
5	C	R33	Chutzpah	(Victoria (state)) Victoria	Murray Burns Dovell Sydney 38	11.80	Bruce Taylor	2:05:39:09
6	A	8833	Fitness First Sting	New South Wales	Farr 49	15.28	Terry Mullens	2:05:46:45
7	A	6037	Formulaonesailing.com	(United Kingdom) Great Britain	Murray Burns Dovell Sydney 60	18.15	Alex Thompson	2:05:49:06
8	A	AUS70	Ragamuffin	New South Wales	Farr 50	15.50	Syd Fischer	2:05:58:57
9	B	533	Pippin	New South Wales	Farr 37	11.40	David Taylor	2:05:59:16
10	C	8333	Redrock Communications	New South Wales	Hick 30	8.99	Chris Bowling	2:06:15:19
11	B	MH106	Impeccable	New South Wales	Peterson 3/4 Tonner IOR	10.23	John Walker	2:06:19:19
12	A	8889	Hollywood Boulevard	New South Wales	Farr 52 OD	15.85	Ray Roberts	2:07:35:19
13	A	8880	Ichi Ban	New South Wales	Farr 52 OD	15.85	Matt Allen	2:07:56:50
14	B	4057	Aurora	New South Wales	Farr 40	12.19	Jim Holley	2:08:00:18
15	C	R1111	Toecutter	(Victoria (state)) Victoria	Hick 31	9.45	Robert Hick	2:08:06:40
16	C	5995	Nips N Tux	New South Wales	Jeppersen IMX40	12.10	Howard de Torres	2:08:17:45
17	B	SM377	Bacardi	(Victoria (state)) Victoria	Peterson 44	13.34	Graeme Ainley; John Williams	2:08:24:11
18	C	9407	P&O Nedlloyd	New South Wales	Farr Beneteau 40.7	11.92	David Beak; Michael Spies	2:08:30:37
19	C	8338	AFR Midnight Rambler	New South Wales	Jutson Northshore 369	11.20	Ed Psaltis; Bob Thomas	2:09:31:24
20	C	7272	Andrew Short Marine Mercury	New South Wales	Murray Burns Dovell Sydney 38	11.80	Andrew Short	2:10:40:00
21	C	6081	Polar Star	New South Wales	Murray Burns Dovell Sydney 38	11.80	Natasha Henley-Smith; Georgy Shayduko	2:11:00:38
22	C	2999	Getaway-sailing.com	New South Wales	Murray Burns Dovell Sydney 38	11.80	Ty Oxley; Peter Mooney	2:11:24:14
23	B	A8	Mirrabooka	Tasmania	Frers 47	13.40	John Bennetto	2:11:32:07
24	B	242	Sea Jay	New South Wales	Burns BH 41	12.46	Scott Wheelhouse	2:12:36:29
25	C	SM1996	No Fearr	(Victoria (state)) Victoria	Farr Cookson 12	11.99	Philip Coombs	2:12:46:12
26	B	5950	Komatsu St Malo	New South Wales	Kaufman Northshore 38	11.74	Shane Kearns	2:13:24:10
27	A	C1	Brindabella	New South Wales	Jutson 79	24.08	George Snow	2:13:24:26
DNF	B	1986	Trumpcard	Queensland	Van de Stadt 44 Sloop	13.33	Craig Coulsen	Retired-Collision Damage
DNF	B	1195	Valheru	Tasmania	Elliott 43 IMS Racer	13.05	Anthony Lyall	Retired-Collision Damage
DNF	B	8448	Loki	New South Wales	Frers Swan 48	14.83	Stephen Ainsworth	Retired-Disqualified ^{1}

Notes

^1 – Loki were disqualified from the race and was scored as a DNF by the Race Committee due to breaching RRS Rules 1.1 & 44.1 in a collision with Trumpcard at the start of the race in Sydney Harbour.
