= 2003 Sydney to Hobart Yacht Race =

2003 annual yacht race in Australia

59th Sydney to Hobart Yacht Race
Event information
- Type: Yacht
- Dates: 26 December 2003 – 1 January 2004
- Sponsor: Rolex
- Host city: Sydney, Hobart
- Boats: 56
- Distance: 630 nautical miles (1,170 km)
- Website: Website archive

Results
- Winner (2004): Skandia (Grant Wharington)

Succession
- Previous: Alfa Romeo I (Neville Crichton) in 2002
- Next: Nicorette III (Ludde Ingvall) in 2004

The 2003 Sydney to Hobart Yacht Race, sponsored by Rolex, was the 59th annual running of the "blue water classic" Sydney to Hobart Yacht Race. As in past editions of the race, it was hosted by the Cruising Yacht Club of Australia based in Sydney, New South Wales.It began at Sydney Harbour, at 1pm on Boxing Day (26 December 2003), before heading south for 630 nautical miles (1,170 km) through the Tasman Sea, past Bass Strait, into Storm Bay and up the River Derwent, to cross the finish line in Hobart, Tasmania.

The 2003 fleet comprised 56 starters of which 52 completed the race and 4 yachts retired.

== Results ==
=== Line Honours ===
Pos	Sail Number	Yacht	State/Country	Yacht Type	LOA (Metres)	Skipper	Elapsed time d:hh:mm:ss
1	M10	Skandia	(Victoria (state)) Victoria	Jones IRC Maxi 98	30.00	Grant Wharington	2:15:14:06
2	NZL10001	Zana	New Zealand	Bakewell-White Maxi 30m	30.00	Stewart Thwaites	2:15:28:30
3	A99	Grundig AAPT	New South Wales	Dovell MBD Open 66	20.00	Sean Langman	2:20:19:39
4	C1	Brindabella	New South Wales	Jutson 79	24.08	George Snow	2:21:30:08
5	NOR2	Andrew Short Marine	New South Wales	Davidson Volvo Ocean 60	19.44	Andrew Short	2:22:10:50
6	8844	Seriously TEN	New South Wales	Davidson Volvo Ocean 60	19.44	John Woodruff; Eric Robinson; Sean James	2:22:53:56
7	USA16	Zaraffa	United States	Reichel Pugh 65	20.49	Skip Sheldon	2:23:56:36
8	8880	Ichi Ban	New South Wales	Farr 52	15.79	Matt Allen	3:03:33:44
9	MH 888	Nokia 2UE	New South Wales	Farr Volvo Ocean 60	19.44	Peter Sorenson; Julie Hodder; Mark Gray	3:04:42:28
10	1836	Yendys	New South Wales	Judel Vroljik JV52	15.75	Geoff Ross	3:07:40:23
11	SWE7	Formulaonesailing.com	New South Wales	Farr Volvo Ocean 60	19.44	Denise Caffari	3:07:50:50
12	8833	Bounder	(United Kingdom) Great Britain	Farr 49	15.28	Chris Little	3:07:58:06
13	93	Merlin	New South Wales	Kaiko 51 Cruiser Racer	15.60	David Forbes; Richard Brooks	3:08:30:12
14	AUS70	Ragamuffin	New South Wales	Farr 50	15.50	Syd Fischer	3:11:23:22
15	AUS6606	Quest	New South Wales	Nelson Marek 46	14.19	Robert Steel	3:11:34:27
16	7878	KAZ	New South Wales	Lyons 52	16.20	David Pescud	3:13:10:27
17	YC560	Pale Ale Rager	South Australia	Elliott 56	17.10	Gary Shanks	3:13:11:51
18	HY6572	Ice Fire	Western Australia	Mummery 45	13.85	Hans Butter	3:13:19:23
19	SA3300	Secret Mens Business	South Australia	Reichel Pugh 46	12.75	Geoff Boettcher	3:14:13:46
20	R33	Chutzpah	(Victoria (state)) Victoria	Murray Burns Dovell Sydney 38	11.60	Bruce Taylor	3:14:20:50
21	SM2	Another Challenge	(Victoria (state)) Victoria	Murray Burns Dovell Sydney 38	11.78	Lou Abrahams	3:14:45:47
22	8448	Loki	New South Wales	Frers Swan 48	14.83	Stephen Ainsworth	3:15:05:44
23	6565	Team Lexus	New South Wales	Murray Burns Dovell Sydney 38	11.78	Rupert Henry	3:15:39:04
24	558	Interum	Tasmania	Lyons 41	12.17	Craig King	3:15:40:03
25	HI8	Asylum	Queensland	Murray Burns Dovell Sydney 38	11.78	Wayne Kirkpatrick	3:15:40:40
26	SM1400	Kontrol	(Victoria (state)) Victoria	Jones Hart 45	13.85	Peter Blake	3:15:46:52
27	5995	Nips-N-Tux	New South Wales	Jeppersen IMX 40	12.10	Howard De Torres	3:15:48:13
28	4100	Terra Firma	(Victoria (state)) Victoria	Murray 41	12.48	Nicholas Bartels; Martin Vaughan	3:16:14:41
29	9407	First National Real Estate	New South Wales	Farr Beneteau 40.7	11.92	Michael Spies; Peter Johnson	3:16:32:24
30	R69	Fuzzy Logic	(Victoria (state)) Victoria	Murray Burns Dovell ILC 40	12.48	Paul Roberts; Bill Lennon	3:17:19:15
31	8338	AFR Midnight Rambler	New South Wales	Jutson Northshore 369	11.20	Ed Psaltis; Bob Thomas	3:18:25:15
32	SA1331	Aint Misbehavin	(United Kingdom) Great Britain	Lavranos 47	14.29	Jean Jacques Provoyeur	3:18:34:07
33	9477	Shere Khan	New South Wales	Farr Beneteau First 47.7	15.50	Richard Wyatt; Graeme Fraser	3:19:41:14
34	8383	Krakatoa	New South Wales	Young 31	9.54	Rod Skellet	3:19:48:12
35	SM117	Tilting at Windmills	(Victoria (state)) Victoria	Joubert Modified John Dory 42	12.83	Thorry Gunnersen	3:19:53:38
36	R1111	Toecutter	(Victoria (state)) Victoria	Hick 31	9.45	Robert Hick	3:19:55:27
37	A8	Mirrabooka	Tasmania	Frers 47	13.40	John Bennetto	3:20:03:22
38	5985	Balmain Experience	New South Wales	Kaufman-Jutson NSX 38	11.63	Tony Williams	3:22:27:26
39	1987	Bright Morning Star	New South Wales	Peterson 50	15.50	Randal Wilson; Hugh O'Neill	3:23:33:42
40	S4440	Midnight Rambler II	(Victoria (state)) Victoria	Farr 40	12.24	Dennis Millikan	4:00:13:54
41	294	Love & War	New South Wales	Sparkman & Stephens S&S 47	14.21	Peter Kurts	4:00:18:42
42	533	Pippin	Tasmania	Farr 37	11.40	David Taylor	4:00:20:59
43	5350	Matangi	Tasmania	Frers 39	11.78	David Stephenson	4:00:22:45
44	4057	Aurora	New South Wales	Farr 40	12.19	Jim Holley	4:01:39:54
45	5900	Wahoo	New South Wales	Frers 40	12.35	Brian Emerson	4:01:43:52
46	1317	Kickatinalong	New South Wales	Adams 13 Modified	13.41	Geoff Smith	4:01:47:37
47	MH106	Impeccable	New South Wales	Peterson 3/4 Tonner IOR	10.20	John Walker	4:04:20:44
48	YC717	Liberator	South Australia	Farr 42	12.90	Geoff Catt	4:05:39:32
49	2557	Witchdoctor	New South Wales	Davidson 42	12.00	Maurice Cameron	4:07:13:16
50	F88	Degrees of Freedom	Western Australia	Runnalls 38	11.60	Mike Reynolds	4:10:38:05
51	371	Berrimilla	New South Wales	Joubert Brolga 33	10.10	Alex Whitworth	5:18:29:32
52	2837	Katinka	New South Wales	Joubert Currawong 30	9.25	Paul O'Connell	6:00:07:30
DNF	6081	Dodo	New South Wales	Murray Burns Dovell Sydney 38	11.78	Adrian Dunphy	Retired-Mainsail Damage
DNF	SM9797	Dysons Cobb & Co	(Victoria (state)) Victoria	Farr 47	14.32	Chris Dare	Retired-Broken Mast
DNF	SWE11111	Nicorette	Sweden	Simonis-Voogd 79 Maxi	24.07	Ludde Ingvall	Retired-Hull Damage
DNF	2999	Obsession	New South Wales	Murray Burns Dovell Sydney 38	11.78	Scot Wheelhouse; Mark Hunter	Retired-Disqualified ^{1}

Notes

^1 – Obsession were disqualified from the race and was scored as a DNF by the Race Committee due to breaching Sailing Instruction Rules 44.1 & 44.2 by failing to report into race control within one hour of passing the Green Cape mandatory safety check-in point before entering the Bass Strait during the race.

=== Overall Handicap ===
Pos	Division	Sail Number	Yacht	State/Country	Yacht Type	LOA (Metres)	Skipper	Corrected time d:hh:mm:ss
1	C	9407	First National Real Estate	New South Wales	Farr Beneteau 40.7	11.92	Michael Spies; Peter Johnson	3:14:14:17
2	C	SM117	Tilting at Windmills	(Victoria (state)) Victoria	Joubert Modified John Dory 42	12.83	Thorry Gunnersen	3:15:43:19
3	B	5995	Nips-N-Tux	New South Wales	Jeppersen IMX 40	12.10	Howard De Torres	3:15:48:13
4	B	R33	Chutzpah	(Victoria (state)) Victoria	Murray Burns Dovell Sydney 38	11.60	Bruce Taylor	3:15:58:45
5	C	MH106	Impeccable	New South Wales	Peterson 3/4 Tonner IOR	10.20	John Walker	3:16:40:31
6	B	SM2	Another Challenge	(Victoria (state)) Victoria	Murray Burns Dovell Sydney 38	11.78	Lou Abrahams	3:16:45:00
7	C	533	Pippin	Tasmania	Farr 37	11.40	David Taylor	3:16:51:48
8	B	6565	Team Lexus	New South Wales	Murray Burns Dovell Sydney 38	11.78	Rupert Henry	3:17:28:27
9	C	R1111	Toecutter	(Victoria (state)) Victoria	Hick 31	9.45	Robert Hick	3:17:35:55
10	B	HI8	Asylum	Queensland	Murray Burns Dovell Sydney 38	11.78	Wayne Kirkpatrick	3:17:44:49
11	B	8338	AFR Midnight Rambler	New South Wales	Jutson Northshore 369	11.20	Ed Psaltis; Bob Thomas	3:17:45:39
12	C	294	Love & War	New South Wales	Sparkman & Stephens S&S 47	14.21	Peter Kurts	3:17:59:37
13	A	8833	Bounder	(United Kingdom) Great Britain	Farr 49	15.28	Chris Little	3:18:07:28
14	B	558	Interum	Tasmania	Lyons 41	12.17	Craig King	3:18:59:24
15	A	AUS6606	Quest	New South Wales	Nelson Marek 46	14.19	Robert Steel	3:19:28:49
16	C	5350	Matangi	Tasmania	Frers 39	11.78	David Stephenson	3:19:34:46
17	A	1836	Yendys	New South Wales	Judel Vroljik JV52	15.75	Geoff Ross	3:19:45:34
18	B	8383	Krakatoa	New South Wales	Young 31	9.54	Rod Skellet	3:20:16:51
19	B	4100	Terra Firma	(Victoria (state)) Victoria	Murray 41	12.48	Nicholas Bartels; Martin Vaughan	3:20:26:11
20	A	SA3300	Secret Mens Business	South Australia	Reichel Pugh 46	12.75	Geoff Boettcher	3:20:50:36
21	A	8880	Ichi Ban	New South Wales	Farr 52	15.79	Matt Allen	3:20:55:08
22	B	8448	Loki	New South Wales	Frers Swan 48	14.83	Stephen Ainsworth	3:21:06:19
23	C	4057	Aurora	New South Wales	Farr 40	12.19	Jim Holley	3:21:17:58
24	C	S4440	Midnight Rambler II	(Victoria (state)) Victoria	Farr 40	12.24	Dennis Millikan	3:21:23:34
25	B	A8	Mirrabooka	Tasmania	Frers 47	13.40	John Bennetto	3:21:27:52
26	B	R69	Fuzzy Logic	(Victoria (state)) Victoria	Murray Burns Dovell ILC 40	12.48	Paul Roberts; Bill Lennon	3:21:35:57
27	A	AUS70	Ragamuffin	New South Wales	Farr 50	15.50	Syd Fischer	3:21:58:48
28	A	USA16	Zaraffa	United States	Reichel Pugh 65	20.49	Skip Sheldon	3:22:17:20
29	A	93	Merlin	New South Wales	Kaiko 51 Cruiser Racer	15.60	David Forbes; Richard Brooks	3:23:13:10
30	B	SA1331	Aint Misbehavin	(United Kingdom) Great Britain	Lavranos 47	14.29	Jean Jacques Provoyeur	4:00:08:51
31	C	YC717	Liberator	South Australia	Farr 42	12.90	Geoff Catt	4:00:34:33
32	A	C1	Brindabella	New South Wales	Jutson 79	24.08	George Snow	4:00:40:39
33	A	NOR2	Andrew Short Marine	New South Wales	Davidson Volvo Ocean 60	19.44	Andrew Short	4:00:47:35
34	B	9477	Shere Khan	New South Wales	Farr Beneteau First 47.7	15.50	Richard Wyatt; Graeme Fraser	4:01:03:03
35	A	HY6572	Ice Fire	Western Australia	Mummery 45	13.85	Hans Butter	4:01:26:51
36	C	F88	Degrees of Freedom	Western Australia	Runnalls 38	11.60	Mike Reynolds	4:05:57:51
37	C	371	Berrimilla	New South Wales	Joubert Brolga 33	10.10	Alex Whitworth	4:15:34:59
DNF	B	6081	Dodo	New South Wales	Murray Burns Dovell Sydney 38	11.78	Adrian Dunphy	Retired-Mainsail Damage
DNF	A	SM9797	Dysons Cobb & Co	(Victoria (state)) Victoria	Farr 47	14.32	Chris Dare	Retired-Broken Mast
