= Chris Amon Racing =

New Zealand-British Formula One team

Amon
- Full name: (New Zealand) Chris Amon Racing
- Base: New Zealand
- Founder(s): Chris Amon
- Noted staff: John Dalton; Gordon Fowell
- Noted drivers: (New Zealand) Chris Amon (Australia) Larry Perkins

Formula One World Championship career
- First entry: 1966 Italian Grand Prix
- Races entered: 5
- Constructors: Brabham-BRM; Amon-Ford
- Drivers' Championships: 0
- Race victories: 0
- Pole positions: 0
- Fastest laps: 0
- Final entry: 1974 Italian Grand Prix

Chris Amon Racing, also known simply as Amon, was a Formula One team established by New Zealand driver Chris Amon. It competed as a privateer team in the 1966 Italian Grand Prix, then as a constructor in its own right in the 1974 Formula One season.

== Background ==
Chris Amon made his Formula One debut in 1963, driving for Reg Parnell's privateer team. After finding himself without a full-time drive in 1966, he entered a Brabham BT11 powered by a 2-litre BRM engine at the Italian Grand Prix, under the banner of "Chris Amon Racing". With most of the other cars running 3-litre engines, Amon struggled in qualifying and failed to make the grid.

From 1967 until 1972, Amon drove for Ferrari, March and Matra, winning several non-championship F1 races while developing a reputation for bad luck in World Championship events. He then struggled in 1973 with the small Italian Tecno team. But encouraged by the potential of the underdeveloped Gordon Fowell chassis, Amon tried running his own Formula One car in 1974. Financial backing came from John Dalton, and the car, designed by Fowell, followed the Lotus 72 in some areas of construction, with sophisticated torsion-bar suspension and side radiators.

The venture failed completely: retiring from the first race, Amon withdrew from the second, and the car was unable to qualify for two more before the team closed down due to financial problems.

== Amon AF101 ==
Amon AF101
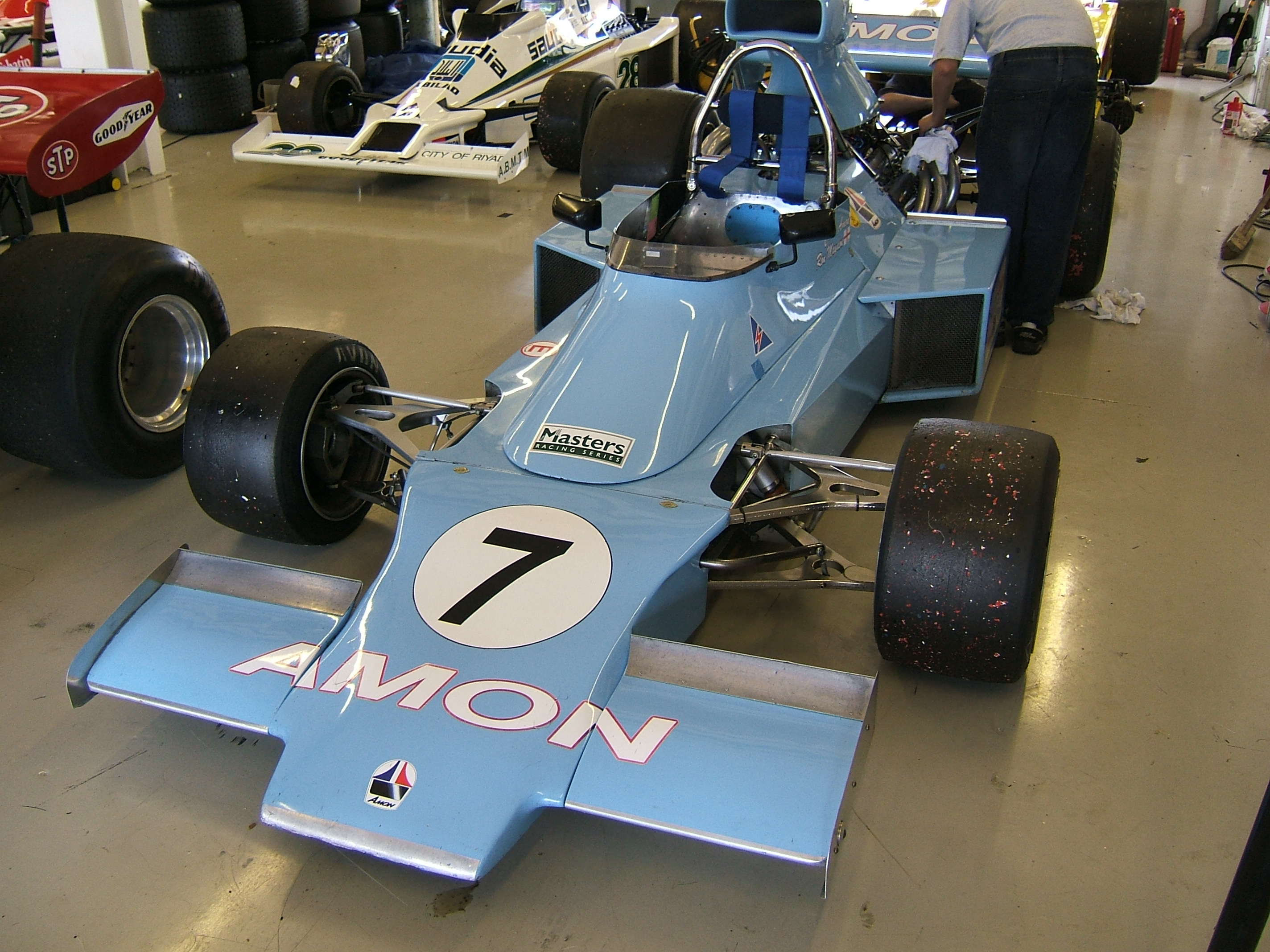
- The Amon F1 car.
- Category: Formula One
- Constructor: Chris Amon Racing
- Designers: Gordon Fowell (Technical Director); Tom Boyce (Chief Designer)

Technical specifications
- Chassis: Aluminium monocoque, with engine as a fully stressed member.
- Engine: Ford Cosworth DFV 2,993 cc (182.6 cu in) 90° V8, naturally aspirated, mid-mounted.
- Transmission: Hewland FG 400 5-speed manual gearbox, with Borg & Beck clutch.
- Tyres: Firestone

Competition history
- Notable entrants: Chris Amon Racing
- Notable drivers: (New Zealand) Chris Amon (Australia) Larry Perkins
- Debut: 1974 Spanish Grand Prix
| Races | Wins | Poles | F/Laps |
|---|---|---|---|
| 4 | 0 | 0 | 0 |
- Unless otherwise stated, all data refer to Formula One World Championship Grands Prix only.

The AF101 was the only Formula One car built by Amon Racing; the AF101 designation deriving from A for Amon and F for Fowell. Fowell and Tom Boyce designed the car which featured a single central fuel tank, titanium torsion bars and a forward driving position. One unusual (for the time) feature of the AF101 was that the fuel tank was located between the driver's cockpit and the engine. Structurally, it proved to be weak and was not ready for a Formula One appearance until the fourth race of the season, the Spanish Grand Prix. Amon was only able to qualify 23rd, due to brake-disc vibration that became worse with the tyres required for the wet race that followed. Despite cautious driving, a brake shaft finally broke and Amon was forced to retire after 22 laps.

Following further work and testing, Amon returned for the Monaco Grand Prix and qualified twentieth, but due to mechanical problems, he was unable to start the race. Further problems meant Amon was not able to reappear with the AF101 until the German Grand Prix when both Amon and Larry Perkins failed to qualify. Amon did not reappear with the AF101 until the Italian Grand Prix, three races before the end of the season, but this time he was unable to qualify. That signalled the end of both the car and Chris Amon Racing, leaving Amon to close down the team after the race when the money ran out.

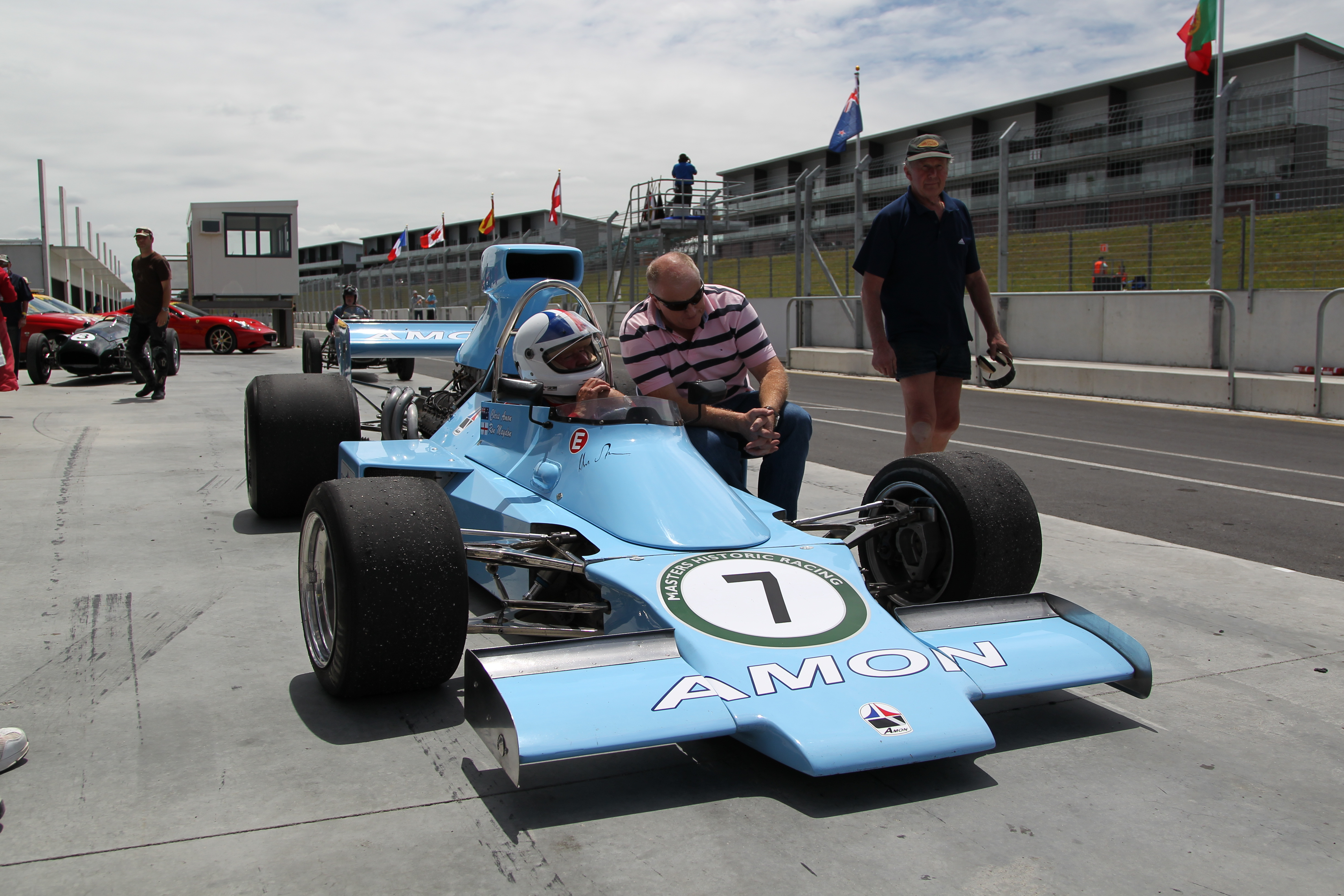
Chris Amon in the AF101 at the NZ Festival of Motor Racing 2011

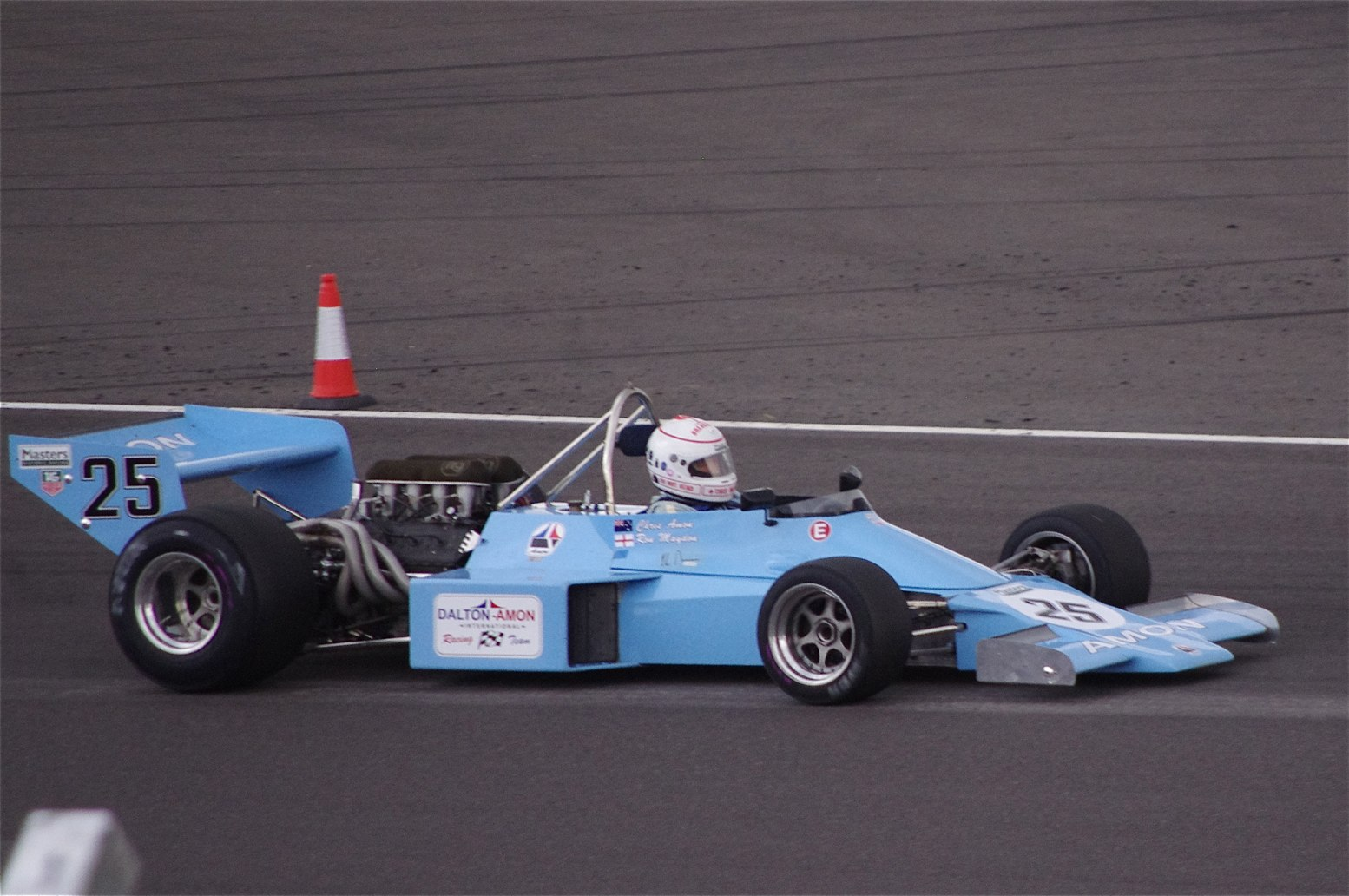
The AF101 at Silverstone in 2012

== Complete Formula One results ==
(key)

| Year | Entrant | Chassis | Engine | Tyres | Drivers | 1 | 2 | 3 | 4 | 5 | 6 | 7 | 8 | 9 | 10 | 11 | 12 | 13 | 14 | 15 | Points | WCC |
|---|---|---|---|---|---|---|---|---|---|---|---|---|---|---|---|---|---|---|---|---|---|---|
| 1966 | Chris Amon Racing | Brabham BT11 | BRM V8 | D | | MON | BEL | FRA | GBR | NED | GER | ITA | USA | MEX | | | | | | | 0 | NC |
| 1966 | Chris Amon Racing | Brabham BT11 | BRM V8 | D | Chris Amon | | | | | | | DNQ | | | | | | | | | 0 | NC |
| 1974 | Dalton-Amon International | Amon AF101 | Cosworth V8 | F | | ARG | BRA | RSA | ESP | BEL | MON | SWE | NED | FRA | GBR | GER | AUT | ITA | CAN | USA | 0 | NC |
| 1974 | Dalton-Amon International | Amon AF101 | Cosworth V8 | F | Chris Amon | | | | Ret | | DNS | | | | | DNQ | | DNQ | | | 0 | NC |
| 1974 | Dalton-Amon International | Amon AF101 | Cosworth V8 | F | Larry Perkins | | | | | | | | | | | DNQ | | | | | 0 | NC |

== Non-Championship results ==
(key)

| Year | Entrant | Engine | Tyres | Driver | 1 | 2 | 3 |
|---|---|---|---|---|---|---|---|
| 1974 | Chris Amon Racing | Ford Cosworth DFV | F | | PRE | ROC | INT |
| 1974 | Chris Amon Racing | Ford Cosworth DFV | F | Chris Amon | | | DNS |
