= 1979 Australian Rallycross Championship =

The 1979 Australian Rallycross Championship was a CAMS sanctioned Australian motor racing title which was contested on 24 June 1979 at Tailem Bend Raceway near Tailem Bend in South Australia. It was the inaugural Australian Rallycross Championship, and is, as of 2026, the only such title to have been recognised by the Confederation of Australian Motor Sport.

The championship was won by Larry Perkins driving a Volkswagen Beetle for Kruger Motors.

== Championship classification ==
Position	Driver	Car	Entrant
1	Larry Perkins	Volkswagen Beetle	Kruger Motors
2	Keith Poole	Volkswagen Beetle	Kruger Motors
3	Phil March	Datsun 510	
?	Rod Morris	Morris Cooper S	
?	Bob Lenholm	Ford Cortina Lotus	
?	Steve Blee	Renault R8 Gordini	

Following a number of qualifying heats, six drivers contested the championship final.
