= Henry Vere Barclay =

Explorer

Henry Vere Barclay (1845–1917) was an English explorer, naval officer, and surveyor. He was best known as being an explorer of Central Australia.

== Biography ==
Barclay was born in Lancashire, England on 6 January 1845. He joined the Royal Marines as a lieutenant and served for many years as a naval surveyor; in 1863 he was deployed to South America, in 1871 to Tasmania, and to South Australia in 1877. From 1904 to 1905 Barclay participated in the Barclay-McPherson expedition to survey the Northern Territories, and in 1911 surveyed prospective routes for railways in Queensland and New South Wales. He was noted for being critical of the Hermannsburg Mission's activities in the Northern Territories. He died in the United Kingdom in 1917.

=== Cache discovery ===
In 2017 a cache of equipment (dated to 1904) belonging to Barclay was discovered in the Simpson Desert of Central Australia. Notably, the cache was recovered by Australian former race car driver Larry Perkins and his brother Peter Perkins.
