= Skandia (2003 yacht) =

2003 Sydney to Hobart Yacht Race

- Other names: Wild Thing Arca
- Yacht club: Mornington Yacht Club
- Nation: Australia
- Designer(s): Don Jones
- Builder: Hart Marine

Racing career
- Skippers: Grant Wharington
- Notable victories: 2003 Sydney–Hobart (l.h.); 2004 Brisbane-Gladstone (l.h.)

Specifications
- Length: 30 m (98 ft) (LOA)
- Beam: 4.9 m (16 ft)
- Draft: 5 m (16 ft)

Skandia (rechristened Wild Thing and Arca in 2019) is a 100 ft maxi yacht built in 2003. She was designed by Don Jones. She won line hours in the 2003 Sydney to Hobart Yacht Race skippered by Grant Wharington.
