= 1985 Australian Touring Car Championship =

Motor racing competition

Seasons
- ← 1984 1986 →

The 1985 Australian Touring Car Championship was a CAMS sanctioned motor racing title for drivers of Touring Cars. It was the 26th running of the Australian Touring Car Championship and the first to be contested using regulations based on the FIA's International Group A regulations after having been run under CAMS home grown Group C rules between 1973 and 1984. The championship began on 10 February 1985 at Winton Motor Raceway (the track's first ever ATCC race) and ended on 14 July at Oran Park Raceway after ten rounds.

The championship was won for the first of an eventual 4 times by expatriate Kiwi and now Melbourne resident Jim Richards driving a BMW 635 CSi for Frank Gardner's JPS Team BMW with Jim being the first New Zealander to ever win the ATCC. 1985 was also the first time that a car from either Europe or the UK had won the ATCC since 4 time series champion Bob Jane had won his second title in a British built Jaguar Mk.II 4.1 in 1963.

== Season summary ==
Triple Bathurst winner Jim Richards won his and BMW's first Australian Touring Car Championship driving a 3.5-litre 6 cyl BMW 635 CSi entered by JPS Team BMW. Defending champion Dick Johnson placed second in his Ford Mustang (the first time a Mustang had been seen in the ATCC since 1973), with Peter Brock finishing third in his Holden VK Commodore.

The first round of the series at Winton also created history when for the first time since the ATCC was first held in 1960, no Holden of any sort was on the grid. The only running Group A Commodore at the time was the Brock's Holden Dealer Team car that had raced in Nissan-Mobil 500 series in New Zealand in January and February, but had missed the Winton round as it was still on the boat heading back to Melbourne. The race also saw the first ever ATCC race win by a BMW with Richards, driving the full Group A 1984 Bathurst 635 (driven at Bathurst by ex-F1 champ Denny Hulme and Bavarian Prince Leopold von Bayern), winning by a lap from his new JPS teammate, fellow New Zealander Neville Crichton (like Brock's Commodore, Crichton's own ex-Alpina BMW 635, fresh from winning the Nissan-Mobil series, was still on its way to Australia so at Winton he drove the JPS team's spare, the converted ex-1984 Group C 635). Richards' win in the BMW also saw the first ATCC round win by a European car since Jim McKeown won the 7th and final round of the 1970 ATCC at Symmons Plains in a Porsche 911S.

Although both Jim Richards and Neville Crichton ran under and were fully maintained by Frank Gardner's JPS Team BMW which was based in the suburb of Terrey Hills in Sydney, both cars in fact had separate JPS sponsorship through the respective Australian and New Zealand arms of Amatil.

Swedish marque Volvo also joined the winners list when Kiwi Robbie Francevic won Round 3 at Symmons Plains in Tasmania in a Volvo 240T turbo owned by his friend, Auckland millionaire of mechanical seals designer and manufacturer (and sometimes race driver) Mark Petch. Still a resident of Auckland, Francevic's win also saw him become the first non-Australian resident to win an ATCC race. The big Kiwi's win in Tasmania in the Volvo (which Dick Johnson referred to as a "Swedish Valiant" on RaceCam during Ch.7's telecast) was also the first of what would be an eventual 55 ATCC round wins (out of a possible 72) for cars powered by turbocharged engines up until the end of Group A racing in 1992. It was not the first turbocharged car to win an ATCC race however, as George Fury had won the Lakeside round in 1984 in a Nissan Bluebird Turbo. Although the other drivers and teams knew the speed potential of the turbo Volvo with it winning races in the European Touring Car Championship, as well as Francevic and Belgian jeweller Michel Delcourt winning the inaugural Wellington 500 in New Zealand earlier in the year in the same car, Francevic's win at Symmons Plains over the big Holden and Ford V8's still came as something of a culture shock to Australian race fans.

Richards (Winton, Wanneroo, Adelaide, Calder, Surfers, Lakeside and Amaroo, which staged its first ATCC race since 1978), Brock (Sandown) and Francevic (Symmons Plains and Oran Park) were the only drivers to win a race in the series. That actually gave New Zealand born drivers 9 wins out of the 10 rounds, a record for non-Australian wins that still stands as of 2016.

Jim Richards and John Smith in his Toyota Team Australia Corolla were the only drivers to finish each round of the series. Smith won the Up to 2000cc class at the first nine rounds of the series before finishing a close second behind teammate Drew Price in the final round at Oran Park.

Other drivers/cars who made an impression in Australia's first foray into Group A included Sydney privateer Garry Willmington in his privately entered Jaguar XJS (built from a second hand road car) with its 5.3 litre, V12 engine which proved fast but underdone thanks to Willmington's small budget. The Jaguar was often the fastest car in a straight line when it appeared (e.g. on the 900+ metre straights at Sandown and Adelaide), but Willmington's lack of budget to develop the car saw it lack both the reliability and the handling needed to be competitive on the smaller Australian tracks. Also impressing were Perth based expat Kiwi Tim Slako in an ex-Andy Rouse BTCC Rover Vitesse powered by a 3.5 litre V8, another Kiwi in Jim Richards' JPS teammate Neville Crichton in his BMW, and yet another Kiwi Kent Baigent who joined the series in Adelaide driving his ex-Schnitzer Motorsport BMW 635. Also impressing with giant killing performances was 1980 Formula One World Champion Alan Jones in Colin Bond's second Network Alfa team Alfa Romeo GTV6. Jones, in an Luigi Racing (ETCC) built GTV6 generally out-performed Bond who drove his Alfa which had been converted from Group E to Group A specification in 1984. Jones, contesting his first ever ATCC finished 8th in the championship despite not contesting the final three rounds (Jones would return full-time to F1 in late 1985). Don Smith and Lawrie Nelson both drove a privately entered Ford Mustang each, and even though they would on occasions both achieve decent results in qualifying, lack of reliability and funding kept them well off the pace of Johnson's front running Greens-Tuf Zakespeed Ford Mustang GT.

== Teams and drivers ==
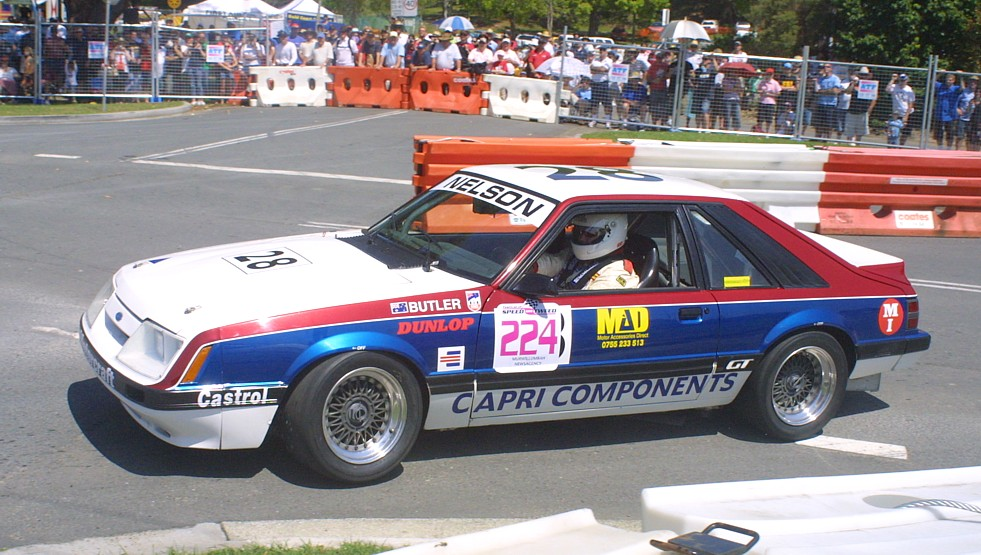
Lawrie Nelson's Ford Mustang

The following drivers and teams competed in the 1985 Australian Touring Car Championship.

Team	Car	Class	No	Driver
Masterton Homes	Holden VK Commodore	3001 to 6000cc	2	(Australia) Steve Masterton
H. Kent Baigent	BMW 635 CSi	2001 to 3000cc	3	(New Zealand) Kent Baigent
Mobil Holden Dealer Team	Holden VK Commodore	3001 to 6000cc	05	(Australia) Peter Brock (Australia) John Harvey*
Mobil Holden Dealer Team	Holden VK Commodore	3001 to 6000cc	7	(Australia) Peter Brock* (Australia) John Harvey (Australia) Larry Perkins (Australia) David Parsons
Toyota Team Australia	Toyota Corolla	Up to 2000cc	10	(Australia) John Smith
Toyota Team Australia	Toyota Corolla	Up to 2000cc	11	(Australia) Drew Price
Garry Willmington Performance	Jaguar XJ-S	3001 to 6000cc	12	(Australia) Garry Willmington
Bob Holden Motors	Toyota Sprinter	Up to 2000cc	13	(Australia) Bob Holden (Australia) Mike Quinn
Palmer Tube Mills	Ford Mustang GT	3001 to 6000cc	17	(Australia) Dick Johnson
Toowong Mitsubishi	Mitsubishi Starion	2001 to 3000cc	18	(Australia) Ross Burbidge
Ken Mathews Prestige Cars	Holden VK Commodore	3001 to 6000cc	19	(Australia) Ken Mathews
Jim Keogh Automotive	Holden VK Commodore	3001 to 6000cc	20	(Australia) Jim Keogh
Mark Petch Motorsport	Volvo 240T	2001 to 3000cc	21	(New Zealand) Robbie Francevic
Glenn Molloy	BMW 635 CSi	3001 to 6000cc	22	(New Zealand) Glenn Molloy
BMW Australia	BMW 323i	2001 to 3000cc	23	(Australia) Tony Longhurst
Network Alfa	Alfa Romeo GTV6	2001 to 3000cc	26	(Australia) Colin Bond
Network Alfa	Alfa Romeo GTV6	2001 to 3000cc	27	(Australia) Alan Jones
The Toy Shop	Alfa Romeo GTV6	2001 to 3000cc	27	(Australia) Gregg Hansford
Keema Mazda Springwood	Mazda RX-7	2001 to 3000cc	30	(Australia) Russell Worthington
JPS Team BMW	BMW 635 CSi	3001 to 6000cc	31	(New Zealand) Neville Crichton
JPS Team BMW	BMW 635 CSi	3001 to 6000cc	62	(New Zealand) Jim Richards
Motorsport Performance	Ford Mustang GT	3001 to 6000cc	33	(Australia) Don Smith
Ken Harrison	Ford Escort Mk.II	Up to 2000cc	34	(Australia) Ken Harrison
Mike Minear Racing	Volvo 360GLT	Up to 2000cc	36	(Australia) Mike Minear
Jagparts	Triumph Dolomite Sprint	Up to 2000cc	49	(Australia) Martin Power
Chris Heyer	Audi 5+5	2001 to 3000cc	53	(Australia) Chris Heyer
JL Hazelton	Ford Capri Mk.III	2001 to 3000cc	57	(Australia) Laurie Hazelton
Capri Components	Ford Mustang GT	3001 to 6000cc	64	(Australia) Lawrie Nelson
John Craft	Ford Capri Mk.III	2001 to 3000cc	65	(Australia) John Craft
Ralliart Australia	Mitsubishi Starion	2001 to 3000cc	66	(Australia) Kevin Bartlett
Greville Arnel	Mitsubishi Starion	2001 to 3000cc	68	(Australia) Greville Arnel
Raymond Spencer	Mazda RX-7	2001 to 3000cc	70	(Australia) Raymond Spencer
Ian Thompson	BMW 323i	2001 to 3000cc	77	(Australia) Ian Thompson
Peter Williamson Toyota	Toyota Celica Supra	2001 to 3000cc	77	(Australia) Peter Williamson
Melbourne Brake & Clutch	Mitsubishi Starion	2001 to 3000cc	78	(Australia) Brian Sampson
Phil Parsons	Ford Capri Mk.III	2001 to 3000cc	79	(Australia) Phil Parsons
Alf Barbagallo	Rover Vitesse	3001 to 6000cc	96	(New Zealand) Tim Slako

* Peter Brock and John Harvey both drove #05 and #7 during the season.

== Race calendar ==
The 1985 Australian Touring Car Championship was contested over a ten-round series with one race per round.

Rd.	Race title	Circuit	Location / state	Date	Winner	Team	Report
1		Winton Motor Raceway	(Victoria (state)) Benalla, Victoria	9–10 Feb	Jim Richards	JPS Team BMW	
2	Pye Audio Touring Car Race	Sandown International Raceway	(Victoria (state)) Melbourne, Victoria	23–24 Feb	Peter Brock	Mobil Holden Dealer Team	
3		Symmons Plains Raceway	Launceston, Tasmania	10–11 Mar	Robbie Francevic	Mark Petch Motorsport	
4		Wanneroo Park	Perth, Western Australia	30–31 Mar	Jim Richards	JPS Team BMW	
5	Motorcraft 100	Adelaide International Raceway	Virginia, South Australia	20–21 Apr	Jim Richards	JPS Team BMW	
6	Eurovox Trophy	Calder Park Raceway	(Victoria (state)) Melbourne, Victoria	27–28 Apr	Jim Richards	JPS Team BMW	
7	Gold Coast Bulletin Centenary Trophy	Surfers Paradise International Raceway	Surfers Paradise, Queensland	18–19 May	Jim Richards	JPS Team BMW	
8	FM104 Trophy	Lakeside International Raceway	Brisbane, Queensland	22–23 Jun	Jim Richards	JPS Team BMW	
9	Better Brakes 100	Amaroo Park	Sydney, New South Wales	6–7 Jul	Jim Richards	JPS Team BMW	
10	Castrol Grand Final	Oran Park Raceway	Sydney, New South Wales	12–13 Jul	Robbie Francevic	Mark Petch Motorsport	

== Classes ==
Cars competed in three classes determined by engine capacity.

- Up to 2000cc
- 2001 to 3000cc
- 3001 to 6000cc

== Points system ==
Championship points were allocated on a three tier system, to Australian license holders only, for outright places gained in each round:

- Scale A was applied to drivers of cars in the Up to 2000cc class
- Scale B was applied to drivers of cars in the 2001 to 3000cc class
- Scale C was applied to drivers of cars in the 3001 to 6000cc class

Outright Position	1	2	3	4	5	6	7	8	9	10	11	12	13	14	15	16	17	18	19	20
Scale A	30	27	24	21	19	17	15	14	13	12	11	10	9	8	7	6	5	4	3	2
Scale B	28	26	23	20	17	15	14	13	12	11	10	9	8	7	6	5	4	3	2	1
Scale C	25	23	20	17	15	13	11	10	9	8	7	6	5	4	3	2	1	–	–	–

Points from the best nine round results were retained by each driver, any other points not being included in the nett total.

== Results ==
Pos	Driver	Car	Win.	San.	Sym.	Wan.	Ade.	Cal.	Sur.	Lak.	Ama.	Ora.	Pts.
1	Jim Richards	BMW 635 CSi	1st	2nd	5th	1st	1st	1st	1st	1st	1st	3rd	218 (233)
2	Dick Johnson	Ford Mustang GT	Ret	3rd	2nd	3rd	3rd	2nd	4th	2nd	2nd	2nd	192
3	Peter Brock	Holden VK Commodore		1st	4th	2nd	2nd	Ret	3rd	3rd	5th	8th	153
4	Neville Crichton	BMW 635 CSi	2nd	5th	3rd	4th	4th	3rd	5th	6th	9th	Ret	149
5	Robbie Francevic	Volvo 240T		6th	1st	9th	Ret	7th	2nd	4th	Ret	1st	143
6	Colin Bond	Alfa Romeo GTV6	Ret	12th	8th	8th	6th	6th	16th	5th	4th	4th	127
7	John Smith	Toyota Corolla	7th	9th	10th	11th	12th	11th	10th	8th	10th	15th	110 (117)
8	Alan Jones	Alfa Romeo GTV6	4th	4th	7th	6th	16th	4th	7th	DNS			108
9	Kevin Bartlett	Mitsubishi Starion	3rd	8th	DNS	7th	8th	9th	DNS	DNS			75
10	Bob Holden	Toyota Sprinter	8th	15th	11th	12th	14th	14th	15th		15th	Ret	72
11	Jim Keogh	Holden VK Commodore		7th	6th	10th	17th	Ret	11th	9th	12th		54
12	Kent Baigent	BMW 635 CSi					5th	8th	8th	Ret	7th	13th	51
13	Drew Price	Toyota Sprinter					13th	12th		10th	11th	14th	50
14	Brian Sampson	Mitsubishi Starion	5th	11th	Ret			10th			20th	11th	48
15	Tim Slako	Rover Vitesse				5th	9th				8th	6th	47
16	Tony Longhurst	BMW 323i								7th	3rd	12th	46
17	Mike Minear	Volvo 360GLT	10th	Ret	12th		18th	16th					41
18	Laurie Hazelton	Ford Capri Mk.III	9th	Ret			11th				13th		35
19	Lawrie Nelson	Ford Mustang GT	6th	16th	9th		10th	Ret					32
20	John Harvey	Holden VK Commodore						5th				5th	30
21	Steve Masterton	Holden VK Commodore						Ret	9th	Ret	Ret	7th	20
22	Russell Worthington	Mazda RX-7							13th	11th			18
23	Ross Burbidge	Mitsubishi Starion							14th	12th			16
24	Peter Williamson	Toyota Celica Supra					7th			Ret	18th	Ret	14
25	Larry Perkins	Holden VK Commodore							6th	Ret			13
=	David Parsons	Holden VK Commodore									6th		13
27	Garry Willmington	Jaguar XJ-S	Ret	18th			15th				Ret	9th	12
28	Greville Arnel	Mitsubishi Starion	Ret	10th					Ret				11
=	Gregg Hansford	Alfa Romeo GTV6										10th	11
=	Ken Mathews	Holden VK Commodore						13th	12th				11
=	Martin Power	Triumph Dolomite Sprint		14th			19th						11
32	Raymond Spencer	Mazda RX-7		13th									8
33	Ken Harrison	Ford Escort Mk.II		17th			Ret	15th					7
=	John Craft	Ford Capri Mk.III									14th		7
35	Chris Heyer	Audi 5+5									16th		5
36	Phil Parsons	Ford Capri Mk.III									17th		4
37	Phil Lamour	Triumph Dolomite Sprint										19th	3
38	Ian Thompson	BMW 323i		Ret			20th						1
=	Brian Potts	Holden VK Commodore										17th	1
Pos	Driver	Car	Win.	San.	Sym.	Wan.	Ade.	Cal.	Sur.	Lak.	Ama.	Ora.	Pts

Colour	Result
Gold	Winner
Silver	Second place
Bronze	Third place
Green	Points classification
Blue	Non-points classification
Blue	Non-classified finish (NC)
Purple	Retired, not classified (Ret)
Red	Did not qualify (DNQ)
Red	Did not pre-qualify (DNPQ)
Black	Disqualified (DSQ)
White	Did not start (DNS)
White	Withdrew (WD)
White	Race cancelled (C)
Blank	Did not practice (DNP)
Blank	Did not arrive (DNA)
Blank	Excluded (EX)

== See also ==
- 1985 Australian Touring Car season
