= Larry Perkins =

Australian racing driver (born 1950)

Larry Perkins AM
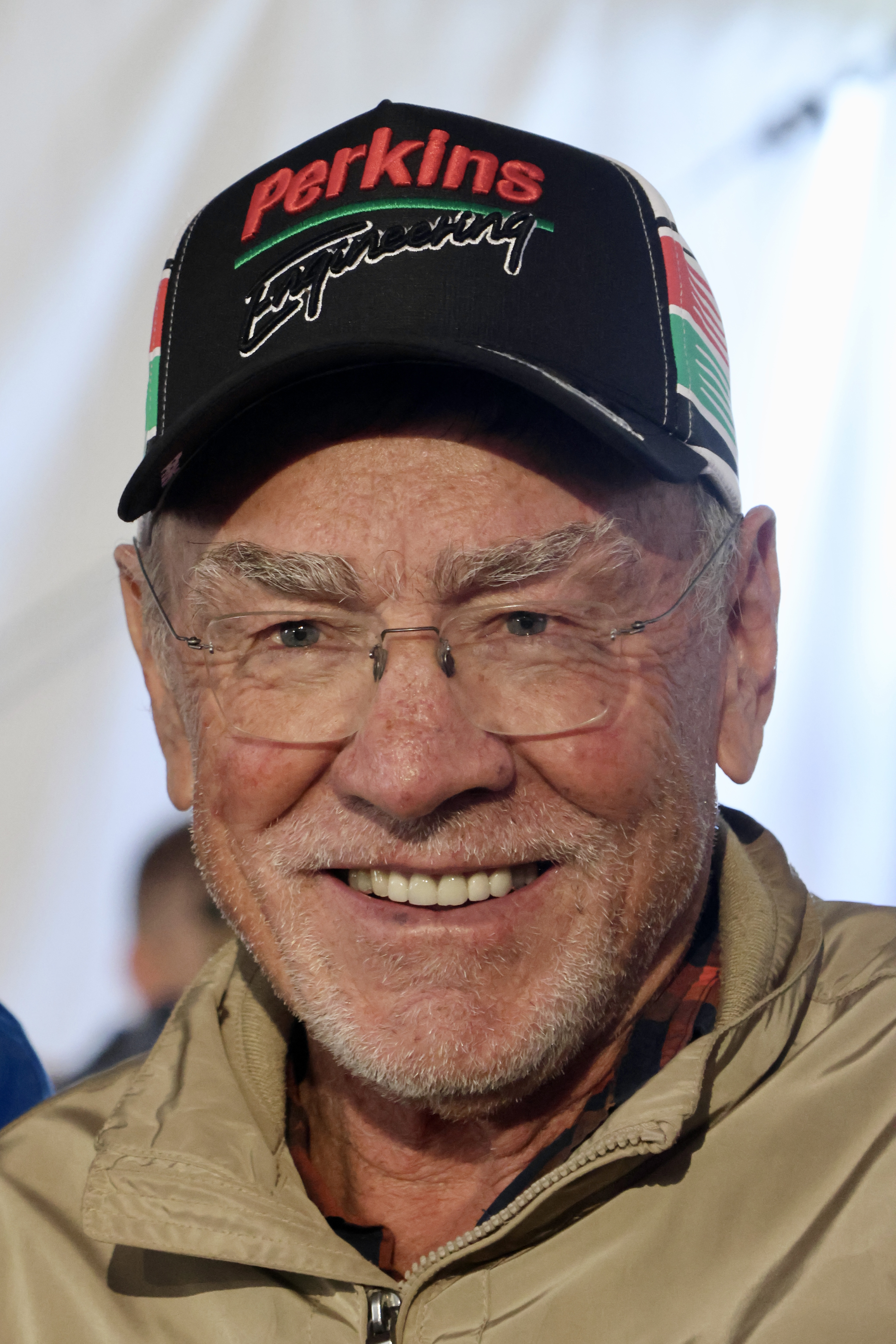
- Perkins at the 2025 Adelaide Grand Final
- Born: Larry Clifton Perkins; 18 March 1950 (age 76); Murrayville, Victoria, Australia
- Spouse: Raelene Perkins
- Children: 2; including Jack Perkins
- Relatives: George Reynolds (uncle)
- Awards: Full list

Australian Touring Car Championship
- Years active: 1981, 1985–2003
- Teams: Holden Dealer Team; Perkins Engineering
- Starts: 320
- Wins: 8
- Podiums: 38
- Poles: 1
- Best finish: 4th in 1994, 1995, 1998

Formula One World Championship career
- Nationality: (Australia) Australian
- Active years: 1974, 1976–1977
- Team(s): Amon, Boro, Brabham, BRM, Surtees
- Entries: 15 (11 starts)
- Championships: 0
- Wins: 0
- Podiums: 0
- Career points: 0
- Pole positions: 0
- Fastest laps: 0
- First entry: 1974 German Grand Prix
- Last entry: 1977 French Grand Prix

Championship titles
- 1975; 1979; 1979: FIA European F3; Rothmans International; Australian Rallycross

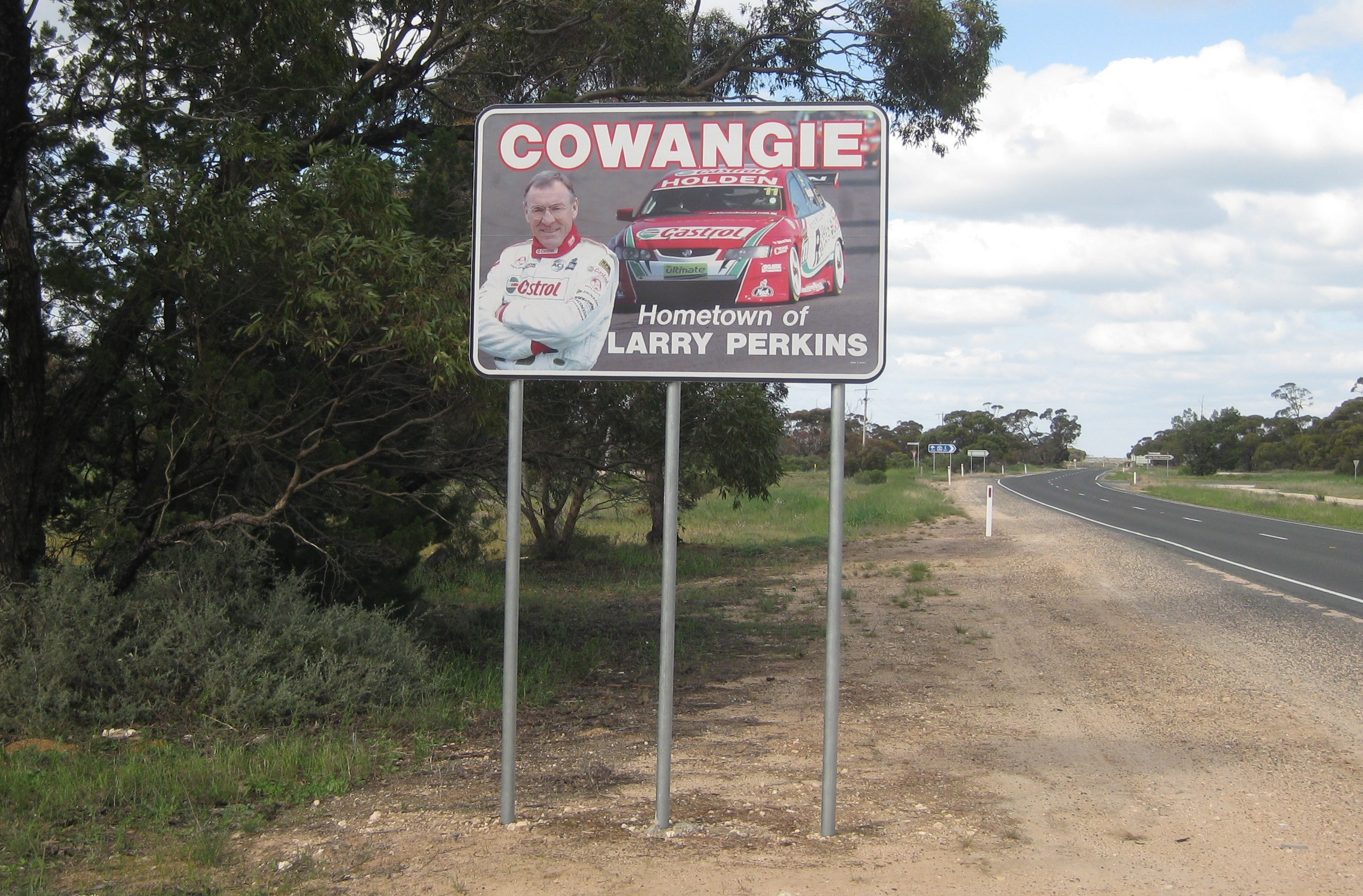
Sign proclaiming Cowangie to be the "Hometown of Larry Perkins"

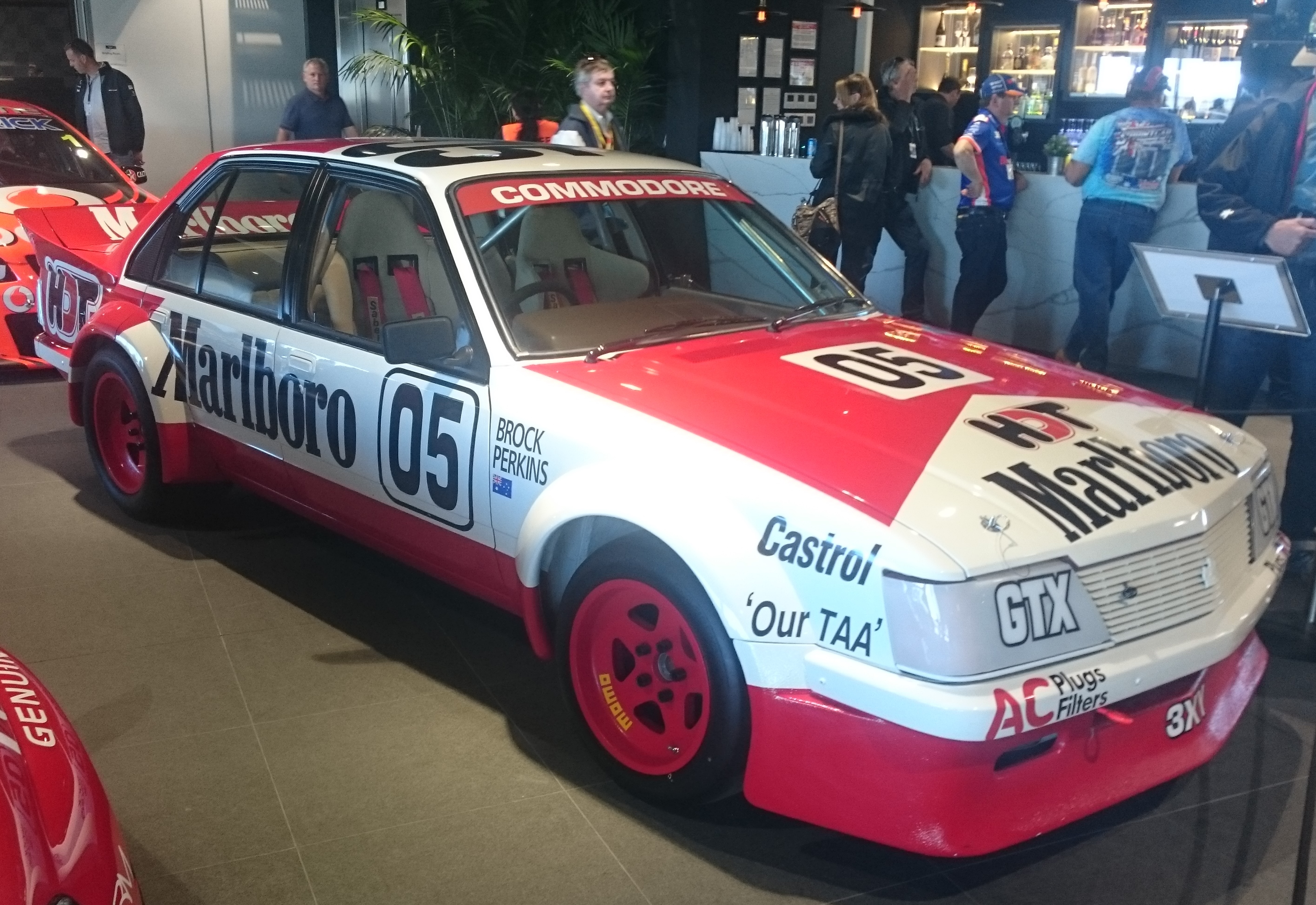
Perkins placed eighth in the 1983 Australian Endurance Championship driving a Holden Commodore VH

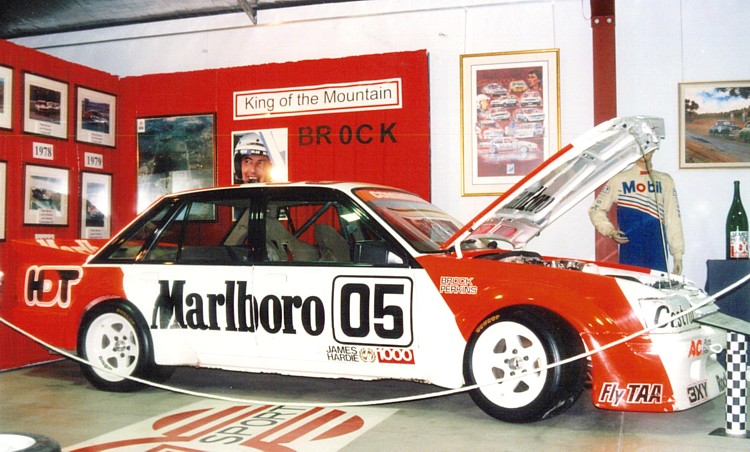
The 1984 Bathurst 1000 winning Holden Commodore

Larry Clifton Perkins AM (born 18 March 1950) is a former racing driver and V8 Supercar team owner from Australia.

== Biography ==
=== Early years ===
Growing up on a farm in Cowangie in the Mallee region of Victoria, Larry, the son of racing driver Eddie Perkins who had won the 1956 RedeX Round Australia Trial and maternal nephew of Bathurst 500-winner George Reynolds, developed a love for cars from a young age and loved tinkering with the farm machinery. In 1970 he was recruited as a mechanic/driver for Harry Firth's Holden Dealer Team, and although he didn't do much road racing for the team, he did race in Rallycross alongside team driver Peter Brock, and was also involved with the development of the stillborn Holden LJ Torana GTR XU-1 V8 project which was canned in mid-1972 by the "Supercar scare".

=== Racing career ===
After winning the TAA Formula Ford "Driver To Europe" Series in 1971 and the Australian Formula 2 Championship in 1972 (both times in an Elfin 600), Perkins travelled to Europe where he won the 1975 European Formula Three Championship. He also raced in Formula One during the 1974, 1976 and 1977 seasons. After failing to secure a permanent drive in Formula One he returned to Australia, winning the Rothmans International Series in 1979 in an Elfin MR8 for the Ansett Team Elfin factory team run by Elfin Sports Cars founder Garrie Cooper, and the 1979 Australian Rallycross Championship in a Volkswagen Beetle. During 1982 and 1983 he worked with brother Garry on the construction of The Quiet Achiever solar car. He was one of the drivers of the car during the transcontinental solar crossing of Australia, the car using only a photovoltaic solar cell source. During these years, he met with success in Australian Touring Cars, and in 1988, he returned to Europe to race at the Le Mans 24 Hour with Tom Walkinshaw Racing, finishing fourth.

After returning home from Europe, Perkins made his Bathurst 1000 debut in 1977 in a Holden LX Torana SS A9X Hatchback where he finished third with Peter Janson. He went on to win the race six times (1982, 1983, 1984, 1993, 1995, 1997), with co-drivers Peter Brock (1982–84), John Harvey (1983) (all for the Holden Dealer Team which by then was owned by Brock with Perkins in charge of race car building and preparation), Gregg Hansford (1993) and in his last two wins in 1995 and 1997 with Russell Ingall, winning each time in an Australian developed Holden Commodore.

Arguably Perkins' most memorable win was in the 1995 Tooheys 1000 in which he dropped to last place after a pit stop at the end of the first lap to replace a flat tyre, and subsequently gained the lead with less than ten laps remaining after the Ford Falcon of Glenn Seton retired having dropped a valve in the engine. Perkins and co-driver Russell Ingall thus became only the second driving combination in the history of the race to recover from last place to win the event. Perkins has however, never won an Australian Touring Car Championship, his best championship results being three fourth places.

=== Formula One ===
Perkins made his first appearance in Formula One at the 1974 German Grand Prix for Chris Amon Racing. With regular driver and team owner Chris Amon sidelined with sinusitis after just one practice lap, Perkins took over in the AF101, failing to qualify after crashing on the second day of practice.

In 1976, Perkins signed a deal with the works Boro team, for the team's first season. He made his first Formula One start at the Spanish Grand Prix, finishing 13th before achieving a seasons best result of eighth at the following race in Belgium. He failed to qualify at Monaco and retired from the Swedish Grand Prix after blowing an engine. With the team's money drying up, Perkins only made two further appearances in a Boro, retiring from the Dutch and Italian Grands Prix, and after Boro's withdrawal, was left without a drive. He replaced Carlos Reutemann at Brabham for the final three races of the year, finishing in 17th position in Canada and retiring from the remaining two races.

For the beginning of 1977, Perkins secured a drive for Stanley BRM, the remnants of the once great BRM team. After his car failed to be delivered on time for the opening Grand Prix, he made his first appearance at the Brazilian Grand Prix, albeit 12.1 seconds off the pace and retiring after one lap. Lapped five times before finishing 15th in South Africa, Perkins lost his seat to Conny Andersson at the beginning of the European season. He had a brief stint at Surtees, finishing 12th in Belgium and failing to qualify in Sweden. At the French Grand Prix, he drove in Friday practice, but was replaced by Patrick Tambay the next day. This marked the end of Perkins' brief and unsuccessful Formula One career.

=== Retirement and legacy ===
Perkins retired from driving in 2003, aged 53 and was inducted into the V8 Supercars Hall of Fame in 2008. In addition to his racing credentials as a driver he is an accomplished automotive engineer and engine-builder having built many race cars for both his own team and for other racing teams. He is well known for his outgoing and humorous personality. His nickname is "LP", but he is often referred to as "Lightning Larry" or "Larrikin Larry". Larry is the father of V8 Supercar race winner Jack Perkins.

On 7 December 2017, the "Larry Perkins Trophy" was named in his honour. It is awarded to the driver who accumulates the most points across the four races at the Beaurepaires Melbourne 400, the Supercars event supporting the Australian Grand Prix.

In 2018, Perkins and his brother Peter discovered the lost cache of equipment left behind in the Simpson Desert by explorers Henry Vere Barclay and Ronald MacPherson in 1904. The explorers had been forced to abandon the load, which included camel tanks, tools, scientific equipment and personal belongings, in order to cross sandhills to get to a water source. The Perkins' discovery was described as a "highly significant archaeological find".

In the 2021 Queen's Birthday Honours, Perkins was appointed a Member of the Order of Australia for "significant service to motorsport as a touring car driver and team owner".

== Racing record ==
=== Career summary ===
Season	Series	Position	Car	Entrant / team
1970	Formula Ford National Series	5th	Elfin 600 Ford	B.S. Stillwell & Co.
1971	National Formula Ford Driver to Europe Series	**1st**	Elfin 600 Ford	BS Stillwell & Co Pty Ltd
1972	Australian Drivers' Championship	11th	Elfin 600B Ford	Provincial Motors
1972	Australian Formula 2 Championship	**1st**	Elfin 600B Ford	Provincial Motors
1975	FIA European Formula 3 Cup	**1st**	Ralt RT1 Ford	Team Cowangie
1975	British Formula 3 Championship	5th	Ralt RT1 Ford	Team Cowangie
1978	Peter Stuyvesant International Formula Pacific Series	**2nd**	Ralt RT1 Ford	Scuderia Veloce
1978/79	Formula Pacific New Zealand International Series	**3rd**	March 78B Ford	Colin Giltrap Racing
1979	Rothmans International Series	**1st**	Elfin MR8 Chevrolet	Ansett Team Elfin
1979	Australian Rallycross Championship	**1st**	Volkswagen Beetle	Kruger Motors
1981	Australian Touring Car Championship	26th	Holden VC Commodore	Cadbury Schweppes Racing
1982	Better Brakes AMSCAR Series	10th	Holden VH Commodore SS	Holden Dealer Team
1982	Australian Endurance Championship	14th	Holden VH Commodore SS	Holden Dealer Team
1983	Australian Endurance Championship	8th	Holden VH Commodore SS	Holden Dealer Team
1984	Australian Endurance Championship	5th	Holden VK Commodore	Holden Dealer Team
1985	Australian Touring Car Championship	38th	Holden VK Commodore	Holden Dealer Team
1986	Australian Endurance Championship	24th	Holden VK Commodore SS Group A	Enzed Team Perkins
1986	South Pacific Touring Car Championship	14th	Holden VK Commodore SS Group A	Enzed Team Perkins
1987	Australian Touring Car Championship	5th	Holden VK Commodore SS Group A	Enzed Team Perkins
1988	Australian Touring Car Championship	7th	Holden VL Commodore SS Group A	Holden Special Vehicles
1988	Asia-Pacific Touring Car Championship	6th	Holden VL Commodore SS Group A	Holden Special Vehicles
1988	World Sports Prototype Championship	29th	Jaguar XJR-9	Silk Cut Jaguar
1989	Australian Touring Car Championship	17th	Holden VL Commodore SS Group A SV	Perkins Engineering
1990	Australian Touring Car Championship	11th	Holden VL Commodore SS Group A SV	Perkins Engineering
1990	Australian Endurance Championship	**2nd**	Holden VL Commodore SS Group A SV	Perkins Engineering
1991	Australian Touring Car Championship	11th	Holden VN Commodore SS Group A SV	Mobil 1 Racing
1992	Australian Touring Car Championship	10th	Holden VL Commodore SS Group A SV	Perkins Engineering
1993	Australian Touring Car Championship	12th	Holden VL Commodore SS Group A SV; Holden VP Commodore	Castrol Perkins Racing
1994	Australian Touring Car Championship	4th	Holden VP Commodore	Castrol Perkins Racing
1995	Australian Touring Car Championship	4th	Holden VR Commodore	Castrol Perkins Racing
1996	Australian Touring Car Championship	5th	Holden VR Commodore	Castrol Perkins Racing
1997	Australian Touring Car Championship	5th	Holden VS Commodore	Castrol Perkins Racing
1998	Australian Touring Car Championship	4th	Holden VS Commodore	Castrol Perkins Racing
1999	Shell Championship Series	9th	Holden VT Commodore	Castrol Perkins Racing
2000	Shell Championship Series	13th	Holden VT Commodore	Castrol Perkins Racing
2001	Shell Championship Series	14th	Holden VX Commodore	Castrol Perkins Racing
2002	V8 Supercar Championship Series	18th	Holden VX Commodore	Castrol Perkins Racing
2003	V8 Supercar Championship Series	36th	Holden VY Commodore	Castrol Perkins Racing

=== Complete Formula One World Championship results ===
(key)

Year	Entrant	Chassis	Engine	1	2	3	4	5	6	7	8	9	10	11	12	13	14	15	16	17	WDC	Points
1974	Dalton-Amon International	Amon AF101	Cosworth V8	ARG	BRA	RSA	ESP	BEL	MON	SWE	NED	FRA	GBR	GER; DNQ	AUT	ITA	CAN	USA			NC	0
1976	HB Bewaking Alarm Systems	Boro Ensign N175	Cosworth V8	BRA	RSA	USW	ESP; 13	BEL; 8	MON; DNQ	SWE; Ret	FRA	GBR	GER	AUT	NED; Ret	ITA; Ret					NC	0
1976	Martini Racing	Brabham BT45	Alfa Romeo Flat 12														CAN; 17	USA; Ret	JPN; Ret		NC	0
1977	Rotary Watches Stanley BRM	BRM P207	BRM V12	ARG	BRA; Ret																NC	0
1977	Rotary Watches Stanley BRM	BRM P201B/204	BRM V12			RSA; 15															NC	0
1977	Team Surtees	Surtees TS19	Cosworth V8				USW	ESP	MON	BEL; 12	SWE; DNQ	FRA; DNQ	GBR	GER	AUT	NED	ITA	USA	CAN	JPN	NC	0

=== Complete World Sportscar Championship results ===
(key) (Races in bold indicate pole position) (Races in italics indicate fastest lap)

Year	Team	Car	1	2	3	4	5	6	7	8	9	10	11	DC	Points
1984	Team Australia (United Kingdom) John Fitzpatrick Racing	Porsche 956B	MNZ	SIL; 21	LMS; Ret	NUR	BRA	MOS	SPA	IMO	FJI	KYL	SAN	NC	0
1988	(United States) Silk Cut Jaguar (United Kingdom) Tom Walkinshaw Racing	Jaguar XJR-9 LM	JRZ	JAR	MON	SIL	LMS; 4	BRN	BRA	NUR	SPA	FJI	SAN	29th	30

=== Complete Australian Touring Car Championship results ===
(key) (Races in bold indicate pole position) (Races in italics indicate fastest lap)

Year	Team	Car	1	2	3	4	5	6	7	8	9	10	11	12	13	14	15	16	17	18	19	20	21	22	23	24	25	26	27	28	29	30	31	32	33	34	DC	Points
1981	Launceston Hotel	Holden Commodore (VC)	SYM	CAL	CAL	LAK	SAN	SAN	WAN	AIR; 4	AIR; 4	SUR; 13	LAK																								26th	1
1985	Holden Dealer Team	Holden Commodore (VK)	WIN	SAN	SYM	WAN	AIR	CAL	SUR; 6	LAK; Ret	AMA	ORA																									25th	13
1987	Enzed Team Perkins	Holden Commodore (VK)	CAL; 2	SYM; 7	LAK; 4	WAN; 3	AIR; 6	SUR; 5	SAN; 3	AMA; 5	ORA; 4																										5th	117
1988	Holden Special Vehicles	Holden Commodore (VL)	CAL; 4	SYM; Ret	WIN; Ret	WAN; 6	AIR; 8	LAK; 4	SAN; 3	AMA; 7	ORA; Ret																										7th	45
1989	Perkins Engineering	Holden Commodore (VL)	AMA	SYM	LAK	WAN	MAL	SAN; 8	WIN; Ret	ORA																											18th	3
1990	Perkins Engineering	Holden Commodore (VL)	AMA; 11	SYM; 10	PHI; 8	WIN; 7	LAK; 14	MAL; 7	WAN; 7	ORA; Ret																											11th	16
1991	Mobil 1 Racing	Holden Commodore (VN)	SAN; 14	SYM; 8	WAN; 7	LAK; 8	WIN; 10	AMA; 9	MAL; 11	LAK; 12	ORA; 6																										11th	19
1992	Perkins Engineering	Holden Commodore (VL)	AMA; R1	AMA; R2	SAN; R3; 7	SAN; R4; 8	SYM; R5	SYM; R6	WIN; R7; 4	WIN; R8; 6	LAK; R9; 7	LAK; R10; 9	EAS; R11; 13	EAS; R12; 12	MAL; R13; 4	MAL; R14; 8	BAR; R15; 9	BAR; R16; 5	ORA; R17; 8	ORA; R18; 8																	10th	108
1993	Perkins Engineering	Holden Commodore (VL)	AMA; R1; 10	AMA; R2; Ret	SYM; R3; 6	SYM; R4; 12	PHI; R5; 5	PHI; R6; Ret	LAK; R7; Ret	LAK; R8; 9	WIN; R9; 5	WIN; R10; 10	EAS; R11; 6	EAS; R12; 6	MAL; R13; 6	MAL; R14; 7	BAR; R15; Ret	BAR; R16; 4	ORA; R17; 10	ORA; R18; 10																	12th	38
1994	Perkins Engineering	Holden Commodore (VP)	AMA; R1; 7	AMA; R2; 15	SAN; R3; 7	SAN; R4; 2	SYM; R5; 5	SYM; R6; 9	PHI; R7; 11	PHI; R8; Ret	LAK; R9; 2	LAK; R10; 1	WIN; R11; 6	WIN; R12; 5	EAS; R13; 3	EAS; R14; 11	MAL; R15; 7	MAL; R16; 2	BAR; R17; 2	BAR; R18; 2	ORA; R19; 5	ORA; R20; 10															4th	177
1995	Perkins Engineering	Holden Commodore (VR)	SAN; R1; 1	**SAN**; **R2**; **2**	SYM; R3; Ret	SYM; R4; 5	BAT; R5; 5	BAT; R6; 3	PHI; R7; Ret	PHI; R8; 7	LAK; R9; 6	LAK; R10; 4	WIN; R11; Ret	WIN; R12; 6	EAS; R13; Ret	EAS; R14; 8	MAL; R15; 12	MAL; R16; 14	BAR; R17; 3	BAR; R18; 2	ORA; R19; 8	ORA; R20; 5															4th	178
1996	Perkins Engineering	Holden Commodore (VR)	EAS; R1; 10	EAS; R2; 8	EAS; R3; 9	SAN; R4; 9	SAN; R5; 5	SAN; R6; Ret	BAT; R7; 8	BAT; R8; 3	BAT; R9; 3	SYM; R10; 15	SYM; R11; 6	SYM; R12; 6	PHI; R13; 2	PHI; R14; 1	**PHI**; **R15**; **8**	CAL; R16; 5	CAL; R17; 7	CAL; R18; 3	LAK; R19; 7	LAK; R20; 6	LAK; R21; 12	BAR; R22; 10	BAR; R23; 8	BAR; R24; Ret	MAL; R25; 4	MAL; R26; 5	MAL; R27; Ret	ORA; R28; 12	ORA; R29; 7	ORA; R30; 6					5th	192
1997	Perkins Engineering	Holden Commodore (VS)	CAL; R1; 7	CAL; R2; 13	CAL; R3; 6	PHI; R4; 4	PHI; R5; 2	PHI; R6; 1	SAN; R7; 4	SAN; R8; DSQ	SAN; R9; Ret	SYM; R10; 6	SYM; R11; 7	SYM; R12; 7	WIN; R13; 1	**WIN**; **R14**; **2**	WIN; R15; 2	EAS; R16; 6	EAS; R17; 3	EAS; R18; Ret	LAK; R19; 8	LAK; R20; 5	LAK; R21; 5	BAR; R22; 1	**BAR**; **R23**; **6**	BAR; R24; Ret	MAL; R25; 2	MAL; R26; 2	MAL; R27; 1	ORA; R28; 12	ORA; R29; 8	ORA; R30; 9					5th	548
1998	Perkins Engineering	Holden Commodore (VS)	SAN; R1; 5	SAN; R2; 5	SAN; R3; 5	SYM; R4; 8	SYM; R5; 6	SYM; R6; 6	LAK; R7; 4	LAK; R8; 3	LAK; R9; 3	PHI; R10; 7	PHI; R11; 9	PHI; R12; 4	WIN; R13; 3	WIN; R14; 4	WIN; R15; 17	MAL; R16; 4	MAL; R17; 14	MAL; R18; 11	BAR; R19; 5	BAR; R20; 4	BAR; R21; 4	CAL; R22; 10	CAL; R23; 11	CAL; R24; C	HDV; R25; 16	HDV; R26; 6	HDV; R27; 4	ORA; R28; Ret	ORA; R29; 13	ORA; R30; 8					4th	722
1999	Perkins Engineering	Holden Commodore (VT)	EAS; R1; 6	EAS; R2; 3	EAS; R3; Ret	ADE; R4; 37	ADE; R5; 7	BAR; R6; 7	BAR; R7; 16	BAR; R8; 11	PHI; R9; Wth	PHI; R10; Wth	PHI; R11; Wth	HDV; R12; 11	HDV; R13; 11	HDV; R14; 8	SAN; R15; 14	SAN; R16; 10	SAN; R16; 9	QLD; R18; Ret	QLD; R19; DNS	QLD; R20; Wth	CAL; R21; 14	CAL; R22; 10	CAL; R23; 13	SYM; R24; 14	SYM; R25; 11	SYM; R26; 6	WIN; R27; 27	WIN; R28; Ret	WIN; R29; Ret	ORA; R30; 14	ORA; R31; 10	ORA; R32; 16	QLD; R33; 1	BAT; R34; 7	9th	1232
2000	Perkins Engineering	Holden Commodore (VT)	PHI; R1; 20	PHI; R2; 5	BAR; R3; 13	BAR; R4; 15	BAR; R5; 26	ADE; R6; Ret	ADE; R7; 11	EAS; R8; 11	EAS; R9; Ret	EAS; R10; Ret	HDV; R11; Ret	HDV; R12; 14	HDV; R13; 9	CAN; R14; 16	CAN; R15; 7	CAN; R16; 7	QLD; R17; 9	QLD; R18; 13	QLD; R19; 11	WIN; R20; Ret	WIN; R21; Wth	WIN; R22; Wth	ORA; R23; 16	ORA; R24; 8	ORA; R25; 8	CAL; R26; 11	CAL; R27; 12	CAL; R28; 10	QLD; R29; 4	SAN; R30; 8	SAN; R31; Ret	SAN; R32; Wth	BAT; R33; 11		13th	752
2001	Perkins Engineering	Holden Commodore (VX)	PHI; R1; 20	PHI; R2; 15	ADE; R3; 17	ADE; R4; 8	EAS; R5; 24	EAS; R6; 18	HDV; R7; 12	HDV; R8; 9	HDV; R9; 6	CAN; R10; 13	CAN; R11; Ret	CAN; R12; 12	BAR; R13; Ret	BAR; R14; 22	BAR; R15; 27	CAL; R16; 14	CAL; R17; 12	CAL; R18; Ret	ORA; R19; Ret	ORA; R20; 22	QLD; R21; 2	WIN; R22; 21	WIN; R23; 23	BAT; R24; 8	PUK; R25; 16	PUK; R26; 17	PUK; R27; 7	SAN; R28; 13	SAN; R29; Ret	SAN; R30; 8					14th	1856
2002	Perkins Engineering	Holden Commodore (VX)	ADE; R1; 11	ADE; R2; 14	PHI; R3; 14	PHI; R4; 14	EAS; R5; 23	EAS; R6; 23	EAS; R7; 20	HDV; R8; 21	HDV; R9; 23	HDV; R10; 18	CAN; R11; 6	CAN; R12; 18	CAN; R13; Ret	BAR; R14	BAR; R15	BAR; R16	ORA; R17; 20	ORA; R18; 27	WIN; R19; 14	WIN; R20; 17	QLD; R21; 7	BAT; R22; 5	SUR; R23; 13	SUR; R24; 17	PUK; R25; Ret	PUK; R26; Ret	PUK; R27; 2	SAN; R28; 30	SAN; R29; 14						18th	568
2003	Perkins Engineering	Holden Commodore (VY)	ADE; R1	ADE; R1	PHI; R3	EAS; R4	WIN; R5	BAR; R6	BAR; R7	BAR; R8	HDV; R9	HDV; R10	HDV; R11	QLD; R12	ORA; R13	SAN; R14; 6	BAT; R15; 4	SUR; R16	SUR; R17	PUK; R18	PUK; R19	PUK; R20	EAS; R21	EAS; R22													36th	180

=== Complete World Touring Car Championship results ===
(key) (Races in bold indicate pole position) (Races in italics indicate fastest lap)

Year	Team	Car	1	2	3	4	5	6	7	8	9	10	11	DC	Points
1987	(Australia) Enzed Team Perkins	Holden VK Commodore SS Group A	MNZ	JAR	DIJ	NUR	SPA	BNO	SIL	BAT; Ret				NC	0
1987	(Australia) Enzed Team Perkins	Holden VL Commodore SS Group A									CLD ovr:6 cls:3	WEL ovr:11 cls:7	FJI	NC	0

† Not eligible for series points

=== Complete Asia-Pacific Touring Car Championship results ===
(key) (Races in bold indicate pole position) (Races in italics indicate fastest lap)

Year	Team	Car	1	2	3	4	DC	Points
1988	(Australia) Holden Special Vehicles	Holden VL Commodore SS Group A SV	BAT; Ret	WEL; 2	PUK; 3	FJI	6	27

=== Complete 24 Hours of Le Mans results ===
Year	Team	Co-drivers	Car	Class	Laps	Pos.	Class pos.
1978	(United Kingdom) Charles Ivey Racing	(United Kingdom) Gordon Spice (United States) John Rulon-Miller	Porsche 911 Carrera RSR	IMSA +2.5	278	14th	**2nd**
1984	Team Australia (United Kingdom) John Fitzpatrick Racing	(Australia) Peter Brock	Porsche 956B	C	145	DNF	DNF
1988	(United States) Silk Cut Jaguar (United Kingdom) Tom Walkinshaw Racing	(Republic of Ireland) Derek Daly (United States) Kevin Cogan	Jaguar XJR-9LM	C1	383	4th	4th

=== Complete Bathurst 1000 results ===
Year	Team	Co-drivers	Car	Class	Laps	Pos.	Class pos.
1977	(Australia) NGK Janson	(New Zealand) Peter Janson	Holden LX Torana SS A9X Hatchback	3001cc – 6000cc	162	**3rd**	**3rd**
1979	(Australia) Cadbury Schweppes Racing	(New Zealand) Peter Janson	Holden LX Torana SS A9X Hatchback	A	157	**2nd**	**2nd**
1980	(Australia) Cadbury Schweppes Racing	(New Zealand) Peter Janson	Holden VC Commodore	3001-6000cc	162	**2nd**	**2nd**
1981	(Australia) Cadbury Schweppes Racing	(New Zealand) Peter Janson	Holden VC Commodore	8 Cylinder & Over	67	DNF	DNF
1982	(Australia) Holden Dealer Team	(Australia) Peter Brock	Holden VH Commodore SS	A	163	**1st**	**1st**
1983	(Australia) Holden Dealer Team	(Australia) John Harvey (Australia) Peter Brock (Australia) Phil Brock	Holden VH Commodore SS	A	163	**1st**	**1st**
1983	(Australia) Holden Dealer Team	(Australia) Peter Brock	Holden VH Commodore SS	A	8	DNF	DNF
1984	(Australia) Holden Dealer Team	(Australia) Peter Brock	Holden VK Commodore	Group C	163	**1st**	**1st**
1985	(Australia) Palmer Tube Mills	(Australia) Dick Johnson	Ford Mustang GT	A	159	7th	7th
1985	(Australia) Palmer Tube Mills	(Australia) Dick Johnson	Ford Mustang GT	A	-	DNS	DNS
1986	(Australia) Enzed Team Perkins	(Australia) David Parsons	Holden VK Commodore SS Group A	C	140	25th	18th
1987	(Australia) Enzed Team Perkins	(New Zealand) Denny Hulme	Holden VK Commodore SS Group A	1	2	DNF	DNF
1988	(Australia) Holden Special Vehicles	(New Zealand) Denny Hulme (United Kingdom) Tom Walkinshaw	Holden VL Commodore SS Group A SV	A	137	DNF	DNF
1989	(Australia) Holden Racing Team	(Czech Republic) Tomas Mezera	Holden VL Commodore SS Group A SV	A	158	6th	6th
1990	(Australia) Perkins Engineering	(Czech Republic) Tomas Mezera	Holden VL Commodore SS Group A SV	1	161	**3rd**	**3rd**
1991	(Australia) Mobil 1 Racing	(Czech Republic) Tomas Mezera	Holden VN Commodore SS Group A SV	1	65	DNF	DNF
1992	(Australia) Perkins Engineering	(Australia) Steve Harrington	Holden VL Commodore SS Group A SV	A	135	9th	8th
1993	(Australia) Castrol Perkins Racing	(Australia) Gregg Hansford	Holden VP Commodore	A	161	**1st**	**1st**
1994	(Australia) Castrol Perkins Racing	(Australia) Gregg Hansford	Holden VP Commodore	A	161	**3rd**	**3rd**
1995	(Australia) Castrol Perkins Racing	(Australia) Russell Ingall	Holden VR Commodore	A	161	**1st**	**1st**
1996	(Australia) Castrol Perkins Racing	(Australia) Russell Ingall	Holden VP Commodore		160	6th	6th
1997	(Australia) Castrol Perkins Racing	(Australia) Russell Ingall	Holden VS Commodore	L1	161	**1st**	**1st**
1998	(Australia) Castrol Perkins Racing	(Australia) Russell Ingall	Holden VT Commodore	OC	161	**2nd**	**2nd**
1999	(Australia) Castrol Perkins Racing	(Australia) Russell Ingall	Holden VT Commodore		161	7th	7th
2000	(Australia) Castrol Perkins Racing	(Australia) Russell Ingall	Holden VT Commodore		159	11th	11th
2001	(Australia) Castrol Perkins Racing	(Australia) Russell Ingall	Holden VX Commodore		161	8th	8th
2002	(Australia) Castrol Perkins Racing	(Australia) Paul Dumbrell	Holden VX Commodore		161	5th	5th
2003	(Australia) Castrol Perkins Racing	(New Zealand) Steven Richards	Holden VY Commodore		161	4th	4th

== Larry Perkins Trophy ==
The trophy is for the Supercars driver who accumulates the most points at the Supercars round supporting the Australian Grand Prix.

Year	Pole winner	Team	Car	Races
2018	(Australia) Jamie Whincup	Triple Eight Race Engineering	Holden Commodore ZB	4
2019	(Australia) Chaz Mostert	Tickford Racing	Ford Mustang GT	4
2020-21	No races due to Covid 19 pandemic			
2022	(New Zealand) Shane van Gisbergen	Triple Eight Race Engineering	Holden Commodore ZB	4
2023	(Australia) Brodie Kostecki	Erebus Motorsport	Chevrolet Camaro	4
2024	(Australia) Will Brown	Triple Eight Race Engineering	Chevrolet Camaro	4
2025	(Australia) Will Brown	Triple Eight Race Engineering	Chevrolet Camaro	4
2026	(Australia) Brodie Kostecki	Dick Johnson Racing	Ford Mustang S650	4

== Bibliography ==
- West, Luke (20 August 2021). The Immortals of Australian Motor Racing: The Local Heroes (Part of the 7-volume comprehensive sports collection). Immortals of Australian Sport (7-book series). Gelding Street Press. ISBN 978-1-925946-98-7.

Sporting positions
Preceded by None	European Formula Three Champion; 1975	Succeeded by Riccardo Patrese
Preceded by Dick Johnson; John French	Winner of the Bathurst 1000; 1982, 1983, 1984 (with Peter Brock and John Harvey (1983))	Succeeded by John Goss; Armin Hahne
Preceded by Jim Richards; Mark Skaife	Winner of the Bathurst 1000; 1993 (with Gregg Hansford)	Succeeded by Dick Johnson; John Bowe
Preceded by Dick Johnson; John Bowe	Winner of the Bathurst 1000; 1995 (with Russell Ingall)	Succeeded by Craig Lowndes; Greg Murphy
Preceded by Craig Lowndes; Greg Murphy	Winner of the Bathurst Classic; 1997 (with Russell Ingall)	Succeeded by Jason Bright; Steven Richards
