= Alfa Romeo I =

Fixed keel "supermaxi" yacht

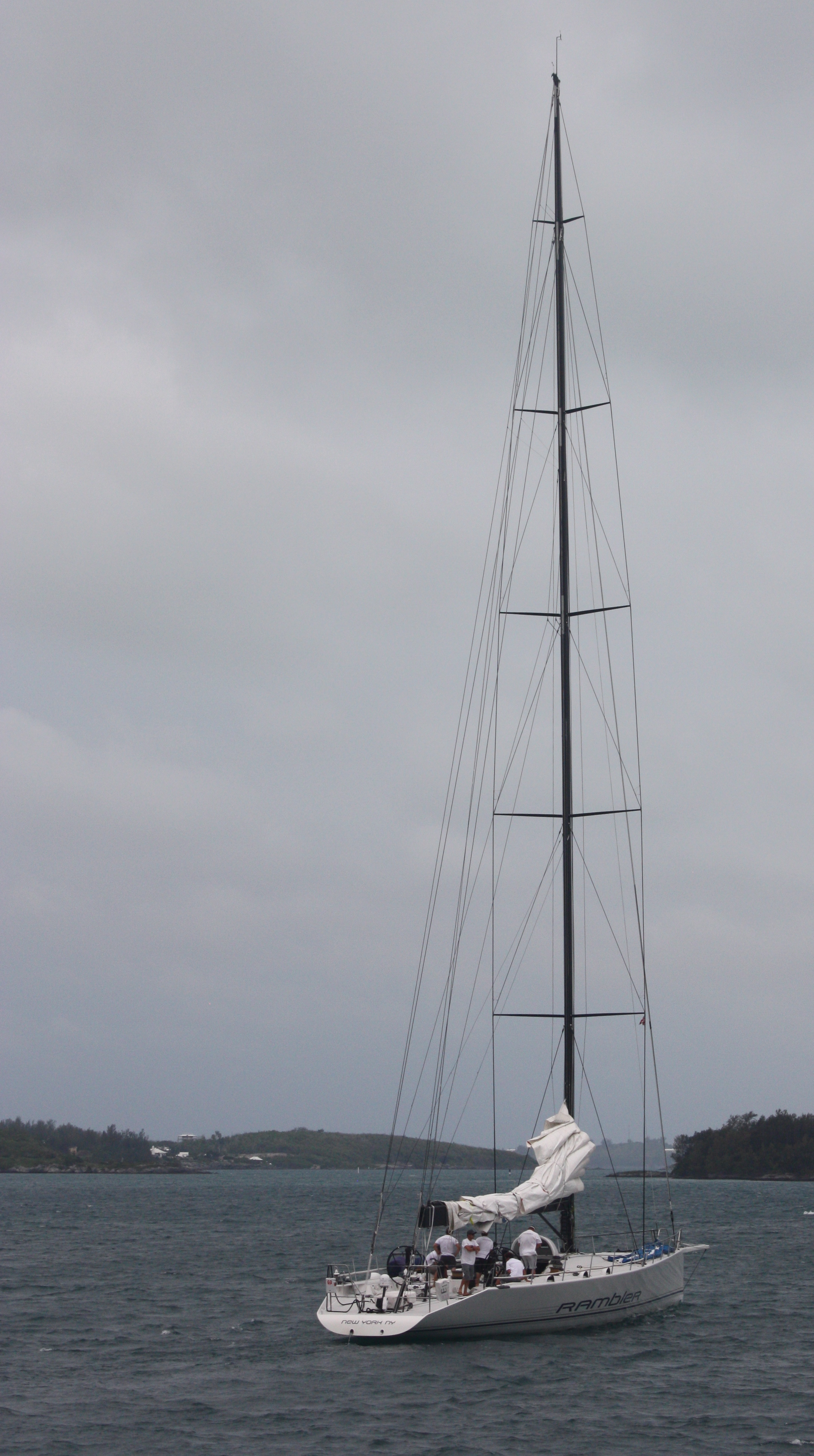
- Other names: Shockwave; Rambler; La Bête
- Yacht club: Royal Ocean Racing Club
- Nation: United Kingdom
- Designer(s): Reichel/Pugh
- Builder: McConaghy; Sydney, Australia
- Launched: July 2002
- Owner(s): Neville Crichton; George David; Philip Rann

Racing career
- Notable victories: 2002 Sydney–Hobart (l.h.)

Specifications
- Type: maxi yacht

Alfa Romeo I (formerly Shockwave, Rambler, currently La Bête) is a 27.43-metre (90.0 ft) fixed keel maxi yacht, launched 2002, which placed first in the 2002 Sydney-Hobart race and the 2003 Giraglia Rolex cup regatta.

She was designed by Reichel/Pugh, and built by McConaghy Boats, Sydney, Australia, using carbon fibre composite construction. Southern Spars of Auckland, New Zealand, built her mast. She has a fixed bulb keel. Launched in July 2002, she won the 2003 Giraglia Rolex Cup regatta, one of Europe's most prestigious regattas. She was first to finish in the 2003 Fastnet race, although she did not win on handicapped time. In 2002, she was first to finish in the Sydney to Hobart Yacht Race. She was first to finish in at least 74 races around the world.

== Sponsorship ==
The Alfa Romeo yachts owned by Neville Crichton were sponsored by Alfa Romeo Automobiles S.p.A. of Turin, Italy. They own the Alfa Romeo name and other intellectual properties such as logos, emblems (used on Alfa Romeo III).

== See also ==
- Alfa Romeo II
- Alfa Romeo III
- Wild Oats XI
