= Neville Crichton =

New Zealand businessman, racing driver and sailor

Neville Crichton CNZM
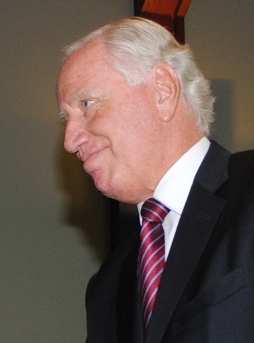
- Crichton in 2012
- Born: Neville Alexander Crichton; 4 June 1945 (age 81); Otago, New Zealand
- Occupation: Entrepreneur
- Spouse: Nadi Hasandedic (m. 2017)

Australian Touring Car Championship
- Years active: 1985–1990
- Teams: JPS Team BMW (1985); Volvo Dealer Team (1986); Dick Johnson Racing (1987–88); Tony Longhurst Racing (1989–90)
- Best finish: 4th in 1985

Neville Alexander Crichton CNZM (born 4 June 1945) is a New Zealand-born Australian businessman who was also a competitor in Australasian motor and yacht racing.

== Early life and background ==
Born on a dairy farm in Otago, New Zealand, Crichton developed a skill for selling bicycles and left Rotorua Boys' High School, aged 14 years, to start selling tractors and hay balers, door-to-door.

== Career ==
=== Automotive industry ===
Crichton entered the automotive industry in his local Ford dealership, where he was promoted to sales manager. A short time later, he became general manager of a General Motors dealership. In 1972, he acquired an ailing used car operation; and in 1977 he acquired the Mazda distributorship for the state of Hawaii. Crichton sold his Hawaiian interests in 1982 and moved back to New Zealand where he acquired a group of Ford dealerships that were in difficulty. Under his stewardship, he turned them into the country's largest Ford dealership.

In the early-1980s, Crichton immigrated to Australia and acquired Ateco that has historically imported Alfa Romeo, Audi, Chery, Citroën, Fiat, Ferrari, Foton, Great Wall, Kia, Lotus, Maserati, SsangYong, Suzuki and Volkswagen motor vehicles into Australia and New Zealand. As of 2023, in Australia, Ateco imports Alpine, LDV, Maserati and Renault motor vehicles as well as remanufacturing RAM Trucks into right hand drive for sale in Australia and New Zealand; and in New Zealand, Ateco distributes BYD battery electric and the Stellantis range of motor vehicles (that includes Abarth, Alfa Romeo, Chrysler, Dodge, Fiat, Jeep, Lancia, Maserati, Mopar, Opel, Peugeot, RAM Trucks, and Vauxhall).

=== Competitive touring car racing ===
In the 1980s, Crichton was a regular competitor in Australian touring car racing. As well as racing full-time in the Australian Touring Car Championship driving a JPS Team BMW 635CSi in 1985 and a Tony Longhurst Racing Ford Sierra RS500 in 1989, Crichton competed at the Bathurst 1000 in 1986 for the Volvo Dealer Team, 1987 and 1988 for Dick Johnson Racing and at the 1987 Spa 24 Hour for the Holden Dealer Team.

==== Australian Touring Car Championship ====
(key) (Races in bold indicate pole position) (Races in italics indicate fastest lap)

Year	Team	Car	1	2	3	4	5	6	7	8	9	10	DC	Points
1985	JPS Team BMW	BMW 635 CSi	WIN; 2	SAN; 5	SYM; 3	WAN; 4	AIR; 4	CAL; 3	SUR; 5	LAK; 6	AMA; 9	ORA; Ret	4th	149
1987	John Andrew Motorsport	Ford Sierra XR4Ti	CAL; 10	SYM	LAK	WAN	AIR	SUR; Ret	SAN	AMA	ORA		31st	1
1989	Benson & Hedges Racing	Ford Sierra RS500	AMA; 12	SYM; 9	LAK; 8	WAN; 8	MAL; 7	SAN; 9	WIN; DNS	ORA; Ret			12th	12.5
1990	Benson & Hedges Racing	Ford Sierra RS500	AMA	SYM	PHI	WIN	LAK	MAL	WAN; 9	ORA			18th	2

==== World Touring Car Championship ====
(key) (Races in bold indicate pole position) (Races in italics indicate fastest lap)

Year	Team	Car	1	2	3	4	5	6	7	8	9	10	11	DC	Points
1987	(Australia) Holden Dealer Team	Holden VL Commodore SS Group A	MNZ	JAR	DIJ	NUR	SPA; Ret	BNO	SIL					NC	0
1987	(Australia) Dick Johnson Racing	Ford Sierra RS500								BAT; Ret	CLD ovr:13 cls:9	WEL; Ret	FJI	NC	0

† Not registered for series & points

==== Bathurst 1000 ====
Year	Team	Co-drivers	Car	Class	Laps	Pos.	Class pos.
1985	(Australia) JPS Team BMW	(Australia) George Fury	BMW 635 CSi	C	68	DNF	DNF
1986	(Australia) Volvo Dealer Team	(New Zealand) Graham McRae (Australia) John Bowe	Volvo 240T	B	156	11th	4th
1987	(Australia) Shell Ultra-Hi Tech Racing Team	(Australia) Charlie O'Brien	Ford Sierra RS500	1	2	DNF	DNF
1988	(Australia) Shell Ultra-Hi Tech Racing	(Australia) John Bowe (United Kingdom) Robb Gravett	Ford Sierra RS500	A	26	DNF	DNF
1989	(Australia) Benson & Hedges Racing	(Australia) Tony Longhurst	Ford Sierra RS500	A	27	DNF	DNF

==== Sandown endurance ====
Year	Team	Co-drivers	Car	Class	Laps	Pos.	Class pos.
1985	(Australia) JPS Team BMW	(Australia) George Fury	BMW 635 CSi	A	129	2nd	2nd
1987	(Australia) Shell Ultra-Hi Tech Racing Team	(Australia) Dick Johnson (Australia) Gregg Hansford (Australia) Charlie O'Brien	Ford Sierra RS500	B	86	DNF	DNF
1989	(Australia) Benson & Hedges Racing	(Australia) Tony Longhurst	Ford Sierra RS500	A	87	DNF	DNF

==== Spa 24 Hours ====
Year	Team	Co-drivers	Car	Class	Laps	Pos.	Class pos.
1986	(United Kingdom) Tom Walkinshaw Racing	(Australia) Ron Dickson (New Zealand) Dave McMillan	Rover Vitesse	Div.3	31	DNF	DNF
1987	(Australia) Holden Dealer Team	(Australia) Peter Brock (Australia) David Parsons	Holden VL Commodore SS Group A	Div.3	206	DNF	DNF

==== Bathurst 12 Hour ====
Year	Team	Co-drivers	Car	Class	Laps	Pos.	Class pos.
1992	BMW Australia	(Australia) Alan Jones (Australia) Tony Longhurst	BMW M5	C	251	2nd	1st
1994	(New Zealand) Neville Crichton	(Australia) Alan Jones (Australia) John Bowe	BMW M3	X	120	DNF	DNF

=== Ocean-race sailing ===
Crichton also had a distinguished sailing career, having owned ocean-racing maxi yachts Alfa Romeo I, Alfa Romeo II and Alfa Romeo III. Crichton skippered the line honours winning yachts in the 2002 and 2009 Sydney to Hobart Yacht Races.

Crichton was also the founder of Alloy Yachts, which he incorporated with the same team that, in 1985, built Chanel, his 28-metre (92 ft) sailing yacht. Over 29 years, Alloy Yachts launched sailing yachts in excess of 67 metres (220 ft) and motor yachts up to 47 metres (154 ft) in length. The company ceased trading in 2016.

== Personal life ==
In 1978, aged 29 years, Crichton was diagnosed with throat cancer. He underwent 30 operations and eventually had his voice-box and oesophagus removed. Doctors told him it was unlikely he would ever speak again, however he was one of the first people in the world to receive an artificial voice box during experimental surgery in Indianapolis. This would lead to his nickname of "Croaky".

Aged 71 years, in 2017 Crichton married his fourth wife, Nadi Hasandedic, aged 38 years. They live in Point Piper.

=== Net worth ===
Crichton appeared in the National Business Review's 2016 list of wealthiest New Zealanders, with an assessed net worth of NZ$130 million. In 2012, it was reported that Crichton's net worth was NZ$175 million. As of May 2025, the Australian Financial Review assessed Crichton's net worth at A$1.14 billion, in the 2025 Rich List.

Year	Financial Review Rich List		Forbes Australia's 50 Richest	
Year	Rank	Net worth ($A)	Rank	Net worth (US$)
2022	163 ▼	$798 million ▲		
2023	137 ▲	$1.06 billion ▲		
2024		$1.40 billion ▲		
2025	145	$1.14 billion ▼		

Legend
Icon	Description
Steady	Has not changed from the previous year
▲	Has increased from the previous year
▼	Has decreased from the previous year

=== Awards and honours ===
In the 2012 Queen's Birthday and Diamond Jubilee Honours, Crichton was appointed a Companion of the New Zealand Order of Merit for his services to yachting and business. In 2015, he was inducted into the New Zealand Business Hall of Fame.
