= List of Sydney to Hobart Yacht Race winners =

This is a list of Winners for the Sydney to Hobart Yacht Race since 1945.

== Line honours winners ==
Year	Sail number	Yacht	State/country	Yacht type	LOA (Metres)	Skipper	Elapsed time d:hh:mm:ss
1945	44	Rani	(United Kingdom)	Barber 35 Cutter	10.67	Captain John Illingworth	6:14:22:00
1946	4	Morna	(New South Wales)	Fife 65 Cutter	19.81	Claude Plowman	5:02:53:33
1947	4	Morna	(New South Wales)	Fife 65 Cutter	19.81	Claude Plowman	5:03:03:54
1948	4	Morna	(New South Wales)	Fife 65 Cutter	19.81	Claude Plowman	4:05:01:21
1949	CYC18	Waltzing Matilda	(New South Wales)	Muir 46 Cutter	14.20	Phil Davenport	5:10:33:10
1950	104	Margaret Rintoul	(New South Wales)	Rhodes 44 Yawl	13.41	Austin W. Edwards	5:05:28:35
1951	CYC5	Margaret Rintoul	(New South Wales)	Rhodes 44 Yawl	13.41	Austin W. Edwards	4:02:29:01
1952	CYC3	Nocturne	(New South Wales)	Payne 35 Cutter	10.67	J. Robert Bull	6:02:34:47
1953	54	Solvig	(New South Wales)	Halvorsen 36 Cutter	10.97	Trygve & Magnus Halvorsen	5:07:12:50
1954	4	Kurrewa IV	(Victoria (state))	Fife 65 Cutter	19.81	Frank & John Livingston	5:06:09:47
1955	66	Even	(New South Wales)	Giles 57 Cutter	17.37	Frederick J. Palmer	4:18:13:14
1956	4	Kurrewa IV	(Victoria (state))	Fife 65 Cutter	19.81	Frank & John Livingston	4:04:31:44
1957	4	Kurrewa IV	(Victoria (state))	Fife 65 Cutter	19.81	Frank & John Livingston	3:18:30:39
1958	CYC15	Solo	(New South Wales)	Payne 57 Cutter	17.37	Vic Meyer	5:02:32:52
1959	CYC15	Solo	(New South Wales)	Payne 57 Cutter	17.37	Vic Meyer	4:13:33:12
1960	4	Kurrewa IV	(Victoria (state))	Fife 65 Cutter	19.81	Frank & John Livingston	4:08:11:15
1961	88	Astor	(New South Wales)	Fife 73 Schooner	22.40	Peter Warner	4:04:42:11
1962	281	Ondine	(United States)	Tripp 57 Yawl	17.53	Samer A. Long	3:03:46:16
1963	88	Astor	(New South Wales)	Fife 73 Schooner	22.40	Peter Warner	4:10:53:00
1964	88	Astor	(New South Wales)	Fife 73 Schooner	22.40	Peter Warner	3:20:05:05
1965	H 700	Stormvogel	(Netherlands)	Vanderstadt 73 Ketch	22.71	Cornelius Bruynzeel; Peter Lindeberg	3:20:30:09
1966	A 45	Fidelis	(New Zealand)	Reimers 61	18.59	Jim V. Davern	4:08:39:43
1967	4279	Pen Duick III	(France)	Tabarly 59 Schooner	18.01	Éric Tabarly	4:04:10:31
1968	281	Ondine II	(United States)	Tripp 73 Ketch	22.25	Samer A. Long	4:30:20:02
1969	3000	Crusade	(United Kingdom)	Gurney 62 Sloop	18.90	Sir Max Aitken	3:15:07:40
1970	1000	Buccaneer	(New Zealand)	Spencer 75 Sloop	22.25	Tom Clark	3:14:06:12
1971	7742	Kialoa II	(United States)	Sparkman & Stephens 73 Yawl	22.25	Jim Kilroy	3:12:46:21
1972	2121	American Eagle	(United States)	Ludens 68 Sloop	20.73	Ted Turner	3:04:42:39
1973	162	Helsal	(New South Wales)	Adams 72 Sloop	21.95	Tony Fisher	3:01:32:09
1974	281	Ondine III	(United States)	Chance 79 Ketch Maxi	24.08	Samer A. Long	3:13:51:56
1975	US 13751	Kialoa III	(United States)	Sparkman & Stephens 79 Ketch Maxi	24.07	Jim Kilroy	2:14:36:56
1976	357	Ballyhoo	(New South Wales)	Miller 72 Maxi	21.95	Jack Rooklyn	3:07:59:26
1977	US 13751	Kialoa III	(United States)	Sparkman & Stephens 79 Sloop Maxi	24.08	Jim Kilroy	3:10:14:09
1978	1400	Apollo	(New South Wales)	Miller 58 Sloop	17.68	Jack Rooklyn	4:02:23:24
1979	1441	Bumblebee 4	(New South Wales)	Frers Maxi	24.13	John Kahlbetzer	3:01:45:52
1980	KZ 4400	New Zealand	(New Zealand)	Farr Whitbread Maxi	20.98	Peter Blake	2:18:45:41
1981	130	Vengeance	(New South Wales)	Tasker Sloop Maxi	23.50	Bernard Lewis	3:22:30:00
1982	KB 78	Condor of Bermuda	(Bermuda)	Sharp-Farr Maxi	24.07	Bob Bell	3:00:59:17
1983	KB 80	Condor	(Bermuda)	Holland Maxi	24.40	Bob Bell	3:00:50:29
1984	KZ 5555	Lion New Zealand	(New Zealand)	Holland Whitbread Maxi	23.90	Peter Blake	3:11:31:21
1985	1400	Apollo	(New South Wales)	Lexcen Maxi	21.60	Warwick Rooklyn	3:04:32:28
1986	KB 80	Condor II	(Bermuda)	Holland Maxi	24.40	Bob Bell	2:23:26:25
1987	130	Sovereign	(New South Wales)	Pedrick Maxi	25.40	Bernard Lewis	2:21:58:08
1988	KA 70	Ragamuffin	(New South Wales)	Frers Maxi	24.13	Syd Fischer	3:15:29:27
1989	KA R2	Drumbeat	(Western Australia)	Pedrick Maxi	25.00	Alan Bond; Peter Gilmore	3:06:21:34
1990	KA 70	Ragamuffin	(New South Wales)	Frers Maxi	24.13	Syd Fischer	2:21:05:33
1991	KA C1	Brindabella	(Australian Capital Territory)	Farr Pocket Maxi	19.62	George Snow	3:01:14:19
1992	KZ1	New Zealand Endeavour	(New Zealand)	Farr Whitbread Maxi	25.73	Grant Dalton	2:19:19:18
1993	9797	Ninety Seven	(New South Wales)	Farr IMS 46	14.30	Andrew Strachan	4:00:54:11
1994	T1	Tasmania	(Tasmania)	Farr Whitbread Maxi	25.73	Robert Clifford	2:16:48:04
1995	US17	Sayonara	(United States)	Farr ILC Maxi	23.80	Larry Ellison	3:00:53:35
1996	GER 4540	Morning Glory	(Germany)	Reichel Pugh 80 Maxi	24.05	Hasso Plattner	2:14:07:10
1997	C1	Brindabella	(Australian Capital Territory)	Jutson 75	22.85	George Snow	2:23:37:12
1998	US17	Sayonara	(United States)	Farr ILC Maxi	23.80	Larry Ellison	2:19:03:32
1999	DEN2001	Nokia	(Denmark)	Farr Volvo Ocean 60	19.44	Stefan Myralf; Michael Spies	1:19:48:02
2000	SWE11111	Nicorette II	(Sweden)	Simonis-Voogd 79 IRM Maxi	24.07	Ludde Ingvall	2:14:02:09
2001	SWE1645	Assa Abloy	(Sweden)	Farr Volvo Ocean 60	19.44	Neal McDonald	2:20:46:43
2002	NZL80	Alfa Romeo I	(New Zealand)	Reichel Pugh 90	27.43	Neville Crichton	2:04:58:52
2003	M10	Skandia	(Victoria (state))	Jones IRC Maxi 98	30.00	Grant Wharington	2:15:14:06
2004	AUS11111	Nicorette III	(New South Wales)	Simonis Voogd Maxi	27.38	Ludde Ingvall	2:16:00:04
2005	10001	Wild Oats XI	(New South Wales)	Reichel Pugh RP100	30.00	Bob Oatley; Mark Richards	1:18:40:10
2006	10001	Wild Oats XI	(New South Wales)	Reichel Pugh RP100	30.00	Mark Richards	2:08:52:33
2007	10001	Wild Oats XI	(New South Wales)	Reichel Pugh RP100	30.00	Mark Richards	1:21:24:32
2008	10001	Wild Oats XI	(New South Wales)	Reichel Pugh RP100	30.00	Mark Richards	1:20:34:14
2009	NZL80	Alfa Romeo II	(New Zealand)	Reichel Pugh RP100	30.48	Neville Crichton	2:09:02:10
2010	10001	Wild Oats XI	(New South Wales)	Reichel Pugh RP100	30.48	Mark Richards	2:07:37:20
2011	SYD 100	Investec Loyal	(New South Wales)	Greg Elliot Maxi	30.48	Anthony Bell	2:06:14:38
2012	10001	Wild Oats XI	(New South Wales)	Reichel Pugh RP100	30.48	Mark Richards	1:18:23:12
2013	10001	Wild Oats XI	(New South Wales)	Reichel Pugh RP100	30.48	Mark Richards	2:06:07:27
2014	10001	Wild Oats XI	(New South Wales)	Reichel Pugh RP100	30.48	Mark Richards	2:02:03:26
2015	12358	Comanche	(United States)	Verdier VPLP 100 Supermaxi	30.48	Ken Read	2:08:58:30
2016	SYD 1000	Perpetual Loyal	(New South Wales)	Juan-K 100 Supermaxi	30.48	Anthony Bell; Tom Slingsby	1:13:31:20
2017	12358	LDV Comanche	(New South Wales)	Verdier VPLP 100 Supermaxi	30.46	Jim Cooney	1:09:15:24
2018	10001	Wild Oats XI	(New South Wales)	Reichel Pugh RP100	30.48	Mark Richards	1:19:07:21
2019	12358	Comanche	(New South Wales)	Verdier VPLP 100 Supermaxi	30.46	Samantha Grant; Jim Cooney	1:18:30:24
2020	Race cancelled due to the COVID-19 pandemic.						
2021	525100	Black Jack	(Monaco)	Reichel Pugh RP100	30.48	Mark Bradford	2:12:37:17
2022	CAY007	Andoo Comanche	(New South Wales)	Verdier VPLP 100 Supermaxi	30.50	John Winning, Jr.	1:11:56:48
2023	SYD 1000	LawConnect	(New South Wales)	Juan-K 100 Supermaxi	30.48	Christian Beck	1/19:03:58
2024	SYD 1000	LawConnect	(New South Wales)	Juan-K 100 Supermaxi	30.48	Christian Beck	1/13:35:13

== Handicap winners ==
Year	Sail number	Yacht	State/country	Yacht type	LOA (Metres)	Skipper	System	Corrected time d:hh:mm:ss
1945	44	Rani	(United Kingdom)	Barber 35 Cutter	10.67	Captain John Illingworth	RORC	4:09:38:00
1946	CYC 3	Christina	(New South Wales)	Halvorsen 33 Cutter	10.06	J. Robert Bull	RORC	4:11:53:27
1947	C 31	Westward	(Tasmania)	Muir 41 Cutter	12.50	George D. Gibson	RORC	4:00:24:56
1948	C 31	Westward	(Tasmania)	Muir 41 Cutter	12.50	George D. Gibson	RORC	3:07:45:48
1949	27	Trade Winds	(New South Wales)	Davey 44 Cutter	13.40	Mervyn Davey	RORC	3:23:39:43
1950	SA2	Nerida	(South Australia)	Mylne 45 Cutter	13.72	Colin Haselgrove	RORC	3:20:17:13
1951	117	Struen Marie	(New South Wales)	Clark 35 Sloop	10.67	Tom Williamson	RORC	2:19:48:26
1952	SA5	Ingrid	(South Australia)	Atkin 38 Ketch	11.58	Jim Taylor	RORC	4:09:56:18
1953	CYC35	Ripple	(New South Wales)	Barber 35 Sloop	10.67	Ron C. Hobson	RORC	3:16:12:12
1954	54	Solvig	(New South Wales)	Halvorsen 36 Cutter	10.97	Trygve & Magnus Halvorsen	RORC	3:17:58:01
1955	CYC1	Moonbi	(New South Wales)	Alden 34 Yawl	10.36	Hal S. Evans	RORC	3:09:21:05
1956	CYC15	Solo	(New South Wales)	Payne 57 Cutter	17.37	Vic Meyer	RORC	3:08:33:52
1957	77	Anitra V	(New South Wales)	Halvorsen 38 Cutter	11.58	Trygve & Magnus Halvorsen	RORC	3:00:55:37
1958	MH46	Siandra	(New South Wales)	Robb 36 Sloop	10.87	Graham Newland	RORC	3:13:46:35
1959	25	Cherana	(New South Wales)	Payne 36 Tasman Seabird	10.97	Russell T. Williams	RORC	3:08:33:02
1960	MH46	Siandra	(New South Wales)	Robb 36 Sloop	10.87	Graham Newland	RORC	3:07:48:04
1961	M2	Rival	(New South Wales)	Buchanan 37 Sloop	11.35	Alby Burgin; Nelson Rundle	RORC	3:03:57:31
1962	CYC15	Solo	(New South Wales)	Payne 57 Yawl	17.37	Vic Meyer	RORC	2:12:45:14
1963	195	Freya	(New South Wales)	Halvorsen 39 Sloop	11.84	Trygve & Magnus Halvorsen	RORC	3:06:03:17
1964	195	Freya	(New South Wales)	Halvorsen 39 Sloop	11.84	Trygve & Magnus Halvorsen	RORC	3:05:58:14
1965	195	Freya	(New South Wales)	Halvorsen 39 Sloop	11.84	Trygve & Magnus Halvorsen	RORC	3:10:03:26
1966	MH 157	Cadence	(New South Wales)	Ward & Swanson 31 Sloop	9.45	Jim Mason	RORC	4:02:46:24
1967	C 96	Rainbow II	(New Zealand)	Sparkman & Stephens S&S 37 Sloop	11.28	Chris Bouzaid	RORC	3:16:39:15
1968	73	Koomooloo	(New South Wales)	Kaufman & Miller 41 Sloop	12.50	Denis O'Neil	RORC	3:13:38:52
1969	2468	Morning Cloud	(United Kingdom)	Sparkman & Stephens S&S 34	10.13	Edward Heath	RORC	3:04:25:57
1970	97	Pacha	(New South Wales)	Camper & Nicholson 54 Sloop	16.46	Sir Robert Crichton-Brown	IOR	3:10:07:39
1971	1347	Pathfinder	(New Zealand)	Sparkman & Stephens S&S 38 One Tonner	11.71	Brian Wilson	IOR	3:03:14:34
1972	2121	American Eagle	(United States)	Ludens 68 Sloop	20.73	Ted Turner	IOR	3:02:15:49
1973	C 177	Ceil III	(Hong Kong)	Miller 40 One Tonner	12.06	Bill Turnbull	IOR	2:17:28:28
1974	294	Love & War	(New South Wales)	Sparkman & Stephens S&S 47	14.48	Peter Kurts	IOR	3:13:25:02
1975	RF20	Rampage	(Western Australia)	Miller 40 One Tonner	12.19	Peter Packer	IOR	2:13:16:56
1976	M 46	Piccolo	(New South Wales)	Farr 36 One Tonner	10.97	John Pickles	IOR	3:07:45:07
1977	US 13751	Kialoa III	(United States)	Sparkman & Stephens 79 Sloop Maxi	24.08	Jim Kilroy	IOR	3:13:58:10
1978	294	Love & War	(New South Wales)	Sparkman & Stephens S&S 47	14.48	Peter Kurts	IOR	3:12:13:00
1979	M 336	Screw Loose	(Tasmania)	Holland 30 Half Tonner	9.14	Bob Cumming	IOR	3:03:31:06
1980	KZ 4400	New Zealand	(New Zealand)	Farr Whitbread Maxi	20.98	Peter Blake	IOR	2:21:13:29
1981	327	Zeus II	(New South Wales)	Joubert 30 Half Tonner	9.20	Jim Dunstan	IOR	3:19:25:59
1982	3444	Scallywag	(New South Wales)	Farr 38	11.50	Ray Johnston	IOR	2:19:19:16
1983	SM 339	Challenge	(Victoria (state))	Sparkman & Stephens S&S 46	14.00	Lou Abrahams	IOR	2:23:07:42
1984	3695	Indian Pacific	(New South Wales)	Farr 40 One Tonner	12.30	Gunter Heuchmer; John Eyles	IOR	3:07:45:03
1985	4117	Sagacious	(New South Wales)	Farr 40 One Tonner	12.20	Gary Appleby	IOR	3:04:34:37
1986	4214	Ex Tension	(New South Wales)	Davidson 36	10.90	Tony Dunn	IOR	3:01:14:30
1987	130	Sovereign	(New South Wales)	Pedrick Maxi	25.40	Bernard Lewis	IOR	3:01:58:41
1988	SM 80	Illusion	(Victoria (state))	Davidson 34	10.20	Gino Knezic	IOR	3:18:20:35
1989	KA SM 2	RFD Ultimate Challenge	(Victoria (state))	Dubois One Tonner	12.17	Lou Abrahams	IOR	3:02:18:45
1990	4000	Sagacious V	(New South Wales)	Farr One Tonner	12.08	Gary Appleby	IOR	2:19:44:32
1991	IR 8000	Atara	(Republic of Ireland)	Farr 43	13.17	John Storey; Harold Cudmore	IOR	2:20:05:11
1991	4527	She's Apples II	(New South Wales)	Jarkan 12.5	12.73	David Strong	IMS	2:21:15:03
1992	70	Ragamuffin	(New South Wales)	Farr 50	15.2	Syd Fischer	IOR	2:21:21:04
1992	9999	Assassin	(New South Wales)	Farr 40 IMS	12.10	Robin Crawford	IMS	2:15:44:57
1993	4343	Solbourne Wild Oats	(New South Wales)	Farr 43	13.10	Bruce Foye; Roger Hickman	IOR	3:20:36:30
1993	MYC 2	Micropay Cuckoo's Nest	(New South Wales)	Lyons IMS 40	12.20	Nigel Holman	IMS	3:18:45:10
1994	GER 4411	Raptor	(Germany)	Murray 41	12.40	Andreas Eichenauer	IMS	2:11:41:00
1995	R 4100	Terra Firma	(Victoria (state))	Murray 41 IMS Racer	12.50	Scott Carlile; Dean Wilson	IMS	3:10:22:36
1996	SM100	Ausmaid	(Victoria (state))	Farr 47	14.24	Giorgio Gjergja	IMS	2:12:35:59
1997	HKG 1997	Beau Geste	(Hong Kong)	Farr 49	15.74	Karl Kwok	IMS	2:17:21:27
1998	8338	AFR Midnight Rambler	(New South Wales)	Hick 35	10.66	Ed Psaltis; Bob Thomas	IMS	2:12:36:23
1999	1836	Yendys	(New South Wales)	Farr 49	15.28	Geoff Ross	IMS	1:20:32:53
2000	YC1000	SAP Ausmaid	(South Australia)	Farr 47	14.47	Kevin Pearce	IMS	2:19:13:38
2001	7441	Bumblebee 5	(New South Wales)	Murray Burns Dowell MBD 62	19.00	John Kahlbetzer; Iain Murray	IMS	2:15:16:24
2002	AUS6606	Quest	(New South Wales)	Nelson Marek 46	14.19	Robert Steel	IMS	2:04:46:46
2003	9407	First National	(New South Wales)	Farr Beneteau 40.7	11.92	Michael Spies; Peter Johnson	IMS	3:14:14:17
2004	GRE55	Aera	(United Kingdom)	Ker 55	16.57	Nicholas Lykiardopulo; Jez Fanstone	IRC	4:02:52:09
2005	10001	Wild Oats XI	(New South Wales)	Reichel Pugh RP100	30.00	Bob Oatley; Mark Richards	IRC	3:03:54:32
2006	294	Love & War	(New South Wales)	Sparkman & Stephens S&S 47	14.21	Simon Kurts; Lindsay May	IRC	3:22:02:37
2007	US60065	Rosebud	(United States)	Farr STP 65	20.00	Roger Sturgeon	IRC	3:09:32:14
2008	52002	Quest	(New South Wales)	Farr TP52	15.84	Bob Steel	IRC	2:17:43:22
2009	YC400	Two True	(South Australia)	Farr Beneteau First 40	12.24	Andrew Saies	IRC	4:07:57:43
2010	YC3300	Secret Men's Business 3.5	(South Australia)	Reichel Pugh 51	15.64	Geoff Boettcher	IRC	4:01:29:40
2011	AUS60000	Loki	(New South Wales)	Reichel Pugh 63	19.20	Stephen Ainsworth	IRC	3:22:34:32
2012	10001	Wild Oats XI	(New South Wales)	Reichel Pugh RP100	30.48	Mark Richards	IRC	3:10:26:00
2013	AUS5299	Victoire	(New South Wales)	Farr Cookson 50	15.20	Darryl Hodgkinson	IRC	3:18:27:43
2014	4343	Wild Rose	(New South Wales)	Farr 43	13.10	Roger Hickman	IRC	3:10:47:43
2015	7771	Balance	(New South Wales)	Farr TP52	15.90	Paul Clitheroe	IRC	4:07:27:13
2016	NZL70000	Giacomo	(New Zealand)	Juan-K Volvo 70	21.50	Jim Delegat	IRC	2:16:13:37
2017	AUS001	Ichi Ban	(New South Wales)	Botin TP52	15.90	Matt Allen	IRC	2:12:13:31
2018	52566	Alive	(Tasmania)	Reichel Pugh 66	22.00	Philip Turner; Duncan Hine	IRC	3:06:41:16
2019	AUS001	Ichi Ban	(New South Wales)	Botin TP52	15.90	Matt Allen	IRC	3:04:11:05
2020	Race cancelled due to the COVID-19 pandemic.							
2021	AUS001	Ichi Ban	(New South Wales)	Botin TP52	15.90	Matt Allen	IRC	4:10:17:39
2022	9535	Celestial	(New South Wales)	Judel Vrolijk TP52	15.90	Sam Haynes	IRC	2:16:35:26
