= Ron Holland =

New Zealand yacht designer

Some yachts of Holland's design

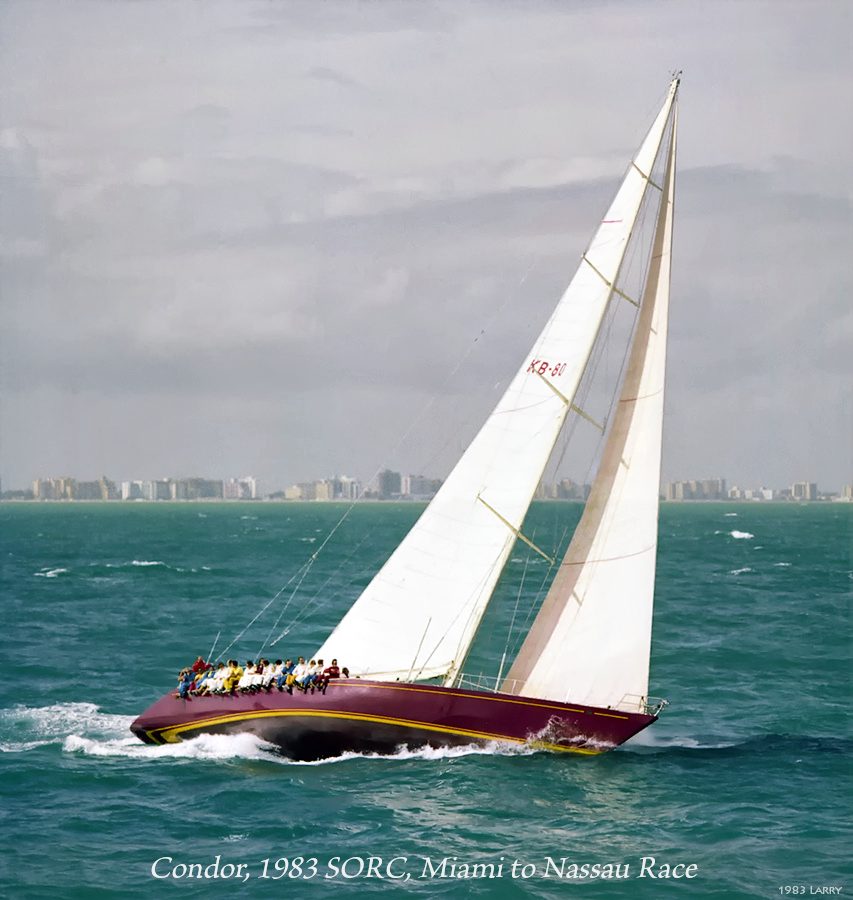
Condor, a maxi yacht which won a number of races

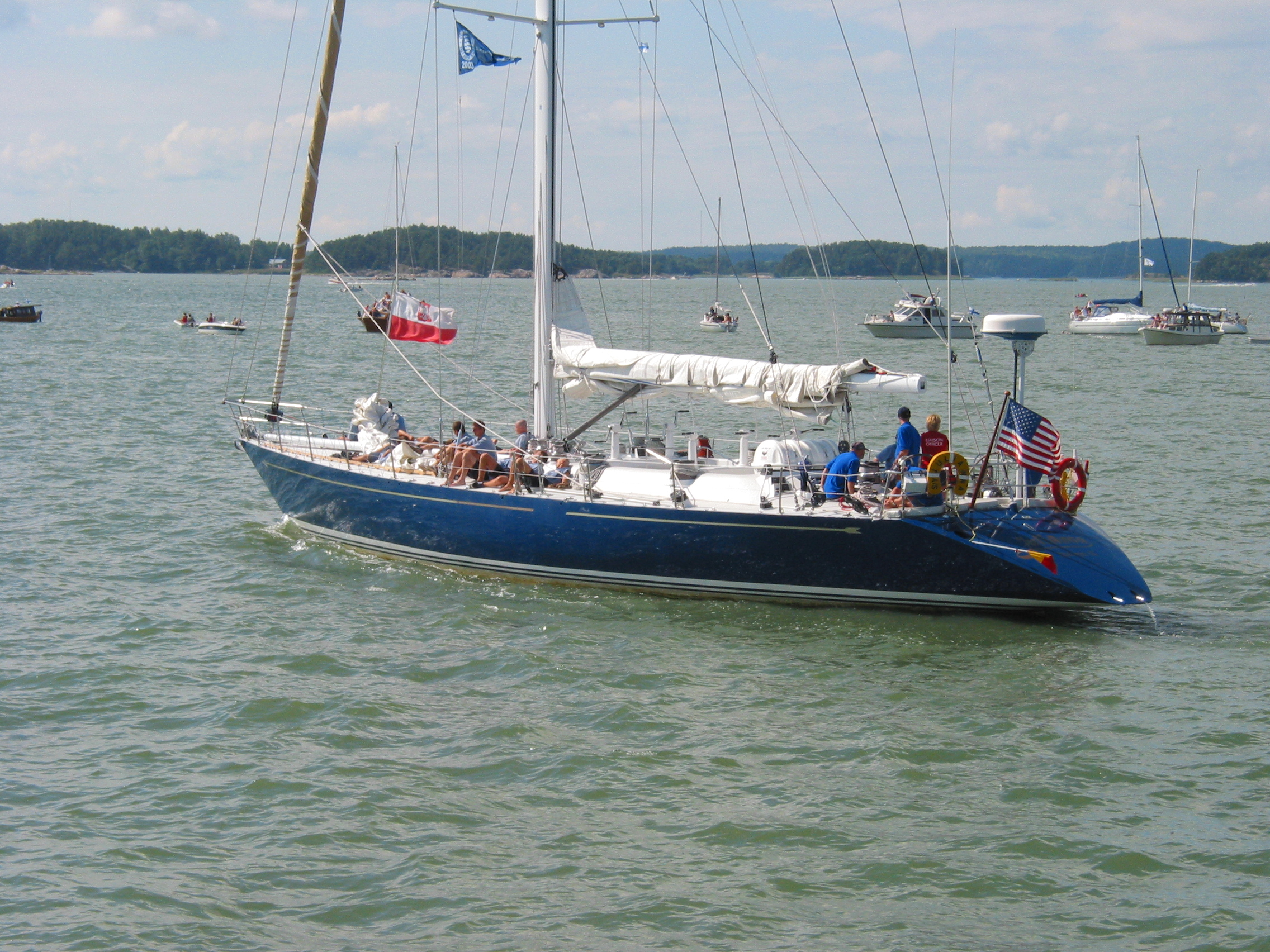
SY Julianna

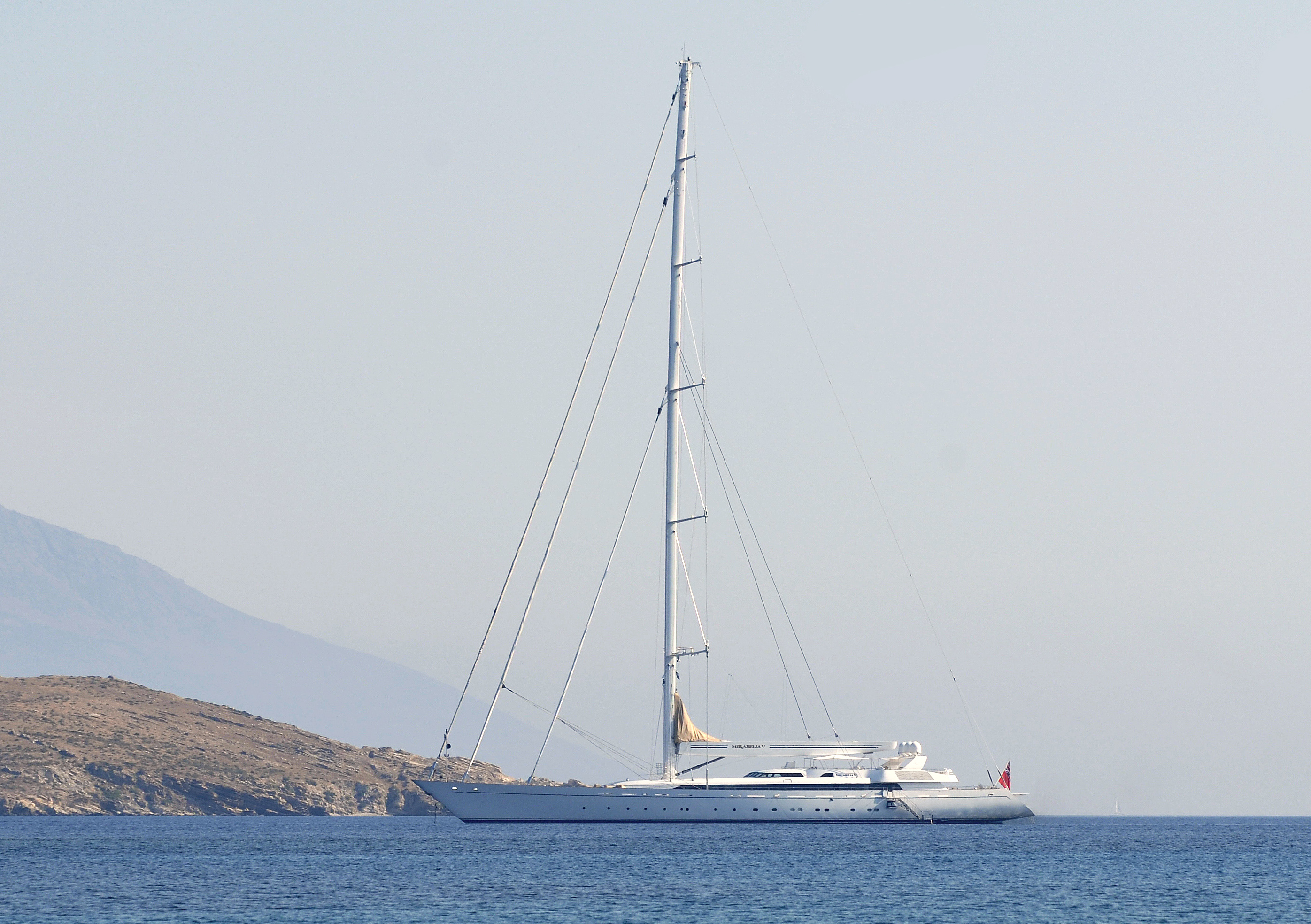
M5 at Rineia, Cyclades in 2008

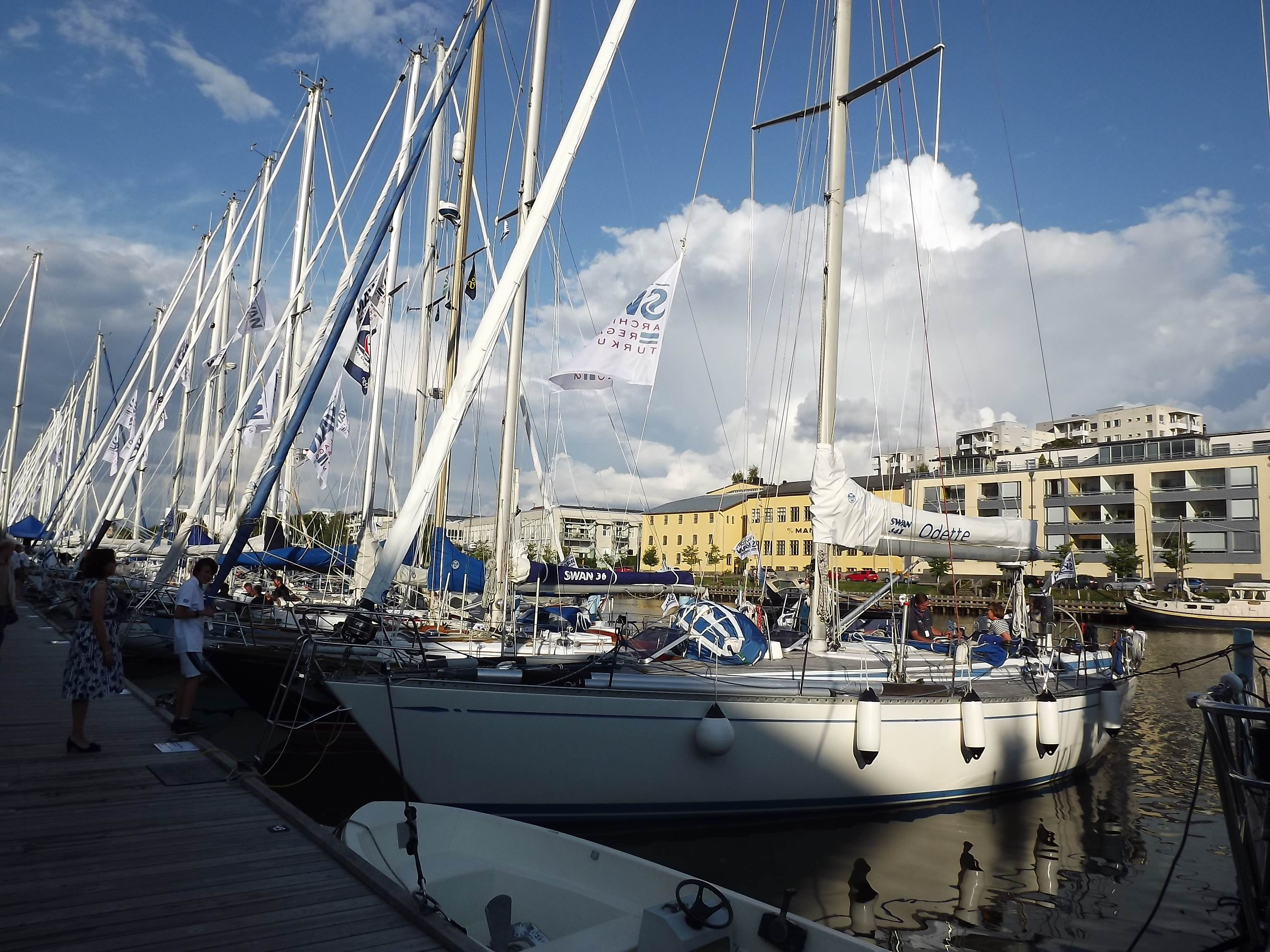
Swan 441 in the harbour at Turku, Finland

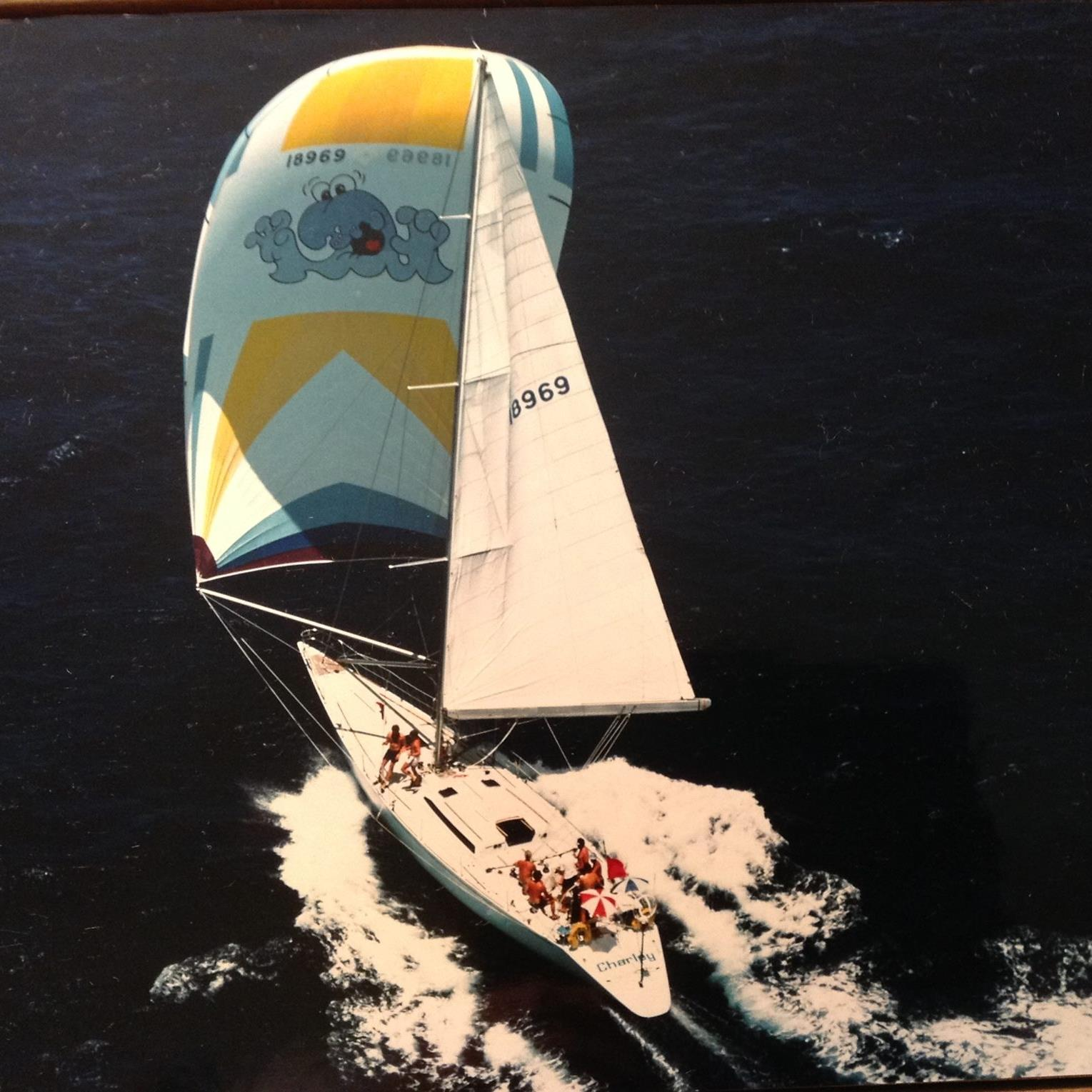
'Charley' is a 67-foot vintage racing sloop and winner of Line Honors at the 1983 Transpacific YachtRace.

Ronald John Holland (born 1947 in Auckland, New Zealand) is a yacht designer, who came to prominence in the 1970s with his successful racing designs, and is now best known for his superyachts such as Mirabella V and Ethereal. He is now based in Vancouver, British Columbia, Canada.

== Background ==
Holland started competitive sailing at the age of eight and was apprenticed as a boatbuilder in Auckland, where he built his first design, the 26' sloop White Rabbit in 1966. He was educated at St Paul's College, Auckland.

== In the USA ==
While working in Florida, he designed the 24' Eygthene, which won the 1973 Quarter Ton Cup. (The name of the boat was a pun on the New Zealand pronunciation of the word 'eighteen': quarter-ton yachts are rated at 18-feet under the IOR rating rule.) The success of Eygthene led to a commission to design a One-ton class yacht for Irish businessman Hugh Coveney. Golden Apple enabled Holland to set up as independent designer, and he relocated to County Cork in Ireland.

== In the Republic of Ireland ==
In 1974 he designed, and Killian Bushe built Golden Shamrock, his 30' design for the Half Ton Cup in la Rochelle. This was followed in 1975 By Golden Leprechaun another variation of the Half-ton Class. The Shamrocks went into production in Cork. One of these boats, Silver Shamrock, built lightly by Killian Bushe at South Coast Boatyard and steered by Harold Cudmore won the 1976 Half-ton Cup in Trieste, Italy.

This was followed by Silver Shamrock III in 1977 which was built in cold moulded spruce for the Half Ton Cup in Sydney, Australia. The boat should have won the Half Ton Cup, but lost her mast in the last race. A later design along the same theme was called the 'Shamrock Silver Jubilee' or 'Nicholson Half Tonner'. Probably the best known of these yachts is SV Grimalkin, which took part in the Fastnet Race of 1979, and became the subject of the book "Left for Dead: The Untold Story of the Tragic 1979 Fastnet Disaster". Although Grimalkin was abandoned at sea, she was later salvaged afloat and still sails.

Meanwhile, Holland's 'Nicholson 33' design, for the English boatbuilder Camper & Nicholson, had begun production and one of these, Golden Delicious, won the 1975 Fastnet Race. This feat was repeated in the 2005 Fastnet when Iromiguy, another Nicholson 33, took the trophy as overall winner. Other boat designs include Big Apple, Regardless, Golden Apple of the Sun and Silver Apple of the Moon. Further commissions followed, including a new Morning Cloud for the former British Prime Minister Edward Heath. Holland's designs featured prominently in the 1977 and 1979 Admiral's Cup series of races in Cowes.

His 40-footer Imp won the 1977 Fastnet Race. This led to commissions for the 80-foot Maxi Class yachts Kialoa and Condor and for a series of designs for Finnish yacht builder Nautor's series of Swan yachts between 1979 and 1990. The Freedom 39 PH, a pilothouse cat-schooner with freestanding masts was also commissioned by Freedom Yachts and began production in 1982. A Holland 30, Screw Loose, won the Sydney to Hobart Yacht Race in 1979.

Condor, the Maxi Class yacht built in 1981, still sails as a passenger boat in Australia's Whitsunday Islands. In 1982, Nolan Bushnell (founder of Atari), commissioned Charley - a 67-foot sloop, designed by Ron Holland using the same design thesis as Kialoa. Charley went on to win Line-Honors in the 1983 Transpacific Yacht Race and other Pacific racing events. In 1983, Peter Blake engaged Holland to design his next Whitbread Around the World Race yacht, Lion New Zealand, a 78-foot maxi, which claimed line honours in the 1984 Sydney to Hobart as well as second on line in the 1985-86 Whitbread.

NCB Ireland was the Irish entry in the Volvo Ocean Race. Although built and launched with great fanfare, she did not perform as well as expected or as well as the more adventurous designs from the southern hemisphere sporting a mizzen rig.

The 103-foot Whirlwind, launched in 1986, was Holland's largest design to that year, and one of the first of a new breed of superyacht - large yachts which used new technologies to provide strong sailing performance without requiring a large crew.

The 247-foot Mirabella V, launched in 2003, was not only Holland's largest design, but also the largest ever single-masted sailing yacht.

In 2018 Ron Holland published his memoir, titled "All The Oceans, Designing by the seat of my pants".

Ron Holland received the Lifetime Achievement Award in Cortina Italy, where Boat International Media held the Design and Innovation Awards in January 2019.

== Designs ==
- 11 Meter
- Aloha 30
- Bombardier 7.6
- Cal 9.2
- Ericson 36
- Ericson 33
- Eygthene - One of Ron Holland's first designs, launched in 1973. This design brought attention to the young designer after winning the 1973 Quarter Ton Cup. The name is a play on the New Zealand (accent) pronunciation of 18. Production boats built in Florida by Kiwi Boats were named Kiwi 24.
- Finn Express 64
- Freedom 39 PH
- Rush 31
- Rush Royale 31
- Salute, subsequently renamed Bayesian

== Bibliography ==
- Elliot, Harold; Kidd, Robin; Pardon, David (1999). Southern Breeze - A History of Yachting in New Zealand (Hardback). Auckland: Penguin Books. ISBN 0-670-88650-5.
