= Cal 9.2 =

Sailboat class

Development
- Designer: Ron Holland
- Location: United States
- Year: 1981
- Builder: Cal Yachts
- Role: Racer
- Name: Cal 9.2

Boat
- Displacement: 7,000 lb (3,175 kg)
- Draft: 4.58 ft (1.40 m)

Hull
- Type: Monohull
- Construction: Fiberglass
- LOA: 29.96 ft (9.13 m)
- LWL: 25.42 ft (7.75 m)
- Beam: 10.33 ft (3.15 m)
- Engine: Universal 11 hp (8 kW) diesel engine

Hull appendages
- Keel: fin keel
- Ballast: 2,730 lb (1,238 kg)
- Rudder: internally-mounted spade-type rudder

Rig
- Rig type: Bermuda rig
- I foretriangle height: 38.00 ft (11.58 m)
- J foretriangle base: 11.88 ft (3.62 m)
- P mainsail luff: 32.50 ft (9.91 m)
- E mainsail foot: 10.00 ft (3.05 m)

Sails
- Sailplan: Masthead sloop
- Mainsail area: 162.50 sq ft (15.097 m^{2})
- Jib/genoa area: 225.72 sq ft (20.970 m^{2})
- Total sail area: 388.22 sq ft (36.067 m^{2})

The Cal 9.2 is an American sailboat that was designed by Ron Holland as an International Offshore Rule Half Ton class racer and first built in 1981.

The Cal 9.2 is a development of the Holland 1/2 Ton racer, which was originally built by Jeanneau, in Europe as the Rush 31. The design was licensed to Cal Yachts by Jeanneau and was also built in Brazil by Mariner Construções Náuticas Ltd as the Mariner 31.

== Production ==
The design was built by Cal Yachts in the United States between 1981 and 1984, but it is now out of production.

== Design ==
The Cal 9.2 is a recreational keelboat, built predominantly of fiberglass, with a painted aluminum mast. It has a masthead sloop rig, a raked stem, a raised reverse transom, an internally mounted spade-type rudder controlled by a tiller and a fixed fin keel. It displaces 7,000 lb (3,175 kg) and carries 2,730 lb (1,238 kg) of ballast.

The boat is fitted with a Universal diesel engine of 11 hp (8 kW). The fuel tank holds 11 U.S. gallons (42 L; 9.2 imp gal) and the fresh water tank has a capacity of 21 U.S. gallons (79 L; 17 imp gal).

The galley is located on the port side at the foot of the companionway steps and includes a two-burner alcohol stove. The head is located just aft of the "V"-berth. Additional sleeping accommodation in the main cabin includes a quarter-berth and two settees, with a drop-leaf table in between them. Ventilation is provided by two translucent hatches, one in the forward cabin and one in the main cabin, plus one ventilator. An anchor locker is in the bow.

The design includes four internal halyards, plus two internal reefing lines and an internal outhaul, plus a topping lift. There is an adjustable backstay, a boom vang and a Cunningham.

== Operational history ==
Reviewer Richard Sherwood, wrote, "After the many Cals designed by William Lapworth, this Cal is one of a new type called 'CalMeter Editions'. The series is intended to be high performance. The hull is a descendent of the Holland Half Tonner. The boat is made with two keels — deep and deeper."

== Variants ==
Cal 9.2
This model was introduced in 1981 and has a draft of 4.58 ft (1.40 m) with the standard keel fitted.
Cal 9.2 R
This model, optimized for racing, was introduced in 1981 and has a draft of 5.58 ft (1.70 m) with a deep lead ballasted keel and a two spreader rig.

== See also ==
- List of sailing boat types
