= Rush Royale 31 =

Sailboat class

Development
- Designer: Ron Holland
- Location: France
- Year: 1979
- Builder: Jeanneau
- Role: Racer
- Name: Rush Royale 31

Boat
- Displacement: 6,394 lb (2,900 kg)
- Draft: 5.60 ft (1.71 m)

Hull
- Type: monohull
- Construction: fiberglass
- LOA: 29.96 ft (9.13 m)
- LWL: 25.42 ft (7.75 m)
- Beam: 10.33 ft (3.15 m)
- Engine: Renault 18 hp (13 kW) diesel engine

Hull appendages
- Keel: fin keel
- Ballast: 2,491 lb (1,130 kg)
- Rudder: spade-type rudder

Rig
- Rig type: Bermuda rig
- I foretriangle height: 34.40 ft (10.49 m)
- J foretriangle base: 11.10 ft (3.38 m)
- P mainsail luff: 37.10 ft (11.31 m)
- E mainsail foot: 12.80 ft (3.90 m)

Sails
- Sailplan: fractional rigged sloop
- Mainsail area: 237.44 sq ft (22.059 m^{2})
- Jib/genoa area: 190.92 sq ft (17.737 m^{2})
- Total sail area: 428.36 sq ft (39.796 m^{2})

The Rush Royale 31 is a French sailboat that was designed by Ron Holland as a racer and first built in 1979.

The design is a development of the Rush 31 and one of many boats based on that same hull.

== Production ==
The design was built by Jeanneau in France from 1979 until 1984, but it is now out of production.

== Design ==
The Rush Royale 31 is a racing keelboat, built predominantly of fiberglass, with wood trim. It has a fractional sloop rig, a raked stem, a reverse transom, an internally mounted spade-type rudder and a fixed fin keel. It displaces 6,394 lb (2,900 kg) and carries 2,491 lb (1,130 kg) of lead ballast.

The boat has a draft of 5.60 ft (1.71 m) with the standard keel.

The boat is fitted with a French Renault diesel engine of 18 hp (13 kW) for docking and maneuvering. The fuel tank holds 7 U.S. gallons (26 L; 5.8 imp gal).

For sailing downwind the design may be equipped with a symmetrical spinnaker.

The design has a hull speed of 6.76 kn (12.52 km/h).

== Operational history ==
Sailboat Lab notes, "the Rush Royale 31 Jeanneau is a light sailboat which is a good performer. It is stable / stiff and has a low righting capability if capsized. It is best suited as a day-boat. The fuel capacity is originally very small."

== See also ==
- List of sailing boat types

Related development

- Rush 31
