= Finn Express 64 =

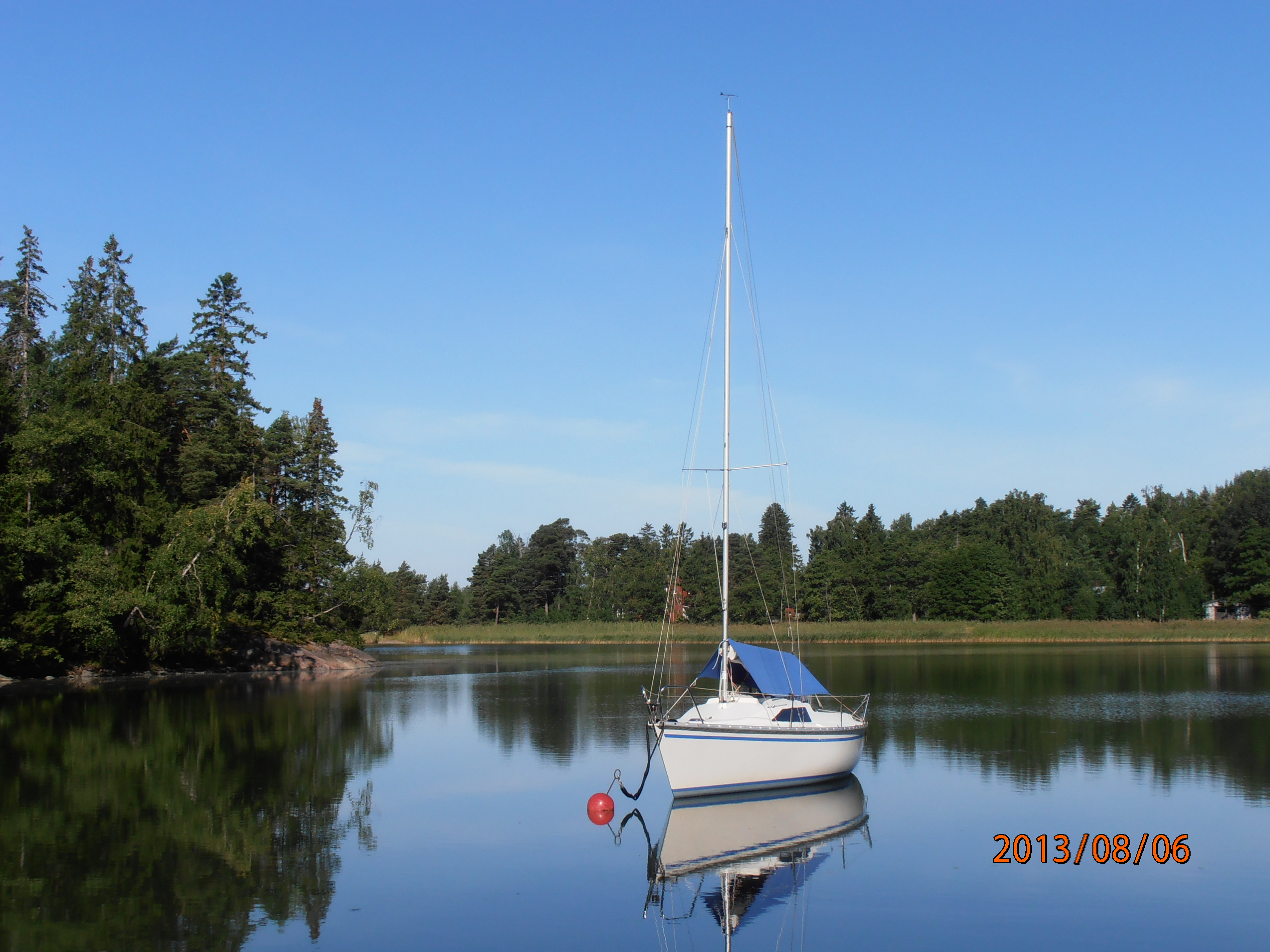

Boat
- Crew: 1-4
- Draft: 1.0 m (3 ft 3 in)

Hull
- Hull weight: 1,000 kg (2,200 lb)
- LOA: 6.4 m (21 ft)
- LWL: 5.8 m (19 ft)
- Beam: 2.5 m (8 ft 2 in)

Sails
- Mainsail area: 11 m^{2} (120 sq ft)
- Jib/genoa area: 9 m^{2} (97 sq ft)

Finn Express 64, also called FE64, is a small sailing boat. It is designed by Ron Holland and is built by Fibå-Vene in Lohja, Finland. The boat was introduced in the beginning of the 1980s.

FE64 is described as being light and easy to sail, with agile handling and flat hull.

== Usage ==
The boat has space for four people to sleep. Under every bed there is storage space. On deck there are two big storage boxes, one at the bow, and one in the stern. There was also an option to get a cooker with two flames and a chemical toilet was also optional.

== Rigging ==
Finn Express 64 has a rigging by Seldén. The mainsail and the jib came as standard with the new FE64, a spinnaker was optional.

== Specifications ==
- LOA: 6,40 m
- LWL: 5,80 m
- Beam: 2,50 m
- Mainsail area: 11 m2
- Jib area: 9 m2
- Spinnaker area: 30 m2
- Draft: 1 m
- Hull weight: 1000 kg

== Reviews ==
The Finnish boat magazine Vene-lehti wrote a review about the boat in 1983. The article can still be ordered on their website. In 1982 the association FE-Purjehtijat ry was established. They have issued a member magazine. In the number 1/1983 there is information about FE64. Additionally there are comments about the boat from the designer Ron Holland. The magazine can still be read on the association's website.

== The Finn Express family ==
FE64 is the smallest of four FE designs. The other designs are called FE74, FE83 and FE94. The number in the each model name tells the size of the boat.
