= Bombardier 7.6 =

Sailboat class

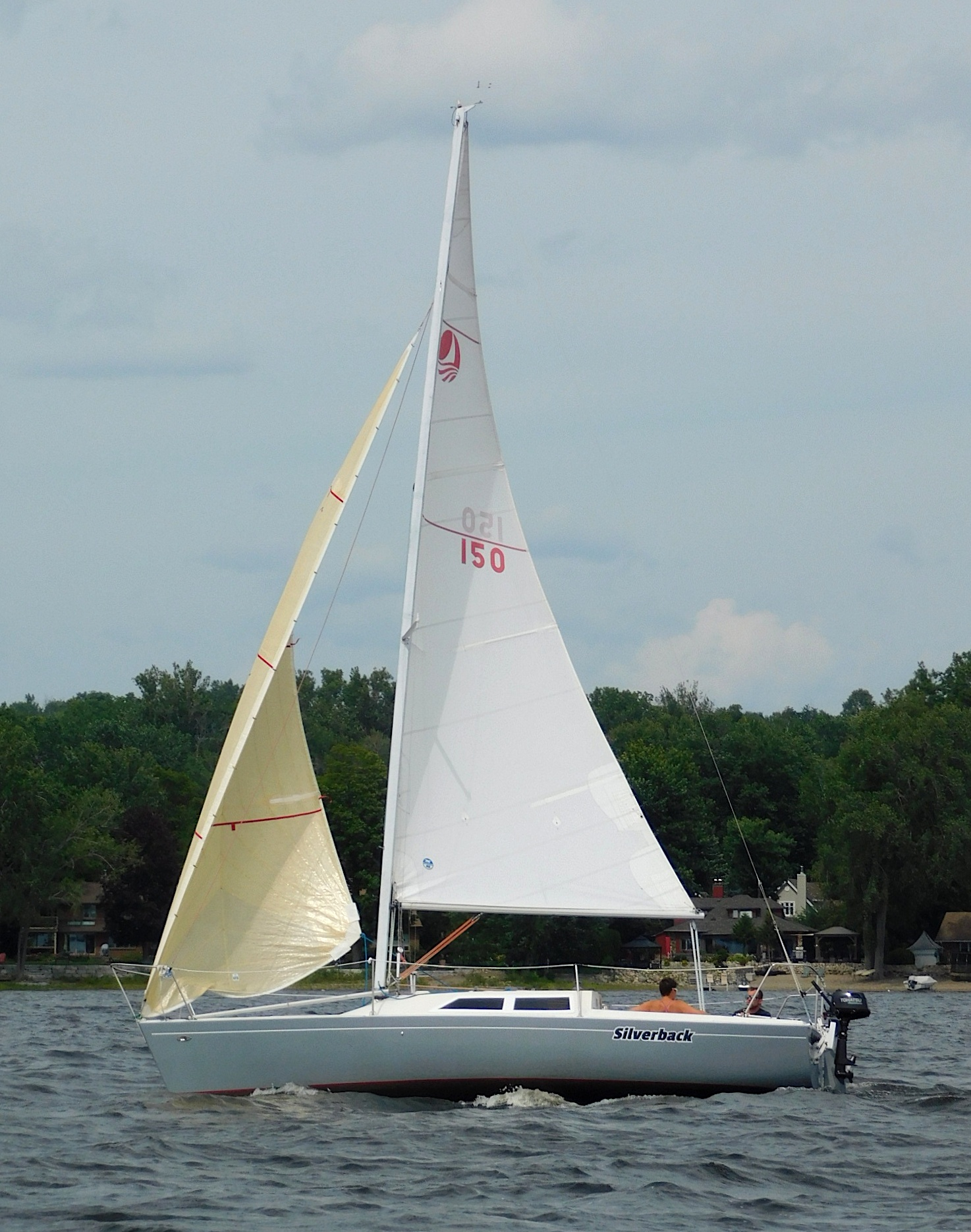

Development
- Designer: Ron Holland
- Location: Canada
- Year: 1980
- No. built: about 163
- Builder: Bombardier Limited
- Role: Racer
- Name: Bombardier 7.6

Boat
- Displacement: 3,300 lb (1,497 kg)
- Draft: 4.50 ft (1.37 m)

Hull
- Type: Monohull
- Construction: Fibreglass
- LOA: 25.33 ft (7.72 m)
- LWL: 22.50 ft (6.86 m)
- Beam: 8.50 ft (2.59 m)
- Engine: Outboard motor

Hull appendages
- Keel: fin keel
- Ballast: 985 lb (447 kg)
- Rudder: transom-mounted rudder

Rig
- Rig type: Bermuda rig
- I foretriangle height: 27.40 ft (8.35 m)
- J foretriangle base: 8.60 ft (2.62 m)
- P mainsail luff: 30.20 ft (9.20 m)
- E mainsail foot: 12.00 ft (3.66 m)

Sails
- Sailplan: Fractional rigged sloop
- Mainsail area: 181.20 sq ft (16.834 m^{2})
- Jib/genoa area: 117.82 sq ft (10.946 m^{2})
- Total sail area: 299.02 sq ft (27.780 m^{2})

Racing
- PHRF: 165 (average)

The Bombardier 7.6 is a Canadian sailboat racer design by Ron Holland, first built in 1980.

== Production ==
The design was built by Bombardier Limited in Canada between 1980 and 1983, with about 163 boats completed, but it is now out of production.

== Design ==
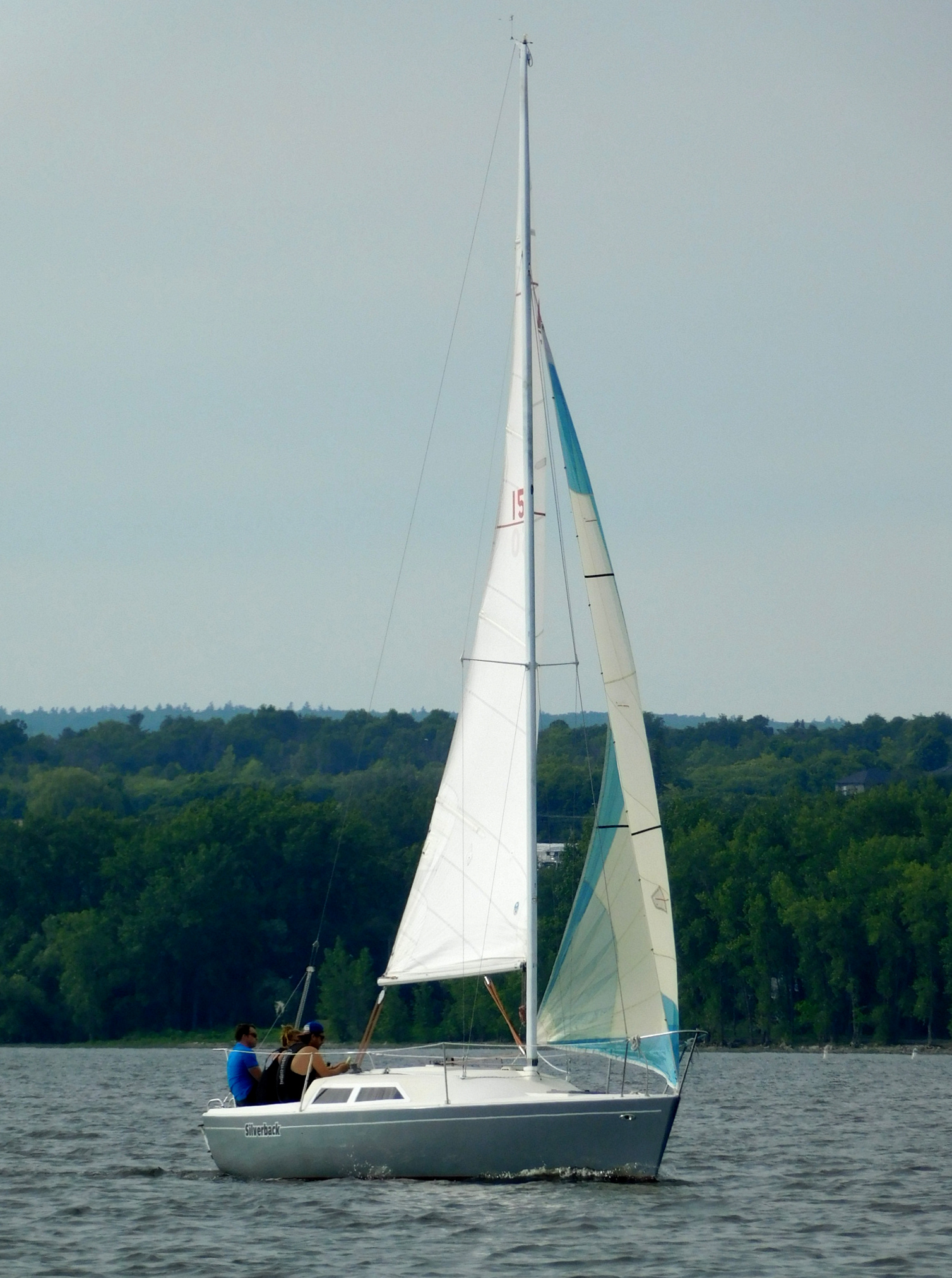
Bombardier 7.6

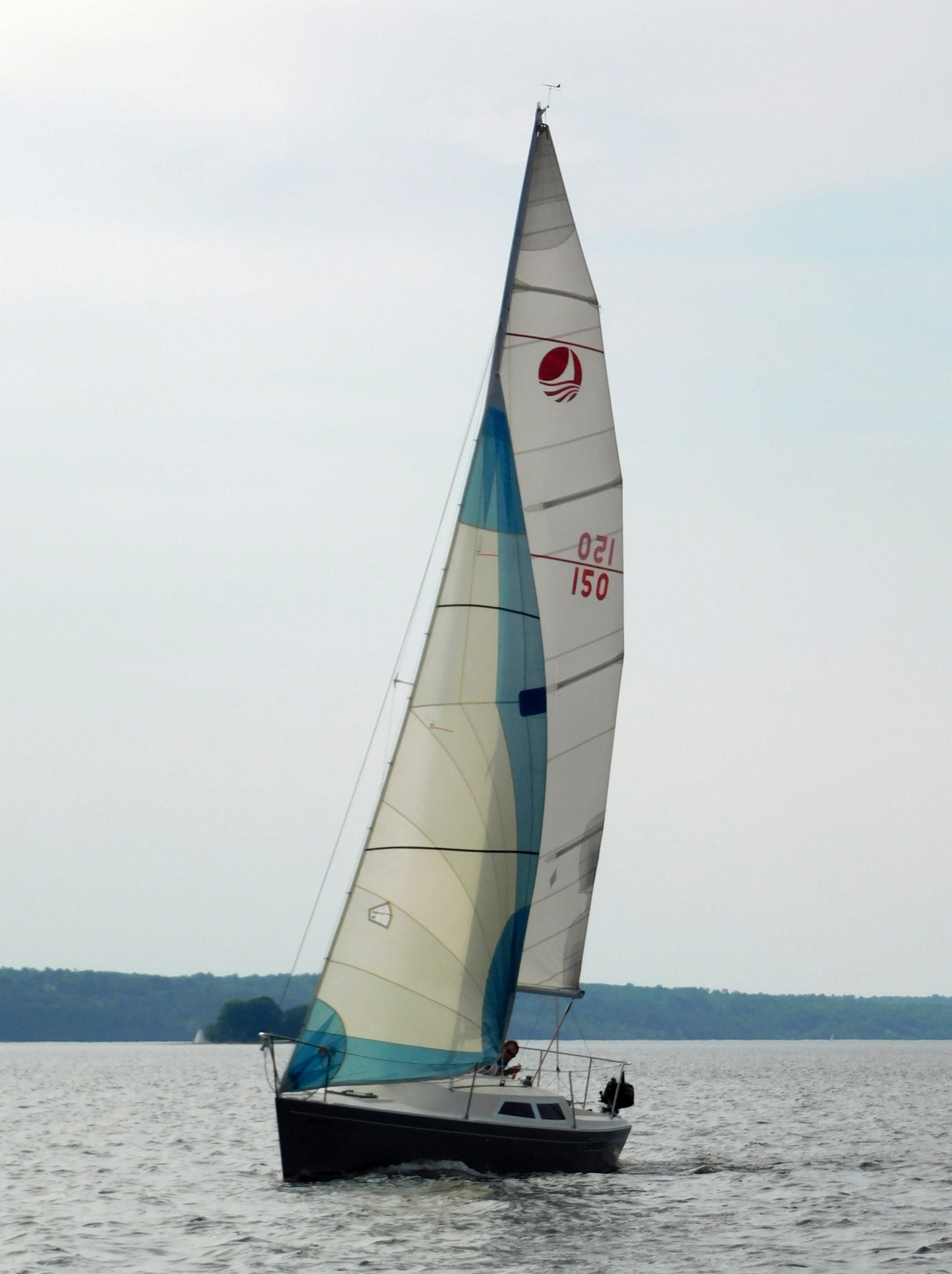
Bombardier 7.6

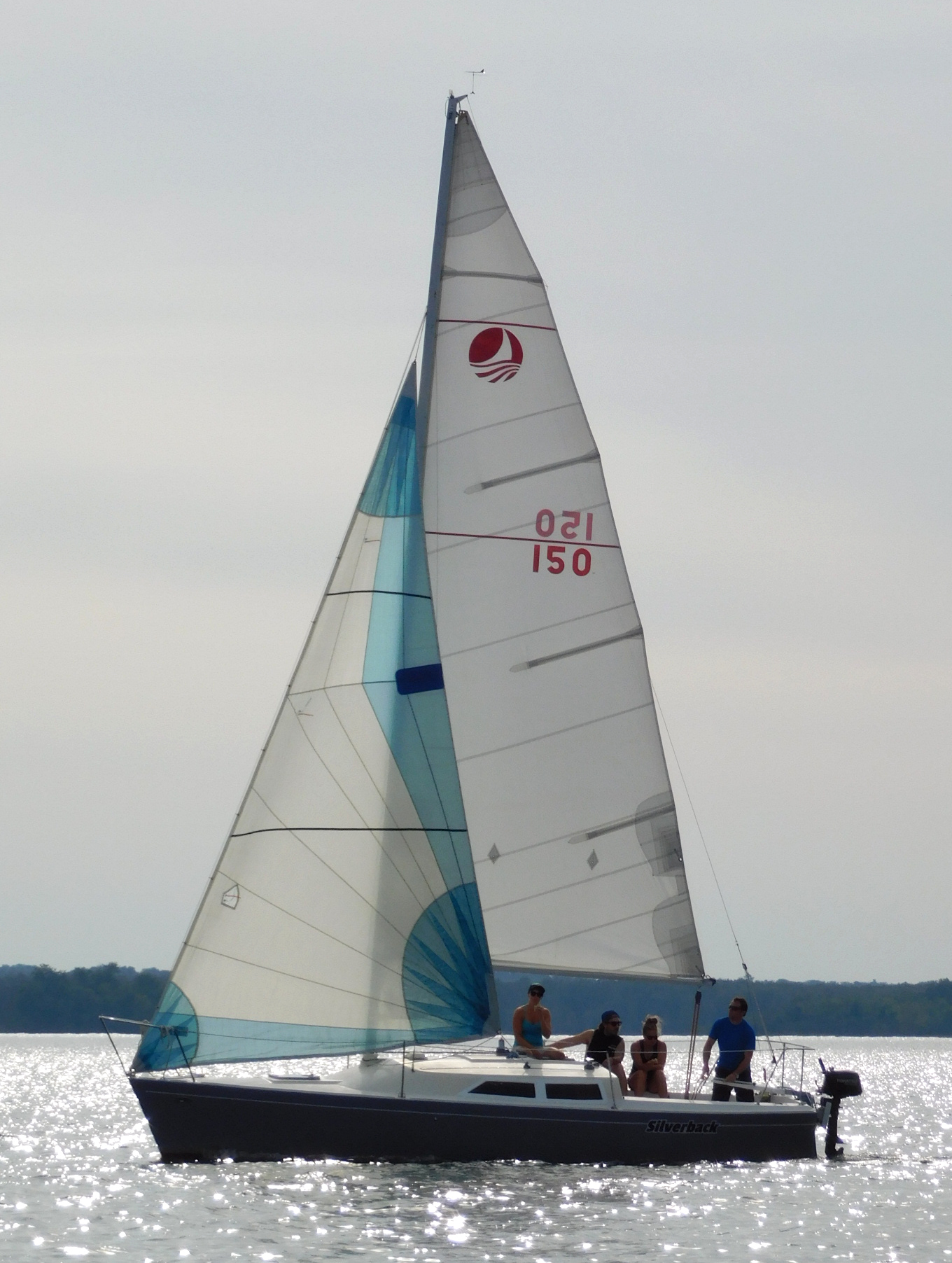
Bombardier 7.6

The Bombardier 7.6 is a recreational keelboat, built predominantly of fibreglass. It has a fractional sloop rig, a raked stem, a slightly reverse transom, a transom-hung rudder controlled by a tiller and a fixed fin keel. It displaces 3,300 lb (1,497 kg) and carries 985 lb (447 kg) of lead ballast.

The boat has a draft of 4.50 ft (1.37 m) with the standard keel fitted. The design is normally fitted with a small outboard motor of 3 to 6 hp (2.2 to 4.5 kW) for docking and maneuvering.

Several different port configurations were used during production, including a single and double side portlight.

The design has sleeping accommodation for five people, with a double "V"-berth in the bow cabin, an dinette table in the main cabin that converts to a double berth and an aft starboard quarter berth. Cabin headroom is 54 in (140 cm).

The design has a PHRF racing average handicap of 165, with a low of 159 and a high of 171.

== Operational history ==
In 2009 a Bombardier 7.6, named Gizmo, sailed by Marc Doedens and his father, Ric Doedens, won the overall Lake Ontario 300 competition.

In a 2010 review Steve Henkel wrote, "best features: She is quick and agile, and with her Ron Holland pedigree, she is apt to make the average around-the-buoys racer happy, while still serving the typical young sailing family as an overnight cruiser. Worst features: Her iron keel and thin hull may need more than the usual amount of maintenance to keep in first-class condition."

== See also ==
- List of sailing boat types

Related development

- Bombardier Invitation
