= Rush 31 =

Sailboat class

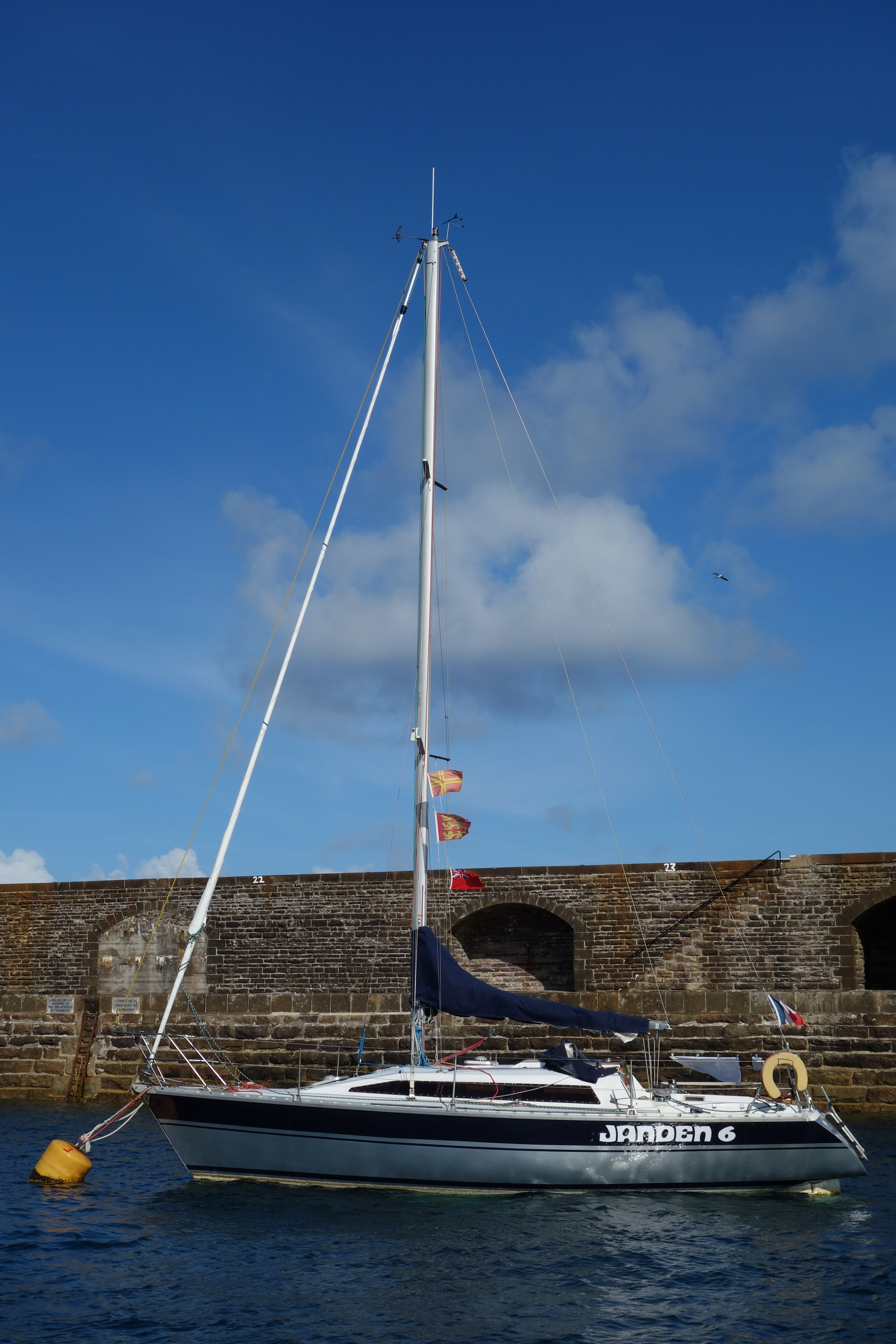

Development
- Designer: Ron Holland
- Location: France United States
- Year: 1979
- No. built: 580
- Builder: Jeanneau
- Role: Racer
- Name: Rush 31

Boat
- Displacement: 6,620 lb (3,003 kg)
- Draft: 4.58 ft (1.40 m)

Hull
- Type: monohull
- Construction: fiberglass
- LOA: 29.96 ft (9.13 m)
- LWL: 25.42 ft (7.75 m)
- Beam: 10.33 ft (3.15 m)
- Engine: Renault Couach diesel engine

Hull appendages
- Keel: fin keel
- Ballast: 2,755 lb (1,250 kg)
- Rudder: internally-mounted spade-type rudder

Rig
- Rig type: Bermuda rig
- I foretriangle height: 38.00 ft (11.58 m)
- J foretriangle base: 11.90 ft (3.63 m)
- P mainsail luff: 32.50 ft (9.91 m)
- E mainsail foot: 10.00 ft (3.05 m)

Sails
- Sailplan: masthead sloop
- Mainsail area: 162.50 sq ft (15.097 m^{2})
- Jib/genoa area: 226.10 sq ft (21.005 m^{2})
- Total sail area: 338.60 sq ft (31.457 m^{2})

Racing
- Class association: Half Ton class

The Rush 31 is a French sailboat that was designed by Ron Holland as an International Offshore Rule Half Ton class racer and first built in 1979.

The Rush 31 design was developed into a whole family of derivative racers, including the GTE, RDF, TDF, Regatta, Royal and the Rush Royale 31. It was also licensed to Cal Yachts in the United States and sold as the Cal 9.2.

== Production ==
The design was built by Jeanneau in France, from 1979 until 1985, with 580 boats completed, but it is now out of production.

== Design ==
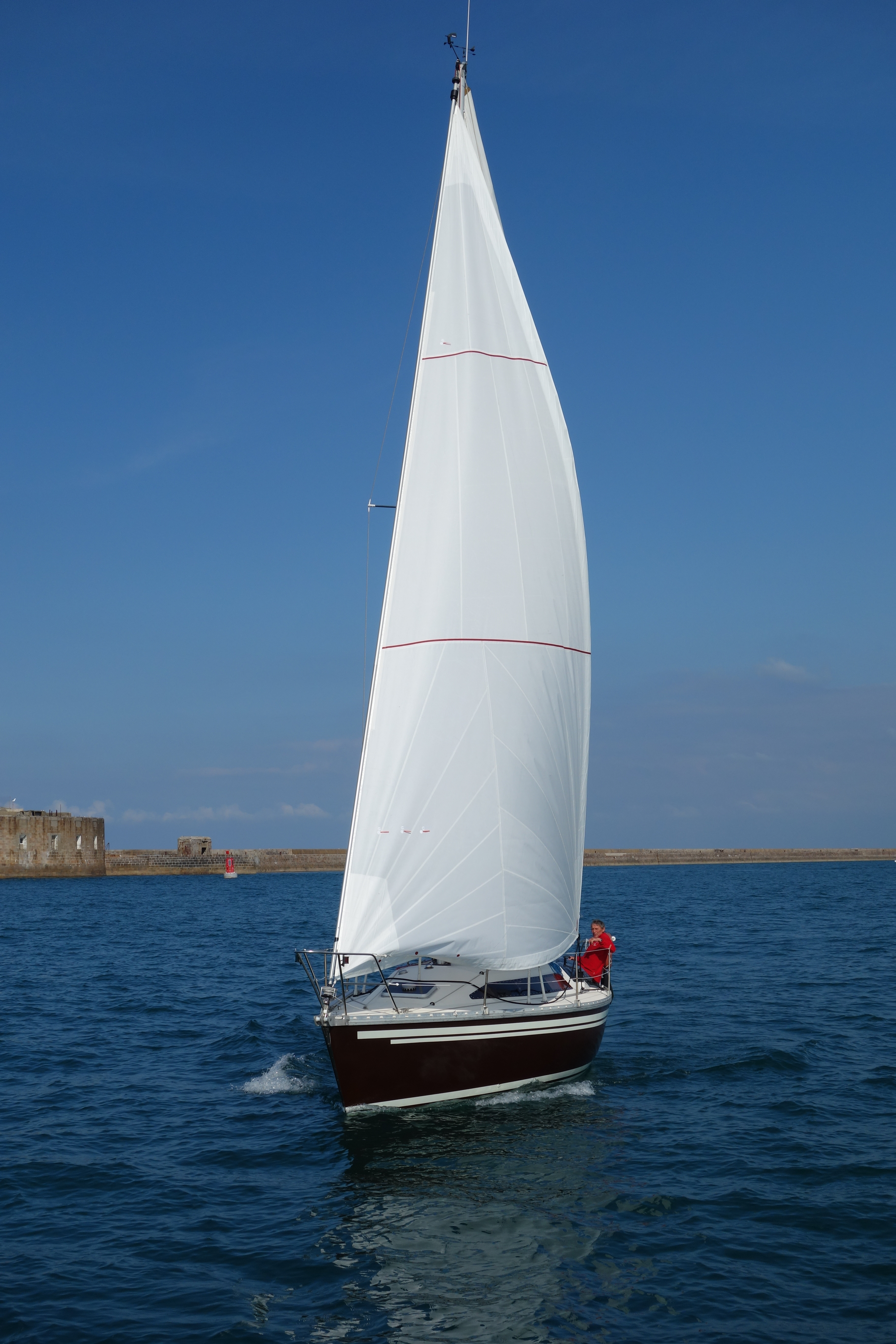
Rush 31

The Rush 31 is a racing keelboat, built predominantly of fiberglass, with wood trim. It has a masthead sloop rig, a raked stem, a reverse transom, an internally mounted spade-type rudder controlled by a tiller and a fixed fin keel. It displaces 6,620 lb (3,003 kg) and carries 2,755 lb (1,250 kg) of iron or lead ballast.

The boat has a draft of 4.58 ft (1.40 m) with the standard keel.

The boat is fitted with a French Renault Couach diesel engine for docking and maneuvering. The fuel tank holds 7 U.S. gallons (26 L; 5.8 imp gal) and the fresh water tank has a capacity of 24 U.S. gallons (91 L; 20 imp gal).

The design has sleeping accommodation for three people, with a single "V"-berth in the bow cabin and two straight settee berths in the main cabin. The galley is located on the port side at the companionway ladder. The galley is L-shaped and is equipped with a two-burner stove, an ice box and a sink. A navigation station is opposite the galley, on the starboard side. The head is located just aft of the bow cabin on both sides.

The design has a hull speed of 6.76 kn (12.52 km/h).

== Operational history ==
The boat is supported by an active class club that organizes racing events, the Half Ton Class.

In its Rush Royal Standard model it was chosen as the one-design boat for the Tour de France à la voile for 1982-1983.

== See also ==
- List of sailing boat types

Related development

- Rush Royale 31
