= Helsal (yacht) =

- Nation: Australia
- Class: Maxi
- Designer(s): Joe Adams
- Launched: April 1973
- Owner(s): Tony Fisher

Racing career
- Skippers: Tony Fisher
- Notable victories: 1973 Sydney-Hobart (l.h.); 1976 Brisbane-Gladstone (l.h.); 1976 Sydney-Mooloolaba (l.h.)

Specifications
- Displacement: 40.4 tonnes

Helsal was the world's first sloop-rigged maxi yacht launched in April 1973. Helsal was commissioned by sailor Tony Fisher, who skippered it to take line honours in the 1973 Sydney to Hobart Yacht Race in a then race record time of 3 days, 1 hour, 32 minutes, and 9 seconds.

Dubbed "The Flying Footpath", it was constructed using ferro-cement with tension cables 45 cm apart throughout the hull.

Fisher first engaged Bob Miller (better known as Ben Lexcen) to design the yacht, however, Miller teamed up with Alan Bond to prepare the yacht Southern Cross which challenged for the 1974 America's Cup. Joe Adams who was working with Miller took over the design work. Fisher also engaged bridge engineer Peter Ellen, who proposed the tension cables in the hull.

Helsal was named after Fisher's wife Helen and daughter Sally. Both Fisher's daughter, Sally Smith, and son, Rob Fisher have skippered boats in the Sydney to Hobart race.

Helsal was sold in 1979 going to the Philippines as a charter boat where shortly after went up on a coral reef, then towed into Manila Harbor, where she was blown onto a breakwater during a cyclone and sank.
