= Jim Kilroy =

John B. "Jim" Kilroy (May 1, 1922 – September 29, 2016) owned and raced the record-breaking Kialoa sailboats from the 1950s to the 1980s, helping pioneer the era of maxi yacht racing.

In 1962 he and his KIALOA I crew won the San Diego-Acapulco race in record time. Within two years, KIALOA II had been designed with even faster speeds in mind.

KIALOA III, a maxi yacht, was the dominant sibling, winning the 1975 Sydney-Hobart race with a record time that stood for 21 years. A 1982 article described her legacy this way: "From her debut in 1975 until her retirement last year, Kialoa (a Hawaiian word for 'long, beautiful canoe') took part in 24 SORC (Southern Ocean Racing Conference) races. Time and again she was first across the line only to have some little 42-foot creep bring the wind from behind and beat her on corrected time. Still, Kialoa won four of her 24 SORC tests on corrected time — a remarkable showing, considering that in the same period only three other biggies out of a total of 19 won so much as one race without benefit of age allowance."

Kilroy followed up with KIALOA IV and KIALOA V.

A 1988 New York Times profile of maxi-yacht owners noted that "Kilroy is remarkable for his dogged participation in all phases of the sport. After the boat is launched, he is skipper, primary helmsman and personnel director. He and his sailing team run their own program for the development of sails, and they wrote the computerized performance guidelines for his boats long before the personal computer was popular."

In his memoir about racing, business and life, Kilroy described being born in Ruby, Alaska, on May 1, 1922, and then growing up in Southern California during the Great Depression. In 1940 he was hired at Douglas Aircraft, where he started off as an inspector and quickly studied manufacturing processes. After serving in the US Army Air Corps Reserve (1944–46) and no longer with Douglas, he began to realize the potential of commercial real estate. Kilroy focused on prime sites across Southern California airports, founding Kilroy Realty Corp, which today is a major Real Estate Investment Trust.

In 2011, he was awarded the Lifetime Achievement Award by Real Estate Forum and GlobeSt.com at their annual conference. In 2014 Kilroy was inducted into the National Sailing Hall of Fame.

Having set up the John B. and Nelly Llanos Kilroy Foundation, Kilroy said proceeds from his memoir would go to benefit youth.
