= Anthony Bell (businessman) =

Australian accountant and sailor

Anthony Bell OAM
- Occupations: Businessman and sailor

Anthony Francis Bell is an Australian businessman and sailor. Bell is the founder of accountancy firm Bell Partners. He is also the founder of the Loyal Foundation, a children's charity.

Bell was the skipper/owner of the 2011 Rolex Sydney Hobart Yacht Race winner Investec Loyal, and the 2016 winner of the race, Perpetual Loyal.

In Australia's 2018 Queen's Birthday Honours, Bell was awarded an Order of Australia Medal for "service to charitable organisations, and to sailing."
