= Kialoa =

Maxi yacht campaign

Kialoa was a maxi yacht campaign founded and led by Jim Kilroy spanning from 1956 to 1989.

Kialoa I was a 50ft yacht remodeled by Kilroy, which won numerous races in California, Mexico and Hawaii.

Kialoa II is a 73ft aluminum sloop designed by Sparkman & Stephens and built in California in 1964. She won races on the Eastern and Western seaboard, the Transpacific Race to Hawaii in 1965, the Transatlantic race to Ireland, the Sydney-Hobart in 1971 and many other races. She was converted to a yawl with a removable mizzen mast in 1968.

Kialoa III was designed by David Pedrick at Sparkman & Stephens as a 79ft ketch and built by Palmer Johnson in 1973, before being converted to a sloop in 1979. She held the Sydney to Hobart race record for 21 years and had many victories worldwide.

Kialoa IV was designed by Ron Holland and launched in 1980.

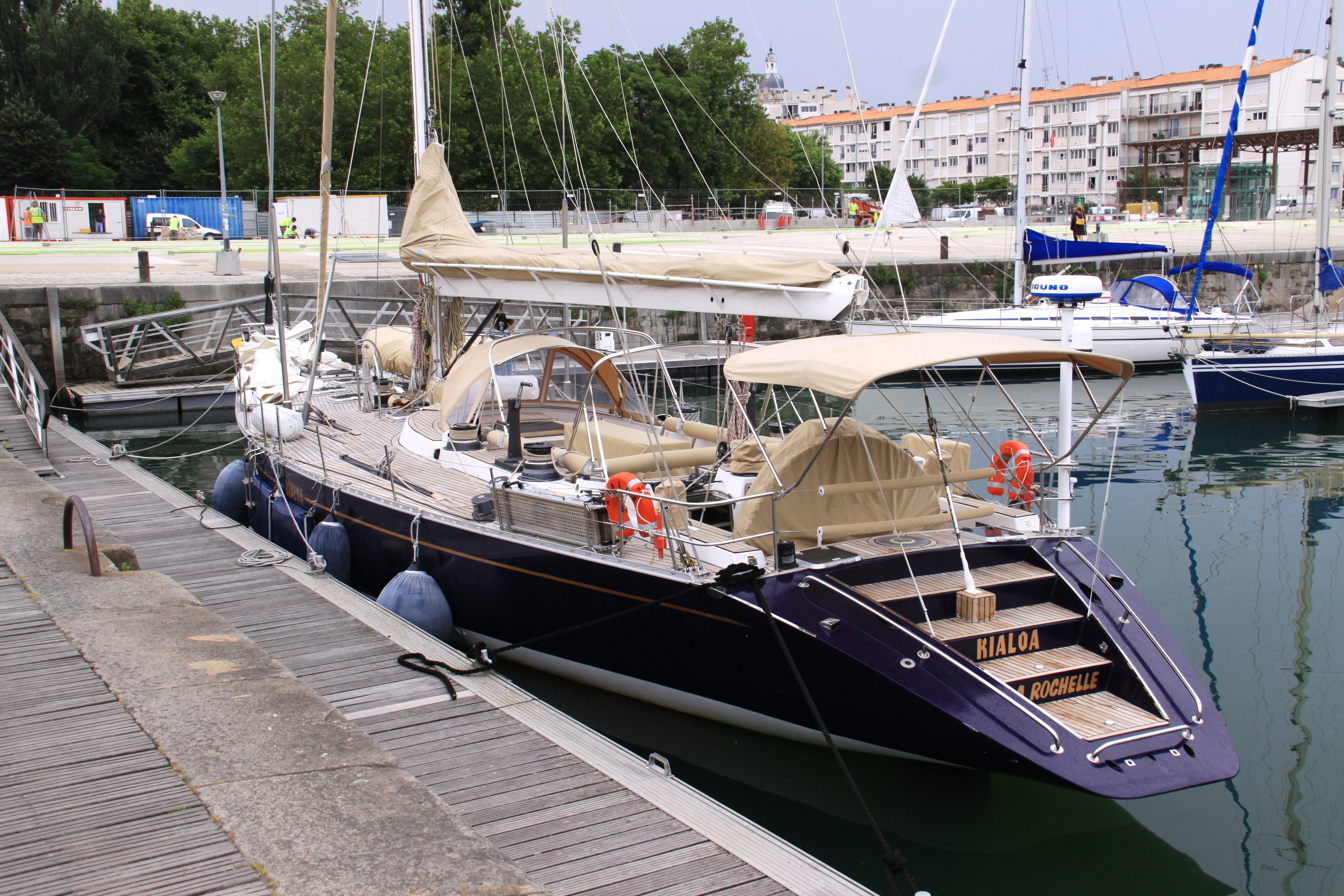
Kialoa IV in 2010.

Kialoa V was a Germán Frers designed maxi; and fierce competitor to Condor, Nirvana, and Sovereign.

Kialoa IV and Kialoa V were World Maxi Yacht champions 5 of the 8 years they raced from 1981-1989.

Race wins include: Onion Patch, Transpacific, Queen's Cup, Tasman Sea, Hawaii, Block Island, Sardinia Cup, S.O.R.C. (Southern Ocean Racing Circuit), Kenwood Cup, San Francisco Big Boat Series and the Maxi World Championship.

In his memoires about racing, life and business, Kilroy describes in detail the evolution of each Kialoa, as well as how he came up with the name after hearing that the Hawaiian word, roughly translated, means "long, white canoe".
