= Tony Fisher (sailor) =

Australian ocean racer (1927–2022)

- Born: 23 March 1927; Sydney, Australia
- Died: 22 November 2022 (aged 95)
- Education: Newington College; University of Sydney
- Occupations: Surgeon yachtsman

Harold Anthony Fisher (23 March 1927 – 22 November 2022) was an Australian ocean racing skipper, yachtsman and surgeon.

== Early years ==
Tony Fisher was educated at Newington College, (1942) and the University of Sydney from where he graduated with a Bachelor of Medicine and Surgery in 1956.

== Yacht racing ==
Fisher won line honours with a race record time, aboard Helsal, in the 1973 Sydney to Hobart Yacht Race. Helsal was designed by Joe Adams. It was named after Fisher's wife Helen and daughter Sally. Fisher has since owned four boats named Helsal with II, III and IV. Both Fisher's daughter, Sally Smith, and son, Rob Fisher, are ocean racing sailers.

== Death ==
Tony Fisher died on 22 November 2022, at the age of 95.
