= Roger Hickman =

Australian yachtsman

- Hickman in 2014
- Born: Roger James Hickman; 1954
- Died: 2 March 2016 (aged 61–62)
- Known for: Yachtsman

Roger James Hickman (1954 – 2 March 2016) was an Australian yachtsman. He was born in Tasmania. He was a CYCA member since 1993, and competed in 39 Sydney to Hobart Yacht Races and won handicap honours in 2014 as owner and skipper of Wild Rose. After finishing a Sydney to Hobart race at the end of 2015, he collapsed and was later discovered to have brain tumours. He died in Sydney at the age of 61 due to cancer. Hickman was posthumously awarded an Order of Australia Medal for service to sailing.
