= Solo (yacht) =

Australian racing yacht

- Nation: Australia
- Designer(s): Alan Payne
- Builder: Vic Meyer
- Launched: 2 January 1955

Racing career
- Notable victories: 1958 Sydney–Hobart (l.h.); 1959 Sydney–Hobart (l.h.)

Specifications
- Length: 17 m (56 ft) (LOA); 15 m (49 ft) (LWL)
- Beam: 4.0 m (13 ft)
- Draft: 2.4 m (8 ft)
- Mast height: 17 m (56 ft)

Solo is an Australian ex-ocean racing yacht, winning over 80 races during her eight-year racing career, all on the east coast of Australia. Solo has circumnavigated the world three times, circumnavigated Australia twice and was charted for two Antarctic expeditions. All of these achievements plus many more have earned her the title "The lady of the sea".

== History ==
Solo was built in 1955 in a Sydney ironworks factory by a Swiss engineer named Vic Meyer from Solothurn, Switzerland. It took two years to build Solo; Meyer and his son, Vic Meyer, Jr. did almost all of the work themselves.

The boat was designed by naval architect Alan Payne, who also designed Australia's first America's Cup challenger Gretel and Gretel II. When Solo was designed she was designed for cruising, but when Meyer tested her on her first sea trial Meyer saw that she was an extremely fast boat, so he decided to do some race sailing with her; from here on Meyer and Solo become recognized around the world for their feats and adventures.

Solo's racing career lasted for eight years (1955 to 1963). During that time Solo had won over 80 different races, never finishing worse than fourth place. Some of the more well-known races she won include winning the Rolex Sydney to Hobart four times, the Brisbane to Gladstone five times as well as a Trans Tasman Auckland to Sydney race. Unfortunately for Meyer, after winning all of those races nobody wanted to race Solo because they knew they didn't stand a chance because of her sleek lines, so Meyer started to lack the competition, he was also getting old in age, he was already 50 by the time he stated racing Solo, so he gave up racing after becoming a life member of the cruising yacht club of Australia and decided to do some cruising.

== Cruising career ==
Meyer started off with an anti-clockwise circumnavigation around Australia with Tim Cormack crewing for the 13 week trip. Leaving Sydney 13 April 1962, it took them 13 weeks to complete. When they made it to Perth they learned that they were to be the first boat to circumnavigate in an anti-clockwise direction after Matthew Flinders in 1802/3. A yacht Warro circumnavigated Australia in a clockwise direction in the 1940's.

After he circumnavigated Australia he decided he wanted to do a bigger adventure and sail around the world. To sail around the world Meyer needed a crew; he was very known for picking all women crew at the time, because he said they worked harder and didn't complain as much. After his first voyage he went on to do it twice more surviving numerous groundings, a cyclone that almost sunk the boat and a demasting in the middle of the Pacific Ocean, again with all female crew. After his circumnavigations he decided that he was going to sell the boat, but before he sold Solo he wanted to make one more trip around Australia.

In Sydney, before departure a lady called Olga stepped on board; she was Meyer's only crew member at the time. Meyer left port around mid-April and sailed around the country. On Monday 14 April, it was overcast and with no offer of a chance to get a sight, that night the radar and echo sounder broke down, through battery failure it is believed, but there seemed no cause for immediate worry. Although a squally south Easter was blowing, everything pointed to Solo being well offshore. Meyer left the autopilot in charge for a while as he attempted to get the radar going again, but while plunging through a squall Solo went through the surf and onto the beach at Fraser Island at a spot about ten miles south of Happy Valley. The tide was well in and when it receded Solo was left high and dry. There she remained for over a month. Unfortunately, she had dug herself into the sand, a plan to bulldoze a channel out to the sea was not practical, and an attempt to tow her off had failed.

On Thursday, 15 May, Solo was refloated by Brisbane salvage expert Joe Engwirda and the help from a high tide, after a two-day operation which had only one anxious moment when she was caught side-on by a large breaker she was floating, once clear of the breakers and into deep water a diver inspected Solo's hull only to find the only apparent damage was done to the rudder. Solo was towed by Mr Engwirda's barge to Mooloolaba 50 km south of her location, she was then towed to a boat yard where she had repairs carried out. During Meyer's stranding he proposed to Olga after she refused to leave him and the boat at Fraser Island. Olga was 25 and Meyer was 70. After Meyer and Olga got married they sold Solo and bought a mango farm on the Sunshine Coast Queensland. One night Vic and Olga were driving home, they were towing a caravan at the time and they had to cross a narrow bridge only suitable for one car at a time, already half-way across the bridge, a truck started to approach from the opposite direction, and to avoid a collision Vic had to steer off the bridge, unfortunately he did that and during that accident Olga drowned. After that accident Meyer sold his mango farm and moved back to Sydney to live the rest of his days. Vic Meyer died in 1993. Meyer had sailed over 300,000 nautical miles during his career.

== Antarctic expedition ==
Solo was sold to the Oceanic research foundation (A.K.A.ORF) the ORF wanted to take the boat to the Antarctic's for a scientific expedition, but they couldn't unless they found themselves a sponsor, after weeks of searching Australian entrepreneur Dick Smith took the job of sponsoring the boat finally after having a complete refit, the boat set sail in late 1977 with famous New Zealand sailor Dr David David Lewis at the helm, during the voyage Solo hit an iceberg which had breached the hull on the port side bow just under the waterline, the crew started to throw things overboard to try to keep the boat afloat, while that was happening the only female on board also the only one to bring a pillowcase stuck the pillowcase over the breach while another crew member smeared concrete over the pillowcase to create a seal, the crew had no other option then to turn around and head home for repairs, when in port the crew said without that patch Solo would have sunk for sure after the repairs were carried out Solo sailed back to the Antarctic to complete her voyage. after the Antarctic expedition the ORF was in need of a bigger boat because Solo could only sleep six at the time.

== Commercial life ==
"Solo" was sold to Jill and Trevor Cook in 1978 who in partnership with Jean and John (Merv) Fuller modified her to meet passenger survey regulations and commenced day sailing charters in the Whitsundays giving their guests the thrill of sailing out to a coral reef on a true racing yacht for snorkelling and lunch before sailing back in the afternoon. During these cruises guests had the opportunity to assist with the sailing and hoisting the spinnaker was a common occurrence. "Solo" was the first racing yacht to operate commercially in Queensland. The Cooks and Fuller Partnership then purchased Gretel in 1981 operating both yachts until selling "Solo" in 1984. "Solo" had a number of different owners after that whilst doing 3 day charters. In the late 1980s her owners at the time had financial difficulties and she was auctioned in Cairns. This auction caught the attention of a Brisbane businessman who thought it would be an excellent idea if such an icon was brought to the bayside suburb of Manly, Queensland, he did just that, he purchased the boat and brought it down to Manly where she was put into commercial survey and now operates charters to local islands in Moreton Bay. "Solo" was sold again in 2005 to a business Lady who with her son operates "Solo" Adventure Sailing

== Specifications ==
- Name: Solo
- Launched: 2 January 1955
- Builder: Vic Meyer
- Designer: Alan Payne
- Construction: Transverse Steel
- Original Club Registration: CYC-15
- Home port: Royal Queensland Yacht Squadron Manly Harbor Village
- LOA: 57'
- Draught: 8'
- Beam 13'
- Engine: 120 hp diesel Perkins 6-cylinder compression ignition start
- Electrical: Garmin GPS/Fish finder, Raymarine Depth sounder/wind indicator
- Rigging: currently Solo is rigged as a Sloop
- Owners: Solo Adventure Sailing

== See also ==
- Brisbane to Gladstone yacht race
- 1962 America's Cup
- Sydney to Hobart Yacht Race
