= Condor (yacht) =

Racing yacht

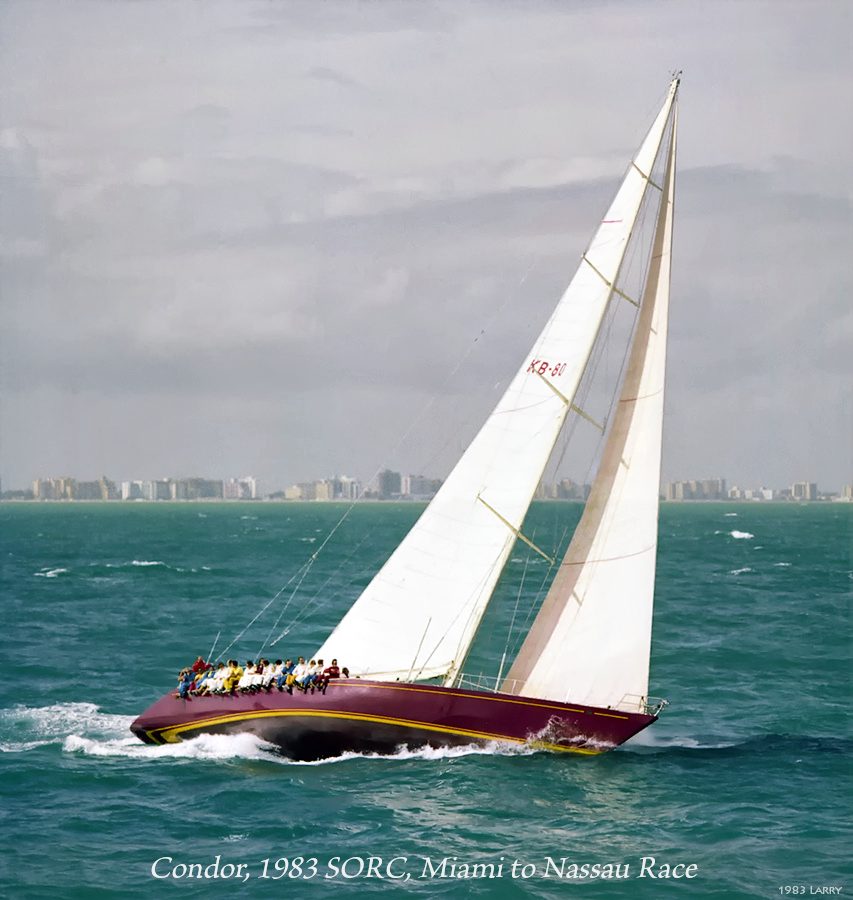
- Condor racing Miami–Nassau in 1983.
- Other names: Condor II; Condor 2 Condor of Currabubula; Condor of Emsworth
- Nation: Bermuda
- Class: Maxi
- Sail no: KB–80
- Designer(s): Ron Holland
- Builder: Killian Bushe at Kiwi Boats, UK, Penryn, England
- Launched: 1981
- Owner(s): Bob Bell

Racing career
- Skippers: Ted Turner
- Notable victories: 1983 Sydney–Hobart (l.h.); 1986 Sydney–Hobart (l.h.); 1981 Fastnet Race (l.h.); 1983 Fastnet Race (l.h.)

Condor is a maxi sailing yacht designed for racing and built in 1981 by Killian Bushe at Kiwi Boats U.K., in Penryn, England. She was registered in Hamilton, Bermuda during her 7-year ocean racing campaign and her sail number is KB-80. She is not to be confused with her predecessor Condor of Bermuda (KB-78) (aka. Heath's Condor-K-707), also owned and campaigned by Bob Bell.

Condor was "probably the most famous Maxi ever, winning every major ocean racing event Twice" according to her present owners, Prosail, the overnight adventure charter outfit in Australia's Whitsundays on the Great Barrier Reef.

== Construction and materials ==
Condor was revolutionary both for having the largest (tallest) single spar mast in the world (at the time of her launch) and for being the largest of all the IOR Maxi fleet at that time. (Ongoing IOR rule changes allowed each new yacht to be slightly bigger than ones built under previous versions of the rating rules).

The boat was constructed using kevlar and composite structures, with an Alloy space frame inside. She was the second yacht of this type to be built where the hull itself could support the enormous loads generated by the huge mast and rig.

Unlike her predecessor, Condor of Bermuda, which was built of wood yet had (the world's first) carbon fibre rig, Condor's mast was aluminium. It was about 18% taller than her 'sistership's' mast due to the additional loading permitted by the space frame. An 8 cylinder 8LXB Gardner diesel engine was installed, turning a 42 inch folding propeller, despite her hull being only 3 feet longer overall.

Both Condor and Condor of Bermuda were eventually installed with Gardner 8LXB reserve engines, due to their reliability, and overall mass, which was a key consideration in IOR ratings at the time. In 1993, the Gardener was replaced with a Perkins 6354 diesel. In 2007 she was fitted with a smaller Yanmar 4LHA which was replaced again in 2017 with the same model. Today she runs a 26" three bladed Hydralign feathering propeller.

Condor was designed by New Zealand boat designer Ron Holland.

== History ==
Condor was a maxi yacht campaigning on the IOR Maxi Circuit from 1981 to approximately 1987.

In 1987, she was sold to Australian Grazier Tony Paola, where she continued to race for a time under the name Condor of Currabubula until she was retired from racing, and now resides in Airlie Beach, on the Great Barrier Reef, chartering for overnight sailing adventures with several of her contemporaries for her present owners, ProSail.

== Current location ==
Airlie Beach, Australia Available for charter by present owners [url=https://prosail.com.au/].
