= Buccaneer (disambiguation) =

A buccaneer is a type of pirate.

(The) Buccaneer(s) may also refer to:

== Aviation ==
- Advanced Aeromarine Buccaneer, a one or two seat, ultra-light amphibious aircraft
- Blackburn Buccaneer, a British-built strike aircraft, in service from 1962 to 1994
- Brewster SB2A Buccaneer, a US close support aircraft
- Lake Buccaneer, a four-seat amphibious aircraft
- Menasco Buccaneer, a 1930s–40s aero engine

== Books ==
- Buccaneers (series), a children's book series written by Sheila K. McCullagh
- The Buccaneers, a novel by Edith Wharton

== Entertainment ==
- Buccaneer (board game), published by Waddingtons
- Buccaneer (role-playing game), a 1979 role-playing game
- Buccaneer (video game), a 1997 video game from Strategic Simulations.
- The Buccaneers (film), a 1924 film
- The Buccaneer (film), a 1938 film directed by Cecil B. DeMille
- The Buccaneers (1956 TV series), a 1956 television series made by ITC Entertainment
- The Buccaneer (film), a 1958 film directed by Anthony Quinn
- Buccaneer (TV series), a BBC television series from 1980
- The Buccaneers, a 1995 BBC television mini-series from 1993, based on the novel of same name by Edith Wharton
- The Buccaneers (2023 TV series), a 2023 British period drama television series

== Sports ==
- Buccaneer (mascot), the 1995 Pittsburgh Pirates baseball mascot
- Buccaneers RFC, a rugby union team based in Athlone, Co. Westmeath, Ireland
- Los Angeles Buccaneers, a former National Football League team
- Reading Buccaneers Drum and Bugle Corps
- Tampa Bay Buccaneers, an American football team
- Charleston Southern Buccaneers, sports teams of Charleston Southern University
- Cape Cod Buccaneers, 1980s American ice hockey team
- Blackburn Buccaneers, an English ice hockey team
- Des Moines Buccaneers, an American ice hockey team
- Liverpool Buccaneers, an English rugby league team
- Oakland Buccaneers, an American soccer team
- Galveston Buccaneers, an American 1930s baseball team
- Christian Brothers Buccaneers and Lady Buccaneers, sports teams of Christian Brothers University
- New Orleans Buccaneers, American basketball team
- East Tennessee State Buccaneers and Lady Buccaneers, sports teams of East Tennessee State University
- Bucaneros de La Guaira, a Venezuelan basketball team
- Bukaneros, ultras (fans) of Rayo Vallecano, Spanish association football team

== Watercraft ==
- Buccaneer 200, an American keelboat design
- Buccaneer 210, an American keelboat design
- Buccaneer 220, an American keelboat design
- Buccaneer 240, an American keelboat design
- Buccaneer 245, an American keelboat design
- Buccaneer 250, an American keelboat design
- Buccaneer 255, an American keelboat design
- Buccaneer (dinghy), a type of light sailboat
- HMAS Buccaneer (P 100), a patrol boat of the Australian Navy
- USS Sapphire (PYc-2), originally named Buccaneer, a United States Navy patrol vessel of World War II

== Other uses ==
- Operation Buccaneer, an American government copyright anti-piracy project
- Buccaneer (musician) (Andrew Bradford; born 1974), Jamaican dancehall musician
