= Sonata (disambiguation) =

In music, a sonata is a musical piece which is played as opposed to sung.

Sonata may also refer to:

== Music ==
- Sonata form, a way of organizing the composition of a work of music
- Moonlight Sonata, composition by Ludwig van Beethoven
- Sonata Arctica, a Finnish power metal band

== Film, television and stage plays ==
- "Sonata" (Moonlight), a television episode
- Sonata Dusk, a character in My Little Pony: Equestria Girls - Rainbow Rocks
- Sonata (play), a one-act play by Indian playwright Mahesh Elkunchwar
- Sonatas (film), a 1959 Mexican-Spanish historical film

== Computing and software ==
- The Sonata I, II, and III, computer cases manufactured by Antec
- Sonata (software), a GTK+-based GUI for the Music Player Daemon
- Sonata Software, an Indian IT consulting and software services company
- Sonata (building design software), a 1980s 3D building design application
- Eternal Sonata, a 2007 Xbox 360 and 2008 PlayStation 3 game

== Vehicles ==
- Hunter Sonata, a small racing and cruising yacht built by British boat builder Hunter Boats
- Hyundai Sonata, a sedan automobile (saloon car) built by Hyundai Motor Company
- Sonata 6.7, an American sailboat design
- Sonata 8, an American sailboat design
- Sonata 26, an American sailboat design

== Other ==
- Sonata (given name)
- Zaleplon, tradename Sonata, a very short-acting sedative used for treatment of insomnia
- Sonata Watches, India's largest selling brand, made by Titan Industries
- Sonata, a 2019 comic book series, and its eponymous protagonist, created by David Hine and Brian Haberlin, and published by Image Comics
