= Triton 21 =

1980s American recreational keelboat

Development
- Designer: Clark Scarborough
- Location: United States
- Year: 1985
- Builder: Pearson Yachts
- Role: Racer-Cruiser
- Name: Triton 21

Boat
- Displacement: 1,700 lb (771 kg)
- Draft: 4.58 ft (1.40 m) with keel down

Hull
- Type: monohull
- Construction: fiberglass
- LOA: 21.25 ft (6.48 m)
- LWL: 18.00 ft (5.49 m)
- Beam: 8.00 ft (2.44 m)
- Engine: outboard motor

Hull appendages
- Keel: lifting keel
- Ballast: 200 lb (91 kg)
- Rudder: transom-mounted rudder

Rig
- Rig type: Bermuda rig
- I foretriangle height: 26.33 ft (8.03 m)
- J foretriangle base: 7.83 ft (2.39 m)
- P mainsail luff: 26.00 ft (7.92 m)
- E mainsail foot: 9.00 ft (2.74 m)

Sails
- Sailplan: fractional rigged sloop
- Mainsail area: 117.00 sq ft (10.870 m^{2})
- Jib/genoa area: 103.08 sq ft (9.576 m^{2})
- Total sail area: 220.08 sq ft (20.446 m^{2})

Racing
- PHRF: 201

The Triton 21, also called the Pearson 21, is a recreational keelboat first built in 1985. It was developed from the US Yachts US 21 in 1984, after Pearson Yachts bought the US Yachts line of boats, including the molds from Bayliner. It was built by Pearson Yachts in the United States, starting in 1985, but production ended soon after as the design didn't fit Pearson's marketing and the Triton line of boats was quickly discontinued. The company went bankrupt in 1991.

The fiberglass hull has a raked stem; an open, walk-through, reverse transom; a transom-hung rudder controlled by a tiller and a lifting keel. The boat has a draft of 4.58 ft (1.40 m) with the centerboard extended and 1.25 ft (0.38 m) with it retracted. It has a hull speed of 5.7 kn (10.6 km/h).

The design has sleeping accommodation for four people, with a double "V"-berth in the bow cabin and a two straight settee berths in the main cabin. The galley is located on the port side just aft of the bow cabin and is equipped with a sink. The head is located in the bow cabin on the port side under the "V"-berth. Cabin headroom is 48 in (122 cm).

It is a fractional sloop rig.
