= US Yachts US 18 =

1980s American recreational keelboat

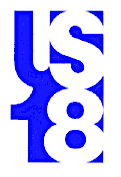

Development
- Designer: G. William McVay and Bayliner
- Location: United States
- Year: 1980
- Builder: US Yachts
- Role: Day sailer
- Name: US Yachts US 18

Boat
- Displacement: 525 lb (238 kg)
- Draft: 3.20 ft (0.98 m) with keel down

Hull
- Type: monohull
- Construction: fiberglass
- LOA: 17.58 ft (5.36 m)
- LWL: 15.58 ft (4.75 m)
- Beam: 6.67 ft (2.03 m)
- Engine: outboard motor

Hull appendages
- Keel: swing keel
- Rudder: transom-mounted rudder

Rig
- Rig type: Bermuda rig
- I foretriangle height: 16.75 ft (5.11 m)
- J foretriangle base: 6.00 ft (1.83 m)
- P mainsail luff: 17.00 ft (5.18 m)
- E mainsail foot: 9.00 ft (2.74 m)

Sails
- Sailplan: fractional rigged sloop
- Mainsail area: 76.50 sq ft (7.107 m^{2})
- Jib/genoa area: 50.25 sq ft (4.668 m^{2})
- Total sail area: 126.75 sq ft (11.775 m^{2})

The US Yachts US 18 is a recreational keelboat built by US Yachts starting in 1980, now out of production.

It is a Bayliner development of McVay's 1964 sailing dinghy design, the Mouette 19 and is similar to the Buccaneer 180.

The fiberglass hull has a raked stem, a reverse transom, a transom-hung rudder controlled by a tiller and a retractable swing keel. It has a small cuddy cabin. It has a draft of 3.20 ft (0.98 m) with the keel extended and 8 in (20 cm) with it retracted. It has a hull speed of 5.29 kn (9.80 km/h).

It has a fractional sloop rig.
