= Ranger 22 =

1979 recreational keelboat

Development
- Designer: Gary Mull
- Year: 1977
- Builders: Jensen Marine/Ranger Yachts; Mariner Construções Náuticas Ltd
- Name: Ranger 22

Boat
- Crew: Two
- Draft: 4.35 feet (1.30 m)

Hull
- Type: Fractional rigged sloop
- Construction: Fiberglass
- LOA: 22.50 ft (6.86 m)
- LWL: 17.58 feet (5.36 m)
- Beam: 7.83 ft (2.39 m)

Hull appendages
- Keel: fixed fin keel

Rig
- Rig type: Bermuda rig
- I foretriangle height: 25.75 ft (7.85 m)
- J foretriangle base: 8.50 ft (2.59 m)
- P mainsail luff: 26.00 ft (7.92 m)
- E mainsail foot: 7.42 ft (2.26 m)

Sails
- Mainsail area: 96.46 sq ft (8.961 m^{2})
- Jib/genoa area: 109.44 sq ft (10.167 m^{2})
- Total sail area: 205.90 sq ft (19.129 m^{2})

Racing
- PHRF: 225 (average)

The Ranger 22 is an International Offshore Rule Mini Ton class racer built by Jensen Marine/Ranger Yachts in the United States, starting in 1979 and was also produced in Brazil by Mariner Construções Náuticas Ltd.

== Design ==
The Ranger 22 is a small recreational keelboat, built predominantly of fiberglass, with wood trim. It has a fractional sloop rig, an internally-mounted rudder and a fixed fin keel. It displaces 2,183 lb (990 kg) and carries 900 lb (408 kg) of ballast.

The boat is normally fitted with a small 3 to 6 hp (2 to 4 kW) outboard motor for docking and maneuvering.

The design has sleeping accommodation for four people, with a double "V"-berth in the bow cabin and two straight settee berths in the main cabin. The galley is located on both sides just aft of the bow cabin. The galley is equipped with a two-burner stove to port and a sink to starboard. Cabin headroom is 48 in (122 cm).

The Ranger 22 has a PHRF racing average handicap of 225 with a high of 238 and low of 221. It has a hull speed of 5.62 kn (10.41 km/h).

The Ranger 22 design was developed into the US Yachts US 22 in 1979.

Mull said of the Ranger 22 design, "the basic parameter was fun. When we had a decision to make in the design office, we always asked, 'Is it going to contribute to making it more fun?'"

== Reception ==
In a 2010 review Steve Henkel wrote, "this boat, conceived by Gary Mull, a talented designer of fast sailboats, started out as the "Mull 22" and later became the Ranger 22 ... Best features: The Ranger's draft of 4' 3" and her slightly higher sail area, as well as tweaks such as a mainmast cross-section that reduces weight aloft while its turbulence stimulators (small bumps on the mast to help keep wind flow “attached” to the mainsail) help make the rig's aerodynamics more efficient, will make her closer-winded and faster upwind in light air compared to her comps. Unfortunately for racers, the handicappers have noticed this and have penalized the Ranger for these appealing qualities by reducing her PHRF by about a minute per mile. Worst features: Her small cockpit is good for racing but too small for a crowd lounging with beer and sandwiches when the racing is done."
