= Triton 25 =

1980s American recreational keelboat

Development
- Designer: Gary Mull
- Location: United States
- Year: 1984
- Builder: Pearson Yachts
- Name: Triton 25

Boat
- Displacement: 3,750 lb (1,701 kg)
- Draft: 4.25 ft (1.30 m)

Hull
- Type: Monohull
- Construction: Fiberglass
- LOA: 25.00 ft (7.62 m)
- LWL: 21.42 ft (6.53 m)
- Beam: 8.00 ft (2.44 m)

Hull appendages
- Keel: fin keel
- Ballast: 1,250 lb (567 kg)
- Rudder: internally-mounted spade-type rudder

Rig
- General: Masthead sloop
- I foretriangle height: 30.27 ft (9.23 m)
- J foretriangle base: 9.50 ft (2.90 m)
- P mainsail luff: 27.00 ft (8.23 m)
- E mainsail foot: 8.40 ft (2.56 m)

Sails
- Mainsail area: 113.40 sq ft (10.535 m^{2})
- Jib/genoa area: 143.78 sq ft (13.358 m^{2})
- Total sail area: 257.18 sq ft (23.893 m^{2})

Racing
- PHRF: 213 (average)

The Triton 25 is a recreational keelboat built by Pearson Yachts in the United States. First built in 1984, it is now out of production.

It is a development of the US Yachts US 25 and the Buccaneer 250, with the Triton 25 actually built from tooling and molds purchased from US Yachts.

The fiberglass hull has an internally-mounted spade-type rudder and a fixed fin keel. It has a draft of 4.25 ft (1.30 m) with the standard keel and 3.0 ft (0.91 m) with the optional shoal draft keel. It has a hull speed of 6.2 kn (11.48 km/h).

It has sleeping for five, with a small "V"-berth in the bow cabin, a main cabin, port side, drop-down dinette table that forms a double berth and a starboard, aft quarter berth. The galley is located on the starboard side amidships and is equipped with a two-burner stove and a sink. The enclosed head is located just aft of the bow cabin on the port side. Cabin headroom is 66 in (168 cm).

It has a masthead sloop rig.
