= US Yachts US 21 =

1980s American recreational keelboat

US 21
Development
- Designer: Clark Scarborough
- Location: United States
- Year: 1982
- Builder: US Yachts
- Role: Racer-Cruiser
- Name: US 21

Boat
- Displacement: 1,700 lb (771 kg)
- Draft: 4.58 ft (1.40 m) with keel down

Hull
- Type: monohull
- Construction: fiberglass
- LOA: 21.25 ft (6.48 m)
- LWL: 18.00 ft (5.49 m)
- Beam: 8.00 ft (2.44 m)
- Engine: outboard motor

Hull appendages
- Keel: lifting keel
- Ballast: 200 lb (91 kg)
- Rudder: transom-mounted rudder

Rig
- Rig type: Bermuda rig
- I foretriangle height: 26.33 ft (8.03 m)
- J foretriangle base: 7.83 ft (2.39 m)
- P mainsail luff: 26.00 ft (7.92 m)
- E mainsail foot: 9.00 ft (2.74 m)

Sails
- Sailplan: fractional rigged sloop
- Mainsail area: 117.00 sq ft (10.870 m^{2})
- Jib/genoa area: 103.08 sq ft (9.576 m^{2})
- Total sail area: 220.08 sq ft (20.446 m^{2})

Racing
- PHRF: 201

The US Yachts US 21 is a recreational keelboat built by US Yachts in the United States, starting in 1982, but production had ended by 1984 when the product line was sold to Pearson Yachts. The molds were the used to build the very similar Triton 21.

The US 21 design was developed into the Triton 21 in 1984, after Bayliner sold its US Yachts line of boats to Pearson Yachts.

== Design ==
The fiberglass hull has a raked stem; an open, walk-through, reverse transom; a transom-hung rudder controlled by a tiller and a lifting keel. The boat has a draft of 4.58 ft (1.40 m) with the centerboard extended and 1.25 ft (0.38 m) with it retracted. It has a hull speed of 5.7 kn (10.6 km/h).

It has sleeping accommodation for four people, with a double "V"-berth in the bow cabin and a two straight settee berths in the main cabin. The galley is located on the port side just aft of the bow cabin and is equipped with a sink. The head is located in the bow cabin on the port side under the "V"-berth. Cabin headroom is 48 in (122 cm).

It has a fractional sloop rig.

== Reception ==
In a 2010 review Steve Henkel wrote, "best features: The U.S. 21's light weight should make her relatively easy to trailer, launch. and retrieve, though perhaps not as easily as the Newport 212. Her PHRF rating, well below that of her comps, intimates that she is fast. Worst features: Her high SA/D. wide beam, and low ballast compared to her comps may mean she needs more beef on the rail in heavy air to keep her upright."
