= W21 (disambiguation) =

The W21 was a hydrogen bomb design for the US military.

W21 may also refer to:

- British NVC community W21, a scrub community in the British National Vegetation Classification system
- Mercedes-Benz W21, a German sedan
- Samsung W21 5G, a smartphone
- Wanderer W21, a German sedan
- Wilderness 21, an American sailboat
- The AIATSIS designation for the Tharrkari language
- The Wenninger index number for a Great dodecahedron
