= Concept 40 =

Sailboat class

Development
- Designer: Gary Mull
- Location: United States
- Year: 1981
- Builders: Concept Yachts; Hyundai
- Name: Concept 40

Boat
- Crew: Two
- Draft: 7.00 ft (2.13 m)

Hull
- Type: Masthead sloop
- Construction: Fiberglass
- LOA: 40.0 ft (12.2 m)
- LWL: 31.83 ft (9.70 m)
- Beam: 12.75 ft (3.89 m)

Hull appendages
- Keel: fixed wing keel

Sails
- Mainsail area: 306.18 sq ft (28.445 m^{2})
- Jib/genoa area: 462.68 sq ft (42.984 m^{2})
- Total sail area: 768.86 sq ft (71.429 m^{2})

Racing
- PHRF: 99

The Concept 40 is an American sailboat, that was designed by Gary Mull and first built in 1981. The design is out of production.

The design was developed into the Kalik 40 and the Ocean 40.

== Production ==
The boat was built by Concept Yachts in the United States, starting in 1981 and also by Hyundai of Seoul, South Korea.

== Design ==
The Concept 40 is a small recreational keelboat, built predominantly of fiberglass. It has a masthead sloop rig and a fixed wing keel. It displaces 19,000 lb (8,618 kg) and carries 9,100 lb (4,128 kg) of iron ballast. It is powered by a Pathfinder diesel engine of 42 hp (31 kW).

The boat has a PHRF racing handicap of 99. It has a hull speed of 7.56 kn (14.00 km/h).

== See also ==
- List of sailing boat types
