= Buccaneer 250 =

Sailboat class

Development
- Designer: Gary Mull
- Year: 1978
- Builder: Buccaneer Yachts/US Yachts
- Name: Buccaneer 250

Boat
- Crew: Two
- Displacement: 3,750 lb (1,701 kg)
- Draft: 4.67 ft (1.42 m) (conventional keel); 3.50 ft (1.07 m) (shoal-draft keel)

Hull
- Type: Masthead sloop
- Construction: Fiberglass
- LOA: 25.00 ft (7.62 m)
- LWL: 19.58 ft (5.97 m)
- Beam: 8.00 ft (2.44 m)

Hull appendages
- Keel: fin keel
- Ballast: 1,250 lb (567 kg)

Sails
- Mainsail area: 110.16 sq ft (10.234 m^{2})
- Jib/genoa area: 146.62 sq ft (13.621 m^{2})
- Total sail area: 256.78 sq ft (23.856 m^{2})

Racing
- PHRF: 219 (average)

The Buccaneer 250 is a recreational keelboat first built in 1978 by Buccaneer Yachts. The design is out of production.

== Design ==
Designed by Gary Mull, the fiberglass hull has a spade-type rudder, and a conventional fin keel giving a draft of 4.67 ft (1.42 m) or, optionally, a shoal-draft keel, giving a draft of 3.50 ft (1.07 m).

It displaces 3,750 lb (1,701 kg), carries 1,250 lb (567 kg) of ballast and has a hull speed of 6.2 kn (11.48 km/h).

The Buccaneer 250 has a PHRF racing average handicap of 219 with a high of 216 and low of 225.

It has a masthead sloop rig,

The design was later developed into the US Yachts US 25 and the Triton 25.

== Variants ==
Buccaneer 250
Version with an outboard motor, displacement of 3,750 lb (1,701 kg) and a length overall of 25.00 ft (7.62 m).
Buccaneer 255
Version with an inboard motor, displacement of 4,100 lb (1,860 kg) and a length overall of 25.50 ft (7.77 m).
