= Rocket 22 =

Sailboat class

- R22

Development
- Designer: Gary Mull and Don Martin
- Location: Canada
- Year: 2002
- No. built: 15
- Builder: Rocket Boats
- Name: Rocket 22

Boat
- Displacement: 1,600 lb (726 kg)
- Draft: 5.67 ft (1.73 m) maximum with keel down

Hull
- Type: Monohull
- Construction: Fibreglass
- LOA: 22.00 ft (6.71 m)
- LWL: 21.50 ft (6.55 m)
- Beam: 8.48 ft (2.58 m)

Hull appendages
- Keel: retractable bulb fin keel
- Ballast: 600 lb (272 kg)
- Rudder: transom-mounted rudder

Rig
- General: Fractional rigged sloop
- I foretriangle height: 28.83 ft (8.79 m)
- J foretriangle base: 9.00 ft (2.74 m)
- P mainsail luff: 30.50 ft (9.30 m)
- E mainsail foot: 12.00 ft (3.66 m)

Sails
- Mainsail area: 183.00 sq ft (17.001 m^{2})
- Jib/genoa area: 129.74 sq ft (12.053 m^{2})
- Total sail area: 312.74 sq ft (29.054 m^{2})

Racing
- PHRF: 108 (average)

The Rocket 22 is a Canadian trailerable sailboat, that was designed by American Gary Mull and Canadian Don Martin as a racer and first built in 2002.

The Rocket 22 is a development of Mull's 1983 Laminex Pocket Rocket design.

== Production ==
The boat was built by Rocket Boats in Canada, with 15 boats completed. The design is now out of production.

== Design ==
The Rocket 22 is a small recreational keelboat, built predominantly of fibreglass, with wood trim. It has a fractional sloop rig, an transom-hung rudder and a retractable bulb fin keel. It displaces 1,600 lb (726 kg) and carries 600 lb (272 kg) of ballast.

The boat has a draft of 5.67 ft (1.73 m) with the bulb keel down and 1.00 ft (0.30 m) with the keel retracted. It also features a retractable bowsprit for the large asymmetrical spinnaker.

The boat has a PHRF racing average handicap of 108 with a high of 138 and low of 93. It has a hull speed of 6.21 kn (11.50 km/h).

== See also ==
- List of sailing boat types

Related development

- Laminex Pocket Rocket
