= Hunter Boats =

Sailboat manufacturer

- Company type: Privately held company
- Industry: Boat building
- Founded: 1969
- Founder: Michael Polard
- Headquarters: Southampton, United Kingdom
- Products: Sailboats
- Parent: Lauren Marine
- Website: www.britishhunter.co.uk

Hunter Boats Limited is a British boat builder presently based in Southampton. The company specializes in the design and manufacture of glassfibre sailboats.

The company was founded by in 1969 by Michael Polard, as the Essex Boat Company. In 2009 it became a brand of Lauren Marine of Southampton under the name British Hunter.

== History ==
The first design produced by the new company was the Squib, an open keelboat designed by Oliver Lee in 1967. Lee also designed a cabin version of the Squib in 1972, the Hunter 19, later called the Europa. Lee was the principle naval architect for the company in this period, designing the Hunter 490 and the Hunter 701.

In the early 1970s the company relocated to Rochford and a custom-built plant in that town. At that time it was renamed Hunter Boats Limited and by 1975 David Thomas became the main designer. He drew the Hunter Sonata and the Impala 28.

In the mid-1970s the company produced many racing sailboats, including the designs of Steven Jones, including the Formula 28. His HB 31 was the first production boat to use kevlar laminates in its hull construction. By the 1980s the company started building boats with twin keels and moved away from racing boats to cruising boat designs. The Hunter Horizon 26 was the first of this new range of cruising sailboats and it won the Best Production Boat of the Year award when it was introduced in 1984. The Hunter Horizon 32 also won Best Production Cruiser of the Year in 1987 as the company continued to specialize in cruising sailboats.

In 1995 the company introduced the Thomas-designed Hunter 707 and the following year it was named Yacht of the Year.

Hunter Boats was bought out in 2003 by the Select Yachts Group and added to its portfolio of marine companies that included Cornish Crabbers, Red Fox Yachts, the Landau Launch Company and Cornish Diva.

In 2009 Lauren Marine of Southampton purchased the rights, molds and tooling for the Hunter range of boats and built them under the brand of British Hunter, to distinguish it from the American boat building company, Hunter Marine.

In 2018 the company was producing five designs, the Hunter 20 Sport, Hunter 20 Mini C, Hunter Channel 245, Hunter Channel 27 and the Hunter Channel 31.

== Boats ==
Summary of boats built by Hunter Boats:

- Squib 1967
- Hunter 701 (Lee) 1971
- Hunter 19 (Europa) 1972
- Hunter 490 (Lee) 1972
- Hunter Sonata 1976
- Impala 28 (Thomas) 1977
- Hunter Medina 20 1979
- Delta 25 (Hunter) 1980
- Hunter 32 (Jones) 1982
- Liberty 22 1982
- HB 31 1983
- Formula One (Jones) 1984
- Formula 28 1984
- Hunter Horizon 26 1984
- Duette 23 1984
- Hunter Horizon 32 1987
- Minstrel 23 1987
- Hunter Horizon 27 1988
- Hunter Horizon 27 OOD 1989
- Hunter Horizon 272 1993
- Hunter Horizon 273 1988
- Hunter Horizon 23 1989
- Red Fox 200 1990
- Channel 323 (Hunter) 1991
- Hunter Horizon 21 1992
- Hunter Horizon 30 1993
- Ranger 265 (Thomas) 1994
- Hunter 707 1995
- Pilot 27 1996
- Ranger 245 (Thomas) 1996
- Channel 27 (Hunter) 1999
- Channel 31 (Hunter) 2000
- Mystery 35 (Hunter) 2003
- Hunter 20 Fox C 2000s
- Hunter 20 Sport 2010s
- Hunter 20 Mini C 2010s
- Hunter Channel 245 2010s

== See also ==
- List of sailboat designers and manufacturers
