= Wilderness 38 =

Sailboat class

Development
- Designer: Gary Mull
- Location: United States
- Year: 1979
- No. built: at least one
- Builder: Wilderness Yachts
- Name: Wilderness 38

Boat
- Displacement: 9,000 lb (4,082 kg)
- Draft: 6.50 ft (1.98 m)

Hull
- Type: Monohull
- Construction: Fiberglass
- LOA: 38.25 ft (11.66 m)
- LWL: 30.00 ft (9.14 m)
- Beam: 12.00 ft (3.66 m)
- Engine: Yanmar 3GM30 diesel engine

Hull appendages
- Keel: fin keel
- Ballast: 4,500 lb (2,041 kg)
- Rudder: internally-mounted spade-type rudder

Rig
- General: Masthead sloop

Sails
- Total sail area: 596 sq ft (55.4 m^{2})

The Wilderness 38 is an American sailboat, that was designed by Gary Mull and first built in 1979.

== Production ==
The boat was built by Wilderness Yachts of Santa Cruz, California, United States, who completed at least one example. The design is now out of production.

The Wilderness 38 design was developed into the Wilderness 40 in 1980, using the same tooling.

== Design ==
The Wilderness 38 is a small recreational keelboat, built predominantly of fiberglass, with wood trim. It has a fractional sloop masthead sloop rig, an internally-mounted spade-type/transom-hung rudder and a fixed fin keel. It displaces 9,000 lb (4,082 kg) and carries 4,500 lb (2,041 kg) of lead ballast. The boat has a draft of 6.50 ft (1.98 m) with the standard fin keel.

The boat is fitted with a Japanese Yanmar 3GM30 diesel engine.

The design has sleeping accommodation for six people, with a double "V"-berth in the bow cabin, two straight settee berths in the main cabin and two single berths aft. The galley is located on the port side at the companionway ladder. The galley is L-shaped and is equipped with a three-burner stove, an ice box and a sink. A navigation station is opposite the galley, on the starboard side. The head is located just aft of the bow cabin.

The design has a hull speed of 7.34 kn (13.59 km/h).

== See also ==
- List of sailing boat types
