= Hiking (sailing) =

Sailing action

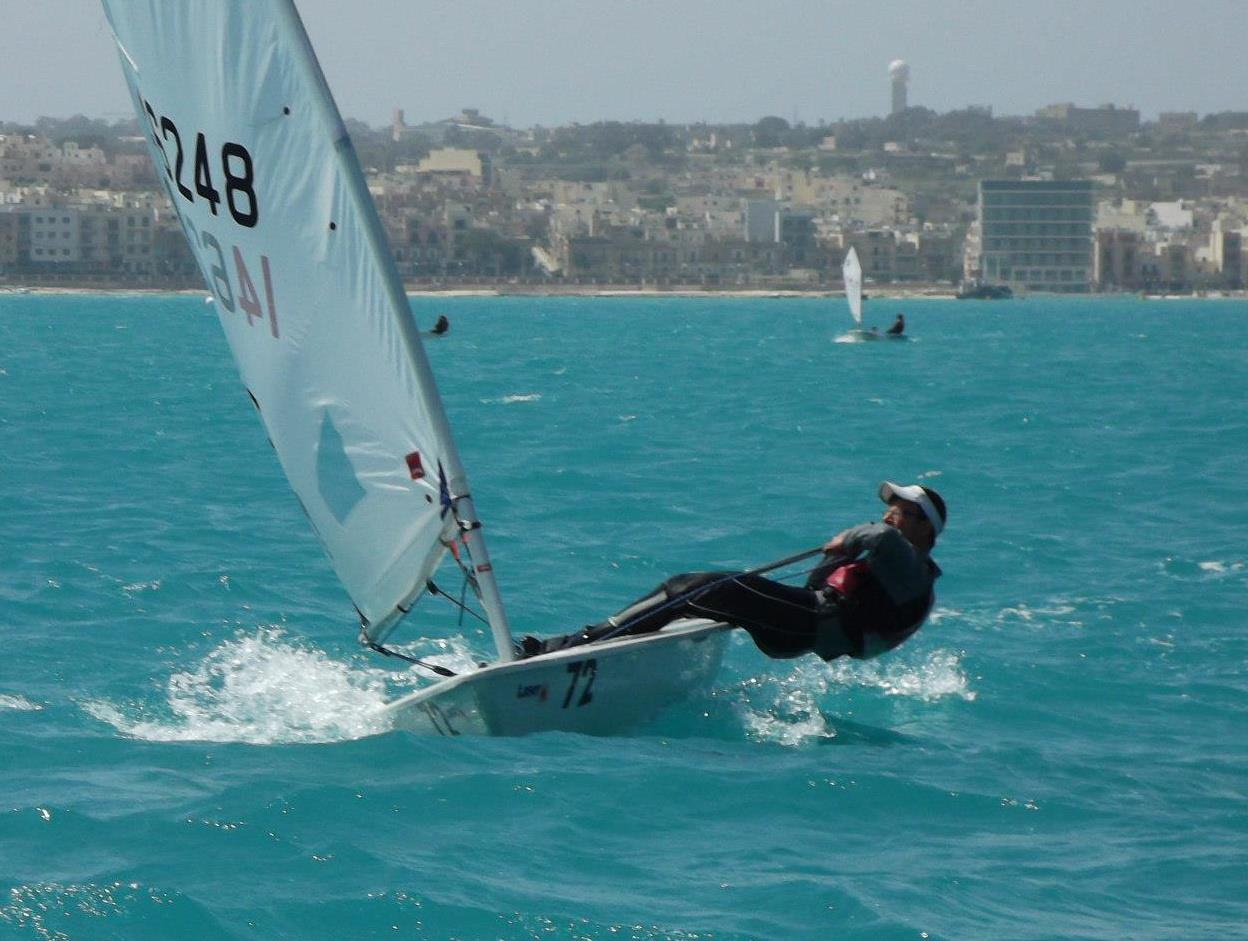
Hiking technique demonstrated on a Laser Radial.

In sailing, hiking (stacking or stacking out in New Zealand; leaning out or sitting out in United Kingdom) is the action of moving the crew's body weight as far to windward (upwind) as possible, in order to decrease the extent the boat heels (leans away from the wind). By moving the crew's weight to windward, the moment of that force around the boat's center of buoyancy is increased. This opposes the heeling movement of the wind pushing sideways against the boat's sails. It is usually done by leaning over the edge of the boat as it heels. Some boats are fitted with equipment such as hiking straps (or toe straps) and trapezes to make hiking more effective.

Hiking is most integral to catamaran and dinghy sailing, where the lightweight boat can be easily capsized or turtled by the wind unless the sailor counteracts the wind's pressure by hiking, or eases the sails to reduce it. The heavy keel on larger keelboats means that it is rare to capsize them due to wind alone, but keelboat racers will still hike to prevent unnecessary heeling, or leaning sideways to leeward, because the more vertical in the water the keel is, the more effective it is at keeping the boat moving in a forward direction and preventing it from drifting to leeward, slowing the boat due to drag, and potentially increasing the distance the boat must sail when beating. Improper heel creates a tendency for the boat to turn off course, necessitating a correction with the rudder, which also increases drag. Sails use wind most efficiently when they are at a proper heel, another reason for controlling heel.

== Hiking equipment ==
Many boats, especially dinghies, have equipment that facilitates effective hiking. Hiking straps (toe straps) made from rope or webbing hold the sailor's feet down, allowing them to lean back over the gunwale of the boat while sitting facing in. These simple devices are almost universal on dinghies that do not have more complex hiking systems. Some sailors wear special shorts fitted with pads or stiff battens to help them hike more effectively and without tiring.

Some dinghies and catamarans, such as the 505, 420, International 14, or Hobie 16, have a trapeze to allow the crew to increase their righting moment on the boat. These are wires attached high up on the mast, and fitted with a bracket that fits into a hook on a harness worn by the crew. This wire and harness then supports the crew as they stand and lean back over the water, pulling against the mast. On some boats, such as the Laser 2, the skipper uses hiking straps, and the crew uses a trapeze. On high-performance skiffs, such as the International 14 or 49er, both the skipper and the crew use trapezes.

Hiking boards are long boards fitted perpendicular to the boat's hull, and sometimes stretching several feet over the water. These allow the crew to move their weight far out to windward. They are commonly designed to slide from side to side, so they are moved to the windward side whenever the boat tacks. They are most often used on sailing canoes, but can be installed on many kinds of dinghy. there are also two racing classes that use planks and they are the VJ, and the bigger Skate (dinghy).

Some racing keelboats are fitted with elastic lifelines running down the sides of the boat. These allow the crew to lean into the lifeline to get further out on the windward rail. Many kinds of racing keelboat are raced with more crew aboard than is strictly necessary to operate the boat in order to increase the amount of weight on the upwind side of the boat, keeping the boat flatter.

A few high performance keelboats, such as the Moore 30 and the Kiwi 35, have structural hiking "wings" built into their hull, which allows a lower displacement hull and increased leverage for hiking. See Turtling.

On most dinghies the tiller is fitted with a tiller extension or hiking stick, which allows the skipper to steer the boat while hiked out.
