= Humboldt 30 =

Sailboat class

Development
- Designer: Gary Mull and Jim P. Donovan
- Location: United States
- Year: 1982-1984
- No. built: 6
- Builder: Humboldt Bay Yachts
- Name: Humboldt 30

Boat
- Crew: two
- Displacement: 5,050 lb (2,290 kg)
- Draft: 5.50 ft (1.68 m)

Hull
- Construction: Fiberglass
- LOA: 30.00 ft (9.14 m)
- LWL: 26.67 ft (8.13 m)
- Beam: 10.5 ft (3.2 m)

Hull appendages
- Keel: fin keel
- Ballast: 2,222 lb (1,008 kg)
- Rudder: transom hung rudder

Rig
- General: Fractional rigged sloop
- I foretriangle height: 37.50 ft (11.43 m)
- J foretriangle base: 11.50 ft (3.51 m)
- P mainsail luff: 41.50 ft (12.65 m)
- E mainsail foot: 13.80 ft (4.21 m)

Sails
- Mainsail area: 286.35 sq ft (26.603 m^{2})
- Jib/genoa area: 215.63 sq ft (20.033 m^{2})
- Total sail area: 501.98 sq ft (46.635 m^{2})

Racing
- PHRF: 102 (average)

The Humboldt 30, also called the Humboldt Bay 30, is an American sailboat, that was designed by Gary Mull and Jim P. Donovan. The design is out of production.

== Production ==
The boat was built by Humboldt Bay Yachts in the United States. Only six were constructed between the start of production in 1982 and 1984, when production ended.

== Design ==
The Humboldt 30 is a small racing keelboat, built predominantly of fiberglass, with a Klegecell closed cell, PVC foam core. It has a fractional sloop rig, a transom-hung rudder and a fixed fin keel. It displaces 5,050 lb (2,291 kg) and carries 2,222 lb (1,008 kg) of ballast. The boat has a draft of 5.50 ft (1.68 m).

The boat is fitted with a Japanese Yanmar 1GM diesel engine of 10 hp (7 kW).

The boat has a PHRF racing average handicap of 102 with a high of 98 and low of 106. It has a hull speed of 6.92 kn (12.82 km/h).

== See also ==
- List of sailing boat types
