= Kalik 44 =

Sailboat class

Development
- Designer: Gary Mull
- Location: United States
- Year: 1980
- Builder: Jachtwerf Vennekens
- Name: Kalik 44

Boat
- Displacement: 25,000 lb (11,340 kg)
- Draft: 6.50 ft (1.98 m)

Hull
- Construction: Fiberglass
- LOA: 44.00 ft (13.41 m)
- LWL: 37.08 ft (11.30 m)
- Beam: 13.75 ft (4.19 m)
- Engine: Perkins Engines diesel engine 50 hp (37 kW)

Hull appendages
- Keel: fin keel
- Ballast: 10,600 lb (4,808 kg)

Rig
- General: Masthead sloop
- I foretriangle height: 55.00 ft (16.76 m)
- J foretriangle base: 18.50 ft (5.64 m)
- P mainsail luff: 48.70 ft (14.84 m)
- E mainsail foot: 16.60 ft (5.06 m)

Sails
- Mainsail area: 404.21 sq ft (37.552 m^{2})
- Jib/genoa area: 508.75 sq ft (47.264 m^{2})
- Total sail area: 912.96 sq ft (84.817 m^{2})

Racing
- PHRF: 90 (average)

The Kalik 44 is a sailboat that was designed by Gary Mull and first built in 1980. The design is out of production.

The Kalik 44 is a development of the Kalik 40, with the hull lengthened and was developed into the Ocean 44.

== Production ==
The boat was built by Jachtwerf Vennekens in Belgium, starting in 1980.

== Design ==
The Kalik 44 is a small recreational keelboat, built predominantly of fiberglass, with wood trim. It has a masthead sloop rig, an internally mounted skeg rudder and a fixed fin keel. It displaces 25,000 lb (11,340 kg) and carries 10,600 lb (4,808 kg) of ballast. The boat has a draft of 6.50 ft (1.98 m).

The boat is fitted with a Perkins Engines diesel engine of 50 hp (37 kW).

The boat has a PHRF racing average handicap of 90. It has a hull speed of 8.16 kn (15.11 km/h).

== See also ==
- List of sailing boat types
