= Skate (dinghy) =

The Skate is a high performance two-person racing dinghy unique to Australia. Designed as a monohull sailboat it's fourteen feet long (4.27m) with a 7.2m mast, 1.8m bow pole and masthead asymmetrical spinnaker. It is an Australian national class.

Because of its small size and lightness it keeps the sailor close to the elements and at the edge of control when navigating water and wind. It makes for wild rides and a relative exhilarating experience of speed at 15 to 25 knots. Most Skates have a 10-foot-long hiking plank for the crew and an 8-foot plank for the skipper. Planks are slid across the hull from one side to the other when tacking and gybing. Other hiking configurations include short wings with two trapezes, longer wings with one trapeze, or trampolines. Many Skates now feature winged rudders to provide increased speed and stability in choppy conditions.

One of the top ranked websites quote: "Those who have sailed a Skate will testify that, they provide the most exciting and best sensation of speed of any monohull sailing boat. Even after graduating to other larger boats, people hold the Skate in high esteem. They remember it for providing the best ride they ever had on a sailing boat."

== History ==
The Skate sailing dinghy was designed in 1956. It is a two-man dinghy and was the original performance development class, with the sail plan created by J. Herrick and the hull by Vince Minter. Vince's idea was to design a boat that was easy to build, cost effective and would keep the older and bigger sailors of the day who were mainly sailing VJ's to stay on the water. And that was exactly the Skate did in those days. It offered high performance at an affordable price. Today Skates are regularly updated and take advantage of technological advances to maintain the "excitement" factor and original spirit. Skates are currently sailed in three states of NSW, WA and SA. Although boats still exist in Victoria, they are not sailed regularly and are older boats. Good class racing takes place at a number of clubs during the summer months.

The VJ and VS associations were not interested in adopting the Skate as a class, so the Skate association was formed in 1957 and 1958. The Skate itself was actually launched in 1956 and 14 races were held over the season with 14 wins against all comers from Lake Macquarie to Lake Illawarra. 1957/1958 saw three clubs sailing Skates. The first title was won by Ray Young at Georges River Sailing Club and the winning boat was the original Skate. The Skate class became more popular and boomed over the next couple of years culminated in the Australian titles being held at Nedlands Club in WA.

Skate sailing continues to be enjoyed by Australian sailors. The 2014, 57th Nationals were held at Port Dalrymple in Tasmania. David Luck and Anthony Sinton were the winning team. It was the ninth win for David Luck setting a new record for the most Skate National Championships won by an individual.

=== Design Development ===
The hull was redesigned and widened in 1971 by Doug Jefkins and the measurement tolerances were tightened, and the size of the mainsail and spinnaker were increased in 1983-84 season. The first fibreglass hulls appeared in 1971, with foam sandwich hulls being produced from 1979. During the 1990s the rig was lengthened and the sail plan modified to improve the aspect ratio. The class further evolved in 2000 with thoughts of using an asymmetrical spinnaker mounted from a bow pole. Skates are now configured with the taller rig and bow pole (either carbon fibre or aluminium, extendable or fixed depending on personal preference). These changes have made the Skate easier to sail, and crew weight is now less critical, as evidenced by the number of younger sailors competing at a high level in the fleet.

Also involved in building the original Skate were: Boat - Vince Minter Sails - Jack Herrick Spars - Ray Keating Skating Insignia - Bill Denman Naval Architect - Don Dixon

== Australian National Class Championships ==
In 1965 Chelsea Yacht Club adopts the "Skate" class yacht. It went on and became a strong and successful class, with Kim Clarke winning 2 Australian titles, John Manfield winning 2 Australian titles. The 1975 Victorian Championships were won by R. Drewett, who was sailing the Sabot "Woodstock II", by Don Ash in the GP14 Dinghy "Elan", by Kim Clarke in the Skate "Ratcatcher" and by Geoff Harris in the rainbow "Strangeways". A further 4 Victorian titles were also won.

The 57th Skate Nationals were held in 2014 at Port Dalrymple in Tasmania. David Luck and Anthony Sinton were the winning team. It was the ninth win for Dave - setting a record for the most Skate National Championships won by an individual, and the second for Anthony.
