= Kalik 40 =

Sailboat class

Development
- Designer: Gary Mull
- Location: South Korea
- Year: 1979
- Builder: Kyung-Il Yacht
- Name: Kalik 40

Boat
- Crew: Two
- Draft: 6.00 ft (1.83 m) (conventional keel)

Hull
- Type: Masthead sloop
- Construction: Fiberglass
- LOA: 39.6 ft (12.1 m)
- LWL: 31.83 ft (9.70 m)
- Beam: 12.75 ft (3.89 m)

Hull appendages
- Keel: fixed keel

Sails
- Mainsail area: 307.45 sq ft (28.563 m^{2})
- Jib/genoa area: 462.68 sq ft (42.984 m^{2})
- Total sail area: 770.13 sq ft (71.547 m^{2})

Racing
- PHRF: 96 (average)

The Kalik 40 is a sailboat, that was designed by Gary Mull and first built in 1979. The design is out of production.

The design was developed from the Concept 40 and provided the basis for the Kalik 44 and the Ocean 40.

== Production ==
The boat was built by Kyung-Il Yacht of South Korea.

== Design ==
The Kalik 40 is a small recreational keelboat, built predominantly of fiberglass. It has a masthead sloop rig, a spade-type rudder and a fixed keel, available in three different lengths. It displaces 16,600 lb (7,530 kg) and carries 7,700 lb (3,493 kg) of ballast. It is powered by a Perkins diesel engine of 42 hp (31 kW).

The boat has a PHRF racing average handicap of 96 with a high of 93 and low of 102. It has a hull speed of 7.56 kn (14.00 km/h).

== Variants ==
Kalik 40
Base model with a 6.00 ft (1.83 m) keel.
Kalik 40 DK
Model with a 6.25 ft (1.91 m) keel.
Kalik 40 VDK
Model with a 6.67 ft (2.03 m) keel.

== See also ==
- List of sailing boat types
