= Moore 30 =

Sailboat class

Development
- Designer: Gary Mull
- Location: United States
- Year: 1985
- No. built: 5
- Name: Moore 30

Boat
- Displacement: 2,000 lb (910 kg)
- Draft: 6.5 ft (2.0 m)

Hull
- Construction: Fiberglass
- LOA: 30.00 ft (9.14 m)
- LWL: 26.25 ft (8.00 m)
- Beam: 14 ft (4.3 m), including hiking wings

Hull appendages
- Keel: fin keel

Rig
- Rig type: Fractional rigged sloop Masthead sloop
- I foretriangle height: 36.50 ft (11.13 m)
- J foretriangle base: 11.00 ft (3.35 m)
- P mainsail luff: 38.50 ft (11.73 m)
- E mainsail foot: 13.75 ft (4.19 m)

Sails
- Mainsail area: 264.69 sq ft (24.591 m^{2})
- Jib/genoa area: 200.75 sq ft (18.650 m^{2})
- Total sail area: 465.44 sq ft (43.241 m^{2})

The Moore 30 is an American sailboat, that was designed by Gary Mull as a racer and first built in 1985.

== Production ==
The boat was built by Moore Sailboats in Watsonville, California, United States, starting in 1985. Only five were built and it is now out of production.

== Design ==
The Moore 30 is a small recreational keelboat, built predominantly of fiberglass. It has a fractional sloop rig and a fixed fin keel. It displaces 2,000 lb (907 kg) and carries 800 lb (363 kg) of ballast. The beam is 14 ft (4.3 m), including the boat's hiking wings.

The boat has a hull speed of 6.87 kn (12.72 km/h).

== See also ==
- List of sailing boat types
