= Microsail =

Micro class racing keelboat

Development
- Designer: Gary Mull
- Location: United States
- Year: 1980
- Builders: Jeanneau, C.N. Loire, Construction Navale Franck Roy, et al
- Role: Micro Class racing sailboat
- Name: Microsail

Boat
- Crew: two
- Displacement: 1,323 lb (600 kg)
- Draft: 3.61 ft (1.10 m) maximum

Hull
- Construction: Fiberglass
- LOA: 18.04 ft (5.50 m)
- LWL: 16.40 ft (5.00 m)
- Beam: 8.04 ft (2.45 m)

Hull appendages
- General: transom-mounted rudder
- Keel: lifting fin keel
- Ballast: 507 lb (230 kg)

Rig
- General: Fractional rigged sloop

The Microsail is a Micro Class racing keelboat first built by Jeanneau in France for French Micro Cup racing. It was later built by a number of companies, including C.N. Loire up until 2000. After 2000 it was only available as a kit for amateur construction until Construction Navale Franck Roy commenced building the design again in 2007.

Designed by Gary Mull the fiberglass hull has a transom-hung rudder.

The boat has a draft of 3.61 ft (1.10 m) with the lifting keel down and 0.66 ft (0.20 m) with the keel retracted. The boat has a hull speed of 5.43 kn (10.06 km/h).

It has a fractional sloop rig.
