= Triton 22 =

1980s American recreational keelboat

Development
- Designer: Gary Mull
- Year: 1985
- Builder: Pearson Yachts
- Name: Triton 22

Boat
- Crew: Two
- Draft: 4.10 feet (1.25 m)

Hull
- Type: Fractional rigged sloop
- Construction: Fiberglass
- LOA: 22.00 ft (6.71 m)
- LWL: 19.92 feet (6.07 m)
- Beam: 7.92 ft (2.41 m)

Sails
- Mainsail area: 93.75 sq ft (8.710 m^{2})
- Jib/genoa area: 107.88 sq ft (10.022 m^{2})
- Total sail area: 202 sq ft (18.8 m^{2})

Racing
- PHRF: 279

The Triton 22 is a recreational keelboat built for a short time starting in 1985 by Pearson Yachts, using the molds for the US Yachts US 22, from which it was derived. It has the same specifications as the US 22.

It has a fractional sloop rig and may be fitted with a spinnaker for downwind sailing.
