= New Zealand 45 =

Sailboat class

Development
- Designer: Gary Mull
- Location: United States
- Year: 1984
- Builder: New Zealand Yachts
- Name: New Zealand 45

Boat
- Displacement: 22,000 lb (9,979 kg)
- Draft: 8.00 ft (2.44 m)

Hull
- Construction: Fiberglass
- LOA: 45.00 ft (13.72 m)
- LWL: 36.50 ft (11.13 m)
- Beam: 13.75 ft (4.19 m)

Hull appendages
- General: internal spade-type rudder
- Keel: fin keel
- Ballast: 10,515 lb (4,770 kg)

Rig
- General: Masthead sloop
- I foretriangle height: 58.50 ft (17.83 m)
- J foretriangle base: 18.12 ft (5.52 m)
- P mainsail luff: 52.40 ft (15.97 m)
- E mainsail foot: 14.10 ft (4.30 m)

Sails
- Mainsail area: 369.42 sq ft (34.320 m^{2})
- Jib/genoa area: 530.01 sq ft (49.240 m^{2})
- Total sail area: 900 sq ft (84 m^{2})

The New Zealand 45 is a sailboat that was designed by American Gary Mull and first built in 1984. The design is out of production.

== Production ==
The boat was built by New Zealand Yachts in Whangārei, New Zealand, starting in 1984. A total of five were constructed.

== Design ==
The New Zealand 45 is a recreational keelboat, built predominantly of fiberglass. It has a masthead sloop rig, an internally-mounted spade-type rudder and a fixed fin keel. It displaces 22,000 lb (9,979 kg) and carries 10,515 lb (4,770 kg) of ballast. The boat has a draft of 8.00 ft (2.44 m).

The boat is fitted with a Pathfinder diesel engine of 50 hp (37 kW). It carries 80 U.S. gallons (300 L; 67 imp gal) of fuel and 200 U.S. gallons (760 L; 170 imp gal) of fresh water.

The boat has a hull speed of 8.1 kn (15.00 km/h).

== See also ==
- List of sailing boat types
