= Buccaneer 220 =

Sailboat class

Development
- Designer: Gary Mull
- Year: 1978
- Builder: Buccaneer Yachts/US Yachts
- Name: Buccaneer 220

Boat
- Crew: Two
- Draft: 3.00 feet (0.91 m)

Hull
- Type: Fractional rigged sloop
- Construction: Fiberglass
- LOA: 22.50 ft (6.86 m)
- LWL: 19.25 feet (5.87 m)
- Beam: 7.92 ft (2.41 m)

Sails
- Mainsail area: 95 sq ft (8.8 m^{2})
- Jib/genoa area: 109.56 sq ft (10.178 m^{2})
- Total sail area: 204.56 sq ft (19.004 m^{2})

Racing
- PHRF: 237 (average)

The Buccaneer 220 is an American trailerable sailboat, designed by Gary Mull and first built in 1978. The design is now out of production.

== Production ==
The boat was built by Buccaneer Yachts/US Yachts, a division of Bayliner, which is itself a division of the Brunswick Boat Group, which is in turn owned by the Brunswick Corporation.

The design was later developed into the US Yachts US 22.

== Design ==
The Buccaneer 220 is a small recreational keelboat, built predominantly of fiberglass, with wood trim. It has a fractional sloop rig, a transom hung rudder, a shoal-draft fin keel and may be fitted with a spinnaker for downwind sailing.

It displaces 2,450 lb (1,111 kg), carries 950 lb (431 kg) of ballast and has a hull speed of 5.88 kn (10.89 km/h).

The Buccaneer 220 has a PHRF racing average handicap of 237 with a high of 258 and low of 228.

== See also ==
- List of sailing boat types
