= US Yachts US 25 =

1980s American recreational keelboat

US 25
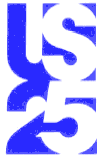

Development
- Designer: Gary Mull
- Location: United States
- Year: 1981
- Builder: US Yachts
- Name: US 25

Boat
- Crew: two
- Displacement: 3,750 lb (1,700 kg)
- Draft: 4.67 ft (1.42 m) with fin keel

Hull
- Construction: Fiberglass
- LOA: 25.00 ft (7.62 m)
- LWL: 21.42 ft (6.53 m)
- Beam: 8.00 ft (2.44 m)

Hull appendages
- Keel: fin keel
- Ballast: 1,250 lb (570 kg)

Rig
- General: Masthead sloop
- I foretriangle height: 30.27 ft (9.23 m)
- J foretriangle base: 9.50 ft (2.90 m)
- P mainsail luff: 27.00 ft (8.23 m)
- E mainsail foot: 8.33 ft (2.54 m)

Sails
- Mainsail area: 112.46 sq ft (10.448 m^{2})
- Jib/genoa area: 143.78 sq ft (13.358 m^{2})
- Total sail area: 256.24 sq ft (23.805 m^{2})

Racing
- PHRF: 216

The US Yachts US 25 is a recreational keelboat first built in 1981 by Bayliner and now of production.

Derived from the Buccaneer 250, it was later developed into Pearson Yachts' Triton 25.

Designed by Gary Mull, the fiberglass hull has an internally-mounted spade-type rudder. It has a hull speed of 6.2 kn (11.48 km/h). It has a hull speed of 6.2 kn (11.5 km/h).

It has sleeping accommodation for five people, with a small "V"-berth. The cabin has a teak and holly sole. The enclosed head is located just aft of the bow cabin on the port side. Cabin headroom is 66 in (168 cm).

It has a masthead sloop rig.

== Variants ==
US 25
Model with standard fin keel, giving a draft of 4.67 ft (1.42 m). This model has a PHRF racing average handicap of 216.
US 25 SD
Model with a shoal draft keel giving a draft of 2.67 ft (0.81 m). This model has a PHRF racing average handicap of 237.
US 25 CB
Model with a retractable centerboard giving a draft of 2.67 ft (0.81 m). This model has a PHRF racing average handicap of 234.
