= Chico 30 =

Sailboat class

Development
- Designer: Gary Mull
- Year: 1970
- Builder: Keith Eade
- Name: Chico 30

Boat
- Crew: Two
- Draft: 4.92 ft (1.50 m)

Hull
- Type: Masthead sloop
- Construction: Fibreglass
- LOA: 30.54 ft (9.31 m)
- LWL: 26.97 ft (8.22 m)
- Beam: 9.51 ft (2.90 m)

The Chico 30 is a sailboat, that was designed by American Gary Mull and first built in 1970.

== Production ==
The boat was built by Keith Eade of New Zealand, who constructed a total of 70 examples of the design, starting in 1970, but is now out of production.

== Design ==
The Chico 30 is a small recreational keelboat, built predominantly of fibreglass, with a plywood deck. It has a masthead sloop rig, a transom hung rudder and a conventional fin keel. It displaces 10,079 lb (4,572 kg) and carries 5,340 lb (2,422 kg) of ballast.

The design has a hull speed of 6.96 kn (12.89 km/h).

== See also ==
- List of sailing boat types
