= Aero 20 =

Sailboat class

Development
- Designer: Gary Mull
- Year: 1999
- Builder: Catalina Yachts

Boat
- Crew: Two
- Draft: 4.00 ft (1.22 m)

Hull
- Type: Fractional rigged sloop
- Construction: Fiberglass
- LOA: 20.50 ft (6.25 m)
- LWL: 17.75 ft (5.41 m)
- Beam: 8.00 ft (2.44 m)

The Aero 20 is a recreational keelboat designed by Gary Mull as a daysailer. It was first built in 1999.

== Production ==
The boat was built by Catalina Yachts starting in 1999, but has since ceased production.

== Design ==
The Aero 20 is built predominantly of fiberglass. It has a fractional sloop rig, a transom hung rudder and a conventional fin keel giving a draft of 4.00 ft (1.22 m). The hull design was based on the Independence 20, a boat designed by Mull for disabled sailors.

The boat is rigged with the unusual "aero rig", whereby the main and jib sails are on a common fore-and-aft boom.

The design displaces 2,250 lb (1,021 kg) and carries 700 lb (318 kg) of ballast. It has a hull speed of 5.65 kn (10.46 km/h).
