= Independence 20 =

Sailboat class

Development
- Designer: Gary Mull
- Location: United States
- Year: 1999
- Builders: Tillotson Pearson Inc (Freedom Yachts) and later Catalina Yachts
- Role: Disabled sail training and racing
- Name: Independence 20

Boat
- Displacement: 2,080 lb (940 kg)
- Draft: 4.00 ft (1.22 m)

Hull
- Construction: Fiberglass
- LOA: 20.5 ft (6.2 m)
- LWL: 17.75 ft (5.41 m)
- Beam: 8.00 ft (2.44 m)

Hull appendages
- Ballast: 900 lb (410 kg)

Rig
- General: Free-standing fractional rigged sloop

Sails
- Total sail area: 230 sq ft (21 m^{2})

The Independence 20, also called the Freedom Independence 20, is an American trailerable sailboat, that was designed by Gary Mull as a class for disabled sailors and first built in 1999. The design is out of production.

The Independence 20 shares the same hull as the Catalina Yachts-built Aero 20.

== Production ==
The boat was initially built by Tillotson Pearson in the United States for Freedom Yachts and later built by Catalina Yachts.

== Design ==
The Independence 20 is a small recreational keelboat, built predominantly of fiberglass. It has a fractional sloop rig, a transom-hung rudder and a fixed fin keel. It displaces 2,080 lb (943 kg) and carries 900 lb (408 kg) of ballast.

The boat has a draft of 4.00 ft (1.22 m). The accommodation consists of two seats that are both pivoting and counterweighted, allowing side-to-side movement during tacking and gybing.

The design has a hull speed of 5.65 kn (10.46 km/h).

== See also ==
- List of sailing boat types

Related development

- Aero 20
