= Gary Mull =

American yacht designer

Gary Mull (September 27, 1937 – July 14, 1993) was an American yacht designer who created many popular fiberglass sailboats.

== Early life and education ==
Gary Mull began his college career with a year at Pomona College as an English major, then moved to Oakland City College after taking time off for a sailboat race to Tahiti. He finished his degree as a mechanical engineer with a naval architecture minor at UC Berkeley.

== Design career ==
Santana 22 (1965) and 27 (1966), also the 37. Mull's first sailboat design, the 22, was a breakthrough design that cemented Santana sailboats and their parent, W.D. Schock, as an icon of the West Coast marine industry. The first generation of Ranger designs noted below bear a strong resemblance to these boats.

The Ranger 22 (1977), 23 (1971), 26 (1969), 29 (1970), 32 (1973), 33 (1970), and 37 (1972). Most of these were cruiser-racers built to no particular handicap rule, but they rate favorably under PHRF and Portsmouth handicap and have been quite successful in local club racing. Mull himself described most of his designs as 'just nice little boats'. The Ranger 26 won the North American IOR 1/2 Ton Cup in 1970 and is still competitive today in PHRF. The Ranger 23 came in second in the North American IOR 1/4 Ton Cup in 1972 even though she wasn't designed to the IOR Rule. The Ranger 23 also won the Whitney Series in 1972, and is still very competitive in PHRF handicap racing. The Ranger 29 and 33 have always been competitive when well sailed and are still competitive in club racing. The Ranger 37 was designed to the IOR handicap rule and was the last production boat to win the Southern Ocean Racing Conference (SORC is a winter ocean race out of Miami, Florida). The Ranger 32 is still competitive under PHRF handicap. While the Ranger 29 was designed to rate well under a number of handicap rules including the CCA and IOR, the boat does not fare so well under Portsmouth or PHRF.

In 1967, the one-off Mull 30, a mahogany strip planked sloop designed for the St. Francis Yacht Club in San Francisco scored an impressive win during the famous 1969 Miami to Nassau SORC race besting all the other class favorites and larger ocean classes. The success of the boat design was recreated known as Belvedere 30 in fiberglass by local San Francisco boat builder and rigging specialist Hank Easom. The hull design continued with modernized cabin top configurations to become the popular Chico 30 built in New Zealand. Many Chico 30s have been successfully campaigned and even circumnavigated the globe.

The Newport 30 (and its stretched version, the 33) were another project by Mull. The 30 bears strong family resemblance to both the Ranger 29 and 33, but with more beam and displacement it leans to the cruiser side of the spectrum.

Mull also designed the Freedom Independence, 28, 30, 36, 42 and 45, as well as the Buccaneer 220, 250 and 255. The Buccaneer 220 and 250 were later developed into the US Yachts US 22 and US 25, respectively. The US 22 was later developed into the Triton 22.

Later designs from the Gary Mull office included the somewhat revolutionary Humboldt 30 and Pocket Rocket. These designs were produced while Jim Donovan and Peter Dunsford were working for Mull. The Pocket Rocket hull and some parts of the deck have been resurrected and it is now sold as the Rocket 22. The boat has been 'turboed' a bit and is still a strong performer. A large fleet of the original Pocket Rockets carries on racing in Penticton, British Columbia.

Other designs include: 6-Meter match racers St. Francis IV, V, and VI; 6-meter Ranger, built by Goetz Custom Yachts and raced by Ted Turner in the 1979 6-Meter Worlds; The Wilderness 40, built by Wilderness Boat Works in Santa Cruz, California in 1980; Capri 22 designed with Catalina's Frank Butler in 1983, of which over 800 were built; Kalik 44, a large and fast cruising yacht with 25,000Lbs displacement; Half-Tonner Hotflash, built by the Gougeon Brothers in 1976; Two-Tonners like Carrot (1976), the 12-Meter USA; and the maxi-boat Sorcery. He also worked on the Golden Gate Challenge 12-Meter program for the 1987 America's Cup and designed a high-performance 30-foot, ultralight (2,000-pound) sloop for Ron Moore which featured a winged keel and deck.

From 1979 to 1987, Mull chaired the International Technical Committee (ITC) of the Offshore Racing Congress.

Mull's last Ranger design was in 1981 with Bangor Punta Yachts where 80 were made in the 26 foot length.

Carl Schumacher, best known for his Express series, Jim Antrim, Peter Dunsford, Jim Donovan, Phil Kaiko and Ron Holland all apprenticed under Mull.

== Death ==
Mull died of lung cancer on July 14, 1993, at age 55.

== Designs ==
Sailboats designed by Mull, with years first built:

- Aero 20 (1999)
- Buccaneer 220 (1978)
- Buccaneer 250 (1978)
- Buccaneer 255 (1978)
- Capri 22 (1984)
- Chico 30 (1970)
- Concept 40 (1981)
- Dione 98 (1970)
- Freedom 28 (1986)
- Freedom 30 (1986)
- Freedom 32 (1988)
- Freedom 36 (1985)
- Freedom 36 Cat Ketch (1985)
- Freedom 38 (1989)
- Freedom 42 (1987)
- Freedom 45 (1987)
- Humboldt 30 (1982)
- Independence 20 (1999)
- Kalik 40 (1979)
- Kalik 44 (1980)
- Laminex Pocket Rocket (1983)
- Microsail (1980)
- Moore 30 (1985)
- New Zealand 45 (1984)
- Newport 20 (1968)
- Newport 30-1 (1968)
- Newport 30-2 (1974)
- Newport 30-3 (1984)
- Newport 31 (1987)
- Newport 33 (1971)
- Newport 33 PH (1971)
- Ocean 40 (1979)
- Orion 50 (1983)
- Ranger 16 (1987)
- Ranger 22 (1977)
- Ranger 23 (1971)
- Ranger 26 (1969)
- Ranger 26-2 (1980)
- Ranger 28 (1976)
- Ranger 29 (1971)
- Ranger 32 (1973)
- Ranger 33 (1969)
- Ranger 37 (1973)
- Rocket 22 (2002)
- Santana 22 (1966)
- Santana 27 (1967)
- Santana 37 (1969)
- Santana 39 (1972)
- Sonata 26 (1980)
- Sonata 6.7 (1986)
- Sonata 8 (1979)
- Triton 22 (1985)
- Triton 25 (1984)
- US Yachts US 22 (1979)
- US Yachts US 25 (1981)
- Wilderness 38 (1979)
- Wilderness 40 (1980)
