= Ocean 40 =

Sailboat class

Development
- Designer: Gary Mull
- Location: United States
- Year: 1979
- Builder: Kyung-Il Yachts
- Name: Ocean 40

Boat
- Displacement: 19,000 lb (8,618 kg)
- Draft: 7.00 ft (2.13 m)

Hull
- Construction: Fiberglass
- LOA: 40.00 ft (12.19 m)
- LWL: 31.83 ft (9.70 m)
- Beam: 12.75 ft (3.89 m)

Hull appendages
- General: internally-mounted spade-type rudder
- Keel: fin keel
- Ballast: 9,100 lb (4,128 kg)

Rig
- General: Masthead sloop
- I foretriangle height: 53.80 ft (16.40 m)
- J foretriangle base: 17.20 ft (5.24 m)
- P mainsail luff: 48.60 ft (14.81 m)
- E mainsail foot: 12.60 ft (3.84 m)

Sails
- Mainsail area: 306.18 sq ft (28.445 m^{2})
- Jib/genoa area: 462.68 sq ft (42.984 m^{2})
- Total sail area: 768.86 sq ft (71.429 m^{2})

The Ocean 40 is a sailboat, that was designed by Gary Mull for the yacht charter industry and first built in 1979. It is a development of the Concept 40 and the Kalik 40, both Mull designs.

== Production ==
The boat was built by Kyung-Il Yachts in South Korea, starting in 1979, but is now out of production.

== Design ==
The Ocean 40 is a recreational keelboat, built predominantly of fiberglass. It has a masthead sloop rig, an internally-mounted spade-type rudder and a fixed fin keel. It displaces 19,000 lb (8,618 kg) and carries 9,100 lb (4,128 kg) of ballast.

The boat has a draft of 7.00 ft (2.13 m) with the standard fin keel. It has a hull speed of 7.56 kn (14.00 km/h).

== See also ==
- List of sailing boat types

Related development

- Concept 40
- Kalik 40
