= Hunter Sonata =

Sailboat class

The Hunter Sonata 7 is a 7 m (23 ft) small racer-cruiser yacht built in Britain from 1976 to 1990 by Hunter Boats Limited (now British Hunter). The twin-keeled version is known as the Hunter Duette.

The Sonata was designed by David Thomas, and is a One-Design, Cruiser-Racer Class. It has a glass-fibre hull, with a low-profile glass-fibre deck, a Bermuda rigged aluminium mast, and an iron keel (or keels). It has a relatively large sail area and the rig is a fractional one. When fitted for cruising it has four berths, with two further occasional bunks. Mechanical power is provided by a demountable outboard motor mounted on a sliding bracket on the port side of the transom.

The Sonata was built in several forms, with a fin keel, a lifting keel, and as a bilge keeler (with twin keels), when it was called the Hunter Duette. The Duette was fitted out for cruising rather than racing. The Duette was also available with a lifting keel. The same hull was used later with different deck mouldings for other models, including the Hunter Horizon 23. The 6 m (20 ft) Hunter Medina is a scaled-down trailer sailer version of the Sonata design.

== Key dimensions ==
- Length (LOA): 6.90 m
- Length on waterline: 5.60 m
- Beam: 2.60 m
- Sail area: 19.5 m²
- Draught: 1.37m (fin keel)
- Weight: 1115 kg

== Racing ==
The Sonata is a National class in the United Kingdom and is raced across the country. The class is governed by the National Sonata Association in conjunction with the Royal Yachting Association.

=== Fleets ===
There are at least 17 fleets in the world, 15 of which are in the United Kingdom

- Abersoch
- Brightlingsea
- Brixham
- Burnham-on-Crouch
- Christchurch Sailing Club
- Loch Lomond Sailing Club
- Clyde
- Cowes
- Dublin
- Hong Kong
- Isle of Man
- Itchenor
- Medway
- Moray Firth
- Poole
- Scarborough
- South Coast (Hamble & Solent)
- Strangford Lough Yacht Club
- Sunderland
- Tay
- West Mersea
- Windermere
- Whitby
- Weymouth (Castle Cove SC)

=== UK National Champions ===
Year	Championship Location	Owner	Boat
1977	Harwich YC, East Coast	B L Waples	More Sparks
1978	Island SC, Cowes	P White	Parady
1979	Clyde	C Phillips	Thingummyjig
1980	Haven Ports YC, East Coast	H Sellars	Cimaruta
1981	Hayling Island SC	M Harrison	Jiminy Cricket
1982		G Evans & C Penfold	Scherzo
1983		R D Jorpe	Duette
1984		M J Forbes	Mickey Finn II
1985			
1986		P Marchant	Mariba
1987		P Marchant	Mariba
1988		E Witherow	Oh Puss One
1989		I Gray	Ghostbuster
1990		MJ Young & JW Dudley	Aeolian
1991	Scarborough	I Gray	Ghostbuster
1992	Windemere	M Hart	Jabiru
1993	Island SC, Cowes	M Hart	Jabiru
1994	Clyde	Steve Goacher	Eric the Boat
1995	Dabchicks S.C, West Mersea	Steve Goacher	Eric the Boat
1996	Windemere	Steve Goacher	Eric the Boat
1997	Hamble River SC, Solent	Steve Goacher	Eric the Boat
1998	Clyde	Steve Goacher	Eric the Boat
1999	Dabchicks S.C, West Mersea	Steve Goacher	Eric the Boat
2000	Strangford Lough Y.C, Killinchy	Steve Goacher	Eric the Boat
2001	Medway Y.C, Rochester	Steve Goacher	Eric the Boat
2002	Royal Tay Y.C, Dundee	Steve Goacher	Eric the Boat
2003	Royal Southern Yacht Club, Solent	Tom White	Pizzicato
2004	Strangford Lough Y.C., Killinchy	Steve Goacher	Eric the Boat
2005	Abersoch, Wales	Steve Goacher	Eric the Boat
2006	Dabchicks S.C., West Mersea	Steve Goacher	Eric the Boat
2007	Sunderland Y.C.	Steve Goacher	Eric the Boat
2008	Strangford Lough Y.C., Killinchy	Dave Boatman	Blue Tack
2009	Poole Y.C., Poole	Dave Boatman	Blue Tack
2010	Helensburgh, Clyde	Steve Goacher	Eric the Boat
2011	Dabchicks S.C., West Mersea	Simon Farren & Marc Purdie	Camel Toe
2012	Medway Y.C., Rochester	Joe Cross	Presto
2013	Strangford Lough Y.C., Killinchy	Andy Tunnicliffe	Eric the Boat
2014	Brixham Y.C., Brixham	Steve Goacher	Eric the Boat
2015	Helensburgh, Clyde	Steve Goacher	Eric the Boat
2016	Poole Y.C., Poole	Steve Goacher	Eric the Boat
2017	Strangford Lough Y.C, Co. Down	Steve Goacher	Eric the Boat
2018	Medway Y.C., Rochester	Joe Cross	Exposition
2019	Helensborough S.C, Clyde	Steve Goacher	Eric the Boat
2020	COVID19	NOT	HELD
2021	Island S.C, Cowes	Max Richardson	Little Scarlet
2022	Colne Y.C, Brightlingsea	Jonny Hewat/Lucian Stone	White Noise
2023	Parkstone Y.C, Poole	Tony Woods	Frankie The Rhino
2024	Medway Y.C, Rochester	Joe Cross/ Russell Wheeler	Duette
2025	Castle Cove S.C, Weymouth	Joe Cross/ Russell Wheeler	Duette
2026	Royal Southern, Hamble	Joe Cross/ Russell Wheeler	Duette
