= Laminex Pocket Rocket =

Sailboat class

Pocket Rocket
Development
- Designer: Gary Mull
- Location: United States
- Year: 1983
- Builder: Laminex Industries
- Role: Racing sailboat

Boat
- Displacement: 2,400 lb (1,089 kg)
- Draft: 5.00 ft (1.52 m)

Hull
- Construction: Fiberglass
- LOA: 22.00 ft (6.71 m)
- LWL: 21.50 ft (6.55 m)
- Beam: 9.50 ft (2.90 m)

Hull appendages
- General: transom-mounted rudder
- Ballast: 1,100 lb (499 kg)

Rig
- General: Fractional rigged sloop
- I foretriangle height: 27.00 ft (8.23 m)
- J foretriangle base: 8.00 ft (2.44 m)
- P mainsail luff: 28.80 ft (8.78 m)
- E mainsail foot: 10.40 ft (3.17 m)

Sails
- Mainsail area: 149.76 sq ft (13.913 m^{2})
- Jib/genoa area: 108.00 sq ft (10.034 m^{2})
- Total sail area: 257.76 sq ft (23.947 m^{2})

Racing
- PHRF: 174 (average)

The Laminex Pocket Rocket is an American sailboat, that was designed by Gary Mull and first built in 1983. The design is out of production.

== Production ==
The boat was built by Laminex Industries in the United States, starting in 1983. It was developed into the Rocket 22 in 2004.

== Design ==
The Pocket Rocket is a small racing keelboat, built predominantly of fiberglass. It has a fractional sloop rig, a transom-mounted rudder and a fixed fin keel. It displaces 2,400 lb (1,089 kg) and carries 1,100 lb (499 kg) of ballast. The boat has a draft of 5.00 ft (1.52 m).

The boat has a PHRF racing average handicap of 174 with a high of 178 and low of 165. It has a hull speed of 6.21 kn (11.50 km/h).

== See also ==
- List of sailing boat types
