= Capri 22 =

Sailboat class

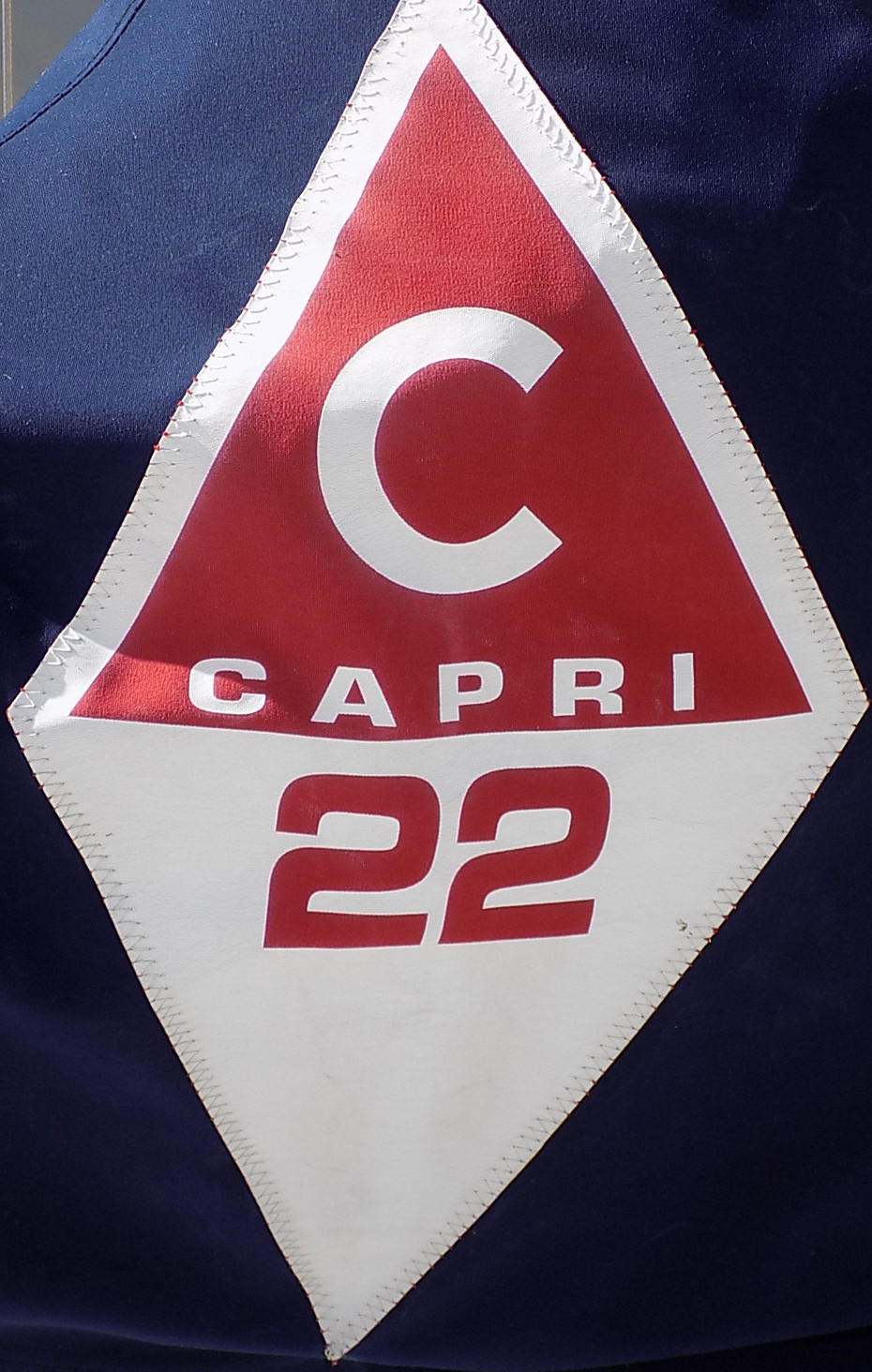
- Class symbol

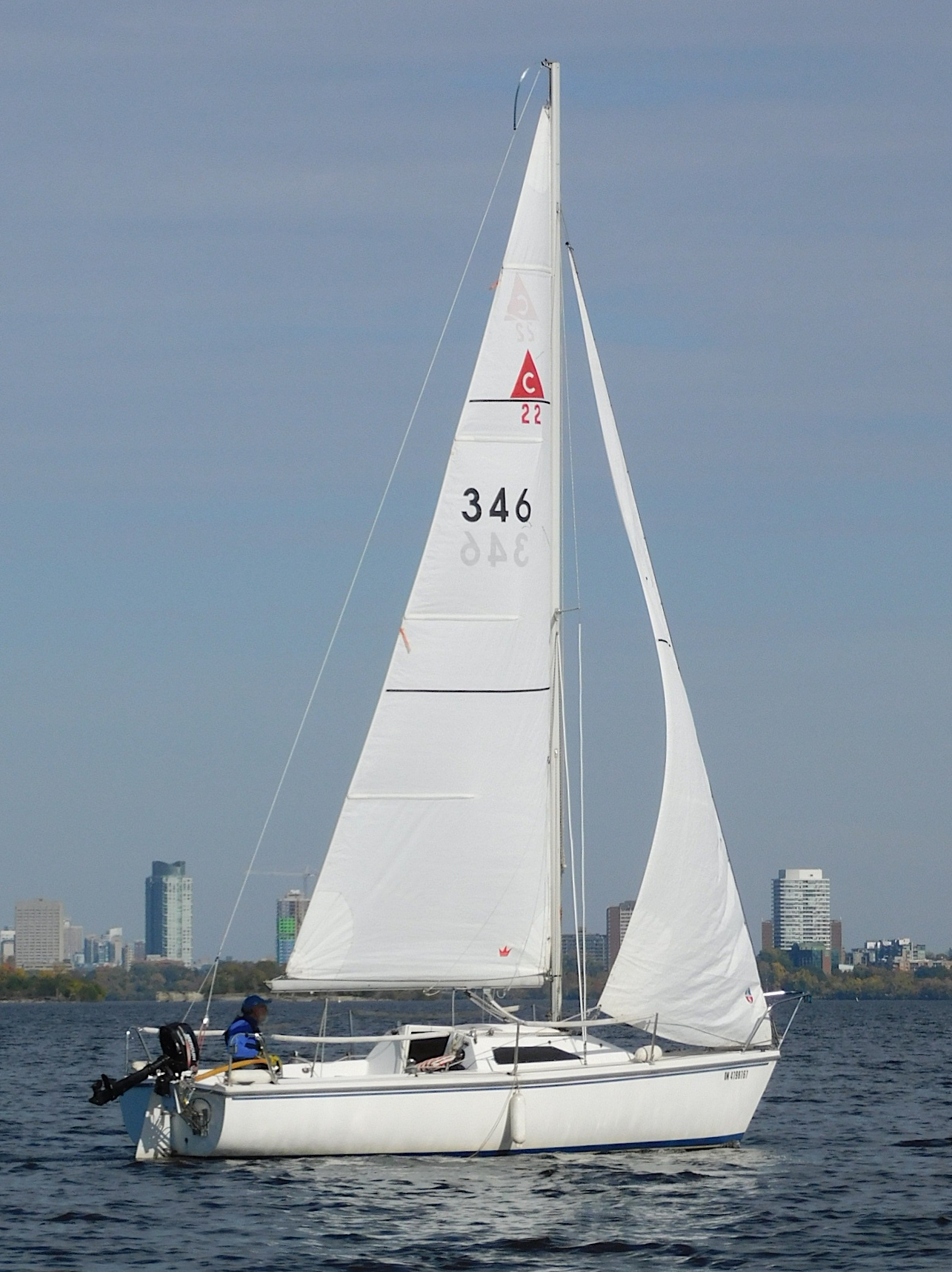

Development
- Designer: Gary Mull and Frank Butler
- Year: 1984
- No. built: 1800
- Builder: Catalina Yachts
- Name: Capri 22

Boat
- Crew: Two
- Draft: 4.00 ft (1.22 m) (conventional keel), 2.50 ft (0.76 m) (shoal and winged keel)

Hull
- Type: Fractional rigged sloop
- Construction: Fiberglass
- LOA: 22.00 ft (6.71 m)
- LWL: 20.00 ft (6.10 m)
- Beam: 8.00 ft (2.44 m)

Sails
- Mainsail area: 126.75 sq ft (11.775 m^{2})
- Jib/genoa area: 102.00 sq ft (9.476 m^{2})
- Total sail area: 228.75 sq ft (21.252 m^{2})

Racing
- PHRF: 201

The Capri 22 is an American trailerable sailboat, that was designed by Gary Mull and Frank Butler and first built in 1984.

== Production ==
The boat was first built by Catalina Yachts of Hollywood, California in 1984 and remains in production.

== Design ==
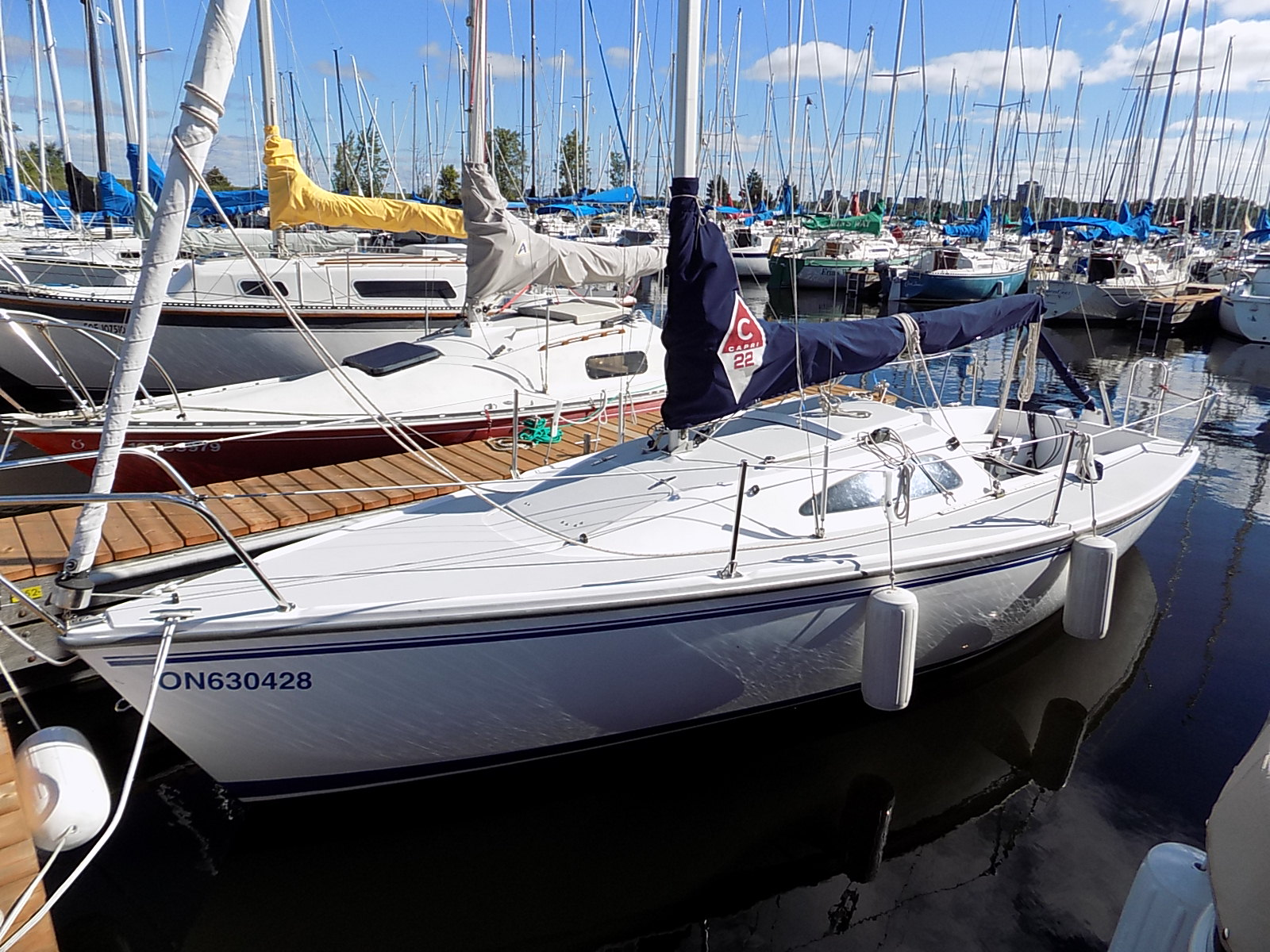
Capri 22

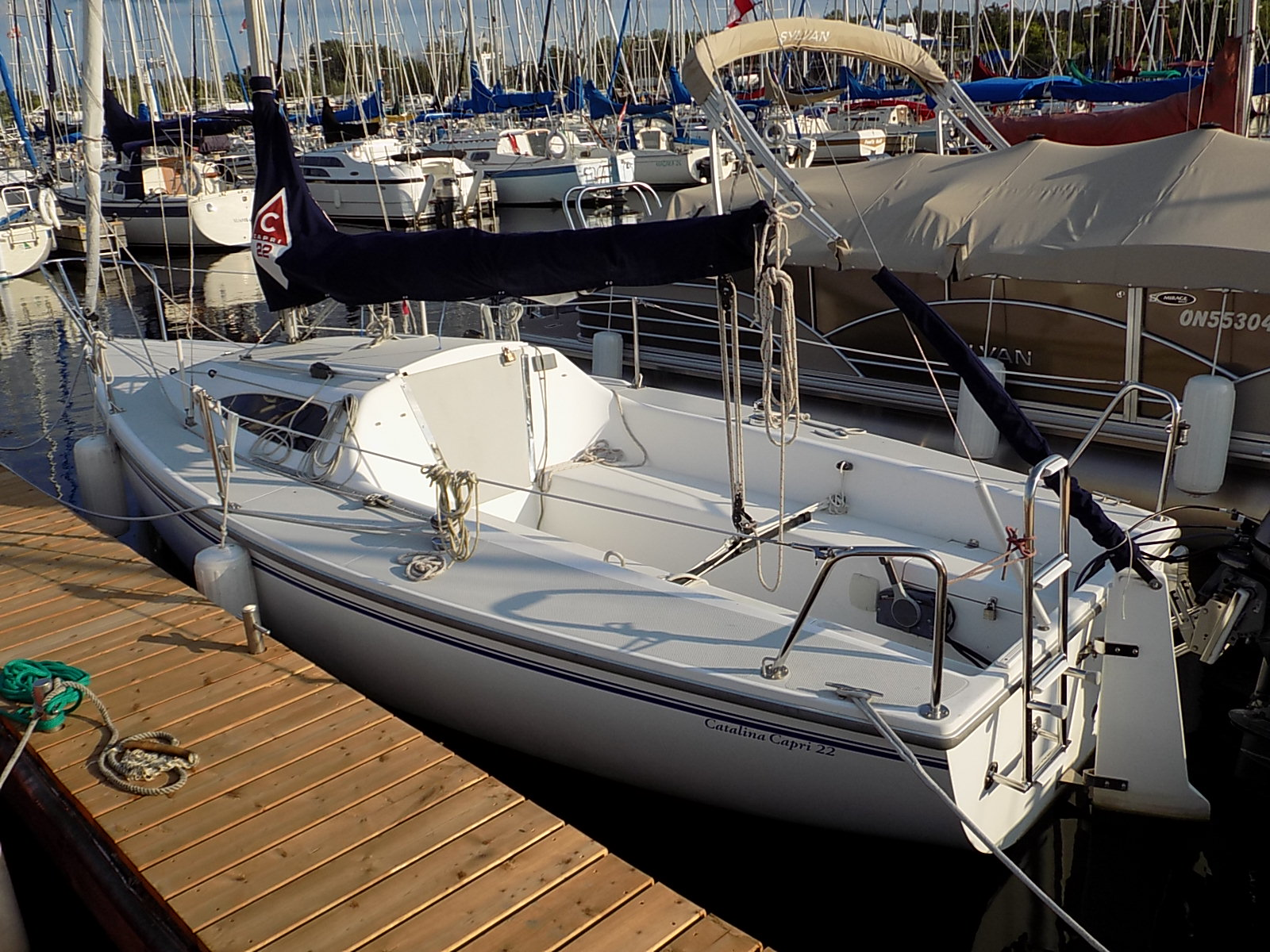
Capri 22

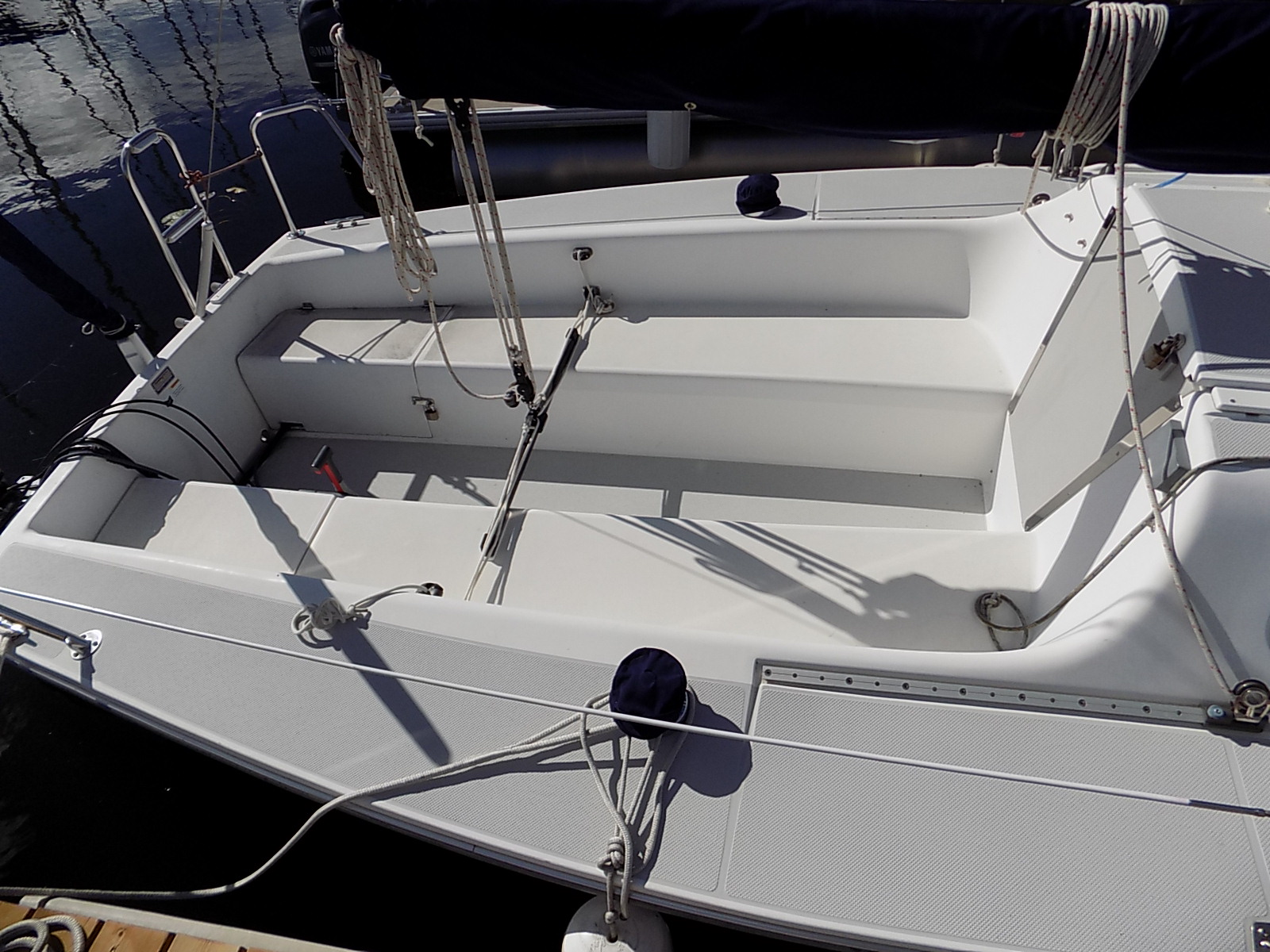
Capri 22 cockpit

The Capri 22 is a small recreational keelboat, built predominantly of fiberglass, with wood trim. It has a fractional sloop rig, a transom hung rudder and a conventional fin keel, shoal-draft keel or winged keel.

It displaces 2,200 lb (998 kg), a PHRF racing average handicap of 201 and has a hull speed of 5.99 kn (11.09 km/h).

The design has sleeping accommodation for four people, with a double "V"-berth in the bow cabin and two straight settees in the main cabin. An ice box is located under the companionway ladder. The head is a portable type, located under the bow cabin berth. Cabin headroom is 45 in (110 cm).

== Variants ==
Capri 22
Version with a conventional fin keel with 650 lb (295 kg) of ballast, giving a draft of 4.00 ft (1.22 m) or a shoal-draft keel with a draft of 2.50 ft (0.76 m). The shoal-draft version has a modified rudder.
Capri 22 WK
Version with a winged keel with 700 lb (318 kg) of ballast, giving a draft of 2.50 ft (0.76 m).
Capri 22 TR
Version with a tall rig, 2.00 ft (0.61 m) taller than the conventional version.

== Operational history ==
In a 2010 review Steve Henkel wrote, "the Capri 22 was designed to be a light, fast family boat with an emphasis on daysailing and fleet local racing. One main parameter in conceiving the Capri line was to produce a very well-finished boat for a reasonable price. One result is that both hull and deck have neat and easy-to-clean fiberglass liners. Another result is that when the boat first came off the line in 1985, the base price was a mere $6,000 ... Best features: Her PHRF of 201 puts her in the "fast" category ... Active fleets in most parts of the United States can make life more fun and interesting for owners who seek camaraderie. Worst features: Accommodations are very basic, and headroom is low ...."

== See also ==
- List of sailing boat types
