= Wilderness Boat Works =

American boat manufacturing company

Wilderness Boat Works (also known as Wilderness Yachts) was an American boat manufacturing company in Santa Cruz, California producing hand laid fiberglass monohull masthead sloops. They produced three boat designs, the 21 foot, 30 foot, and 40 foot Wilderness.

Run by Lynn Daugherty and John Josephs, the shop opened in the 1970s, first producing the Wilderness 21. Wilderness Boat Works closed their doors in the late 1980s. Their facilities were located at 2473 Mission Street in Santa Cruz

== Boat Designs ==
=== Wilderness 21 ===
The Wilderness 21 (W21) was manufactured as a one piece hand laminated fiberglass hull, that was offered in 16 colors, with a one piece, balsa core, sandwich laminated deck, interior teak floors and [[African brunzeel mahogany]] bulkhead. Wilderness Boat Works first made the Wilderness 21 in 1978.

The Wilderness 21, later remanufactured as the Burns 21, was designed by Chuck Burns and first produced by shipbuilder Lynn Daugherty and John Josephs of Wilderness Boat Works of Santa Cruz, in California. There were about eighty made. The W21 was billed as a lightweight boat with a fine entry and high prismatic coefficient for speed and easy surfing in swell.

Burns recalls "2 W-21s sailed in the single-handed race from San Francisco to Kauai and the most notorious W-21 was Little Rascal sailed by Amy Boyer to victory in the women's division of the Mini-Transat race from Penzance England to Tenerife (Canary Islands) and thence to Antigua, West Indies."

In 1978, various Wilderness won races, including:

- 1st overall in the L.A. Midwinters
- 1st overall in the Huston Y.C. Series
- 2nd overall, 1st in class with the Galvaston Bay Cruising Association
- 1st overall in the Southern California Yachting Association (PHRF)
- 1st overall in the Trans Tahoe California

The Wilderness 21 was produced into 1987.

==== Boat Specs ====
- LOA: 20'6"
- DWL: 17'9"
- BEAM: 7'3"
- Draft: 4'
- Displacement: 1870 LBS.
- Ballast: 1070 LBS.
- Displacement Ratio 56%
- Sail Area: 208 SQ. FT.
- I: 25
- J: 8.70
- P: 25.00
- E: 8.00
- WL: 17.75
- CBDR: N/A
- PROP: OB/N/A

=== Wilderness 30 ===
The Wilderness 30' was designed by Chuck Burns and first manufactured in 1979. The 30 had several sail-plan configurations, the 30, 30 IB, 30 SX, and 30 SX FR.

==== Boat Specs ====
===== Wilderness 30 =====
- Hull Type: Fin w/ Spade Rudder
- LOA: 30.00' (9.14m)
- LWL: 27.75' (8.46m)
- Beam: 8.80' (2.68m)
- Draft (max): 5.50' (1.68m)
- Displacement: 5500 lbs (2495 kg)
- Sail Area: 472 sq. ft (43.85 sq. m)
- I: 39.0' (11.89m)
- J: 14.10' (4.30m)
- P: 34.30' (10.45m)
- E: 11.50' (3.51m)

===== Wilderness 30 IB =====
- I: 39'
- J: 14.1'
- P: 34.2'
- E: 11.5'

===== Wilderness 30 SX =====
- I: 34.1'
- J: 11.8'
- P: 34.3'
- E: 11.5'

===== Wilderness 30 SX FR =====
- I: 34.1'
- J: 11.8'
- P: 34.3'
- E: 11.5'

=== Wilderness 40 ===
The Wilderness 40' was designed by Gary Mull and first Produced in 1980 and was the only boat manufactured by Wilderness Boat Works to include an onboard engine, originally a Yanmar diesel.

==== Boat Specs ====
- Hull Type: Fin w/ Spade Rudder
- LOA: 38.4'
- LWL: 32.0' (9.75m)
- Beam: 12.0' (3.66m)
- Draft (max): 6.50' (1.98m)
- Displacement: 9000 lbs (4082 kg)
- Sail Area: 597 sq. ft. (55.46 sq.m)
- Ballast: 3969 lbs (1800 kg), Lead
- I: 47.' (14.33m)
- J: 15.0' (4.57m)
- P: 41.5' (12.65m)
- E: 11.8' (3.6m)
