= Sonata 8 =

1979 Australian recreational keelboat

Development
- Designer: Gary Mull
- Location: United States
- Year: 1979
- Builder: Investigator Yachts
- Name: Sonata 8

Boat
- Displacement: 2,822 lb (1,280 kg)
- Draft: 5.09 ft (1.55 m)

Hull
- Type: Monohull
- Construction: Fiberglass
- LOA: 26.25 ft (8.00 m)
- LWL: 19.75 ft (6.02 m)
- Beam: 8.20 ft (2.50 m)

Hull appendages
- Keel: lifting keel
- Ballast: 500 lb (227 kg)
- Rudder: transom-mounted rudder

Rig
- General: Fractional rigged sloop
- I foretriangle height: 25.75 ft (7.85 m)
- J foretriangle base: 9.00 ft (2.74 m)
- P mainsail luff: 28.00 ft (8.53 m)
- E mainsail foot: 11.48 ft (3.50 m)

Sails
- Mainsail area: 160.72 sq ft (14.931 m^{2})
- Jib/genoa area: 115.88 sq ft (10.766 m^{2})
- Total sail area: 276.60 sq ft (25.697 m^{2})

The Sonata 8 is a recreational keelboat that was designed by Gary Mull and first built in 1979. It was built by Investigator Yachts in Australia starting in 1979, but the design is out of production. It was raced in Australia as a one-design class.

The Sonata 8 design was developed into the Sonata 26 in 1980 and produced by the same manufacturer. The two boats share the same specifications.

== Design ==
The Sonata 8 is built predominantly of fiberglass, with wood trim. It has a fractional sloop rig, a transom-hung rudder and a lifting or optionally fixed fin keel. It displaces 2,822 lb (1,280 kg) and carries 500 lb (227 kg) of ballast.

The boat has a draft of 5.09 ft (1.55 m) with the keel down and 0.69 ft (0.21 m) with the keel retracted. The fixed keel version has a draft of 5.2 ft (1.6 m).

The design has a hull speed of 5.96 kn (11.04 km/h).
