= Buccaneer (video game) =

1997 video game

- Developer: Divide by Zero Software
- Publisher: Strategic Simulations
- Platform: Windows
- Release: 1997
- Genres: Action game, Strategy game
- Modes: Single-player, multiplayer

Buccaneer is a 1997 action/strategy video game from Strategic Simulations. The player commands a pirate ship in the Caribbean during the 17th century.

== Gameplay ==
In Buccaneer, players assume command of a pirate ship navigating the Caribbean during the 17th century. The game offers both single ship-to-ship battles and campaign modes. Multiplayer options include TCP/IP, modem, and serial link support. In campaigns, players follow loosely structured quests involving missing loved ones or treasure hunts, culminating in battles against fortified towns. These ship-to-fort duels are intense, with enemy forts wielding superior firepower, forcing players to rely on relentless cannon fire. Gameplay includes light resource management: maintaining supplies, repairing ships, and recruiting crew. Graphically, Buccaneer includes 3D modeling, dynamic damage effects, and atmospheric touches like fog and ship heeling. The gun-port view allows players to target specific parts of enemy vessels.

== Development ==
The game was developed by Divide By Zero, a company founded in 1995.

== Reception ==
Reception

Review scores
Publication	Score
Computer Gaming World	1.5/5
GameSpot	4.5/10
Gamezilla	80%
Power Play	80%

GameSpot gave the game a score of 4.5 out of 10, stating, "If you long for a quality fighting sail game, you'll be better off loading up TalonSoft's Age of Sail, the lone bright light in a sea of mediocrity"

Dirk Lammers from The Tampa Tribune praised the 3-D graphics and battle sequences but criticized the missions plots which he thought were too shallow.
