= Hunter Medina 20 =

Sailboat class

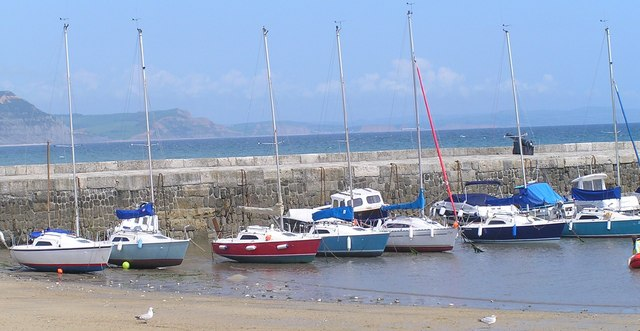

Boat
- Crew: 4
- Draft: 0.25 m / 1.17 m

Hull
- Hull weight: 860 kg
- LOA: 6 m (20 ft)
- LWL: 5.38m
- Beam: 2.21 m (7 ft 3 in)

Sails
- Mainsail area: 10.20 m^{2}
- Jib/genoa area: 7.85 m^{2}

The Hunter Medina 20 was designed by David Thomas for British Hunter boats in 1979 as a fast lifting keel trailer-sailer, based on the designs of the highly successful Hunter Sonata. It had a single cabin with four berths and a galley.

It proved itself to be a practical and well built small cruiser-racer, with a light 860 kg displacement, fast hull. Her draft is 3' 6" with the keel down and 10" with the keel raised. The keel is made of cast iron and lifts straight up and down on a winch. It weighs 220 kilos.

The type has ceased production, but the high build quality and demand has ensured that most are still afloat, so the Medina is still an active class.

A total of 165 Medinas were produced.

Its equivalent in the current Hunter line is the H20 Fox.

== Sailing qualities ==
The hull and large sail-plan give the Medina speed comparable to many 25-footers. However, when overpressed with too much sail, the boat will have a tendency to gripe (luff up without tiller input) or even broach.

== Interior ==
The interior has a V-berth and heads at the front, a galley to starboard, keel box and lifting gear in the centre and two quarterberths.

The small galley area has a sink and often a single burner Origo meths stove.

== Trailer ==
The trailer system marketed for the Medina incorporated a four-wheeled trolley on top of a single-axle trailer, which allowed the boat to be launched without immersing the main trailer. It was intended that each owner would have a trolley for launching and laying-up, but that the trailer would be shared between a group to reduce costs. In reality, most Medina owners either own both a trailer and trolley or a standard boat trailer.

Would appreciate if somebody could add the weight of the trailer and trolly.

== See also ==
- List of sailboat designers and manufacturers
