= Blackburn Buccaneers =

Blackburn Buccaneers Ice Hockey Club
- City: Blackburn, England
- League: N/A, EIHA Rec
- Founded: 2007
- Home arena: Blackburn Ice Arena (capacity: 3,200)
- Colors: Black Gold
- General manager: (England) Chris Beesley
- Head coach: (England) TBC
- Captain: (England) Michael Walsh

The Blackburn Buccaneers are a recreational ice hockey team who play their home games from Blackburn Ice Arena.

Registered with the EIHA, they play non-checking ice hockey. The team is made up of players from complete beginners to experienced players.

The club is run by an elected committee.

== Current committee ==
Name	Position
Chris Beesley	General Manager
Chris Beesley	Treasurer
Michael Walsh	Committee Member

The committee handles all the club's off-ice management and affairs.

== Recent history ==
Early Years

Whilst 2011 marked a turnaround for the structure and management of the club, it was a relatively unproductive year on the ice as the club only managed to put two wins on the board. Both victories came against the North East Nomads, 9–3 at Blackburn and 15–4 at Dumfries Ice Bowl.

2012 started where 2011 ended with an 18–5 loss to the Tyneside Jesters at Whitley Bay Ice Rink. Wins against the Jesters in the return leg at Blackburn, Nottingham Phantoms, Coventry HoneyBadgers, Manchester Metros 'C', Birmingham Rockets, Altrincham SilverBlades and a draw against Wyre Seagulls saw the club go on their best run of games in their five-year history.

2019/20 Season

In June 2019 the Buccaneers lifted their first piece of silverware when they won the first annual Bone Idle Tournament held at Bradford Ice Arena. The tournament consisted of 6 teams (Bradford Ice Wolves, Leeds Gryphons, Coventry Centurions, Trafford Thunder, Sheffield Mavericks and Blackburn Buccaneers). All 6 teams played each other in a round-robin format with the top 2 teams playing for the trophy and the 3rd/4th teams playing in a 3rd place playoff. The Buccaneers won all but one of their round-robin games leaving them at the top of the leaderboard. They were defeated only by Sheffield Mavericks in the final round-robin fixture which allowed the Mavericks to end in 4th place and compete in the 3rd place playoff where they were eventually defeated by Bradford Ice Wolves. The Buccaneers won the final 3–1 against 2nd place Trafford Thunder. Having gone a goal down in the first period 2 goals from Michael Walsh put the Buccaneers ahead in what was a very tight contest. With less than two minutes remaining in the game Simon Pickering scored a wrist shot straight from a face off to secure the result, leading to the Buccaneers lifting the trophy.

2021/22 Season

The Buccaneers returned to competitive action following Covid in July 2021 against the Sheffield Ice Tigers in the War of the Rose Cup. In a two legged format, the Blackburn Buccaneers secured a 9–1 win at the Blackburn Arena on 17 July. Sam Calderbank stealing the show with four goals for Blackburn. On 31 July the Buccaneers travelled to Ice Sheffield triumphing in a far more competitive encounter, 12-5, securing the cup for Lancashire.

The Buccaneers also participated in the Ice Hockey Summer Classic 2021-22. The league included Wyre Seagulls, Altrincham Jets, Halton Huskies, Earle Road Elks. In a busy schedule the Buccs finished with 5 wins and 5 losses, securing a win against each team barring ultimate league and playoff winners Altrincham Jets.

2024/25 Season

After securing the regular season division winners trophy, the Buccaneers travelled to Ice Sheffield full of optimism for their play-off semi-final clash with Kingston Fat Dads but it was not to be as the Hull club ran out 5-0 winners.

Despite periods of sustained pressure in the Kingston zone and a significant number of shots on goal, the Buccs could not get one over the line. Whilst 5-0 wasn’t an entire reflection of the game, it cannot be argued that Kingston were the deserved winners and they went on to defeat Leeds Lightning in the final.

Ironically, the winners of the respective divisions went on to meet in the 3rd/4th place play-off at 8am on Sunday morning where the Buccs faced Whitley Bay Islanders. After a shootout victory over the Islanders in the 2023/24 season semi-final, the game was expected to be a tight affair. In the end the Buccs cruised to an 11-1 victory to win the 3rd place trophy.

== Current squad ==
(based on active players)

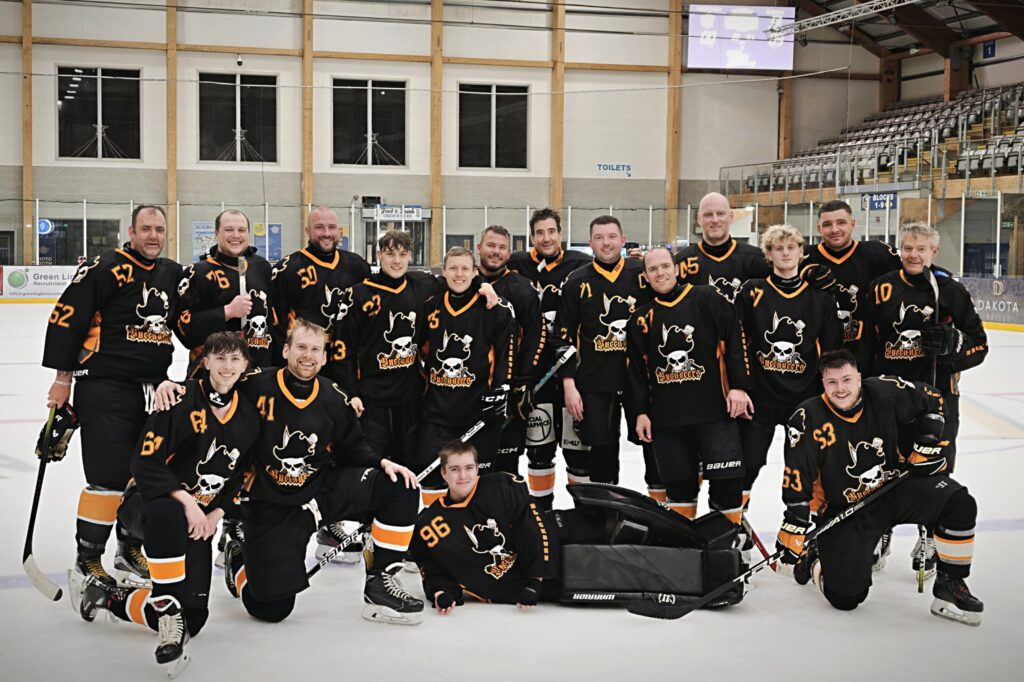
Blackburn Buccaneers 2025

Number	Name	Position	Country
96	James Harrison	G	(England)
83	Bailey Longworth	G	(England)
71	Michael Walsh	D (C)	(England)
41	Christopher Beesley	D	(England)
45	Paul Tierney	D (A)	(Republic of Ireland)
89	Tommy Smith	D	(England)
25	Luke Jiggins	D (A)	(England)
18	Matt Dixon	D	(England)
63	Adam Duxbury	D	(England)
2	Steve Procter	D	(England)
13	Gareth Fogarty	F	(England)
52	James Longworth	F	(England)
14	Sam Towse	F	(England)
16	Tom Helm	F	(England)
17	James Tierney	F	(England)
37	Patrick Thomson	F	(England)
21	Zak O'Boyle	F	(England)
29	Daniel Watson	F	(England)
36	Claire Smith	F	(England)
50	Paul Burns	F	(England)
64	Callum Rose	F	(England)
76	Jonathan Bowen	F	(England)
93	Noel Swinn	F	(England)
23	Hudson Nuttall	F	(England)
10	Jonathan Nuttall	F	(England)
9	Kieran Banlin	F	(England)

== History ==
The club was founded in 2007 by Darren Shaw, Pete Hird, Gary Buckman and Michael McLoughlin. They played their first game on 13 January 2008 against Sheffield Stix at Ice Sheffield, winning 5–1.
