= Sonata 6.7 =

1980s Australian recreational keelboat

Development
- Designer: Gary Mull
- Location: United States
- Year: 1986
- No. built: 40
- Builder: Sonata Yachts
- Name: Sonata 6.7

Boat
- Displacement: 2,544 lb (1,154 kg)
- Draft: 4.92 ft (1.50 m)

Hull
- Type: Monohull
- Construction: Fiberglass
- LOA: 21.98 ft (6.70 m)
- LWL: 19.36 ft (5.90 m)
- Beam: 8.20 ft (2.50 m)

Hull appendages
- Keel: fin keel
- Ballast: 952 lb (432 kg)
- Rudder: internally-mounted spade-type rudder

Rig
- General: Fractional rigged sloop
- I foretriangle height: 24.74 ft (7.54 m)
- J foretriangle base: 7.74 ft (2.36 m)
- P mainsail luff: 27.10 ft (8.26 m)
- E mainsail foot: 9.48 ft (2.89 m)

Sails
- Mainsail area: 128.45 sq ft (11.933 m^{2})
- Jib/genoa area: 95.74 sq ft (8.895 m^{2})
- Total sail area: 224.20 sq ft (20.829 m^{2})

The Sonata 6.7 is a recreational keelboat designed by Gary Mull and first built in 1986. The design is out of production.

== Production ==
The boat was built by Sonata Yachts in Australia, which completed 40 examples starting in 1986.

== Design ==
The Sonata 6.7 is built predominantly of fiberglass. It has a fractional sloop rig, an internally-mounted spade-type rudder and a fixed fin keel. It displaces 2,544 lb (1,154 kg) and carries 952 lb (432 kg) of ballast.

The boat has a draft of 4.92 ft (1.50 m) with the standard keel. There was a lifting keel version produced as well.

The design has a hull speed of 5.9 kn (10.9 km/h).
