= Sonata (given name) =

- Gender: Female
- Language: Lithuanian
- Name day: 19 August

Origin
- Region of origin: Lithuania

Sonata is a Lithuanian feminine given name. People bearing the name Sonata include:

- Sonata Milušauskaitė (born 1973), Lithuanian race walker
- Sonata Tamošaitytė (born 1987), Lithuanian track and field athlete
- Sonata Vanagaitė (born 1994), Lithuanian footballer
