= Wilderness 40 =

Sailboat class

Development
- Designer: Gary Mull
- Location: United States
- Year: 1980
- No. built: at least five
- Builder: Wilderness Yachts
- Name: Wilderness 40

Boat
- Displacement: 9,000 lb (4,082 kg)
- Draft: 6.50 ft (1.98 m)

Hull
- Type: Monohull
- Construction: Fiberglass
- LOA: 40.00 ft (12.19 m)
- LWL: 32.00 ft (9.75 m)
- Beam: 12.00 ft (3.66 m)
- Engine: Yanmar diesel engine

Hull appendages
- Keel: fin keel
- Ballast: 3,969 lb (1,800 kg)
- Rudder: internally-mounted spade-type rudder

Rig
- General: Masthead sloop
- I foretriangle height: 47.00 ft (14.33 m)
- J foretriangle base: 15.00 ft (4.57 m)
- P mainsail luff: 41.50 ft (12.65 m)
- E mainsail foot: 11.80 ft (3.60 m)

Sails
- Mainsail area: 244.85 sq ft (22.747 m^{2})
- Jib/genoa area: 352.50 sq ft (32.748 m^{2})
- Total sail area: 597.35 sq ft (55.496 m^{2})

Racing
- PHRF: 87 (average)

The Wilderness 40 is an American sailboat, that was designed by Gary Mull and first built in 1980.

The Wilderness 40 is a development of the 1979 Wilderness 38.

== Production ==
The boat was built by Wilderness Yachts in Santa Cruz, California, United States, who built at least five examples, although the design is now out of production.

== Design ==
The Wilderness 40 is a small recreational keelboat, built predominantly of fiberglass, with wood trim. It has a masthead sloop rig, an internally-mounted spade-type rudder and a fixed fin keel. It displaces 9,000 lb (4,082 kg) and carries 3,969 lb (1,800 kg) of lead ballast. The boat has a draft of 6.50 ft (1.98 m) with the standard keel.

The boat is fitted with a Japanese Yanmar diesel engine.

== Variants ==
Wilderness 40 serial numbers 1 to 4
Early serials with a length overall of 40.00 ft (12.19 m) and a waterline length of 32.00 ft (9.75 m). PHRF racing average handicap of 87 with a high of 87 and low of 87. It has a hull speed of 7.58 kn (14.04 km/h).
Wilderness 40 serial numbers 5 and on
Later serials with a length overall of 38.50 ft (11.73 m), a waterline length of 32.00 ft (9.75 m) and a 3 ft (0.91 m) taller rig. PHRF racing average handicap of 81. It has a hull speed of 7.58 kn (14.04 km/h)

== See also ==
- List of sailing boat types
