= Buccaneer (role-playing game) =

Tabletop role-playing game

Buccaneer is a tabletop role-playing game published by Adversary Games in 1979.

== Description ==
Buccaneer is a pirate system, with brief early rules for playing pirate characters in the 17th and 18th centuries. The rules cover character types, progression, blade, gun, and cannon combat, duels, boarding actions, and plunder.

== Publication history ==
Buccaneer was designed by Carl Smith, and published by Adversary Games in 1979 as a digest-sized 16-page book.
