= US Yachts US 22 =

American recreational keelboat

US 22
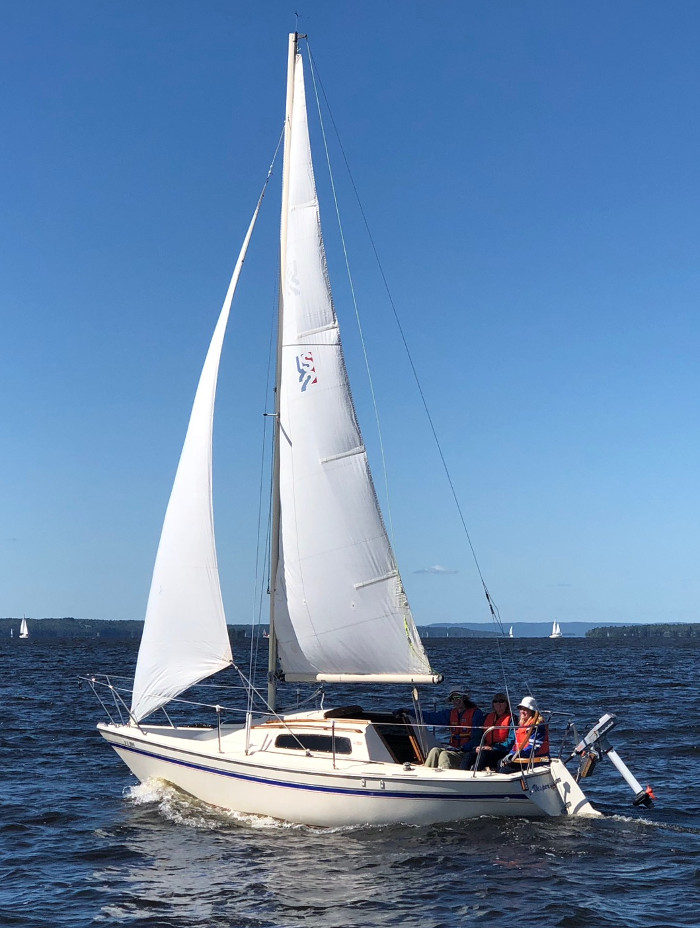

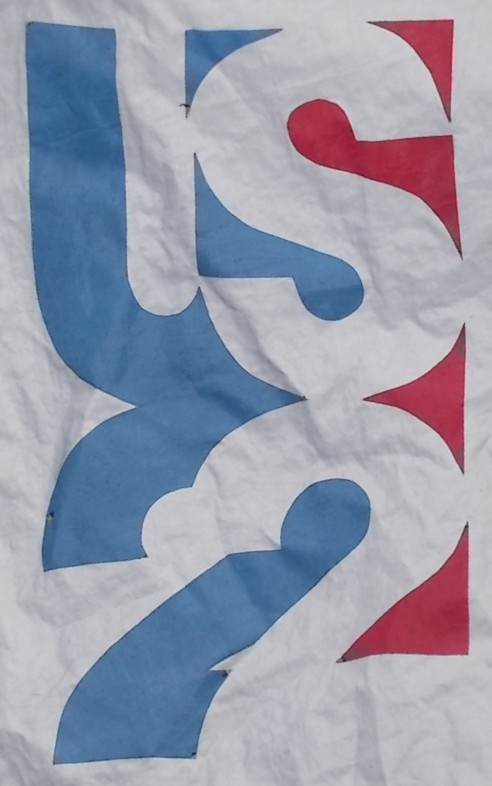

Development
- Designer: Gary Mull
- Location: United States
- Year: 1979
- Builder: US Yachts
- Name: US 22

Boat
- Crew: two
- Displacement: 2,450 lb (1,111 kg)
- Draft: 4.10 ft (1.25 m) with swing keel 2.67 ft (0.81 m) with shoal keel

Hull
- Construction: Fiberglass
- LOA: 22.00 ft (6.71 m)
- LWL: 19.92 ft (6.07 m)
- Beam: 7.92 ft (2.41 m)

Hull appendages
- Keel: fixed deep or shoal keel, optional swing keel
- Ballast: 950 lb (431 kg)
- Rudder: transom-mounted

Rig
- General: Fractional rigged sloop
- I foretriangle height: 24.80 ft (7.56 m)
- J foretriangle base: 8.70 ft (2.65 m)
- P mainsail luff: 25.00 ft (7.62 m)
- E mainsail foot: 7.50 ft (2.29 m)

Sails
- Mainsail area: 93.75 sq ft (8.710 m^{2})
- Jib/genoa area: 107.88 sq ft (10.022 m^{2})
- Total sail area: 202 sq ft (18.8 m^{2})

Racing
- PHRF: 282

The US Yachts US 22 is a recreational keelboat first built in 1979 by Bayliner and it is now out of production.

The US 22 design was later developed into the Triton 22 and built by Pearson Yachts starting in 1985.

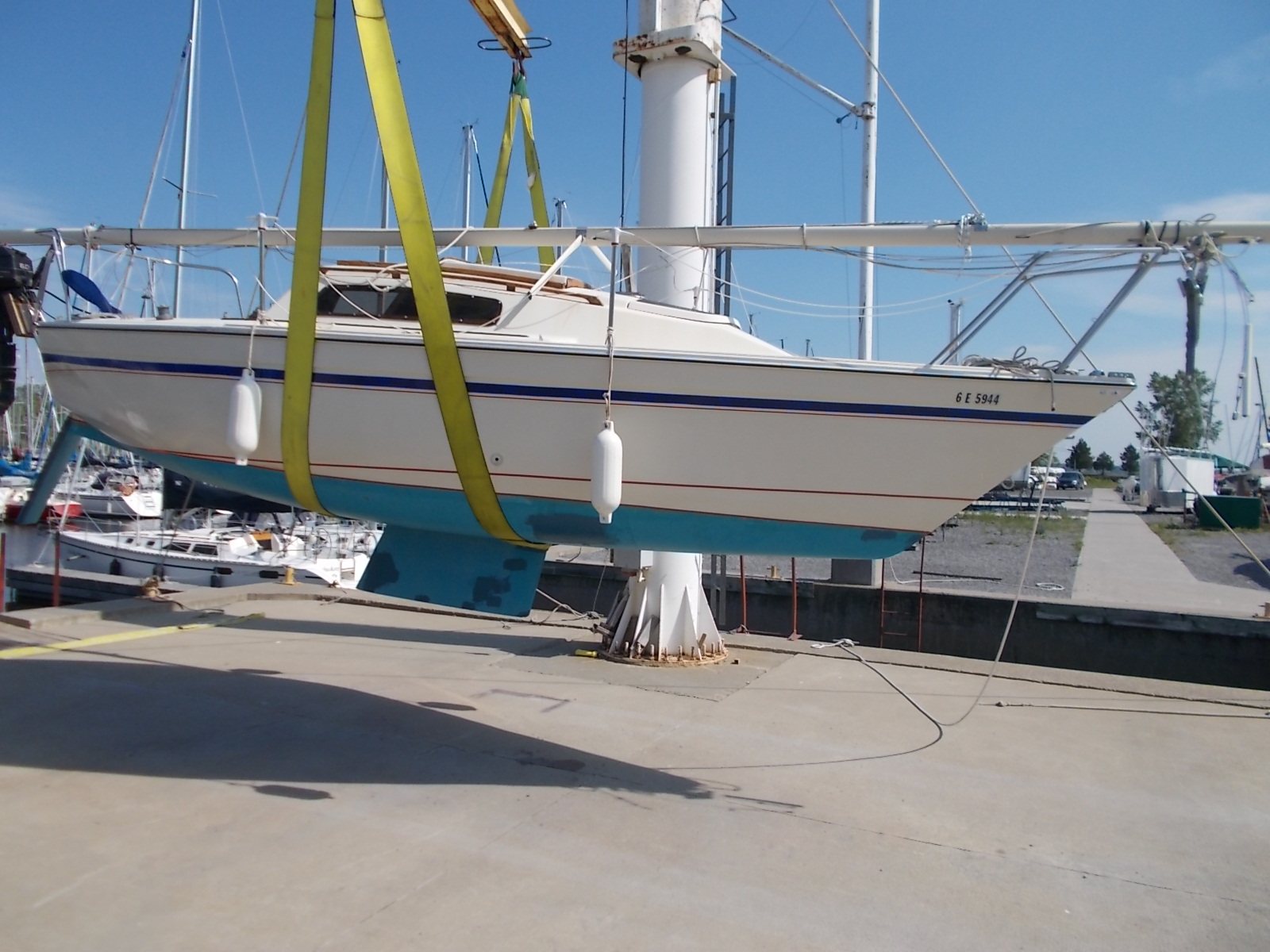
US 22 SD showing the shoal keel

Designed by Gary Mull, the fiberglass hull has a raked stem and reverse transom, and a transom-hung rudder controlled by a tiller. It has hull speed of 5.98 kn (11.07 km/h).

It has sleeping accommodation for five people, with a double "V"-berth in the bow, a drop-down dinette table on the port side that forms a double berth and a single quarter berth on the starboard side that extends under the cockpit. The galley is located on the starboard side just forward of the companionway steps. The galley is equipped with an optional two-burner alcohol-fired stove, a single sink with hand-pumped water supply and a portable icebox. The optional head is located in the bow cabin on the port side under the forward section of the "V" berth and consists of a portable toilet. The cabin sole is teak and holly. Ventilation is provided by a hatch over the bow cabin. Below decks headroom is 57 in (145 cm).

It has a fractional sloop rig with aluminum spars and has a mainsheet traveler mounted on the bridge deck, genoa tracks, an internally-mounted outhaul, topping lift and reefing system. There are two cockpit winches for the jib. The boat may be fitted with a spinnaker for downwind sailing.

== Variants ==
It was factory-built with three different types of fin keels: a conventional fixed keel, a fixed shoal-draft keel and a retractable swing keel. It has a draft of 4.10 ft (1.25 m) with the standard keel and 2.60 ft (0.79 m) with the optional shoal draft keel. The swing keel model has a draft of 5.75 ft (1.75 m) with the keel down and 2.42 ft (0.74 m) with it up.

US 22
This model was introduced in 1979 with a full fin keel and a draft of 4.10 ft (1.25 m). It has a PHRF racing average handicap of 282.
US 22 SD
This model was introduced in 1979 with a shoal draft keel and a draft of 2.60 ft (0.79 m). The boat has a PHRF racing average handicap of 264.
US 22 Swing Keel
This model was introduced in 1979 with a swing keel and a draft of 5.75 ft (1.75 m) with the keel down and 2.42 ft (0.74 m) with it retracted.

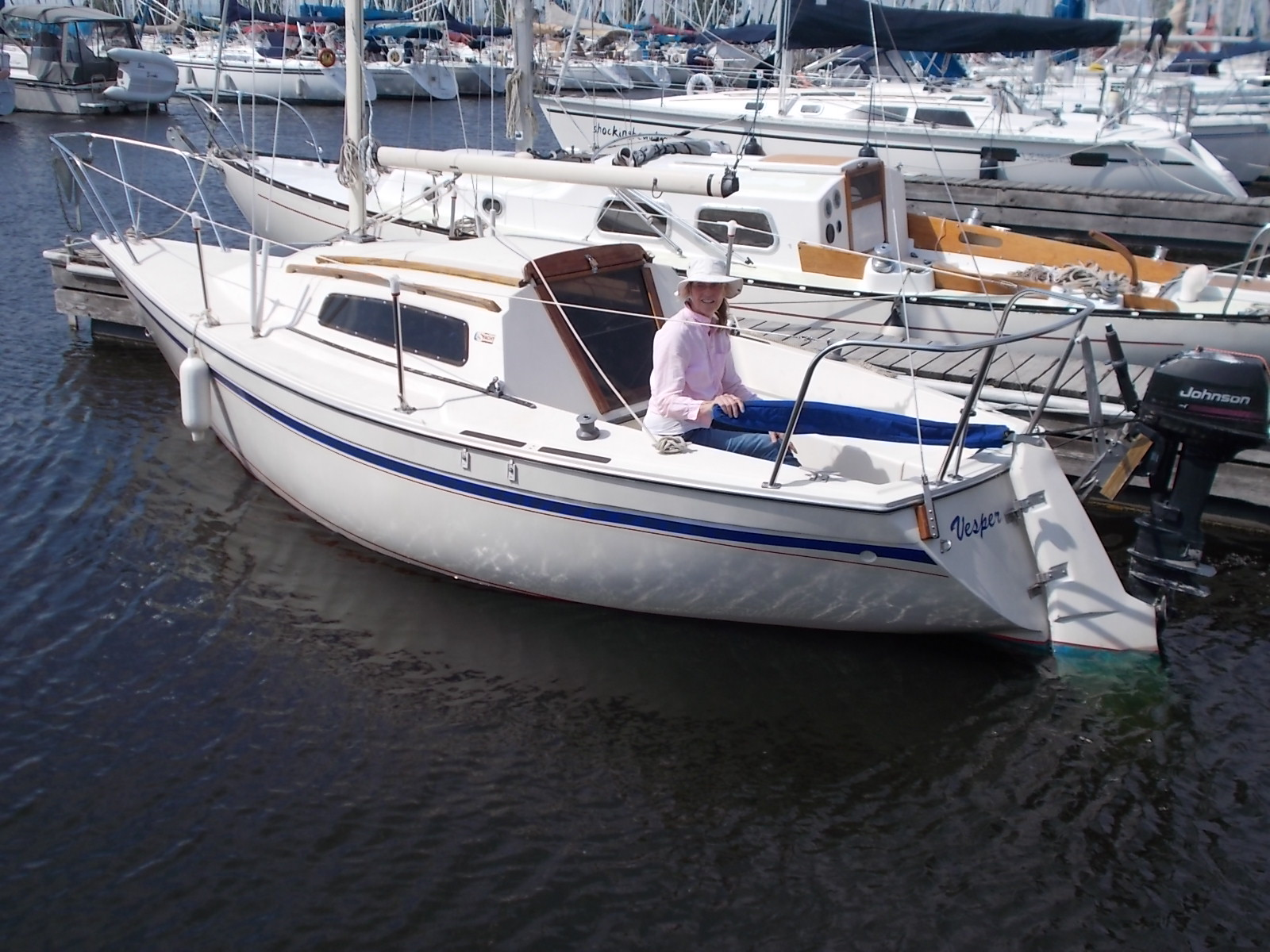
US 22 showing the reverse transom and transom-mounted rudder

== Reception ==
In a 2010 review Steve Henkel noted the wide four seat dinette table, which can be converted into a double berth. He listed the full keel version's worst features, in comparison to its competition, as, "the draft is a little high, the ballast a little low, and the headroom low, too."

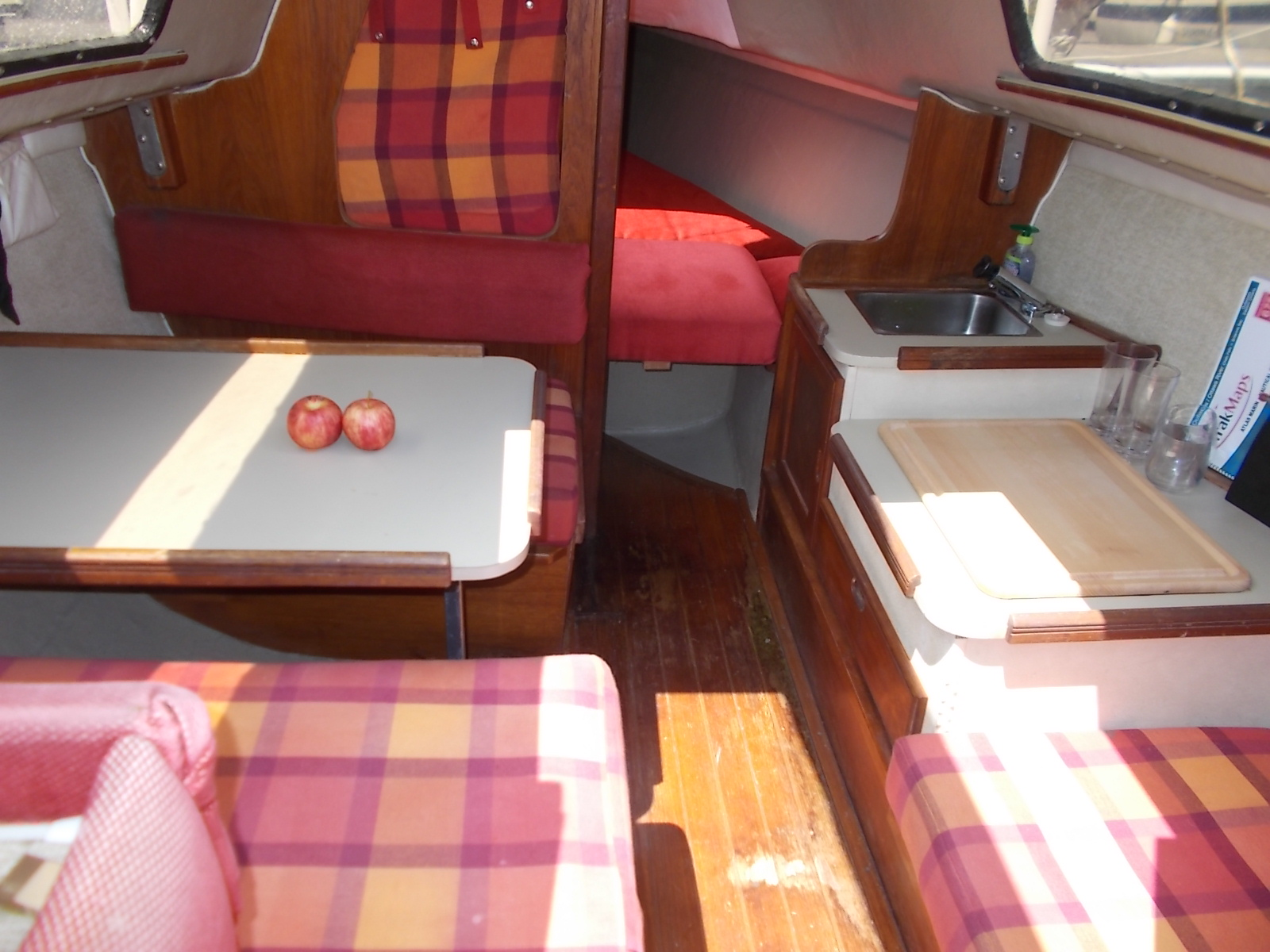
US 22 interior looking from the companionway steps towards the bow
