= Bayliner =

Manufacturer of recreational boats

Bayliner Boats
- Founded: 1957
- Founder: Orin Edson, Allen McKay
- Headquarters: Arlington, Washington, United States
- Products: Recreational boats
- Parent: Brunswick Boat Group
- Website: www.bayliner.com

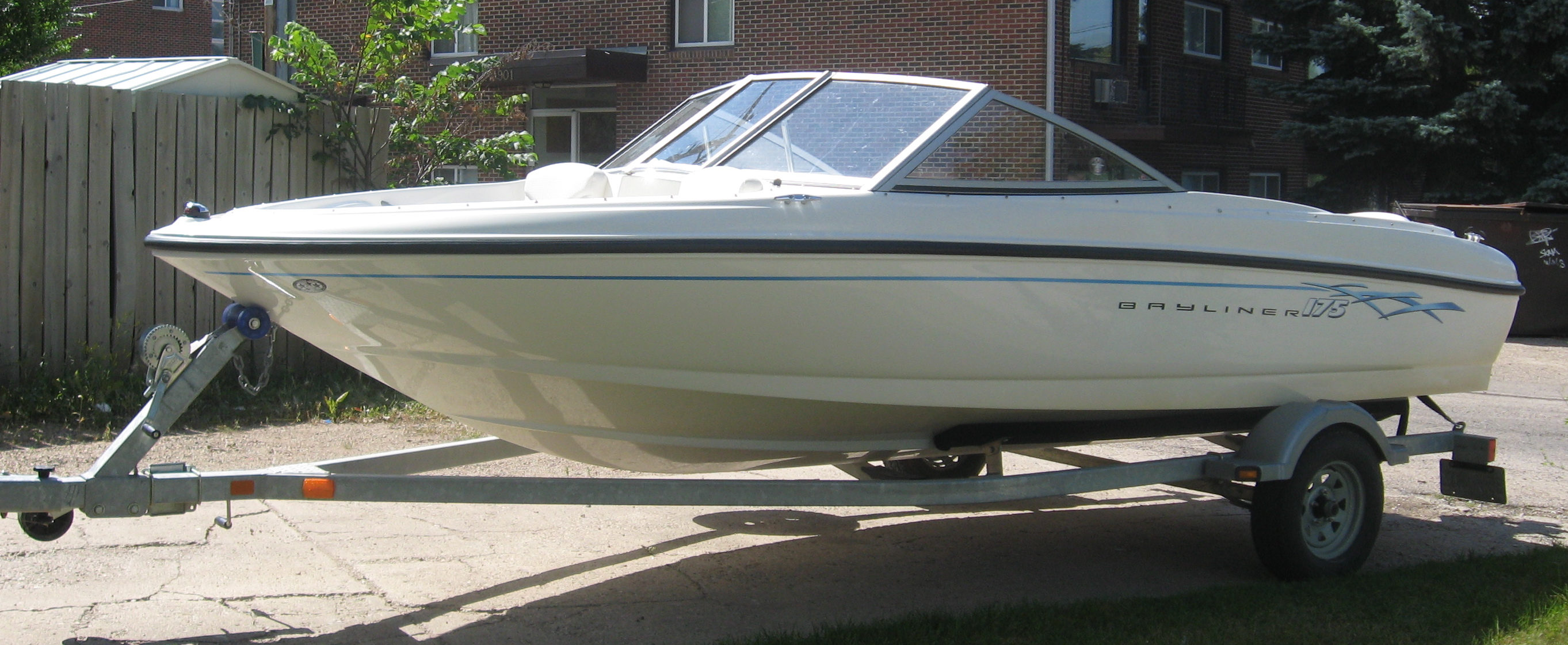
Trailered 175

Bayliner is a manufacturer of recreational boats. Established in 1957 by Orin Edson, Bayliner currently has over 400 dealers in over 60 countries around the world. The company operates as part of the Brunswick Boat Group, a division of the Brunswick Corporation. Bayliner was acquired by Brunswick from Orin Edson in 1986 for $425 million. Bayliner facilities are located in Knoxville, Tennessee, Dandridge, Tennessee and Arlington, Washington, in the United States and in Reynosa, Tamaulipas, in Mexico. Bayliner also has a plant in Portugal for the European market and in Brazil for the South American market. Bayliner offers deck boats, center console boats, and bowriders ranging from 16 to 26 feet only.

== Buccaneer Yachts and US Yachts ==
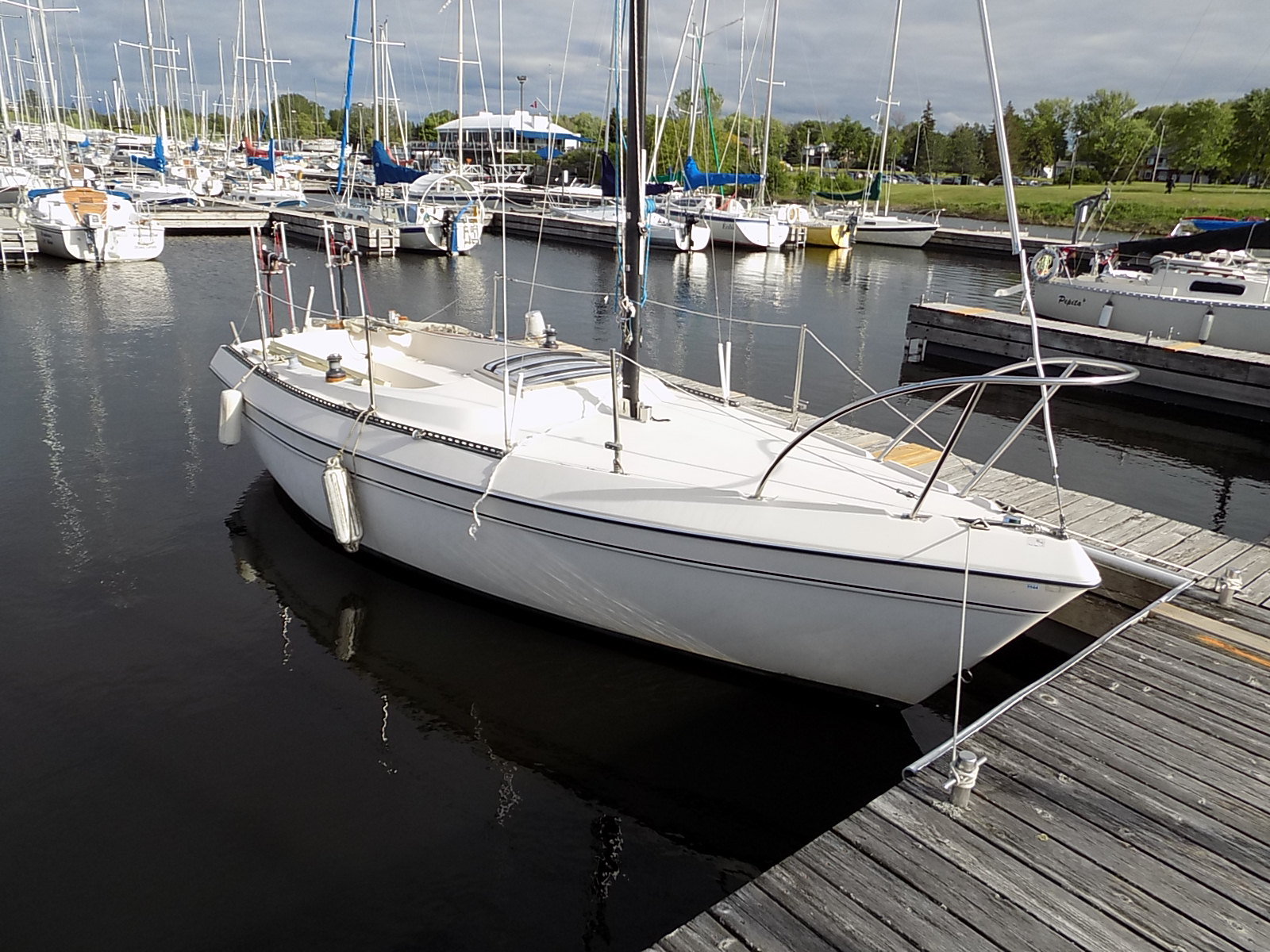
Buccaneer 200

Bayliner operated a sailboat division from 1970 until 1984. The Buccaneer Division of Bayliner produced sailboats under the brand names Buccaneer Yachts and United Sailing Yachts (US Yachts). The boats sold well though the 1973 oil crisis period, but the division was sold off to Pearson Yachts in 1984. Pearson continued producing the designs under the Triton name until that company went bankrupt in 1991.

The largest boat built was the US Yachts US 42. Other boats built include the Buccaneer 200, Buccaneer 220, US Yachts US 25 and the US 22. The boat designs tended to emphasize interior accommodation over sailing qualities.

== Bowriders ==
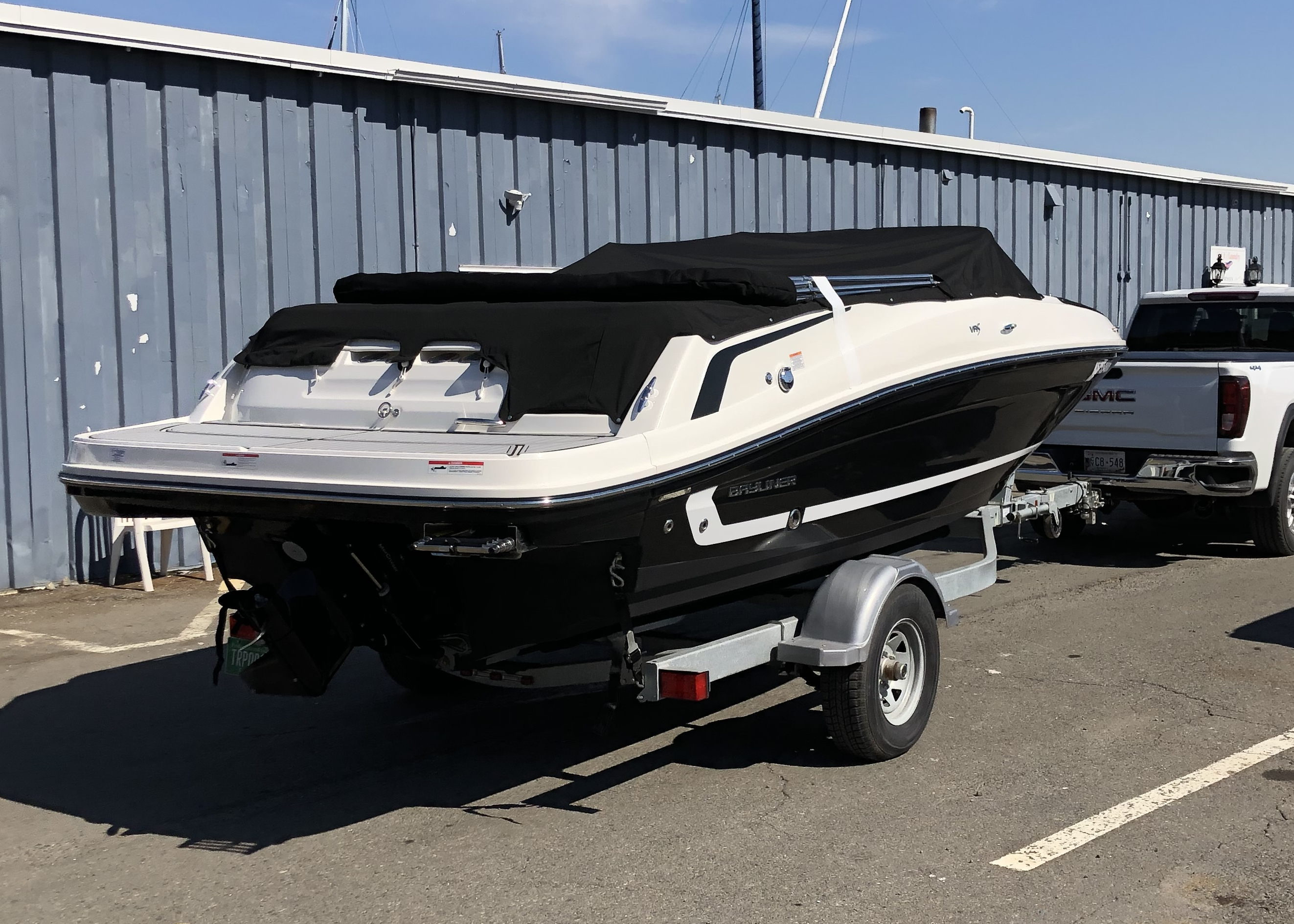
The Bayliner VR5 Bowrider measures 20'4", has a 4.5 L 200hp Mercury engine, and can seat up to 8 people.

Bayliner offers five different models of bow rider boats: The Bowrider 160, 170, VR4, VR5 and VR6. Each model increases in length and engine power, from 16 ft and 100 hp to 22 ft and 250 hp. Boats in the VR line can be configured with inboard or outboard engines.
