= Nonsuch 26 =

Sailboat class

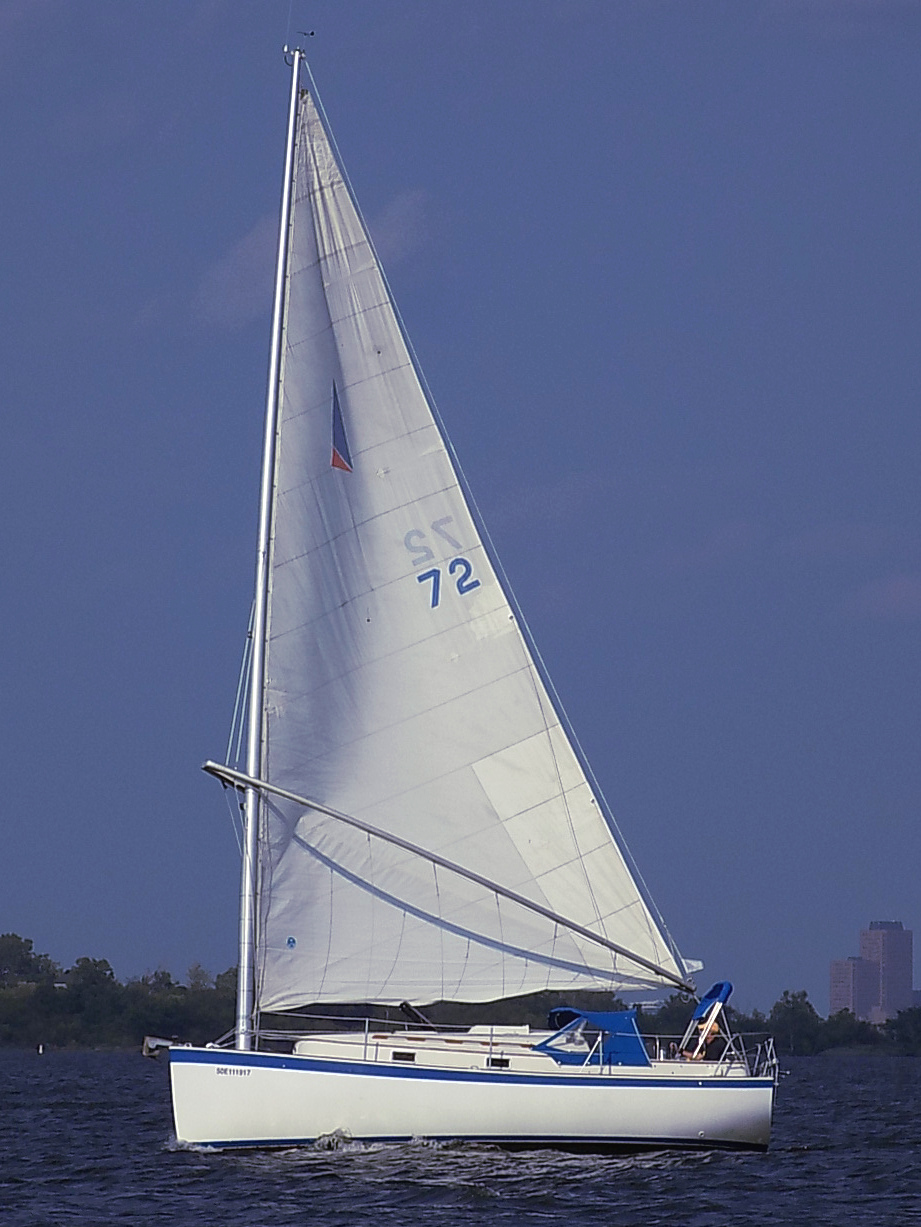

Development
- Designer: Mark Ellis
- Location: Canada
- Year: 1981
- Builder: Hinterhoeller Yachts
- Name: Nonsuch 26

Boat
- Displacement: 8,500 lb (3,856 kg)
- Draft: 4.50 ft (1.37 m)

Hull
- Type: Monohull
- Construction: Fiberglass
- LOA: 26.00 ft (7.92 m)
- LWL: 24.42 ft (7.44 m)
- Beam: 10.50 ft (3.20 m)
- Engine: Westerbeke 13 hp (10 kW) diesel engine

Hull appendages
- Keel: fin keel
- Ballast: 2,750 lb (1,247 kg)
- Rudder: internally-mounted spade-type rudder

Rig
- Rig type: Cat rigged
- P mainsail luff: 41.00 ft (12.50 m)
- E mainsail foot: 20.50 ft (6.25 m)

Sails
- Sailplan: Catboat
- Mainsail area: 420 sq ft (39 m^{2})
- Total sail area: 420 sq ft (39 m^{2})

Racing
- PHRF: 225 (average)

The Nonsuch 26 is a Canadian sailboat, that was designed by Mark Ellis and first built in 1981. It is one of the series of Nonsuch sailboats.

The Nonsuch 26 is a development of the larger, 1978-designed Nonsuch 30.

== Production ==
The Nonsuch 26 design was built by Hinterhoeller Yachts in St. Catharines, Ontario, Canada, between 1981 and 1988.

== Design ==
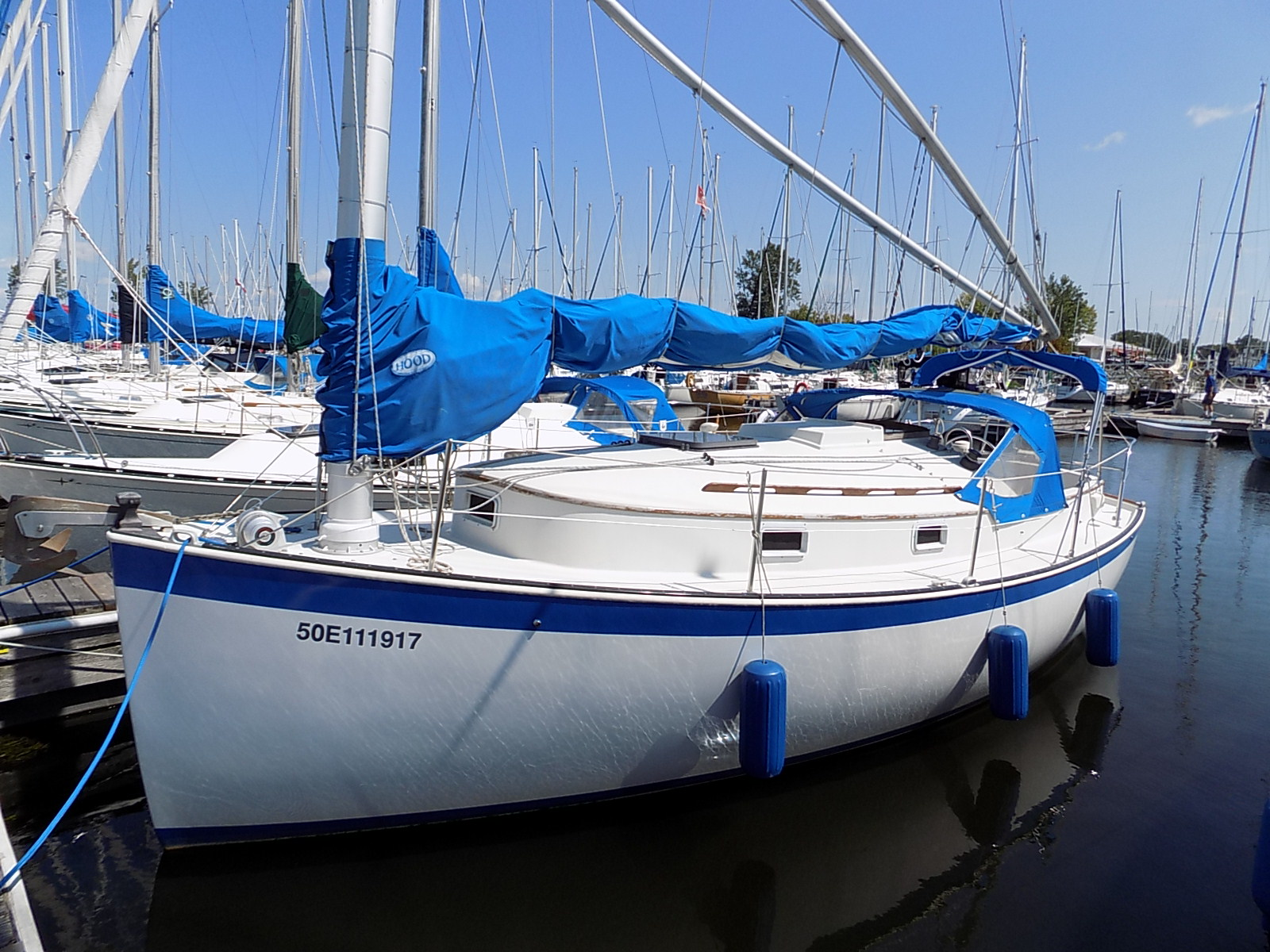
Nonsuch 26

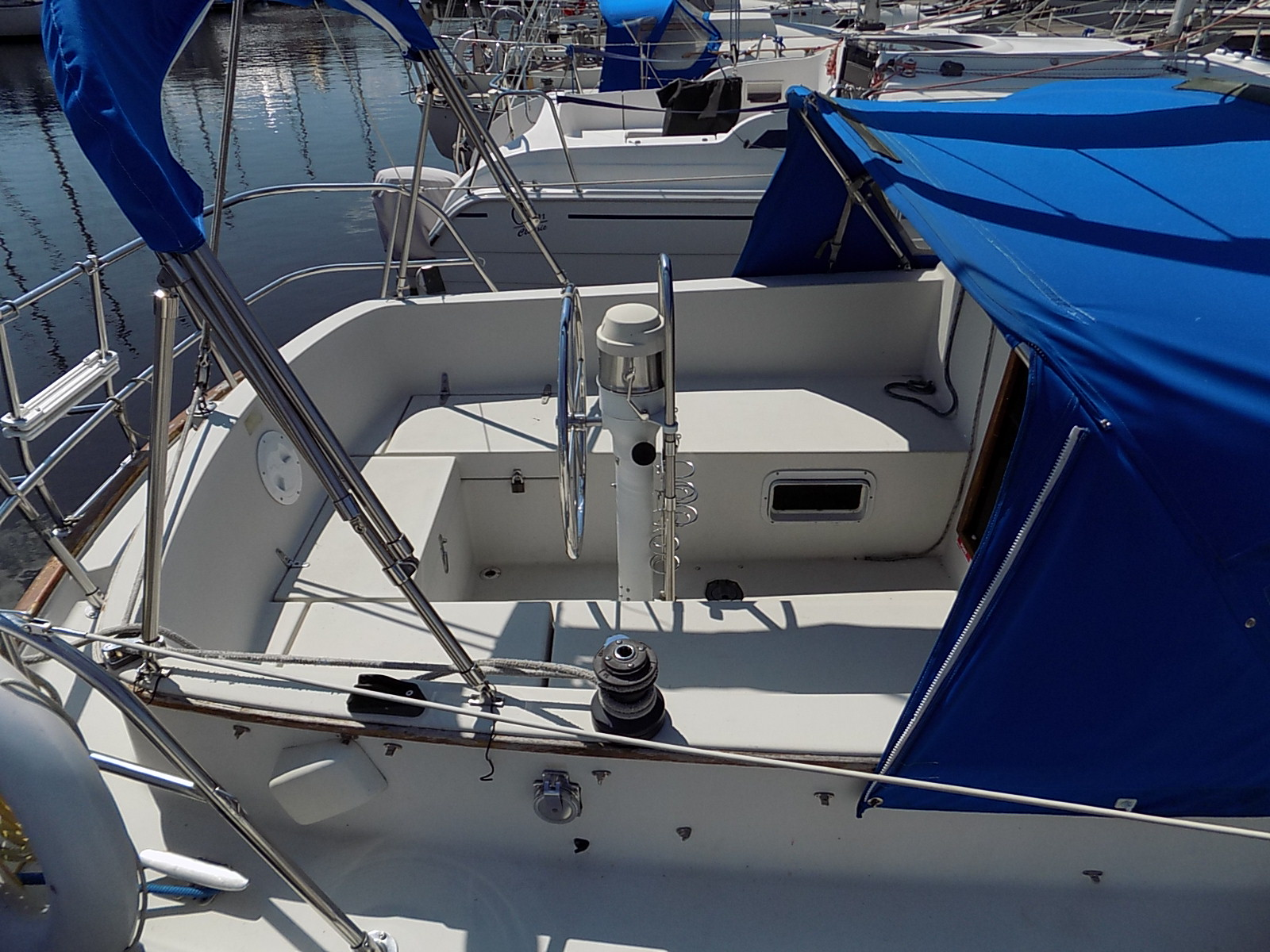
Nonsuch 26 cockpit

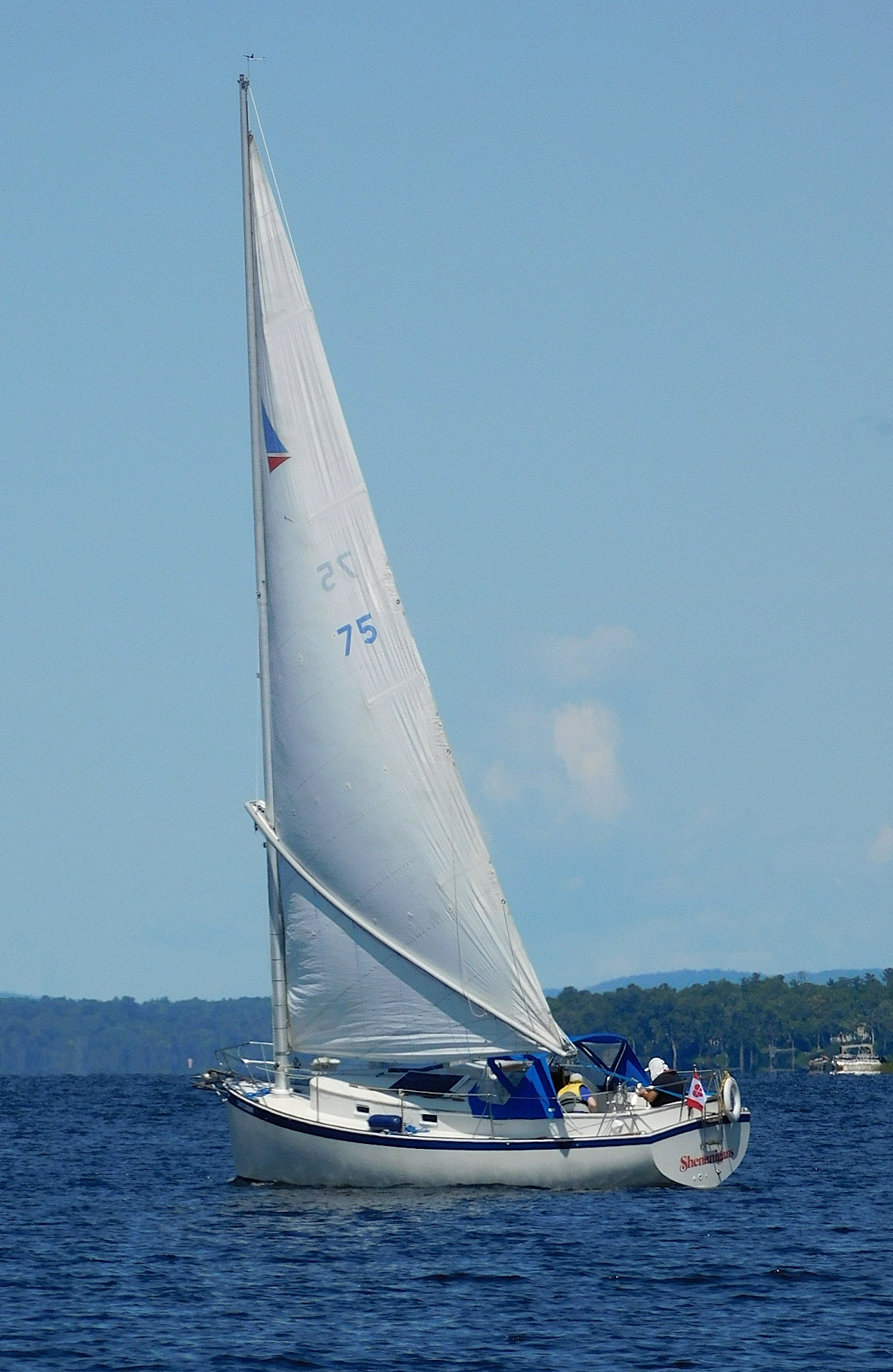
Nonsuch 26 showing the transom

The Nonsuch 26 is a recreational keelboat, built predominantly of fiberglass, with a balsa cored deck and wood trim. It has a cat rig, an unstayed mast with a wishbone boom, a plumb stem, a vertical transom, an internally-mounted spade-type rudder controlled by a wheel and a fixed fin keel. It displaces 8,500 lb (3,856 kg) and carries 2,750 lb (1,247 kg) of ballast.

The boat has a draft of 4.50 ft (1.37 m) with the standard keel fitted.

The boat is fitted with a Westerbeke 13 diesel engine of 13 hp (10 kW). The fuel tank holds 24 U.S. gallons (91 L; 20 imp gal) and the fresh water tank has a capacity of 60 U.S. gallons (230 L; 50 imp gal).

The design has sleeping accommodation for four people, with two straight settee berths in the main cabin and two aft cabins, each with a single berth. The galley is located on the port side just forward of the companionway ladder. The galley is L-shaped and is equipped with a two-burner stove, an ice box and a sink. The enclosed head is located opposite the galley on the starboard side.

The design has a PHRF racing average handicap of 225 with a high of 238 and low of 213. It has a hull speed of 6.62 kn (12.26 km/h).

== Operational history ==
In a review Michael McGoldrick wrote, "the Nonsuch 26 is much easier to sail short-handed than the average sailboat, and that it probably has as much interior room as many 30 footers".

== See also ==
- List of sailing boat types

Related development

- Nonsuch 22
