= Freedom 28 Cat Ketch =

Sailboat class

Development
- Designer: Gary Hoyt and Jay Paris
- Location: United States
- Year: 1979
- Builders: Freedom Yachts (Tillotson Pearson Inc)
- Name: Freedom 28 Cat Ketch

Boat
- Crew: two
- Displacement: 7,000 lb (3,200 kg)
- Draft: 5.33 ft (1.62 m), board down

Hull
- Construction: Fiberglass
- LOA: 28.33 ft (8.63 m)
- LWL: 25.75 ft (7.85 m)
- Beam: 9.33 ft (2.84 m)

Rig
- General: Cat ketch
- P mainsail luff: 12 ft (3.7 m)
- E mainsail foot: 30 ft (9.1 m)

Racing
- PHRF: 204 (average)

The Freedom 28 Cat Ketch is an American sailboat that was designed by Gary Hoyt and Jay Paris, first built in 1979. The design is out of production.

The boat is sometimes confused with the similarly-named Freedom 28.

== Production ==
The boat was built by Tillotson Pearson on behalf of Freedom Yachts in the United States, starting in 1979, but is now out of production.

== Design ==
The Freedom 28 Cat Ketch is a small recreational keelboat, built predominantly of fiberglass. It has an unstayed cat ketch rig, a transom-hung rudder and a swing-up centerboard. It displaces 7,000 lb (3,175 kg) and carries 3,800 lb (1,724 kg) of lead ballast.

The spars are made from carbon fiber. The initial models were produced with wrap-around sleeve-type sails and wishbone booms, but these were later changed to more conventional sails and booms.

The boat is fitted with a Japanese Yanmar 2GMF diesel engine of 15 hp (11 kW) and has a fuel tank with a capacity of 18 U.S. gallons (68 L; 15 imp gal). It also has a 30 U.S. gallons (110 L; 25 imp gal) water tank.

The boat has a PHRF racing average handicap of 204 with a high of 186 and low of 240. It has a hull speed of 6.8 kn (12.59 km/h).

== See also ==
- List of sailing boat types
