= Nonsuch 22 =

1980s Canadian recreational keelboat

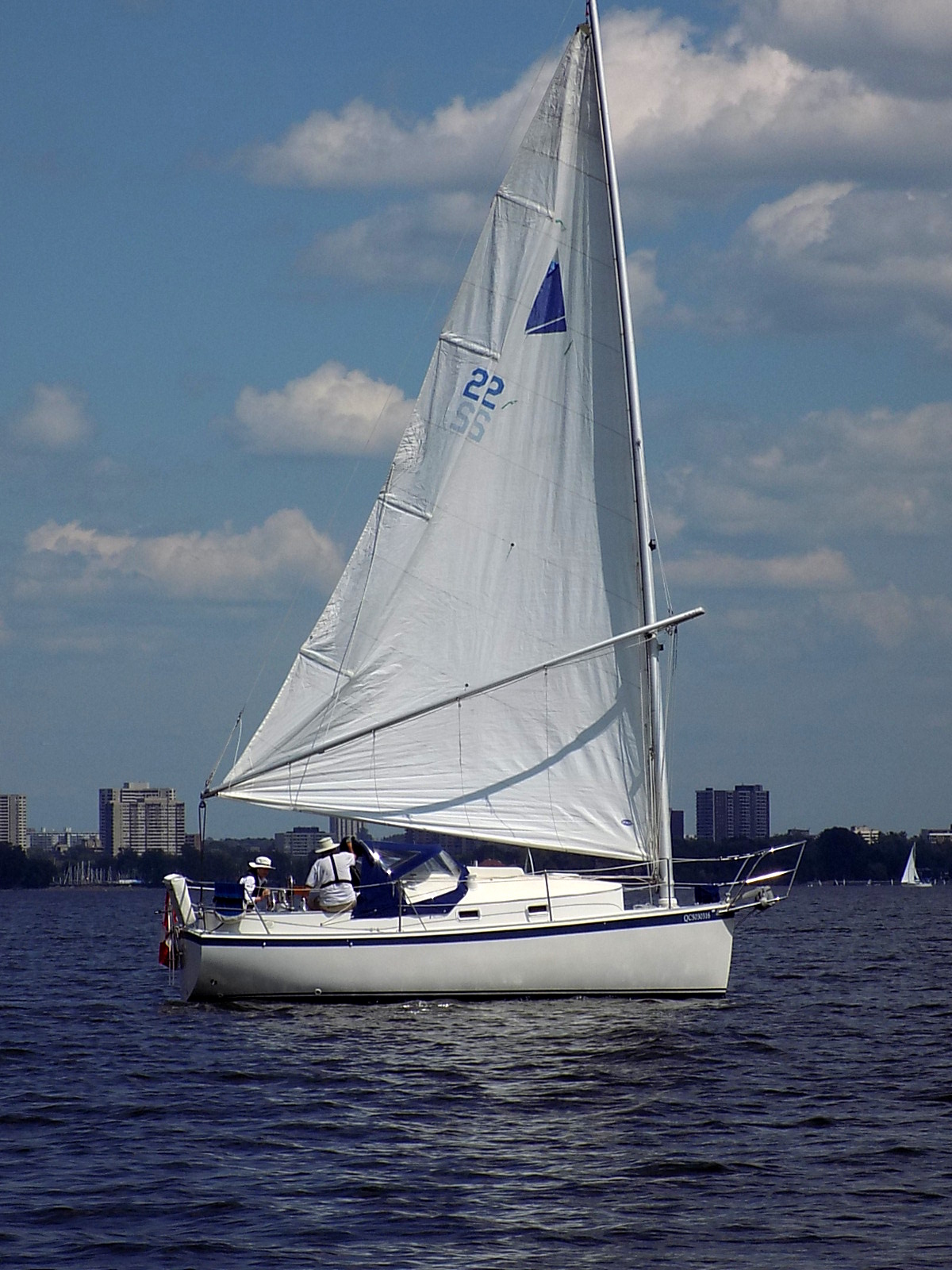

Development
- Designer: Mark Ellis Design
- Location: Canada
- Year: 1984
- No. built: 58
- Builder: Hinterhoeller Yachts

Boat
- Displacement: 5,000 lb (2,268 kg)
- Draft: 3.67 ft (1.12 m)

Hull
- Type: Monohull
- Construction: Fiberglass
- LOA: 22.00 ft (6.71 m)
- LWL: 20.50 ft (6.25 m)
- Beam: 8.50 ft (2.59 m)
- Engine: Westerbeke diesel engine

Hull appendages
- Keel: fin keel
- Ballast: 1,800 lb (816 kg)
- Rudder: internally-mounted spade-type rudder

Rig
- Rig type: Cat rigged

Sails
- Sailplan: Catboat
- Total sail area: 306 sq ft (28.4 m^{2})

Racing
- PHRF: 240 (average)

The Nonsuch 22 is a recreational keelboat, the smallest of the series of Nonsuch sailboats. It was designed by Mark Ellis Design and first built in 1984.

The design is a scaled-down development of the original, larger Nonsuch 30.

== Production ==
The design was built by Hinterhoeller Yachts in St. Catharines, Ontario, Canada starting in 1984. It went out of production in about 1990. A total of 58 examples were built before production ended.

== Design ==
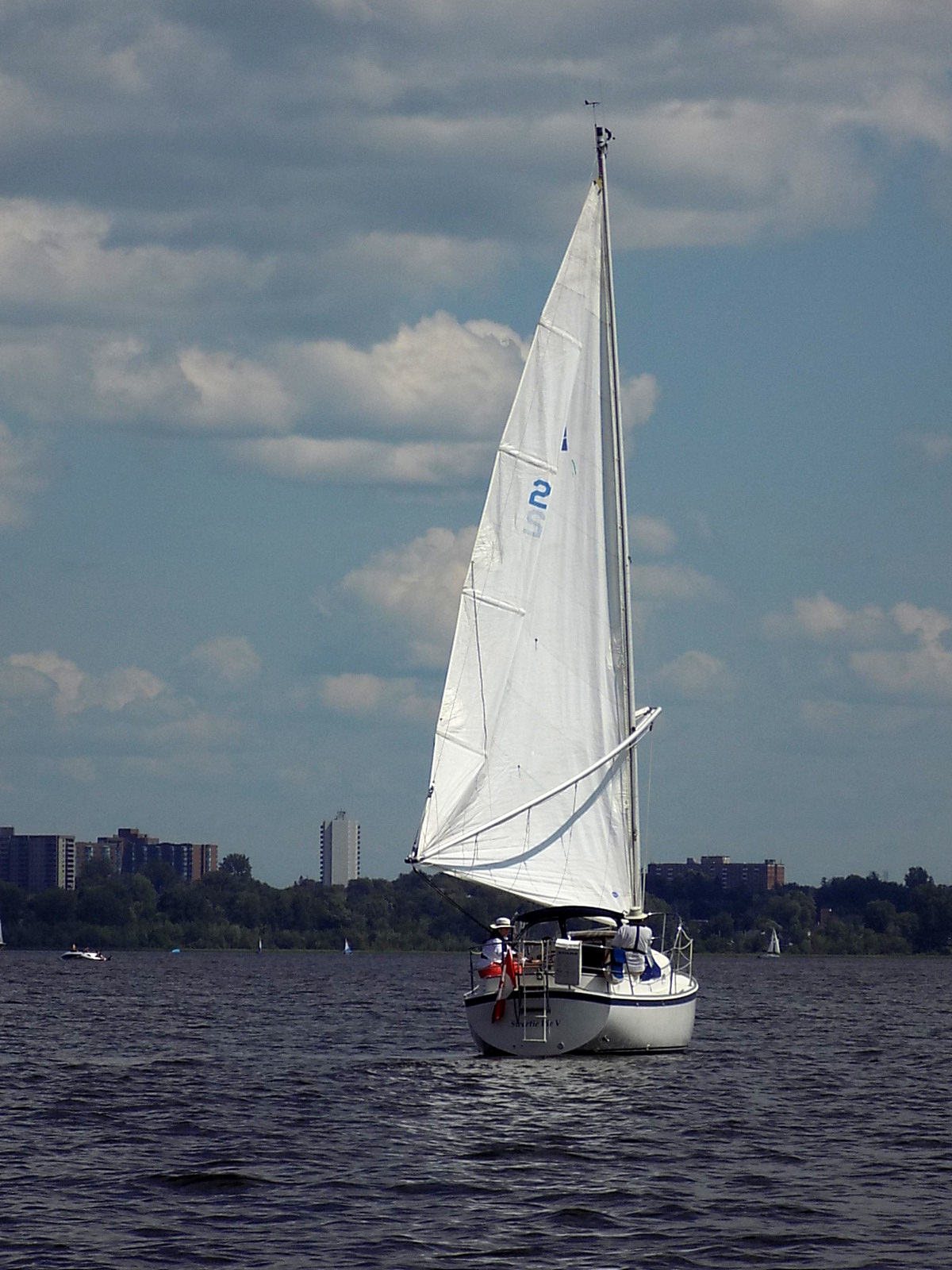
Nonsuch 22

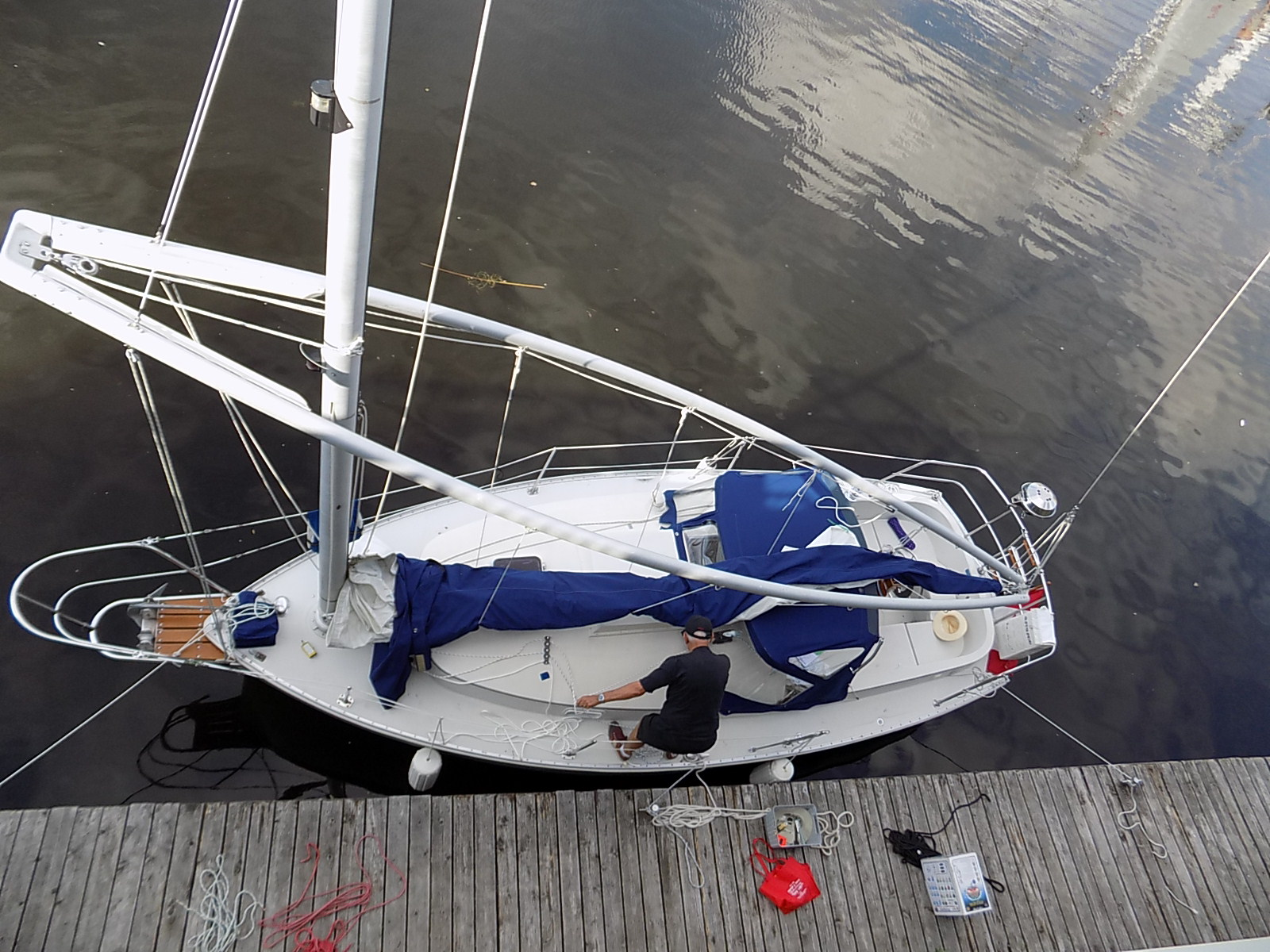
Nonsuch 22 showing the hull arrangement, mast location, bowsprit and the wishbone boom.

The Nonsuch 22 is a small, built predominantly of fiberglass. It has a catboat rig, an unstayed mast, with a wishbone boom, a plumb stem, a square transom, an internally-mounted spade-type rudder controlled by a wheel and a fixed fin keel. It displaces 5,000 lb (2,268 kg) and carries 1,800 lb (816 kg) of ballast.

The wishbone boom fulfills the role of a traditional boom and vang, as the angled wishbone cane be tensioned downwards to maintain sail shape when sailing downwind. The wishbone boom also provides additional head clearance for the crew.

The boat has a draft of 3.67 ft (1.12 m) with the standard keel fitted.

The boat is fitted with an 8 hp (6 kW) Westerbeke diesel engine or a 10 hp (7 kW) outboard motor for docking and maneuvering. The fuel tank holds 15 U.S. gallons (57 L; 12 imp gal) and the fresh water tank has a capacity of 23 U.S. gallons (87 L; 19 imp gal).

The design has a large cabin for a 22-foot boat, including an enclosed head and a small galley. During production the boat went through a re-design to correct deficiencies that had resulted from scaling the 22 down from the original 30-foot design. In giving it stand-up headroom, the original 22 was too tall for its beam and the headroom and overall coach house height was reduced in later versions produced.

The design has a PHRF racing average handicap of 240 with a high of 252 and low of 225. It has a hull speed of 6.07 kn (11.24 km/h).

== Reception ==
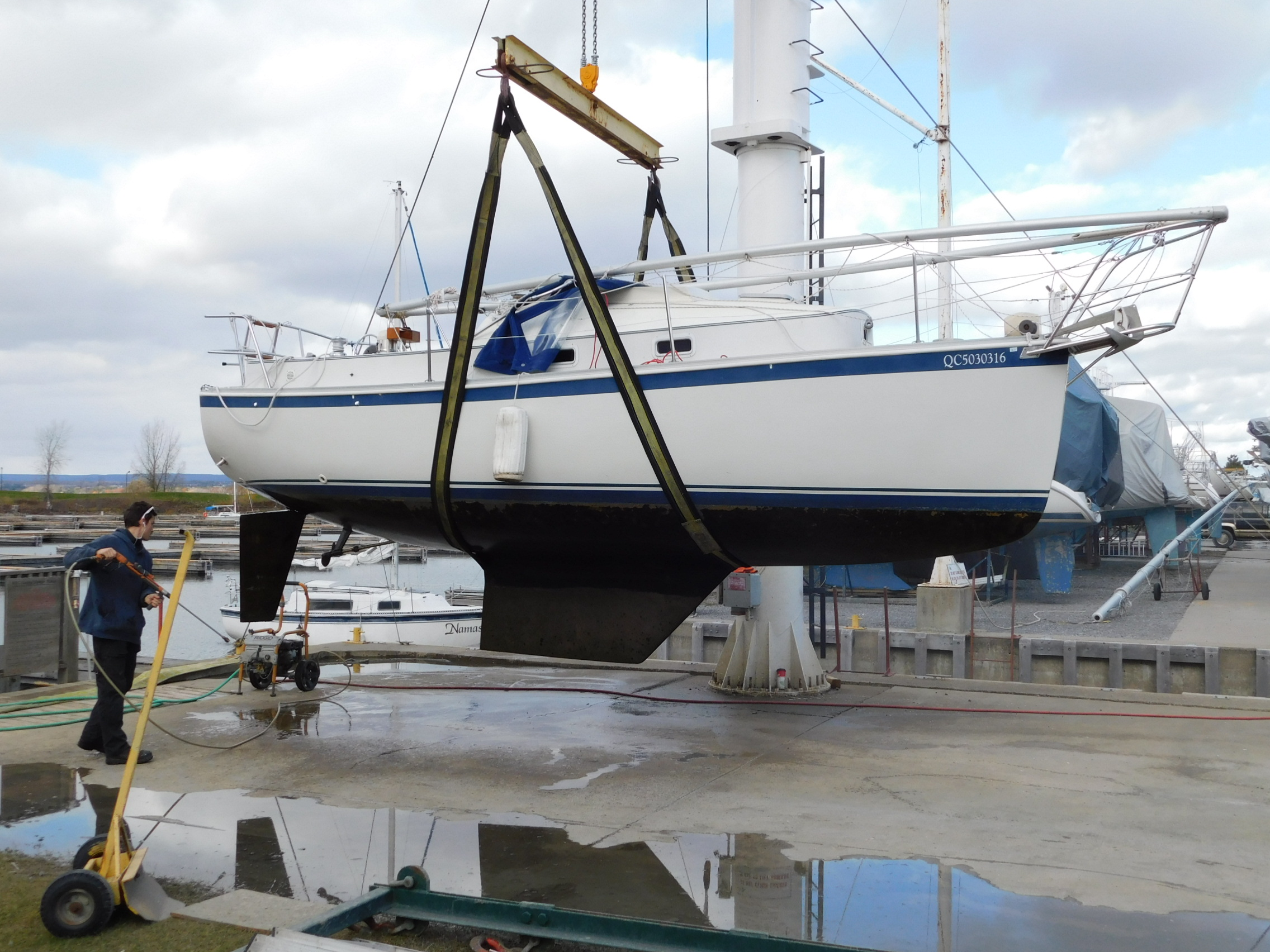
Nonsuch 22 on a dock crane, showing the keel and rudder arrangement

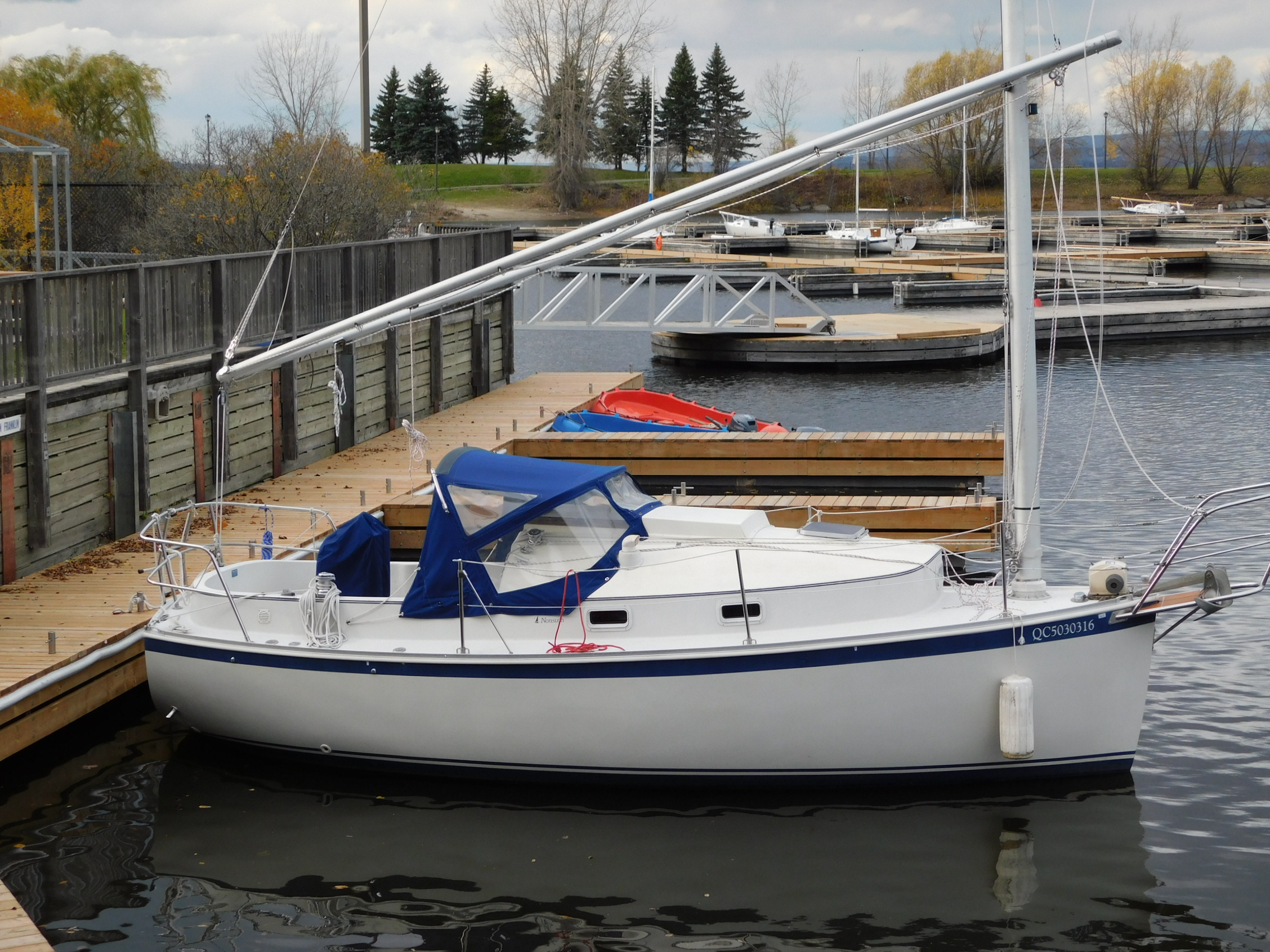
Nonsuch 22

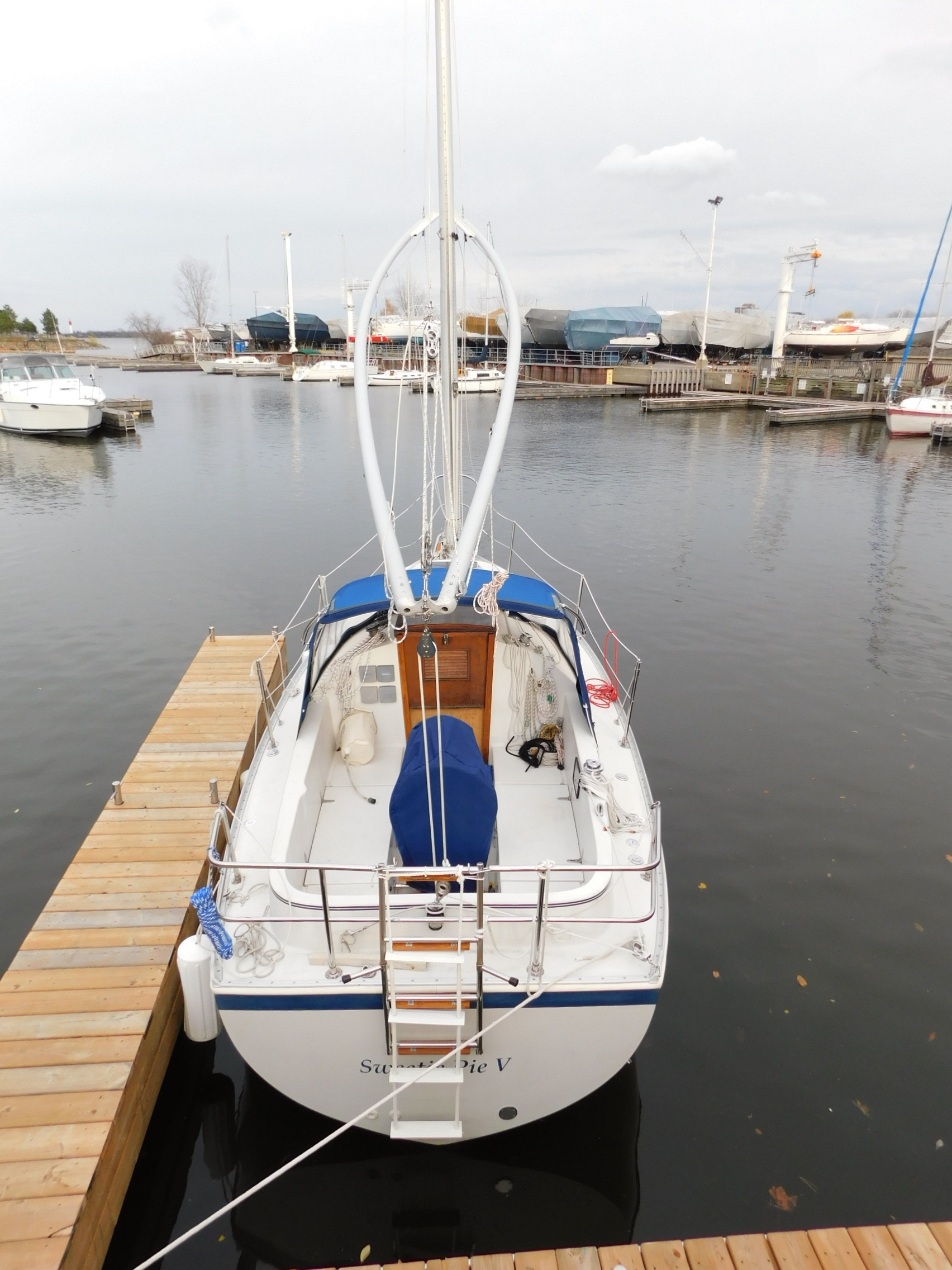
Nonsuch 22, stern view

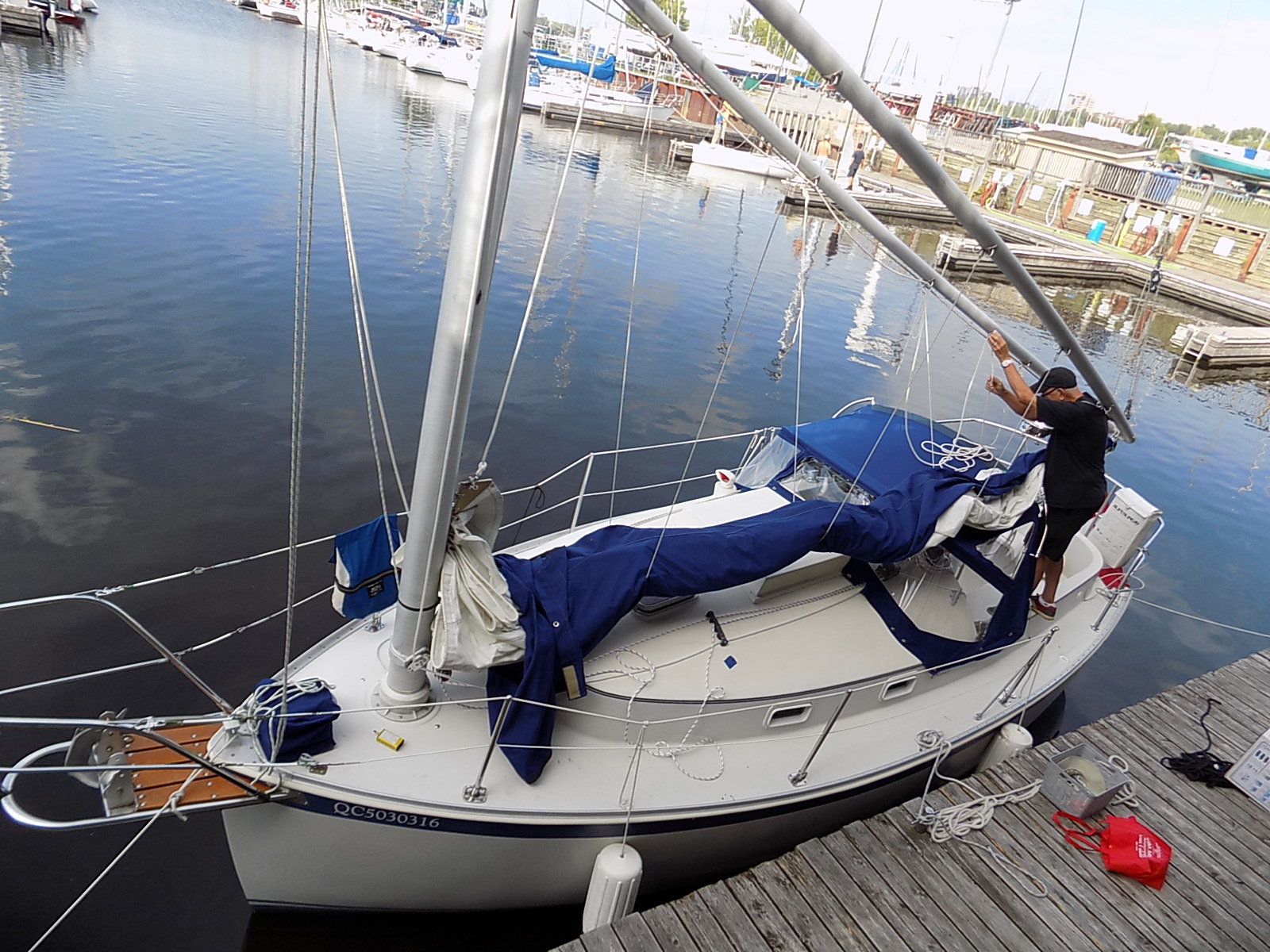
Nonsuch 22 from above, showing the bowsprit

In a review for Boats.com, Steve Killing, noted, "The original 22, of which almost 50 were produced, followed the tried and tested Nonsuch formula - a huge interior, standing headroom and high price tag. While the prescription for success worked flawlessly on the larger boats, the 22 had a few problems of scale that were corrected during manufacture of the boat into the late '80s...As with most boats this size, the market the original 22 found itself in was mainly composed of first-time buyers with little knowledge to let them justify the 22's price. I was amazed when Mark Ellis reminded me that the original 22 had an enclosed head and full galley. No wonder the price and freeboard were high."

In a 2010 review Steve Henkel wrote, "the Nonsuch 22 was designed for easy daysailing or cruising for a couple. It's not exactly a full-fledged traditional catboat; the beam is not quite as wide, the hull has a fin keel rather than a centerboard, and the sail is not gaff-rigged. In fact the wishbone rig, with its “cradle lines” to contain the lowered sail, is the boat's most distinctive feature. The whole idea is elegant simplicity, and the rig helps to make the boat quick to get underway and easy to put to bed. Best features: With the fin keel and spade rudder, helm response is instantaneous, and the boat will turn in her own length. (This is good for maneuvering around slips, but not so good when trying to hold a straight course at sea.) Finish is excellent, with all interior teak satin varnished, and cedar ceiling over the settee, The port settee can be extended to make a king-sized double if desired. Opening ports and forward hatch provide plenty of fresh air. The enclosed head has full headroom for an average sized male, rare in a 22-foot sailing vessel. Worst features: the unusual design appeals to a certain group of individualists, but not to everybody."
