= Nonsuch 40 =

Sailboat class

Development
- Designer: Mark Ellis Design
- Location: Taiwan
- Year: 1988
- No. built: 5
- Builders: Sen Koh Shipbuilding; Wiggers Custom Yachts
- Name: Nonsuch 40

Boat
- Displacement: 26,896 lb (12,200 kg)
- Draft: 6.56 ft (2.00 m)

Hull
- Type: Monohull
- Construction: Fiberglass
- LOA: 44.95 ft (13.70 m)
- LWL: 40.03 ft (12.20 m)
- Beam: 14.11 ft (4.30 m)
- Engine: Inboard diesel engine

Hull appendages
- Keel: fin keel
- Rudder: internally-mounted spade-type rudder

Rig
- Rig type: Cat rig

Sails
- Sailplan: Catboat

The Nonsuch 40 is a Taiwanese sailboat, that was designed by Mark Ellis Design and first built in 1988.

The Nonsuch 40 is a development of the Nonsuch 30, which was the first design in the Nonsuch series of sailboats.

== Production ==
The design was built by Sen Koh Shipbuilding in Taiwan, with the boats completed and fitted-out by Wiggers Custom Yachts in Canada. A total of 5 examples of the design were completed before production ended. The design was marketed as the Journeyman 40 in the United Kingdom and as the Sequioa 40 in Canada.

== Design ==
The Nonsuch 40 is a small recreational keelboat, built predominantly of fiberglass. It has a cat rig, an unstayed mast with a wishbone boom, a plumb stem, a vertical transom, an internally-mounted spade-type rudder controlled by a wheel and a fixed fin keel. It displaces 26,896 lb (12,200 kg).

The boat has a draft of 6.56 ft (2.00 m) with the standard keel fitted.

The design has a hull speed of 8.48 kn (15.70 km/h).

== See also ==
- List of sailing boat types
