= Nonsuch 30 =

Sailboat class

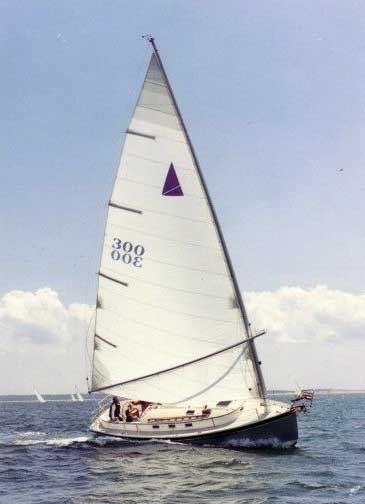

Development
- Designer: Mark Ellis
- Location: Canada
- Year: 1978
- No. built: 1080
- Builder: Hinterhoeller Yachts

Boat
- Displacement: 10,500 lb (4,763 kg)
- Draft: 5.00 ft (1.52 m)

Hull
- Type: Monohull
- Construction: Fiberglass
- LOA: 30.33 ft (9.24 m)
- LWL: 28.75 ft (8.76 m)
- Beam: 11.92 ft (3.63 m)
- Engine: Westerbeke 27 hp (20 kW) diesel engine

Hull appendages
- Keel: fin keel
- Ballast: 4,500 lb (2,041 kg)
- Rudder: internally-mounted spade-type rudder

Rig
- Rig type: Cat rigged
- P mainsail luff: 45.00 ft (13.72 m)
- E mainsail foot: 24.00 ft (7.32 m)

Sails
- Sailplan: Catboat
- Mainsail area: 540 sq ft (50 m^{2})
- Total sail area: 540 sq ft (50 m^{2})

Rating
- PHRF: 180 (average)

The Nonsuch 30 is a Canadian sailboat that was designed by Mark Ellis and first built in 1978. It was the first the series of Nonsuch sailboats and was scaled upwards and down, to form a complete line of boats, from the Nonsuch 22 to the Nonsuch 40.

The Nonsuch 30 hull design was used to create the 1994 Nonsuch 324, which features a carbon fibre wishbone boom, more sail area and a wing keel.

== Production ==
The first in the Nonsuch line of boat designs, the concept of a cruising catboat was proposed by Toronto businessman and sailor Gordon Fisher. Ellis designed the boats and they were built by Hinterhoeller Yachts in St. Catharines, Ontario, Canada, between 1978 and 1989, with 1080 examples completed.

== Design ==
The Nonsuch 30 is a small recreational keelboat, built predominantly of fiberglass, with wood trim. It has a cat rig, an unstayed mast with a wishbone boom, a plumb stem, a vertical transom, an internally-mounted spade-type rudder controlled by a wheel and a fixed fin keel. It displaces 10,500 lb (4,763 kg) and carries 4,500 lb (2,041 kg) of ballast.

The boat was built with three different interior floor plans, the classic, ultra and nova.

The boat has a draft of 5.00 ft (1.52 m) with the standard keel and 3.96 ft (1.21 m) with the shoal keel fitted.

The boat is fitted with a Westerbeke diesel engine of 27 hp (20 kW). The fuel tank holds 30 U.S. gallons (110 L; 25 imp gal) and the fresh water tank has a capacity of 86 U.S. gallons (330 L; 72 imp gal).

The design has a PHRF racing average handicap of 180 with a high of 192 and low of 156. It has a hull speed of 7.18 kn (13.30 km/h).

== Operational history ==
In a review Michael McGoldrick wrote, "although the Nonsuch's single large sail means that its windward ability will not equal that of a sloop with headsail, its modern underwater profile allows it to point higher than many people would expect. The fin keel and spade rudder found on the Nonsuches also does away with the windward helm which is characteristic of the Cape Cod catboats. One of the great advantages of the Nonsuch boats is that they are very easy to sail short-handed, or even single-handed. (For example, you only need to turn the wheel to tack this sailboat.) ... Because of the nature of their hull design, the Nonsuches are very big boats. In terms of interior volume, they are probably 20% to 30% larger than their length would indicate. At first glance, Nonsuches may seem a little expensive, but their prices are more competitive when compared to that of boats that are 20% to 30% larger."

In a review Richard Sherwood described the design, "the Nonsuch is typical of this type of boat. Although recently popular, there is nothing really new about either the cat rig or the wishbone boom. The mast is unstayed. The wishbone eliminates the need for vangs or travelers, and it imparts a draft to the sail. The sail can be raised, lowered, sheeted, and reefed from the cockpit. The catboat hull has been modified. Maximum beam is farther aft, entry is finer, aft lines are flat, there is a spade rudder, and the fin keel is available with two depths."

== See also ==
- List of sailing boat types
