= Freedom 36 Cat Ketch =

Sailboat class

Development
- Designer: Gary Mull
- Location: United States
- Year: 1985
- Builder: Tillotson Pearson Inc (Freedom Yachts)
- Name: Freedom 36 Cat Ketch

Boat
- Crew: two
- Displacement: 13,400 lb (6,100 kg)
- Draft: 6.00 ft (1.83 m) (with standard keel); 4.5 ft (1.4 m) (with shoal draft keel)

Hull
- Construction: Fiberglass
- LOA: 36.42 ft (11.10 m)
- LWL: 30.58 ft (9.32 m)
- Beam: 12.50 ft (3.81 m)

Rig
- General: Free-standing ketch rig

Sails
- Total sail area: 682 sq ft (63.4 m^{2})

Racing
- PHRF: 144 (average)

The Freedom 36 Cat Ketch, also called the Freedom 36 CC, is an American sailboat designed by Gary Mull and first built in 1985. The design is out of production.

== Production ==
Tillotson Pearson built the boat in the United States for Freedom Yachts.

== Design ==
The Freedom 36 Cat Ketch is a small recreational keelboat, built predominantly of fiberglass, with wood trim. It has a free-standing ketch rig, with the aft mast slightly shorter than the fore mast and both masts rigged with cat sails, an internally-mounted spade-type rudder and a fixed fin keel. With the standard keel, it displaces 13,400 lb (6,078 kg) and carries 6,500 lb (2,948 kg) of ballast.

The boat has a draft of 6.00 ft (1.83 m) with the standard keel and 4.5 ft (1.4 m) with the optional shoal draft keel.

The boat is fitted with a Japanese Yanmar diesel engine of 27 hp (20 kW).

The boat has a PHRF racing average handicap of 144 with a high of 153 and a low of 141. It has a hull speed of 7.41 kn (13.72 km/h).

== See also ==
- List of sailing boat types
