= Naiad 18 =

1980s open sailboat

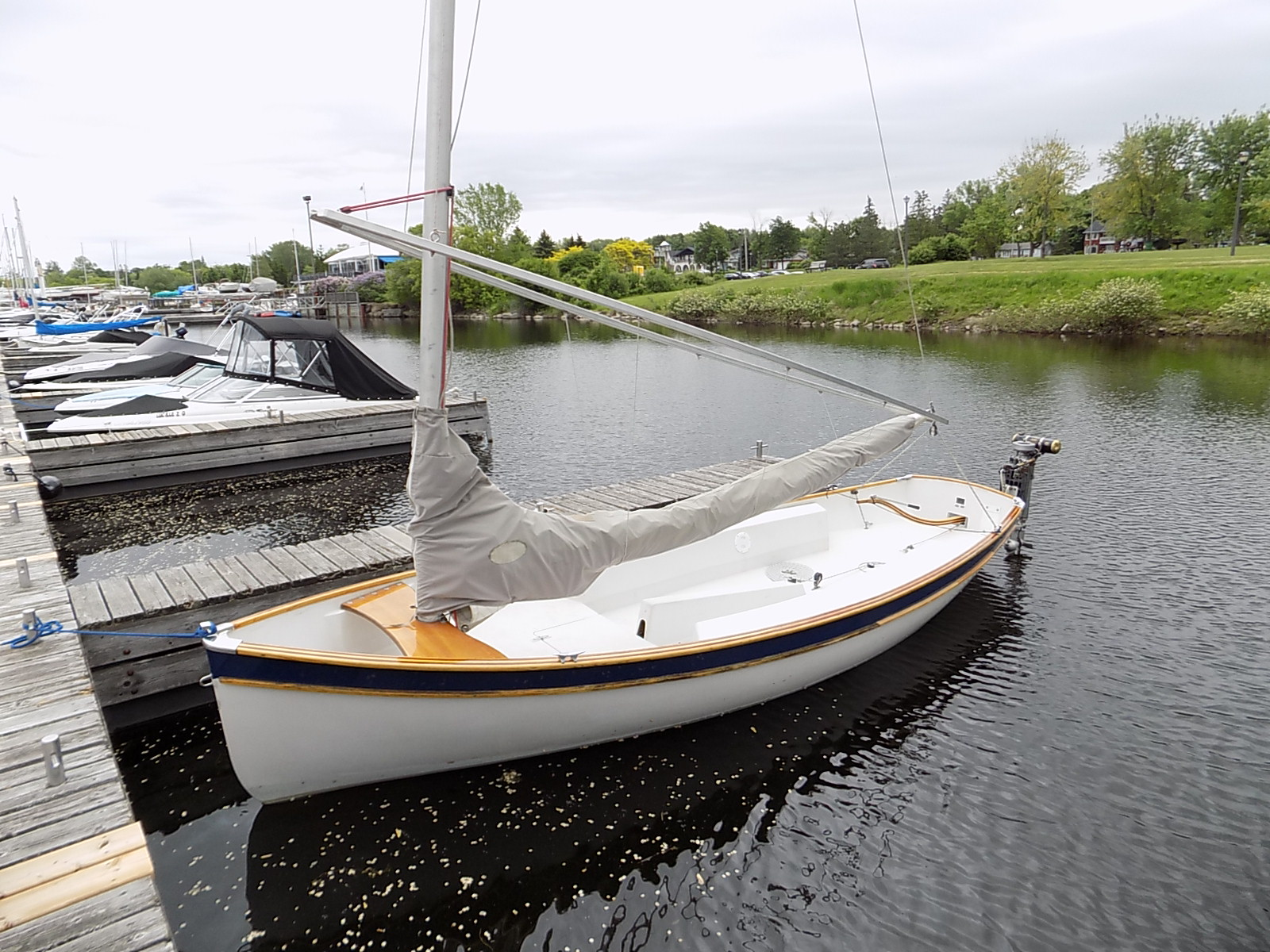

Development
- Designer: Mark Ellis
- Location: Canada
- Year: 1984 to 1986
- Builder: Luna Yachts
- Name: Naiad 18

Boat
- Displacement: 1,100 lb (499 kg)
- Draft: 3.67 ft (1.12 m) centreboard down

Hull
- Type: Monohull
- Construction: Fiberglass
- LOA: 18.25 ft (5.56 m)
- LWL: 17.50 ft (5.33 m)
- Beam: 6.00 ft (1.83 m)
- Engine: Outboard motor

Hull appendages
- Keel: centreboard
- Ballast: 550 lb (249 kg)
- Rudder: transom-mounted rudder

Rig
- Rig type: Cat rig

Sails
- Sailplan: Catboat
- Mainsail area: 144 sq ft (13.4 m^{2})
- Total sail area: 144 sq ft (13.4 m^{2})

The Naiad 18 is a sailboat built by Luna Yachts in Oakville, Ontario, Canada, between 1984 and 1986, and named for the mythological water sprites.

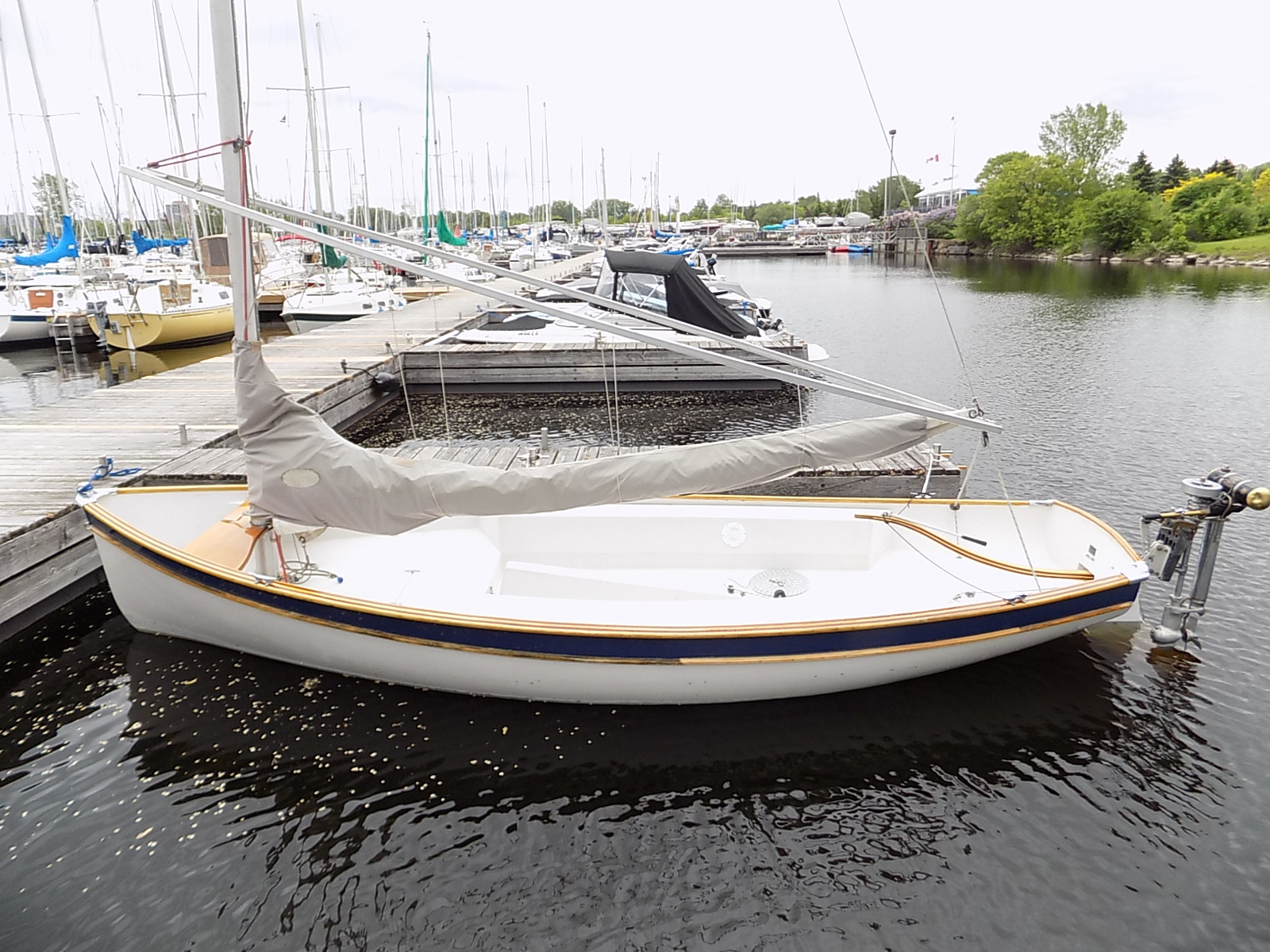
Naiad 18 equipped with a British Seagull outboard motor

The Naiad 18 is a small, open, recreational keelboat, built predominantly of fiberglass, with wood trim. It has a cat rig, a plumb stem, a vertical transom, a transom-hung rudder, a wishbone boom and a centerboard that folds up into a trunk. It displaces 1,100 lb (499 kg) and carries 550 lb (249 kg) of ballast.

The boat has a draft of 3.67 ft (1.12 m) with the centreboard extended and 0.67 ft (0.20 m) with it retracted.

The design has a hull speed of 5.61 kn (10.39 km/h).
