= Freedom 45 =

Sailboat class

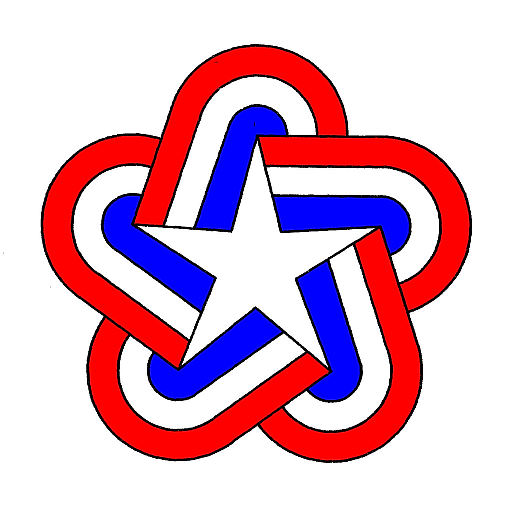

Development
- Designer: Gary Mull
- Location: United States
- Year: 1987
- Builder: Tillotson Pearson Inc (Freedom Yachts)
- Name: Freedom 45

Boat
- Crew: two
- Displacement: 22,992 lb (10,429 kg)
- Draft: 4.92 ft (1.50 m)

Hull
- Construction: Fiberglass
- LOA: 45.00 ft (13.72 m)
- LWL: 34.40 ft (10.49 m)
- Beam: 13.50 ft (4.11 m)

Hull appendages
- Keel: wing keel
- Ballast: 9,500 lb (4,300 kg)

Rig
- General: Free-standing Fractional rigged sloop
- I foretriangle height: 38.40 ft (11.70 m)
- J foretriangle base: 13.85 ft (4.22 m)
- P mainsail luff: 50.33 ft (15.34 m)
- E mainsail foot: 18.50 ft (5.64 m)

Sails
- Mainsail area: 465.55 sq ft (43.251 m^{2})
- Jib/genoa area: 265.92 sq ft (24.705 m^{2})
- Total sail area: 731.47 sq ft (67.956 m^{2})

Racing
- PHRF: 99 (average)

The Freedom 45 is an American sailboat, that was designed by Gary Mull and first built in 1987. The design is out of production.

The Freedom 45 is a development of the Freedom 42, created by extending the aft section of the hull.

== Production ==
The boat was built by Tillotson Pearson in the United States for Freedom Yachts, starting in 1987.

== Design ==
The Freedom 45 is a small recreational keelboat, built predominantly of fiberglass, with wood trim. It has a free-standing fractional sloop, an internally-mounted rudder and a fixed wing keel. It displaces 22,992 lb (10,429 kg) and carries 9,500 lb (4,309 kg) of ballast. It has a draft of 4.92 ft (1.50 m) with the standard winged keel.

The boat is fitted with a Japanese Yanmar 4JH HTBE diesel engine of 66 hp (49 kW).

The boat has a PHRF racing average handicap of 99 with a high of 99 and low of 102. It has a hull speed of 7.86 kn (14.56 km/h).

== Variants ==
Freedom 45 AC
Model with an aft cockpit configuration.
Freedom 45 CC
Model with a center cockpit configuration.

== See also ==
- List of sailing boat types
