= Mark Ellis (yacht designer) =

Sailboat and power boat designer

Mark Ellis (born 4 February 1945 died 2025) was an American-Canadian naval architect, who designed sixteen production sailboats, along with many custom sailboats and powerboats. He is best known for his Nonsuch series of catboats, the Limestone series of powerboats and Niagara sailboats. In 2003, Dan Spurr described Ellis as "one of Canada's premier yacht designers".

Ellis was born in Watertown, New York, United States and lived a major portion of his adult life in Oakville, Ontario. He died in Essex, Connecticut United States and held dual American citizenship and Canadian citizenship.

== Early life and education ==
Ellis grew up in upstate New York, where his father owned a department store. As a boy Ellis worked in the store and gained his first experience with business. He applied for a degree program in naval architecture at the University of Michigan but decided not to pursue it when he discovered that it mostly focused on large ship design, instead of small boats, which was where his interests lay. He went on to complete a degree in business administration at Boston University instead.

His family were sailors and Ellis learned to sail on an Atkin yawl, on Lake Ontario. His family went on to buy an island in the Thousand Islands and Ellis sailed there. He raced Dragon keelboats and became an instructor at the Clayton Yacht Club in Clayton, New York and the Crescent Yacht Club in Chaumont, New York.

== Design career ==
Ellis started his career in 1965, at age 20 while attending university. His first job in the boat building industry was scraping the barnacles from boat bottoms. He liked to draw boat designs and described himself as a "doodler-draughtsman". He apprenticed at C. Raymond Hunt & Associates and, after graduating in 1968, under Phillip Rhodes. He quickly became a project manager for three custom boats being built in West Germany, using his business training to act as the liaison between the customer and the yard building the boats. With the birth of his first child Ellis and his wife decided to move away from New York City and so Ellis went on to work for Ted Hood at Little Harbour Boat Yard in Marblehead, Massachusetts, where he designed sailboat rigs as well as accommodation and deck plans. In 1970 Ellis and his family then moved to Canada where he worked in the design office at C&C Yachts under George Cuthbertson and George Cassian. At C&C he became a specialist in rig design, with his first assignment the C&C 61 Sorcery and second the C&C 43-1. Given his business background, Ellis gravitated to that end of the operation, noting that C&C did not have "a strong business orientation … boats would leave without being paid for, that sort of thing." Ellis ended up doing sales for C&C's custom division, the Bruckmann yard.

In 1975 C&C decided to expand, with new plants in West Germany and Rhode Island, despite an industry downturn underway. Ellis noted that he thought that business decision was more "eager than sense". Ellis decided to leave C&C and form his own design firm, Mark Ellis Design LLC, located in Oakville and later with offices in Essex, Connecticut.

Ellis' first design commission was the Aurora 40, but his second boat was the Nonsuch 30, a cruising catboat for customer Gordon Fisher. It became the first of what would become a large line of successful Nonsuch sailboats.

Ellis' background in business give him the knowledge and experience in writing contracts to retain control of his designs. Whereas many designers would design for a one-time payment for the rights, Ellis retained the rights to each of his designs and was paid for each individual boat completed. His contracts also gave him control of the tooling for the design, if the original manufacturer ended production or went out of business, allowing his designs to be more easily moved to a new manufacturer.

Ellis also designed powerboats. His first design was the Limestone 24 for customer Fred Eaton, which was constructed by Hinterhoeller Yachts in St. Catharines, Ontario. His second powerboat was the Limestone 20 for Medeiros Boat Works, of Oakville, Ontario.

Ellis designed the Legacy 40, a lobster boat-inspired powerboat design. The tooling was built by Bruckmann in Ontario and then sold to Freedom Yachts in the US for production. The boat was introduced at the 1994 Newport Boat Show.

He also designed motorsailers, boats that combined sailboat rigging with hull designs optimized for motoring as well. His first design was the Northeast 37, which was built by Costa Rican boatbuilder Cabo Rico.

In 2003, Ellis described the 47-foot sloop, Volunteer, as his favourite design. The boat is a custom design for customer Fred Eaton. Built in 1996, it incorporates many style elements from the past, including a raked stem, a raised counter transom, with a long overhang, a low freeboard and a powerful rig.

In describing his own sailboat design philosophy, Ellis said in 2003, "there are really two sides to it. One is aesthetics, which is very important to me. There's a classic line that lasts; 20 years later it still appeals. I don't like trendy, boxy boats, though I can see the reason behind them, like stretching waterlines, but I've never liked bad aesthetics for no good reason. From a performance standpoint, I've done enough racing to like a boat with a nice motion. Balance is key. I could never go along with boats that are odd-shaped and have a cranky motion."

Of his design philosophy, reviewer Paul Howard wrote in Canadian Yachting, "Ellis avoid[s] trends, designing boats for longevity in the way they please the eye and their durability in use."

In 2003, when Ellis was 58 years old, he was living in Oakville and actively sailing and powerboating, still maintaining the family vacation home in the Thousand Islands.At the time of his death in 2025 he was living in Essex, Connecticut in the United States.

== Designs ==
Production sailboat designs by Ellis include:

- Aurora 40 - 1976
- Niagara 35 - 1978
- Nonsuch 30 - 1978
- Aloha 32 - 1979
- Nonsuch 26 - 1982
- Nonsuch 36 - 1983
- Naiad 18 - 1984
- Niagara 35 (Encore) - 1984
- Niagara 42 - 1984
- Nonsuch 22 - 1984
- Great Lakes 36 - 1986
- Nonsuch 33 - 1988
- Nonsuch 40 - 1988
- Nonsuch 324 - 1994
- Northeast 400 - 1995
- Bruckmann 50 - 2004

Production powerboat designs by Ellis include:

- Bruckmann Bluestar 29.9
- Bruckmann Bluestar Express 34
- Bruckmann Bluestar 38
- Bruckmann Abaco 40
- Bruckmann Abaco 47
- Legacy 40
- Legacy 34
- Limestone 17
- Limestone 20
- Limestone 22
- Limestone 24
- Pilot 19
- Pilot 24

Production motorsailer designs by Ellis include:

- Bruckmann 480
- Northeast 37
