= Balestron rig =

A balestron rig is a sailplan involving a boom that extends forwards of the mast and is pivoted on it. It is a balanced rig. It involves a mainsail and a smaller jib on an unstayed mast.

Mainsail and jib are controlled by a single sheet. The rig was extensively used on model boats but has recently been used of full-sized vessels. On model boats, it dramatically reduces the energy consumption of sail trimming.
