= Freedom 21 =

Sailboat class

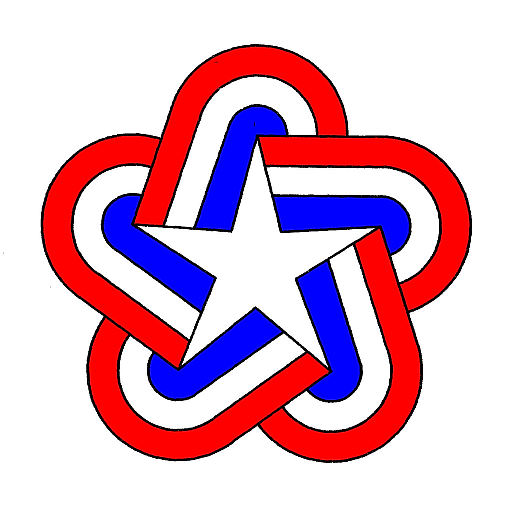

Development
- Designer: Gary Hoyt
- Location: United States
- Year: 1982
- Builder: Tillotson Pearson for Freedom Yachts

Boat
- Displacement: 2,000 lb (907 kg)
- Draft: 3.75 ft (1.14 m)

Hull
- Type: monohull
- Construction: fiberglass
- LOA: 21.67 ft (6.61 m)
- LWL: 17.50 ft (5.33 m)
- Beam: 8.00 ft (2.44 m)
- Engine: outboard motor

Hull appendages
- Keel: fin keel
- Ballast: 500 lb (227 kg)
- Rudder: transom-mounted rudder

Rig
- Rig type: Catboat
- P mainsail luff: 24.42 ft (7.44 m)
- E mainsail foot: 10.75 ft (3.28 m)

Sails
- Sailplan: Catboat
- Mainsail area: 131.26 sq ft (12.194 m^{2})
- Total sail area: 131.26 sq ft (12.194 m^{2})

Racing
- PHRF: 260

The Freedom 21 is an American trailerable sailboat that was designed by Gary Hoyt and first built in 1982. It was available as a catboat or sloop rig.

== Production ==
The design was built by Tillotson Pearson for Freedom Yachts in the United States from 1982 to 1987, but it is now out of production.

A retractable twin wing keel, iron ballast version was also built in the United Kingdom and at least 40 were sold.

== Design ==
The Freedom 21 is a recreational keelboat, built predominantly of fiberglass, with wood trim. It has a catboat rig with a freestanding carbon fiber mast and a fully-battened mainsail. A sloop rig was optional. The hull has a raked stem, a vertical transom, a transom-hung rudder controlled by a tiller and a fixed fin keel or shoal draft keel.

The boat is normally fitted with a small 3 to 6 hp (2 to 4 kW) outboard motor for docking and maneuvering.

The design has sleeping accommodation for four people, with a double "V"-berth in the bow cabin and two straight settee berths in the main cabin. The galley is located on the starboard side just aft of the bow cabin. The galley is equipped with a sink. Cabin headroom is 54 in (140 cm).

For sailing the design is equipped with gun-mount spinnaker with a launching tube.

The design has a PHRF racing average handicap of 260 and a hull speed of 5.6 kn (10.4 km/h).

== Variants ==
Freedom 21
This catboat model displaces 2,000 lb (907 kg) and carries 500 lb (227 kg) of ballast. The boat has a draft of 3.75 ft (1.14 m) with the standard keel.
Freedom 21 SLP
This sloop-rigged model displaces 1,800 lb (816 kg) and carries 500 lb (227 kg) of ballast. The boat has a draft of 3.80 ft (1.16 m) with the standard keel.
Freedom 21 SLP SD
This shoal draft model displaces 2,050 lb (930 kg) and has a draft of 2.00 ft (0.61 m).

== Operational history ==
In a 2010 review Steve Henkel wrote, "here's a catboat with a modern flavor ... The deep fin is a better performer, but hard to get off a trailer without a crane. Best features: Deep cockpit coamings and a cockpit well proportioned for good foot-bracing help make the Freedom 21 a pleasure to sail. So does the easy-to-control gunmount spinnaker arrangement, which allows you to douse the chute by just popping the halyard and lowering the chute into its launching tube by hauling on a retrieving line. Worst features: Going forward isn't always easy, since the port side is taken over by the chute launching tube. She's not fast upwind, especially as a catboat. (A staysail can be rigged.) And her unusual appearance, with dark, wraparound 'windshield,' may not appeal to everyone."

== See also ==
- List of sailing boat types
