= Freedom 30 =

Sailboat class

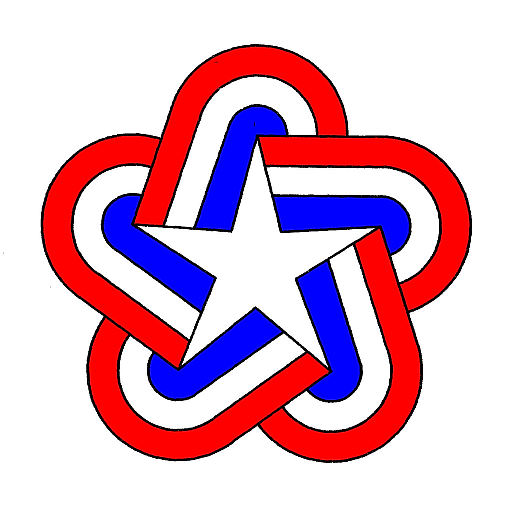

Development
- Designer: Gary Mull
- Location: United States
- Year: 1986
- Builder: Tillotson Pearson Inc (Freedom Yachts)
- Name: Freedom 30

Boat
- Crew: two
- Displacement: 7,660 lb (3,470 kg)
- Draft: 5.5 ft (1.7 m) (conventional keel); 4.5 ft (1.4 m) (shallow-draft keel)

Hull
- Construction: Fiberglass
- LOA: 29.97 ft (9.13 m)
- LWL: 25.42 ft (7.75 m)
- Beam: 10.75 ft (3.28 m)
- Engine: Yanmar 2GM20F diesel engine, 18 hp (13 kW)

Rig
- General: Free-standing fractional rigged sloop
- I foretriangle height: 28.38 ft (8.65 m)
- J foretriangle base: 9.83 ft (3.00 m)
- P mainsail luff: 38.16 ft (11.63 m)
- E mainsail foot: 13.91 ft (4.24 m)

Sails
- Mainsail area: 265.40 sq ft (24.656 m^{2})
- Jib/genoa area: 139.49 sq ft (12.959 m^{2})
- Total sail area: 404.89 sq ft (37.616 m^{2})

Racing
- PHRF: 171 (average)

The Freedom 30 is an American sailboat, that was designed by Gary Mull and first built in 1986. The design is out of production.

== Production ==
The boat was built by Tillotson Pearson in the United States for Freedom Yachts, starting in 1986.

== Design ==
The Freedom 30 is a small recreational keelboat, built predominantly of fiberglass, with wood trim. It has a free-standing fractional rigged sloop rig, an internally-mounted spade-type rudder and a fixed fin keel. It displaces 7,660 lb (3,475 kg) and carries 3,150 lb (1,429 kg) of lead ballast.

The boat is fitted with a Japanese Yanmar 2GM20F diesel engine of 18 hp (13 kW).

The boat has a PHRF racing average handicap of 171 with a high of 174 and low of 171. It has a hull speed of 6.76 kn (12.52 km/h).

== Variants ==
Freedom 30
Base model with a conventional keel and a draft of 5.5 ft (1.7 m).
Freedom 30 SD
Model with a shallow-draft keel and a draft of 4.5 ft (1.4 m).
Freedom 32 and 32-2
Model renamed in 1988, with the addition of a boarding and swimming platform to the stern.

== See also ==
- List of sailing boat types
