= Freedom 38 =

Sailboat class

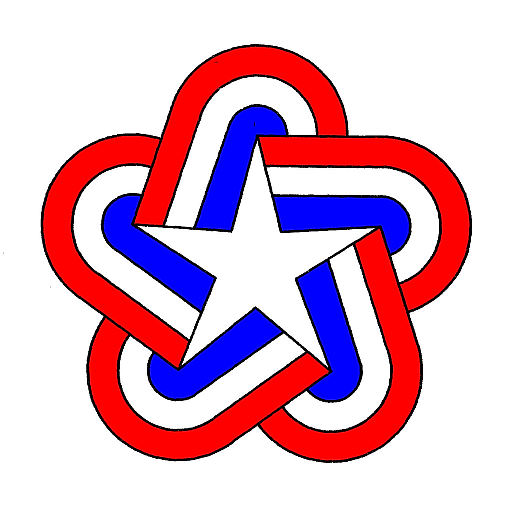

Development
- Designer: Gary Mull
- Location: United States
- Year: 1989
- Builder: Tillotson Pearson Inc (Freedom Yachts)
- Name: Freedom 38

Boat
- Crew: two
- Displacement: 13,400 lb (6,100 kg)
- Draft: 4.50 ft (1.37 m)

Hull
- Construction: Fiberglass
- LOA: 38.00 ft (11.58 m)
- LWL: 30.62 ft (9.33 m)
- Beam: 12.50 ft (3.81 m)

Hull appendages
- Keel: wing keel
- Ballast: 5,530 lb (2,510 kg) of lead
- Rudder: internal spade-type

Rig
- General: Fractional rigged sloop
- I foretriangle height: 33.80 ft (10.30 m)
- J foretriangle base: 11.50 ft (3.51 m)
- P mainsail luff: 45.50 ft (13.87 m)
- E mainsail foot: 16.60 ft (5.06 m)

Sails
- Mainsail area: 377.65 sq ft (35.085 m^{2})
- Jib/genoa area: 194.35 sq ft (18.056 m^{2})
- Total sail area: 572.00 sq ft (53.141 m^{2})

Racing
- PHRF: 144 (average)

The Freedom 38 is an American sailboat, that was designed by Gary Mull and first built in 1989.

The Freedom 38 is a development of the Freedom 36.

== Production ==
The boat was built by Tillotson Pearson in the United States for Freedom Yachts, starting in 1989. The design is out of production.

== Design ==
The Freedom 38 is a small recreational keelboat, built predominantly of fiberglass, with wood trim. It has a free-standing fractional sloop rig, an internally-mounted spade-type rudder and a fixed fin wing keel. It displaces 13,400 lb (6,078 kg) and carries 5,530 lb (2,508 kg) of lead ballast.

The boat is fitted with a Japanese Yanmar 3GM diesel engine of 27 hp (20 kW).

The boat has a PHRF racing average handicap of 144 and a hull speed of 7.41 kn (13.72 km/h).

== See also ==
- List of sailing boat types
