= Freedom 25 =

Sailboat class

Development
- Designer: Garry Hoyt
- Location: United States
- Year: 1980
- Builder: Freedom Yachts/Tillotson Pearson
- Name: Freedom 25

Boat
- Displacement: 3,500 lb (1,588 kg)
- Draft: 4.42 ft (1.35 m)

Hull
- Type: Monohull
- Construction: Fiberglass
- LOA: 25.67 ft (7.82 m)
- LWL: 20.00 ft (6.10 m)
- Beam: 8.50 ft (2.59 m)
- Engine: Optional diesel engine or Outboard motor

Hull appendages
- Keel: fin keel
- Ballast: 1,025 lb (465 kg)
- Rudder: transom-mounted rudder

Rig
- Rig type: Cat rig

Sails
- Sailplan: Catboat
- Total sail area: 260 sq ft (24 m^{2})

Racing
- PHRF: 210 (average)

The Freedom 25 is an American sailboat that was designed by Garry Hoyt as a single-handed racer-cruiser and first built in 1980.

== Production ==
The design was built by Tillotson Pearson for Freedom Yachts in the United States, but it is now out of production.

== Design ==
The Freedom 25 is a recreational keelboat, built predominantly of fiberglass, with wood trim. It has a catboat rig or optional fractional sloop rig with a staysail, a spooned raked stem, a vertical transom, a transom-hung rudder controlled by a tiller and a fixed fin keel. It carries 1,025 lb (465 kg) of lead ballast.

The spars are carbon fiber. The mast is unstayed, and on earlier models, has a rotating airfoil cross-section shape. The mainsail is fully battened and lowers into lazy jacks. A spinnaker is used, flown from an unusual pole that extends though a "gun mount" sleeve mounted to the steel framed pulpit and is not attached to the mast unlike the usual spinnaker pole. This arrangement means that spinnaker winches are not needed and the spinnaker can be raised from the cockpit. The spinnaker pole retracts when not in use, stowing along the lifeline.

The boat has a draft of 4.42 ft (1.35 m) with the standard keel fitted.

The boat is fitted with an optional diesel engine or a small outboard motor for docking and maneuvering. The fuel tank holds 10 U.S. gallons (38 L; 8.3 imp gal) and the fresh water tank has a capacity of 10 U.S. gallons (38 L; 8.3 imp gal).

The accommodations consist of two cabin berths that are partly under the cockpit and a forward "V"-berth. There is a small galley fitted, with a two-burner alcohol stove, portable cooler and a private head. The cabin sole is teak and holly, while the bulkheads and other trim are painted white or made from ash.

The design has a hull speed of 5.99 kn (11.09 km/h).

== Operational history ==
In a 2010 review Steve Henkel wrote, "Garry Hoyt, main designer and marketer of the Freedom line of sailboats, is known as a free thinker when it comes to sailboat design. The Freedom 25, with her full-battened mainsail, small 'staysail' jib, 'gunmount' spinnaker handling gear, and unstayed mast, is a good example of the fruition of Hoyt's thinking. Hoyt says full-length battens have several advantages, the main one being ease of reefing, 'A sailor wants a sail he can get up and get down quickly, a sail that is easy to handle, can be reefed easily, and provides acceptable performance.' The fully battened sails are quieter too. The little jib, which was an option on new boats, improves upwind performance in light air. The gunmount makes using a spinnaker a singlehanded job: one sailor can hoist, jibe, and douse the spinnaker without ever leaving the cockpit. The unstayed mast simplifies the rig and makes getting underway faster. Best features: Besides the above, the cockpit is deep and comfortable, with good back support. Worst features: The wing mast and sail sleeves on early boats didn't work out. Consequently, a conventional sailtrack on a round mast was used on most production."

== Variants ==
Freedom 25 Staysail
This model was introduced in 1980. It displaces 3,920 lb (1,778 kg) and carries 1,025 lb (465 kg) of ballast. The boat has a PHRF racing average handicap of 213 with a high of 198 and low of 228.
Freedom 25
This model was introduced in 1981. It displaces 3,500 lb (1,588 kg) and carries 1,025 lb (465 kg) of ballast. The boat has a PHRF racing average handicap of 210 with a high of 237 and low of 201.

== See also ==
- List of sailing boat types
