= Nonsuch (sailboat) =

Canadian family of catboats

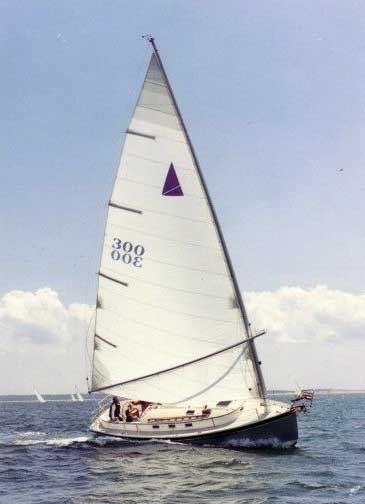
A Nonsuch 30 under sail

The Nonsuch line of catboats is a series of popular cruising sailboats built between 1978 and the mid-1990s by Hinterhoeller Yachts in St. Catharines, Ontario. They are popular in North America, with over 950 boats built. The Nonsuch class was named after the Nonsuch that was the first trading vessel of Hudson's Bay Company, which in turn was named after the Baroness Nonsuch (Barbara Palmer), a mistress of King Charles II of England.

== History ==
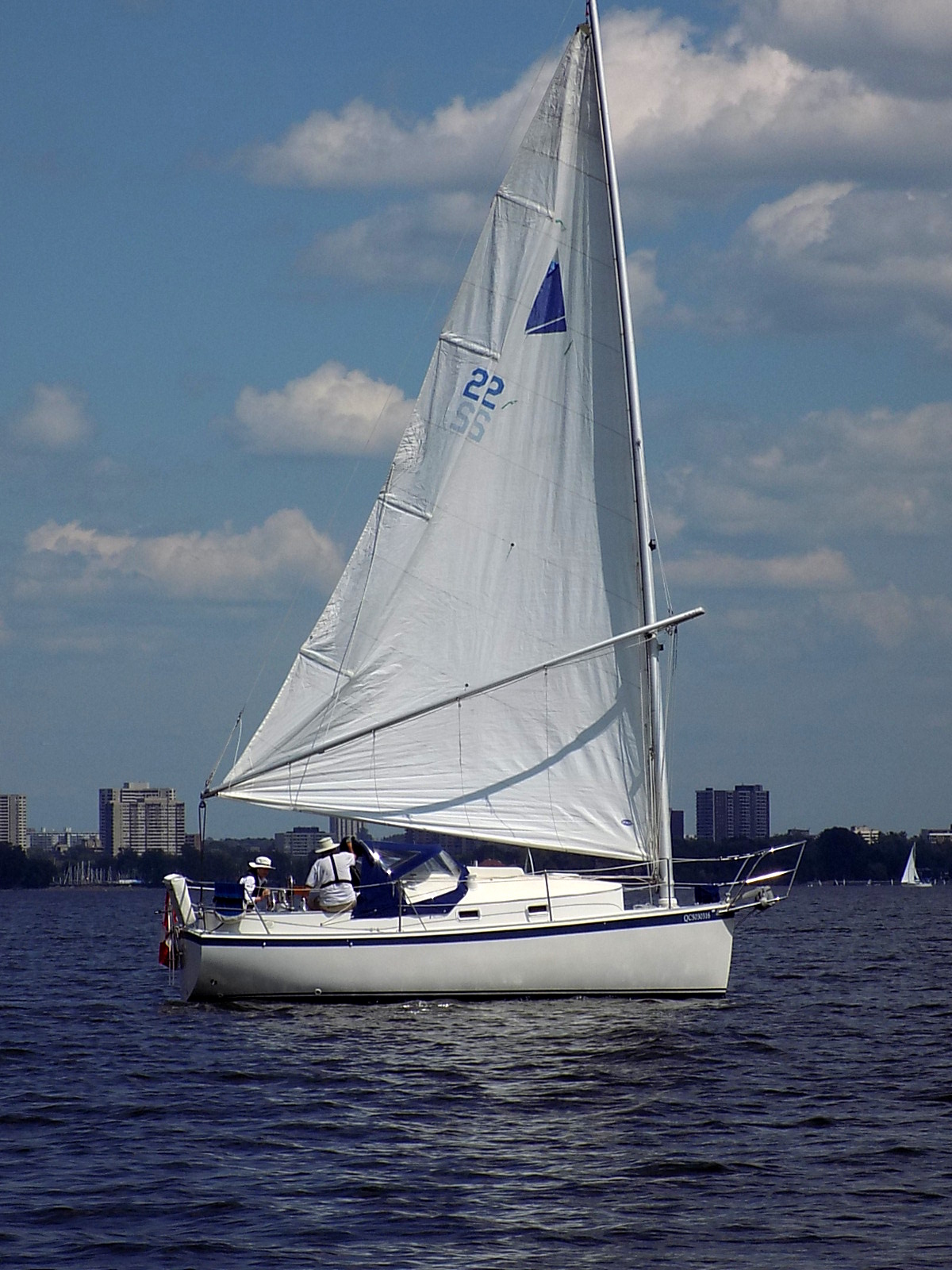
Nonsuch 22

Number of boats built, by model
Model	Number Built
22	58
26	258
30	522
33	67
36	70
40	6
324	"a few"

In the mid-1970s, Gordon Fisher, a respected Canadian sailor, commissioned designer Mark Ellis to create a design for a cruising sailboat which would have decent accommodations, but still be easy for a singlehander to manage. Ellis designed a Ljungström rig, modified with a wishbone boom, on a 30-foot modern hull with a plumb bow, fin keel and balanced rudder. A beam of nearly 12 feet and cambered house-top created a large interior with accommodation equal to a standard yacht several feet longer. George Hinterhoeller, after some initial reservations about the design, agreed to build the boats, and the first Nonsuch 30 rolled out of his shop in the summer of 1978.

Additional models were created in 22, 26, 32, 33, 36 and 40 foot lengths, with the 26 and 30 both available in "Classic" and "Ultra" configurations. The original boats were built with an unstayed, two-piece aluminum mast and wishbone boom. In later years, under new ownership, the factory produced new versions of 3 of its models, all with shoal draft keels one-piece carbon fiber masts. By the time Hinterhoeller closed its doors in January 1996, a total of 975 Nonsuch boats had been built.

Reviewer Steve Killing noted, "The Nonsuch series of cat-rigged sailboats was one of the success stories of the 1980s. The hulls that many thought to be "funny-looking" have now found acceptance".

== Today ==
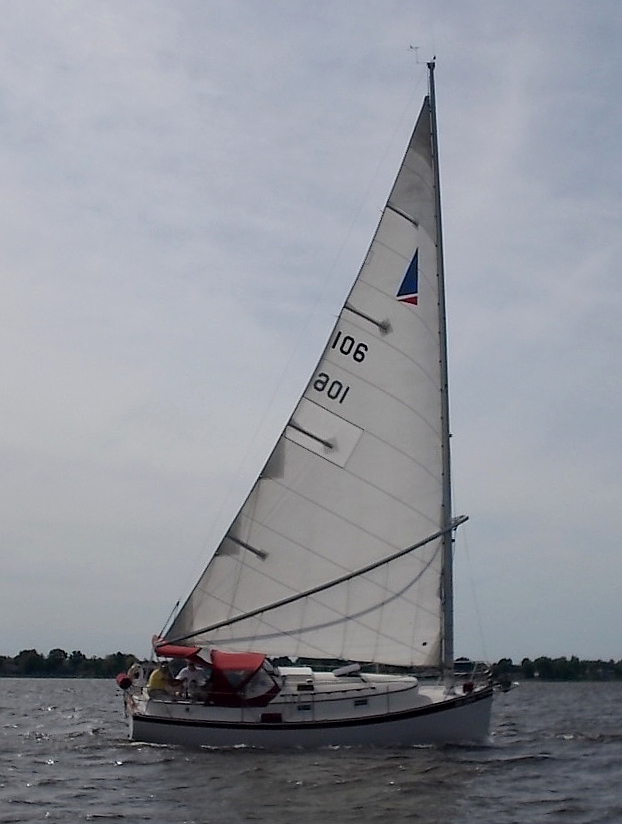
Nonsuch 26

The Nonsuch series of boats are generally considered to be very sturdily built boats. In his review, Paul Howard states that two Nonsuches, David Philpott's "Serenity IV" and Brian Shelley's "Saci IV", were abandoned at sea, found floating months later, and were refurbished and are sailing today.

As of January, 2007, Wiggers Custom Yachts, a Canadian yacht builder located in Bowmanville, Ontario has acquired the molds for the Nonsuch line. Operating under licensing agreements with designer, Wiggers states they will build boats to order. As of October 2009, five Nonsuch 33s have been delivered, with work on another underway.

Regional chapters of the International Nonsuch association (INA) are organized in Canada, the United States, the United Kingdom, and Europe; with the largest fleets on Lake Ontario, and the Eastern U.S. seacoast.

The Nonsuch starts its own class, usually 12-15 boats, in the Spring and Fall Off Soundings race series.

Rendezvous are held every two years, alternating between Canada and the United States. The 2012 Rendezvous was held in Greenport, New York.
