= Freedom 24 =

Sailboat class

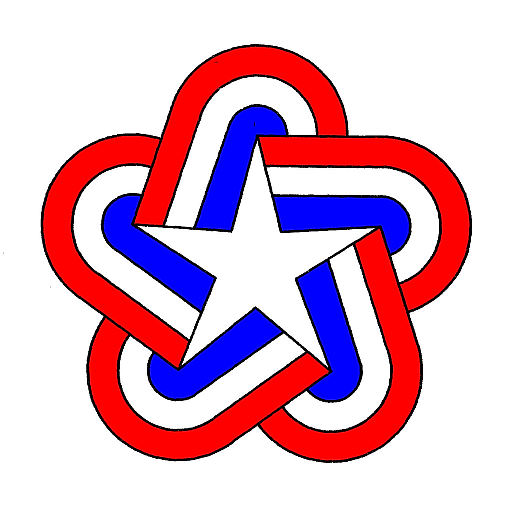

Development
- Designer: William H. Tripp, III
- Location: United States
- Year: 1994
- Builder: Tillotson Pearson for Freedom Yachts
- Role: Racer-Cruiser
- Name: Freedom 24

Boat
- Displacement: 3,250 lb (1,474 kg)
- Draft: 6.00 ft (1.83 m)

Hull
- Type: monohull
- Construction: fiberglass
- LOA: 24.42 ft (7.44 m)
- LWL: 21.50 ft (6.55 m)
- Beam: 8.25 ft (2.51 m)
- Engine: outboard motor

Hull appendages
- Keel: lifting keel
- Ballast: 1,350 lb (612 kg)
- Rudder: transom-mounted rudder

Rig
- Rig type: Bermuda rig

Sails
- Sailplan: fractional rigged sloop
- Total sail area: 303 sq ft (28.1 m^{2})

Racing
- PHRF: 207

The Freedom 24 is an American trailerable sailboat that was designed by William H. Tripp, III as a racer-cruiser and first built in 1994.

== Production ==
The design was built by Tillotson Pearson for Freedom Yachts in the United States from 1994 to 1995, but it is now out of production. McArthur notes, "the number built is unknown but not a big seller."

== Design ==
The Freedom 24 is a recreational keelboat, built predominantly of fiberglass. It has a fractional sloop rig with a freestanding mast. The hull has a slightly raked stem; a reverse transom; a transom-hung, folding rudder controlled by a tiller and a lifting keel with a weighted bulb. It displaces 3,250 lb (1,474 kg) and carries 1,350 lb (612 kg) of ballast.

The boat has a draft of 6.00 ft (1.83 m) with the lifting keel extended and 1.83 ft (0.56 m) with it retracted, allowing operation in shallow water or ground transportation on a trailer.

The boat is normally fitted with a small 4 to 6 hp (3 to 4 kW) outboard motor for docking and maneuvering.

The design has sleeping accommodation for four people, with a double "V"-berth in the bow cabin and two straight settee berths in the main cabin. The galley is located on the starboard side just aft of the bow cabin. The galley is equipped with a two-burner stove and a sink. The head is located opposite the galley, on the port side. Cabin headroom is 55 in (140 cm).

For sailing the design is equipped with a roller reefing, self-tacking jib and an asymmetrical spinnaker flown from an articulating bowsprit. The design has foam flotation and is unsinkable.

The design has a PHRF racing average handicap of 207 and a hull speed of 6.2 kn (11.5 km/h).

== Operational history ==
In a 2010 review Steve Henkel wrote, "Freedom Yachts, a marketer of high quality sailboats, wanted to try selling a fast boat of high quality construction that was easy to trailer, launch, and sail, and with a good measure of comfort below ... Best features: ... the retractable rudder and lifting bulb keel (draft 6' down, 1' 10" up, with an intermediate position of 4' 5" for sailing in shallow water) eases launching from a ramp, given the right trailer and ramp. The finish inside and out is very good quality. Worst features: For the short period this boat was sold, her price was at the top end ... but construction quality is also at or near the top end. Yet for some reason this boat did not sell well. Perhaps it was the small forward V-berth, big enough for kids but not adults, or her speed, indicated by her average PHRF of 207—quite a bit higher than most of her comp[etitor]s."

== See also ==
- List of sailing boat types
