= Freedom 28 =

Sailboat class

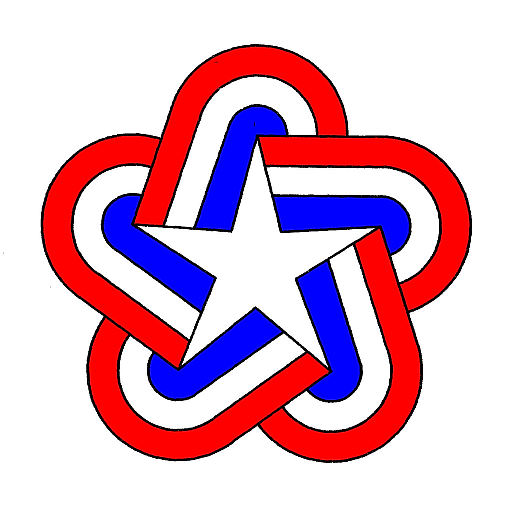

Development
- Designer: Gary Mull
- Location: United States
- Year: 1986
- Builder: Tillotson Pearson Inc (Freedom Yachts)
- Name: Freedom 28

Boat
- Crew: two
- Displacement: 6,370 lb (2,890 kg)
- Draft: 4.50 ft (1.37 m)

Hull
- Construction: Fiberglass
- LOA: 27.5 ft (8.4 m)
- LWL: 23.33 ft (7.11 m)
- Beam: 10.25 ft (3.12 m)

Rig
- General: Free-standing masthead sloop
- I foretriangle height: 25.79 ft (7.86 m)
- J foretriangle base: 9.25 ft (2.82 m)
- P mainsail luff: 34.34 ft (10.47 m)
- E mainsail foot: 12.34 ft (3.76 m)

Sails
- Mainsail area: 211.88 sq ft (19.684 m^{2})
- Jib/genoa area: 119.28 sq ft (11.081 m^{2})
- Total sail area: 331.16 sq ft (30.766 m^{2})

The Freedom 28 (sometimes called the Freedom 27 to disambiguate it from the Freedom 28 Cat Ketch) is an American sailboat, that was designed by Gary Mull and first built in 1986. The design is out of production.

== Production ==
The boat was built by Tillotson Pearson in the United States for Freedom Yachts and first built in 1986.

== Design ==
The Freedom 28 is a small recreational keelboat, built predominantly of fiberglass, with wood trim. It has a free-standing masthead sloop rig, with a "Bierig" jib, an internally-mounted spade-type rudder and a fixed fin keel. It displaces 6,370 lb (2,889 kg) and carries 2,540 lb (1,152 kg) of lead ballast.

The boat is fitted with a Japanese Yanmar 2GMF diesel engine of 13 hp (10 kW).

The design has a hull speed of 6.47 kn (11.98 km/h).

== See also ==
- List of sailing boat types
