= Freedom 36 =

Sailboat class

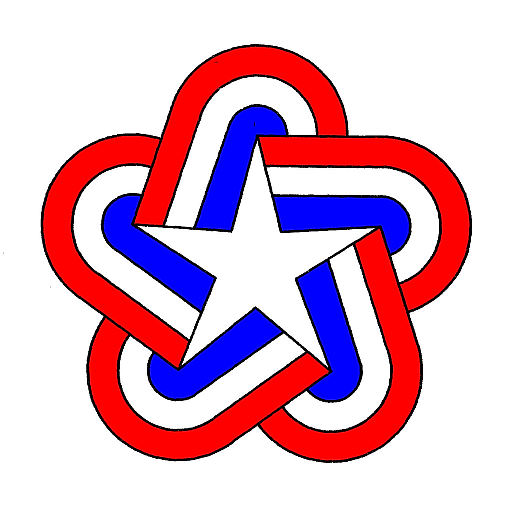

Development
- Designer: Gary Mull
- Location: United States
- Year: 1985
- Builder: Tillotson Pearson Inc (Freedom Yachts)
- Name: Freedom 36

Boat
- Crew: two
- Displacement: 14,370 lb (6,520 kg)
- Draft: 6.00 ft (1.83 m) (with standard keel); 4.5 ft (1.4 m) (with shoal draft keel)

Hull
- Construction: Fiberglass
- LOA: 36.42 ft (11.10 m)
- LWL: 30.58 ft (9.32 m)
- Beam: 12.50 ft (3.81 m)

Rig
- General: Free-standing Fractional rigged sloop
- I foretriangle height: 33.34 ft (10.16 m)
- J foretriangle base: 11.50 ft (3.51 m)
- P mainsail luff: 45.50 ft (13.87 m)
- E mainsail foot: 16.57 ft (5.05 m)

Sails
- Mainsail area: 376.97 sq ft (35.022 m^{2})
- Jib/genoa area: 191.71 sq ft (17.810 m^{2})
- Total sail area: 568.67 sq ft (52.831 m^{2})

Racing
- PHRF: 147 (average)

The Freedom 36 is an American sailboat, that was designed by Gary Mull and first built in 1985. The design is out of production.

== Production ==
The boat was built by Tillotson Pearson in the United States for Freedom Yachts.

== Design ==
The Freedom 36 is a small recreational keelboat, built predominantly of fiberglass, with wood trim. It has a free-standing fractional sloop rig, an internally-mounted spade-type rudder and a fixed fin keel. With the standard keel it displaces 14,370 lb (6,518 kg) and carries 6,500 lb (2,948 kg) of ballast. With the shoal keel it displaces 13,400 lb (6,078 kg).

The boat is fitted with a Japanese Yanmar 3GM diesel engine.

The boat has a PHRF racing average handicap of 147 with a high of 144 and low of 150. It has a hull speed of 7.41 kn (13.72 km/h).

The Freedom 36 design was developed into the Freedom 38 in 1989.

== Variants ==
Freedom 36
Model with standard keel and 6.00 ft (1.83 m) draft. It displaces 14,370 lb (6,518 kg) and carries 6,500 lb (2,948 kg) of ballast.
Freedom 36 SD
Model with shoal draft keel and 4.5 ft (1.4 m) draft. It displaces 13,400 lb (6,078 kg).

== See also ==
- List of sailing boat types
