= Unstayed mast =

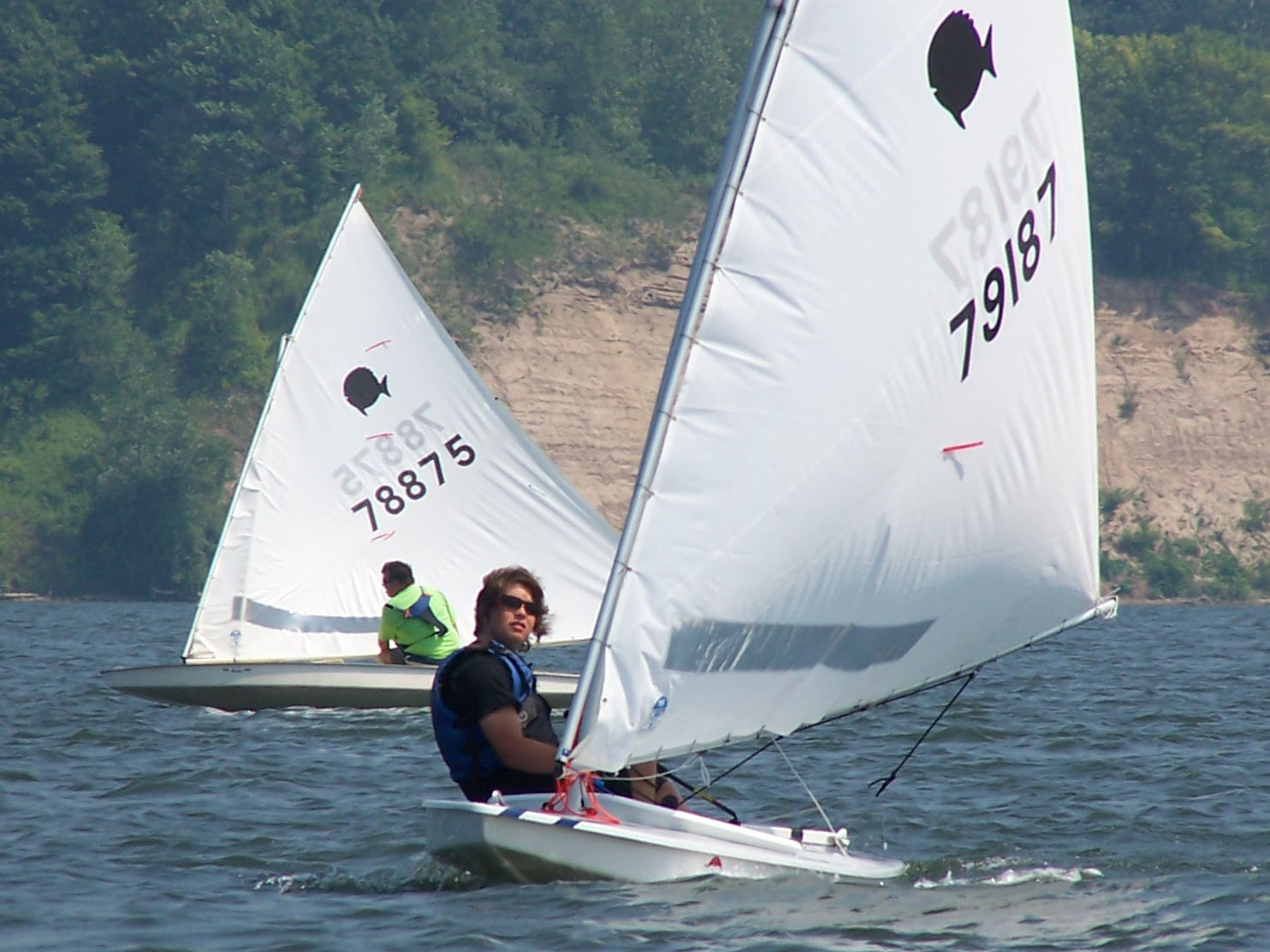
A Sunfish is an example of a popular boat that has an unstayed mast.

An Optimist is another example of an unstayed mast.

An unstayed mast (also known as a freestanding mast) is a type of mast on a boat that is not supported by any stays.

Unstayed masts are often seen with smaller sailing dinghies such as the Optimist, Topper and the Laser, but can also be used on larger vessels. Unstayed masts are found on traditional American catboats, Dutch fishing vessels ranging up to 60 feet, recent schooners in the 70 foot range and the large sailing yacht A. Freedom Yachts and Nonsuch produced a large number of yachts up to 45 feet with unstayed masts. Unstayed masts may provide better aerodynamics but require careful design both as far as the mast itself is concerned and as far as the vessel deck and keel design is concerned. Unstayed masts themselves are often somewhat heavier, which raises the vessel center of gravity. The deck and hull that support the mast need to be specially designed for the installation of an unstayed mast. Remarkably, unstayed masts do reduce hull loads since the standing rigging does not induce compressive loads into the mast and tensile loads in the hull sides in way of the chainplates.

The choice between stayed and unstayed masts is inherently complex and needs to consider all naval architectural design aspects such as cost, weight, center of gravity, material availability, builder's experience, structural design, aerodynamics, human factors, and operational considerations.

== Examples ==
The Junk rig, a type of primarily Chinese ship design and use has historically used unstayed masts.
