= Stays (nautical) =

Standing rigging supporting a mast

1 – mainsail 2 – staysail 3 – spinnaker 4 – hull 5 – keel 6 – rudder 7 – skeg 8 – mast 9 – spreader 10 – shroud 11 – sheet 12 – boom 13 - mast 14 – spinnaker pole 15 – backstay 16 – forestay 17 – boom vang

Stays is a nautical term with various meanings: It can refer to the ropes, wires, or rods on sailing vessels that run fore-and-aft along the centerline from the masts to the hull, deck, bowsprit, or to other masts which serve to stabilize the masts. It can also refer to the action of tacking, or going about; a ship is said to be "in stays" at this time.

== Rigging ==
A stay is part of the standing rigging, (as opposed to a sheet (sailing), which is adjustable), and is used to hold a mast upright.

It is a large, strong rope, wire, or rod extending from the upper end of each mast and running down towards the deck of the vessel in a midships fore-and-aft direction.

The shrouds serve a similar function but extend on each side of the mast and provide support in the athwartship direction. The object of both is to prevent the masts from falling down but the stays also prevent springing, when the ship is pitching deep.

Thus stays are fore and aft. Those led aft towards the vessel's stern are backstays while those that lead forward towards the bow are forestays.

== Tacking ==
Points of sail: the shaded area shows where the vessel would be "in stays".

"To stay" is also a verb: to bring the ship's head up to the wind (to point the bow upwind). This is done in order to go about (to tack; tacking is sometimes also called staying the vessel); the bow of the ship turns upwind, then continues turning until the wind comes over the other side. To miss stays is to fail in the attempt to go about; if the vessel fails to go about, she is said to refuse stays. In stays, or hove in stays, is the situation of a vessel when she is staying, or in the act of going about. A vessel in bad trim, or lubberly handled, is sure to be slack or loose in the stays: she may refuse stays fairly often. A suitable vessel well handled can usually be stayed swiftly, without losing noticeable way (without slowing down), and the sails will go over gently and without fuss or overshooting.

== Types of stays ==
baby or inner-forestay
runs to a point partway up the mast, secured further aft than, and in addition to the main forestay.
forestay or headstay
reaches from the foremast-head towards the bowsprit end.
mainstay
extends to the ship's stem. The mizzenstay stretches to a collar on the main-mast, immediately above the quarterdeck.
fore-topmast stay
goes to the end of the bowsprit, a little beyond the forestay, on which the fore-topmast staysail runs on hanks.
main-topmast stay
attaches to the hounds of the foremast, or comes on deck.
mizzen-topmast stay
goes to the hounds of the main-mast.
top-gallant, royal, or any other masts
have each a stay, named after their respective masts
springstay
is a kind of substitute nearly parallel to the principal stay, and intended to help the principal stay to support its mast
triatic stay
is a stay that runs between masts. On a ketch it runs between the main mast and the head of the mizzen mast and is used to stop the upper section of the mizzen mast being pulled backwards. On a steamer, an iron bar between the two knees secures the paddle-beams. (See funnel stays).

== See also ==
- Chainplate
- Unstayed Mast
