= Waterstart =

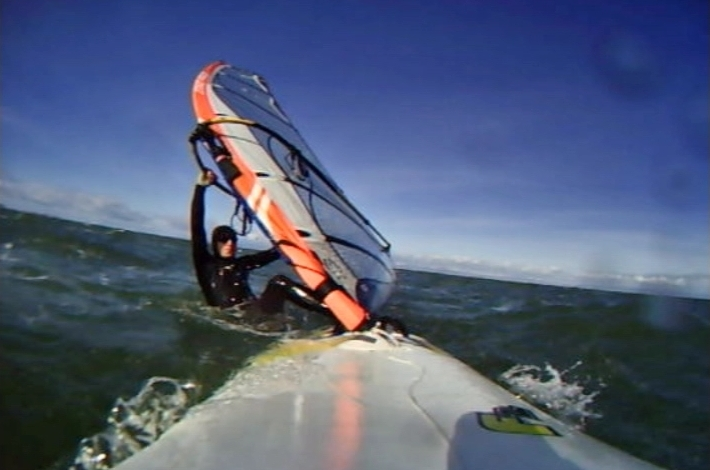
A windsurfer performing a waterstart

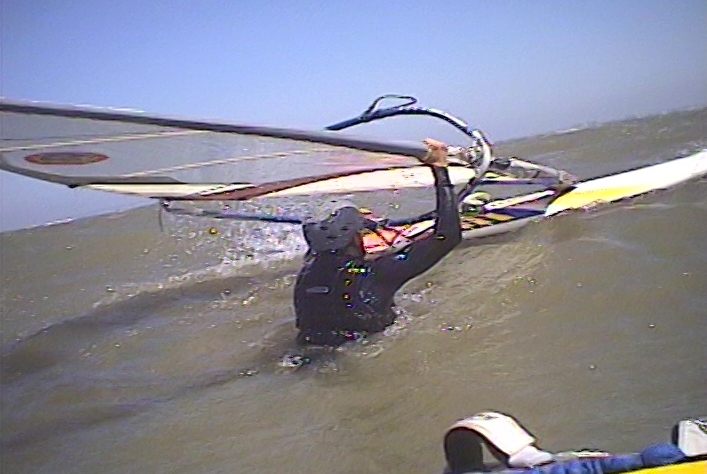
A windsurfing sailor has just flown the rig and is now steering the board towards an optimum direction

A waterstart is a key windsurfing maneuver for recovering after a fall and getting back into sailing position by using wind. It is more efficient than uphauling the sail (standing on the board and lifting it by the rope, or uphaul), but requires a minimum level of wind to perform. Variations of waterstarting include the clew-first waterstart and the light wind waterstart.

== Overview ==
During a waterstart, a sailor clears the sail of water and powers it up in the wind. The powered sail then pulls the sailor out of the water enough so they could step up and onto the board. When the sail is first being lifted, it often helps to push the back of the board slightly underwater, and setting the front of the boom onto the board (near the footstraps). The buoyancy of the board will then push the boom upward, helping to lift the sail out of the water.

Waterstarting is faster and less tiring compared to climbing back on the board and uphauling the sail, but requires enough wind (about 14 knots or more, depending on the skills, weight and agility of the surfer) to perform. Waterstarting requires flying the sail and getting the mast high enough so that the wind will finish in lifting the sailor's weight up and onto the board.

Mastering this technique is imperative when sailing in high winds or in large swell, when uphauling the sail would be difficult or impossible. It is also necessary when sailing on smaller boards, when the board does not have enough buoyancy for the sailor to stand on it with enough stability to uphaul the sail.

Many sailors practice waterstarting in shallow waters, where it is easier to maneuver the board and rig into the correct position. When a beginner sails in windier conditions and falls in deeper water, there will be more opportunity to learn a "deep water" waterstart.

== Variations ==
=== Clew-first waterstart ===
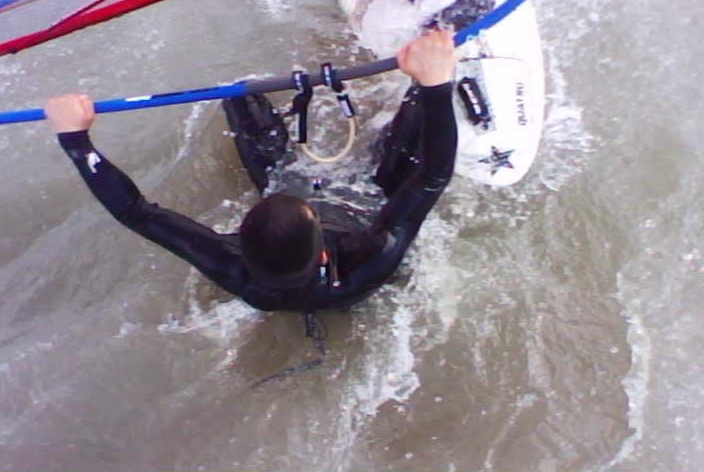
Waterstarting clew-first, note that the mast hand is closer to the tail of the board

A clew-first waterstart is a variation used to start in the opposite direction from the one the board is initially pointing. It is very similar to a standard waterstart. The main difference is that once the sail is flying, the board is on the mast side of the sailor and points a bit further downwind, on a broad reach. The sail is flipped once the sailor is up and on the board.

=== Light wind waterstart ===
Waterstarting in light wind is also possible, but more difficult to perform, and may even require a different technique such as controlling the rig by the foot of the sail and lower part of the mast (i.e. controlling the sail at a point lower than the boom). As such, it is considered an expert-level skill. Experts can waterstart in winds as light as 7-10kt.
