= Freedom Yachts =

American yacht builder, 1976 to 2008

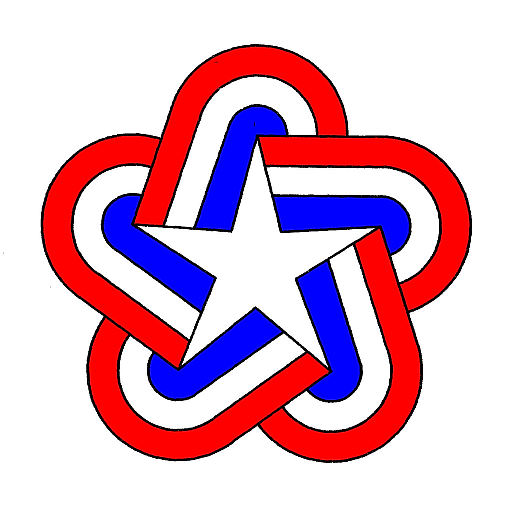
- Industry: Sailboat Builder
- Founded: United States (1976)
- Founder: Garry Hoyt
- Defunct: 2008
- Fate: Defunct
- Headquarters: Rhode Island, United States
- Products: Sailboats

Freedom Yachts was the maker of the Freedom (sail) and Legacy (power) yacht brands. The Freedom sailboats have unstayed rigs, meaning that the mast is freestanding and not supported by the normal set of wires called standing rigging. Garry Hoyt, a champion sailor and noted maverick, created the unstayed rigs to give "freedom" from the inefficient sail shapes of traditional sloop rigs as well as to give "freedom" from the compression and maintenance issues associated with standing rigging. A known issue with this style of mast, however, is that in rough seas it can break loose, causing a potential holing (pounds through the bottom of the hull). This is commonly due to the tangs that hold it in place failing. The masts are made of carbon fiber and are set well forward on the boat. This means most of the sail area is contained in the mainsail. Jib sails can either be overlapping or self-tending.

Gary Hoyt founded Freedom Yachts in 1976 with the Freedom 40. All the boats were built by Tillotson Pearson for Freedom Yachts.

Hoyt sold Freedom Yachts to Tillotson-Pearson in 1985 after some slow years. He used naval architects from the Herreshoff design offices for his early designs and in the early 1980s commissioned a 39 feet pilothouse design from Ron Holland. Tillotson-Pearson brought Gary Mull on board as designer for a new series of great sailing, conventional looking boats. David Pedrick designed for the (again) new owners starting in the mid 1990s after Tillotson-Pearson Composites sold the yacht division off.

== Boats produced ==
Boats produced under company name include:

- Freedom 40 AC - 1976
- Freedom 40 CC - 1976
- Freedom 28 Cat Ketch - 1979
- Freedom 33 - 1979
- Freedom 25 - 1981
- Freedom 35 Cat Ketch - 1981
- Freedom 44 Cat Ketch - 1981
- Freedom 21 - 1982
- Freedom 32 - 1983
- Freedom 39 - 1983
- Freedom 39 PH - 1983
- Freedom 29 - 1984
- Freedom 36 - 1985
- Freedom 36 Cat Ketch - 1985
- Freedom 28 - 1986
- Freedom 30 - 1986
- Freedom 42 - 1987
- Freedom 45 AC - 1987
- Freedom 45 CC - 1987
- Freedom 27 - 1989
- Freedom 38 - 1989
- Freedom 32-2 - 1992
- Freedom 35 - 1993
- Freedom 40/40 - 1993
- Freedom 24 - 1994
- Independence 20 - 1999
