= Freedom 42 =

Sailboat class

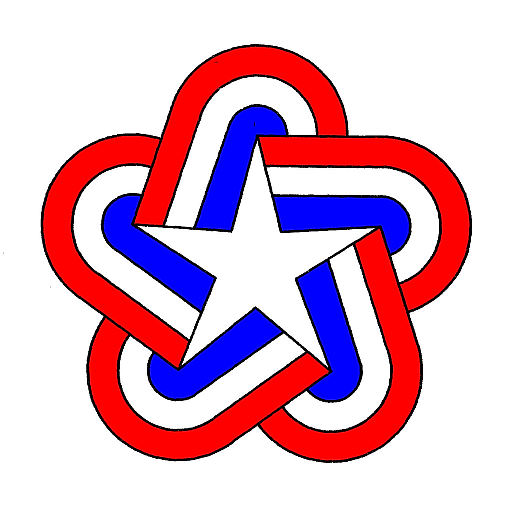

Development
- Designer: Gary Mull
- Location: United States
- Year: 1987
- Builder: Tillotson Pearson Inc (Freedom Yachts)
- Name: Freedom 42

Boat
- Crew: two
- Displacement: 24,000 lb (11,000 kg)
- Draft: 6.00 ft (1.83 m)

Hull
- Construction: Fiberglass
- LOA: 42.00 ft (12.80 m)
- LWL: 39.50 ft (12.04 m)
- Beam: 13.42 ft (4.09 m)

Hull appendages
- Keel: fin keel
- Rudder: internal spade-type

Rig
- General: Fractional rigged sloop
- I foretriangle height: 38.00 ft (11.58 m)
- J foretriangle base: 13.83 ft (4.22 m)
- P mainsail luff: 56.83 ft (17.32 m)
- E mainsail foot: 18.50 ft (5.64 m)

Sails
- Mainsail area: 525.68 sq ft (48.837 m^{2})
- Jib/genoa area: 262.77 sq ft (24.412 m^{2})
- Total sail area: 788.45 sq ft (73.249 m^{2})

Racing
- PHRF: 102 (average)

The Freedom 42 is an American sailboat, that was designed by Gary Mull and first built in 1987. The design is out of production.

== Production ==
The boat was built by Tillotson Pearson in the United States for Freedom Yachts.

== Design ==
The Freedom 42 is a small recreational keelboat, built predominantly of fiberglass, with wood trim. It has a free-standing fractional sloop rig, an internally-mounted spade-type rudder and a fixed fin keel. It displaces 24,000 lb (10,886 kg).

The boat has a PHRF racing average handicap of 102 and a hull speed of 8.42 kn (15.59 km/h).

== See also ==
- List of sailing boat types
