= Pilothouse yacht =

Type of yacht

A pilothouse yacht is designed to allow the crew to maintain a safe and effective watch without needing to be on deck. There must be all-round visibility from within the yacht's accommodation – this allows the crewmember to be able to keep watch comfortably whilst fully protected from the elements.

Most pilothouse yachts have an inside steering position, but it is not essential as long as it takes only a few seconds to reach the cockpit. If there is no proper inside steering position, engine controls maybe located at the chart table, with an autopilot joystick instead of a wheel.

A wheelhouse is a specific type of pilothouse which contains the vessel's main steering position.
