= Cat rigged =

Single masted sailing rig without headsails

A boat or yacht that is cat-rigged has a single mast, stepped well forward, carrying a single fore and aft sail, behind the mast. A boat that is cat-rigged can also be described as having a Una rig.

Laser dinghies are cat-rigged, as are Finn dinghies, Optimists, many Freedom Yachts and many traditional fishing vessels.

Also cat-rigged are catboats, a traditional style of wide-beamed, shallow-draft boat, typically gaff-rigged with a centreboard. Formerly common on the East Coast of the United States they are more commonly seen as dinghy-sized open daysailers and class racers.

The terms cat-rigged, and catboat, should not be confused with catamarans. Catamarans are not related to the term cat-rigged, though catamarans can be cat-rigged, if they have a single sail and no jib.

The term 'cat' may come from the 'cat head', a protruding cross beam, not far behind the bow, or head, of a sailing ship, to which the anchor was attached when the vessel was preparing for sea. The mast of a cat-rigged boat is stepped near the point where the 'cat head' would be.

== See also ==
- Catamaran
- Glossary of nautical terms (disambiguation)
- Ship's cat
