= Boom (windsurfing) =

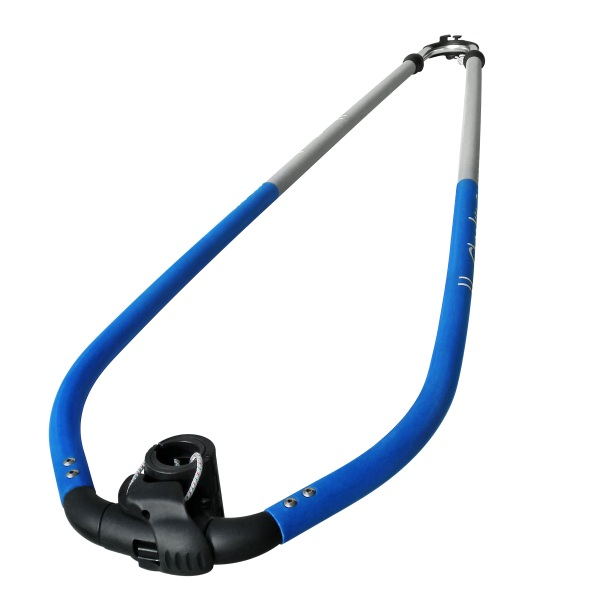
A windsurfing boom.

A boom, in the context of windsurfing, is a piece of equipment that attaches to the mast, providing structural support for the sail. It completely encircles the sail, and is designed to be gripped, allowing the sailor to control the sail for normal sailing, and also for almost any type of maneuver (such as gybing, tacking, and waterstarting). Early pre-RAF/cambered booms (often called a "wishbone boom" due to their symmetrical shape) were tied onto the mast using rope, but newer booms use a clamp mechanism for attachment.

== Application ==
A windsurfer uses the boom to hold and maneuver the rigged sail, either directly gripping it in their hands, or through the use of harness lines. The boom mast attachment is the inhaul, the boom sail attachment (at the opposite end) is the outhaul and there is usually a connection at the boom head to attach an uphaul which is secured to the mast base with an elastic bungee cord allowing the rider the ability to lift the sail out of the water.

When a sailor falls and must recover to a sailing position, the boom is sometimes used in one of the initial steps of performing a waterstart. When the sail is first lifted from the water, it often helps to push the back of the board slightly underwater, and then set the front of the boom onto the board (near the footstraps). The buoyancy of the board will then push the boom upward, helping to lift the sail out of the water.

== Construction ==
The frame of a boom can be constructed from teak, aluminum or carbon fiber. It usually has some type of grip material glued onto its main beams for comfort, control, and to help protect itself, the board, and the sailor during falls. A boom can usually be adjusted in length to accommodate different sized sails, and come in different tube diameters. The front of the boom (where it attaches to the mast) is usually blunt-shaped, and constructed of durable plastic. It may also have some padding or rubberized material to minimize damage in the event it strikes the board or rider during a fall.

== Gallery ==
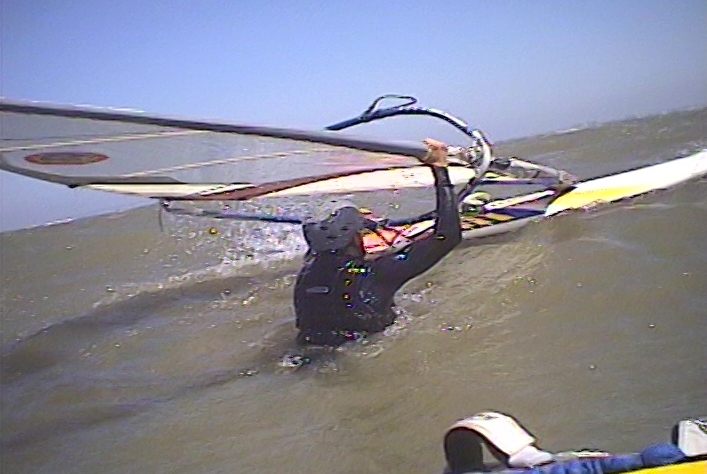
A sailor is controlling the sail with one hand on the boom, and the other on the mast, preparing to waterstart.

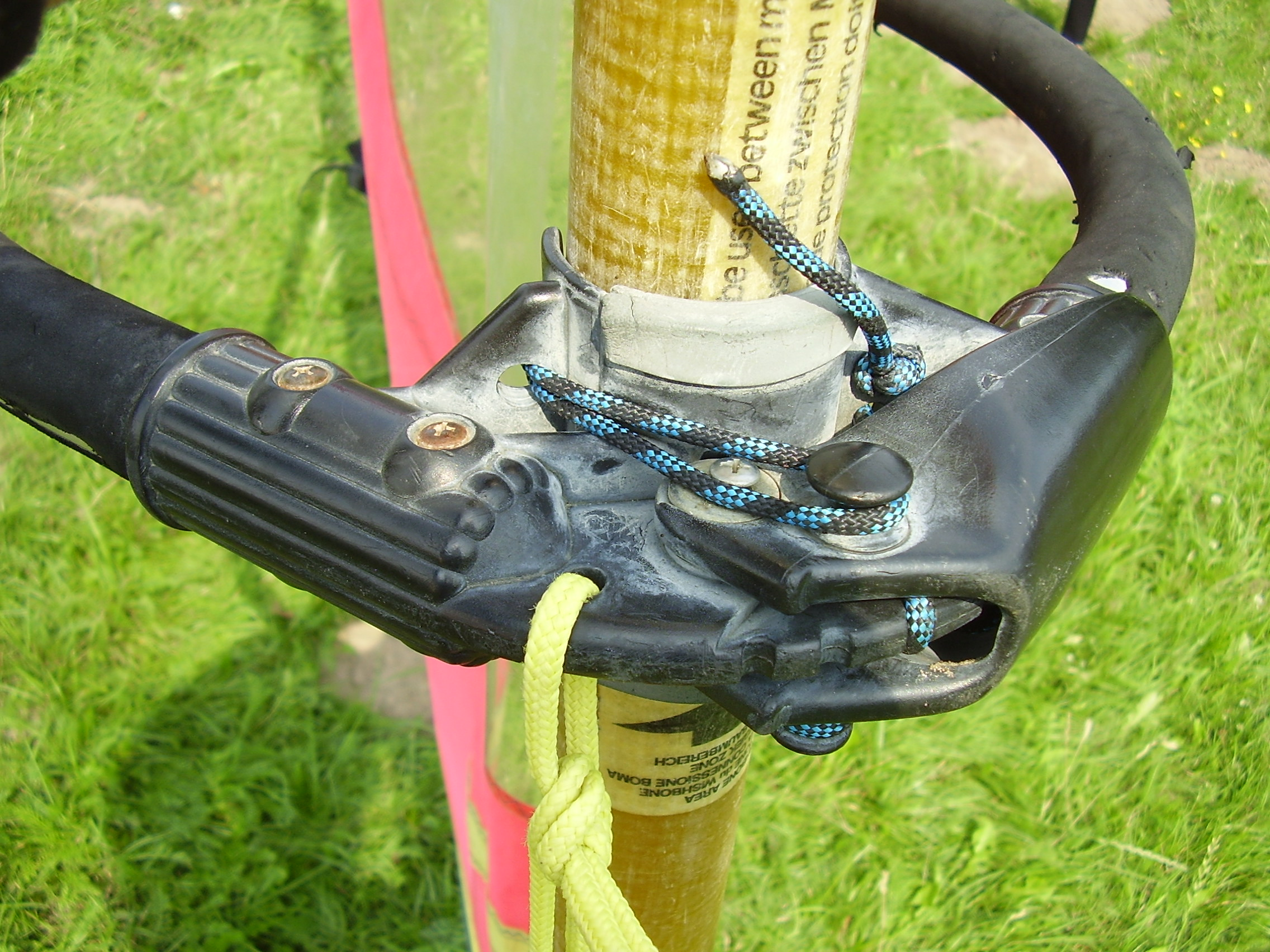
Detail showing boom connection to mast.

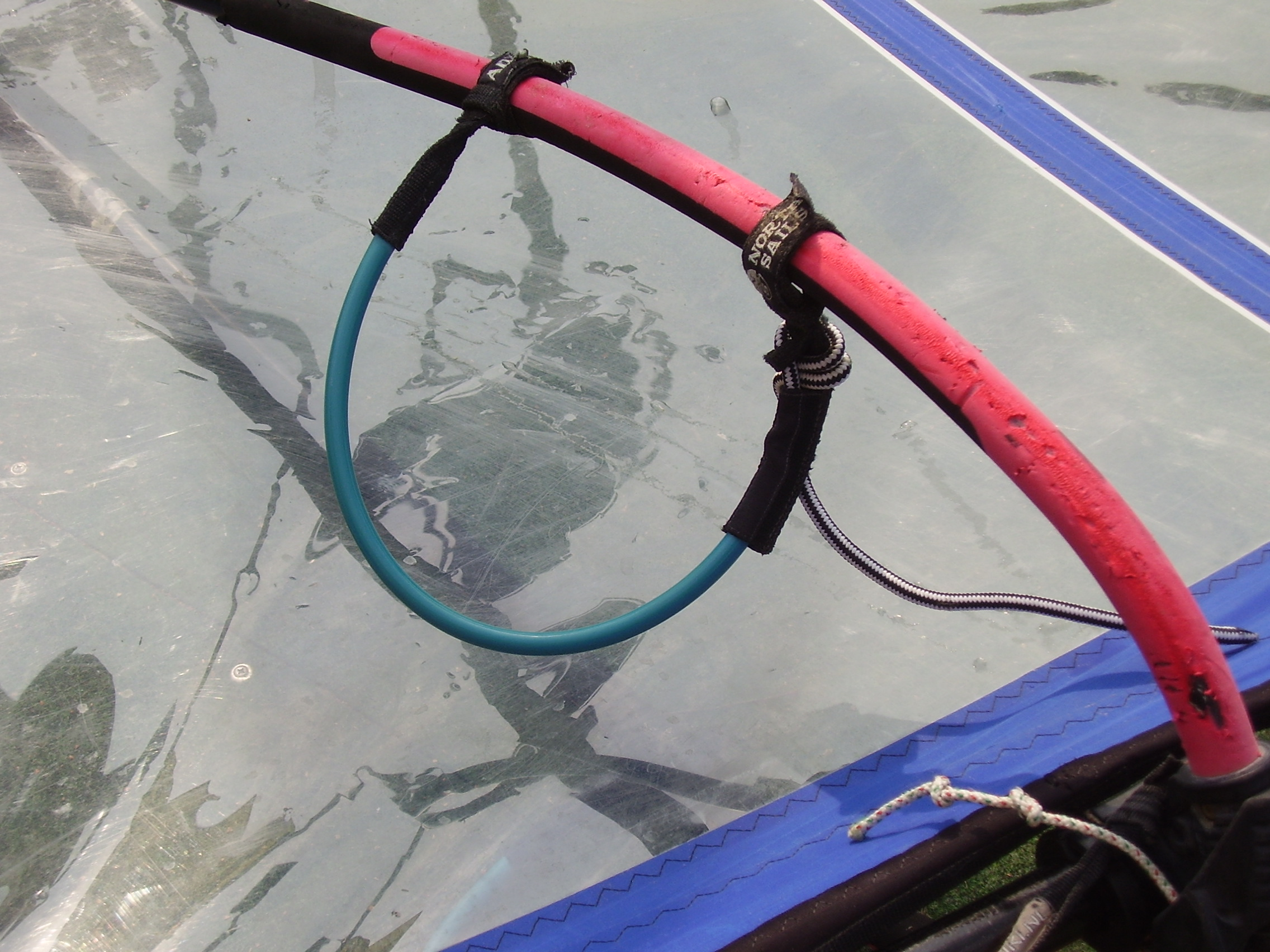
Detail of boom with harness lines (one side visible).

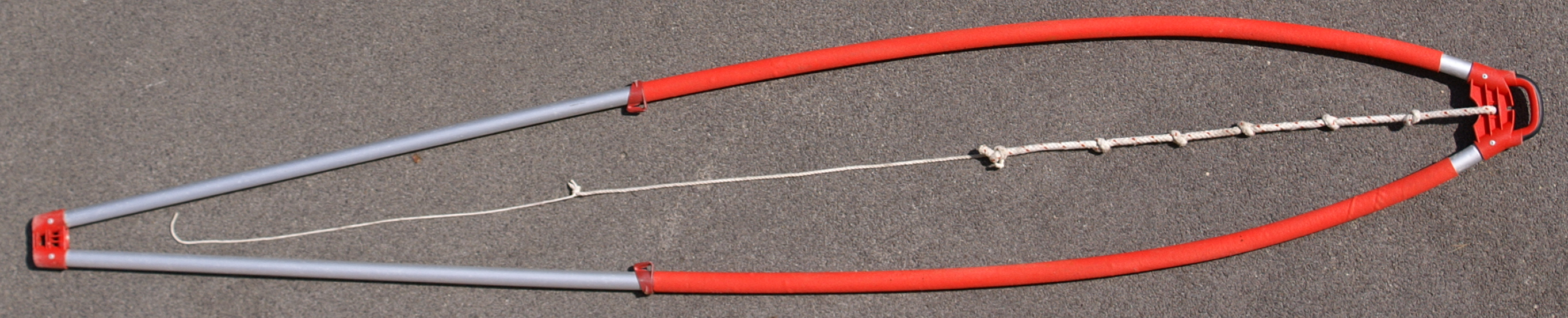
An older model windsurfing boom.
