= The Wilderness =

The Wilderness may refer to:

== Film and television ==
- Badland Hunters, also known as The Wilderness, a 2024 film
- The Wilderness (2025 film), a 2025 American drama film

== Places ==
- The Wilderness (Virginia), a dense forest in Virginia, site of American Civil War battles
  - Battle of the Wilderness, a major 1864 battle occurring there
- The Wilderness (Ohio), and The Wilderness Trail, part of the Edge of Appalachia Preserve in southern Ohio
- The Wilderness (Trappe, Maryland), a historic home at Matthews in Maryland
- The Wilderness (Catonsville, Maryland), a historic home near Catonsville in Maryland
- The Wilderness SSSI, Isle of Wight, a site of special scientific interest on the Isle of Wight

== Novels ==
- The Wilderness (McHenry novel), an historical novel by James McHenry
- The Wilderness (Harvey novel), a 2008 novel by Samantha Harvey
- The Wilderness (Flournoy novel), a 2025 novel by Angela Flournoy
- "The Wilderness" (short story), by Ray Bradbury (1952)
- Wilderness (novel), a 1979 novel by American writer Robert B. Parker

== Music ==
- The Wilderness (Cowboy Junkies album), 2012
- The Wilderness (Explosions in the Sky album), 2016

== Games ==
- The Wilderness Campaign (wargame), a 1972 board wargame simulating a series of battles in Virginia during the American Civil War
- Battle of the Wilderness: Gaining the Initiative, May 5-6, 1864, a 1975 board wargame simulating the American Civil War battle
- The Wilderness (wargame), a 1983 board wargame simulating the American Civil War battle

== Other uses ==
- The Wilderness, a nickname of Willesden Junction station, London

== See also ==
- Wilderness, a natural environment
- Wilderness (disambiguation)
- The Wilderness Society (disambiguation)
