= Wilderness (disambiguation) =

Wilderness is a natural environment on Earth that has not been modified by human action.

Wilderness may also refer to:

== Film and television ==
=== Film ===
- Wilderness (2006 film), a horror movie filmed in Northern Ireland
- Wilderness (2017 film), a Japanese two-part drama film by Yoshiyuki Kishi

=== TV ===
- Wilderness (1996 TV series), a 1996 British drama directed by Ben Bolt
- Wilderness (2023 TV series), a British television series based on the novel by B. E. Jones

== Literature ==
- Wilderness (novel), a 1979 novel by Robert B. Parker
- Wilderness, a 1994 novel by Gerald Hausman and Roger Zelazny
- Wilderness, a 2007 children's book by Roddy Doyle
- Wilderness, a 2013 novella by Dean Koontz, see Dean Koontz bibliography
- Wilderness: The Lost Writings of Jim Morrison (1943–1971), 1998 poetry book by Jim Morrison

== Theater ==
- Ah Wilderness (Aa, Kouya), a 2011 Japanese play, starring Jun Matsumoto, based on Shūji Terayama's novel

== Music ==
- Wilderness (band), a U.S. indie rock band
- Wilderness (Brett Anderson album), 2008
- Wilderness (Sophie B. Hawkins album), 2004
- Wilderness (C. W. McCall album), 1976
- Wilderness (The Features album), 2011
- Wilderness (Wilderness album), 2005
- Wilderness (The Handsome Family album), 2013
- Wilderness, 2015 album by Swedish singer Ola Salo
- "Wilderness", a song by Nick Jonas from 2014's Nick Jonas
- "Wilderness", a song by Sleater-Kinney from their album The Woods
- "Wilderness", a song by Joy Division from their album Unknown Pleasures
- "Wilderness", a song by Bat for Lashes from her album Two Suns
- "Intro – Wilderness", a song by Skylar Grey from Natural Causes

== Other media ==
- Wilderness: A Survival Adventure, a computer game released in 1986, developed by Titan Computer Products and published by Electric Transit
- Wilderness (manga), a manga by Akihiro Ito

== Ships and Boats ==
- Wilderness 38, an American sailboat design
- Wilderness 40, an American sailboat design
- USS Wilderness, a former United States Navy steamship and later revenue cutter

== Places ==
- Wilderness, Missouri, a community in the United States
- Wilderness, Western Cape, a small town in South Africa
- Wilderness School, a private girls' school in Adelaide, South Australia
- Wilderness Territory, a resort in Wisconsin Dells, WI

== Other uses ==
- IUCN Protected Area Management Categories
- National Wilderness Preservation System of the United States (Created by the Wilderness Act of 1964)
- Wilderness (garden history), formal garden features, mostly before 1750
- Wilderness therapy, a form of intense behavioral modification therapy

== See also ==
- Ah Wilderness (Aa, Kouya) a 1966 novel by Shūji Terayama
- The Wilderness (disambiguation)
- Wilderland (a fictional location)
