= James McHenry (disambiguation) =

James McHenry (1753–1816) was an American military surgeon and statesman.

James McHenry may also refer to:

- James McHenry (novelist) (1785–1845), American writer, physician, and diplomat
- James W. McHenry (1864–1931), American mayor
- James McHenry (lawyer), U.S. Department of Justice official

== See also ==
- James McHenry Jones (1859–1909), American educator, school administrator, businessperson, and minister
