= Vessel States =

Studio album by Wilderness
- Released: April 11, 2006
- Recorded: Fall of 2005
- Genre: Art rock
- Label: Jagjaguwar JAG093
- Producer: Chad Clark and T.J. Lipple

Wilderness chronology
Wilderness (2005)	Vessel States (2006)	(k)no(w)here (2008)

Professional ratings
Aggregate scores
Source	Rating
Metacritic	76/100
Review scores
Source	Rating
AllMusic	3.5/5 stars
Pitchfork Media	7.5/10

Vessel States is the second studio album by Baltimore band Wilderness. It was recorded, mixed and mastered in the fall of 2005, by Chad Clark and T.J. Lipple at Silver Sonya in Arlington, Virginia.

== Track listing ==
1. "The Blood Is on the Wall"
2. "Beautiful Alarms"
3. "Emergency"
4. "Last"
5. "Fever Pitch"
6. "Death Verses"
7. "Towered"
8. "Gravity Bent Light"
9. "Monumental"
