= The Wilderness (McHenry novel) =

1823 historical novel by James McHenry

The Wilderness, or the Youthful Days of Washington
- Author: James McHenry
- Language: English
- Genre: Novel
- Publisher: E. Bliss & E. White
- Publication date: 1823
- Publication place: United States
- Media type: Print (Hardback)
- Pages: 229, 292 pp (in two volumes)
- OCLC: 2198231

The Wilderness; or, Braddock's Times: A Tale of the West is an historical novel by the Irish-American writer James McHenry (1784–1845) first published by Bliss & White in New York in 1823. It was republished in London that same year with the title The Wilderness, or The Youthful Days of Washington. McHenry used the pseudonym ‘Solomon Secondsight’.

The novel is set in 1750s Pittsburgh, Pennsylvania.

The novel tells the story of an Irish family from Ulster on the frontier of the American West at colonial Pittsburgh. In a subplot, George Washington, who is passing through on his historic mission, falls in love with a pioneer maiden named Maria, who refuses him, and therefore he dedicates himself thereafter to the service of his country.

The Wilderness is the first American novel set entirely in Pittsburgh and Western Pennsylvania.
