= Wilderness (Wilderness album) =

Studio album by Wilderness
- Released: July 5, 2005
- Recorded: May 2004–June 2004
- Genre: Art rock
- Label: Jagjaguwar JAG088
- Producer: Chad Clark and T.J. Lipple

Wilderness chronology
Wilderness (2005)	Vessel States (2006)

Professional ratings
Aggregate scores
Source	Rating
Metacritic	81/100
Review scores
Source	Rating
Allmusic	4/5 stars
Pitchfork Media	(8.5/10)
PopMatters	8/10

Wilderness is the debut studio album by the art rock band Wilderness. It was recorded, mixed and mastered in May and June 2004 by Chad Clark and T.J. Lipple at Silver Sonya in Arlington, Virginia.

== Track listing ==
1. "Marginal Over"
2. "Arkless"
3. "It's All the Same"
4. "End Of Freedom"
5. "Post Plethoric Rhetoric"
6. "Fly Further To See"
7. "Your Hands"
8. "Shepherd in Sheeps Clothing"
9. "Say Can You See"
10. "Mirrored Palm"
