= The Wilderness (Virginia) =

Densely forested region in Virginia, US

Coordinates: 38°19′30″N 77°43′34″W

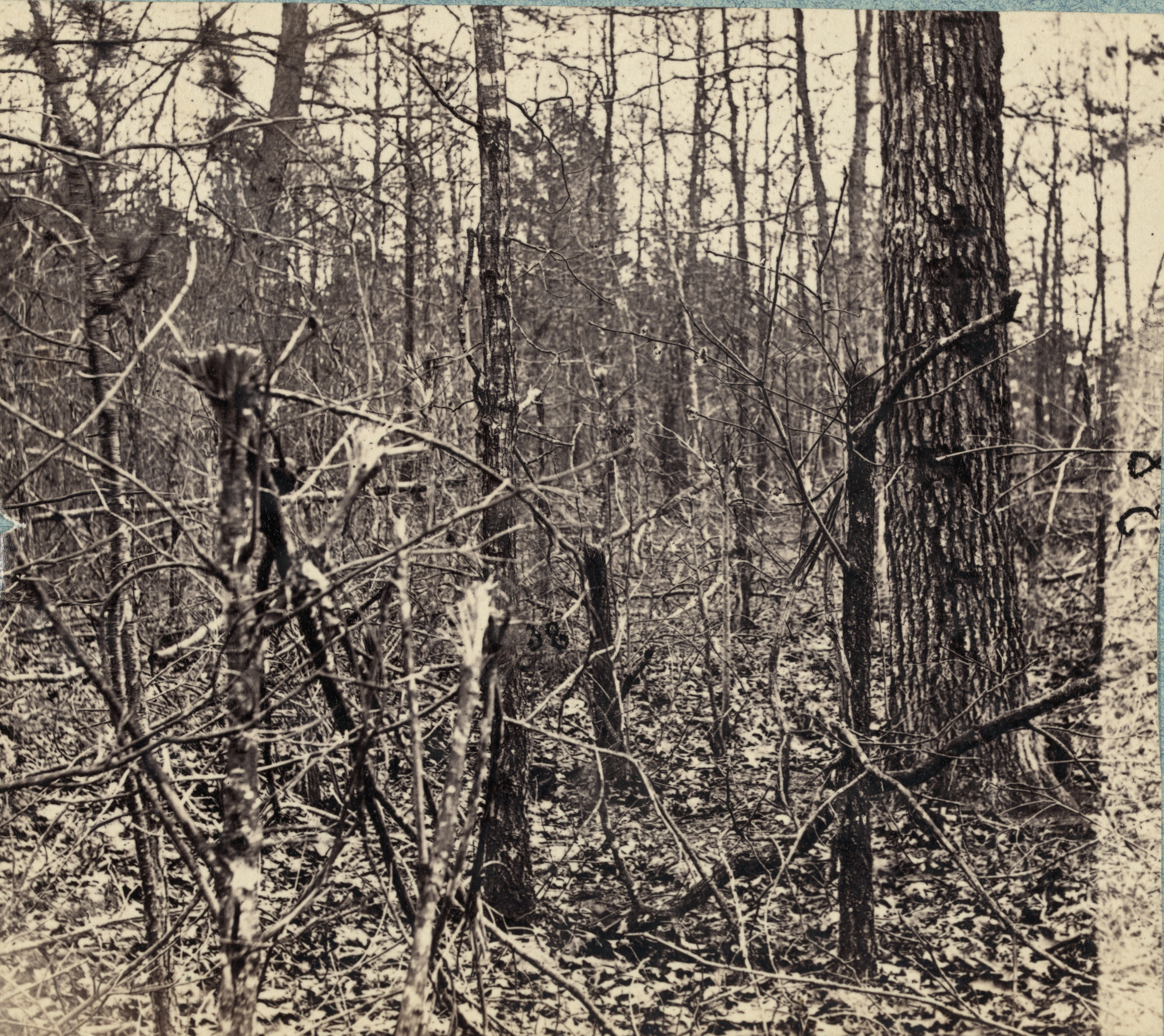
Portion of Wilderness battlefield photographed in 1865

The Wilderness is a densely forested region in the eastern United States in Virginia that covers parts of Orange and Spotsylvania counties; Chancellorsville is located here, west of Fredericksburg.

== Location and description ==
The Wilderness is located south of the Rapidan River and along the Rappahannock River for fourteen miles (23 km), and then about eight or ten miles (13 or 16 km) to the south. Its southern border is Spotsylvania Court House, and the western border is usually considered the Rapidan River tributary Mine Run. The eastern border is less definite, causing estimates of the size of the Wilderness to vary. While the maximum area for the Wilderness is 132 to 156 square miles (340 to 400 km^{2}), historians discussing the battles fought there typically use seventy square miles (180 km^{2}).

The area's original forest had been cleared of its trees at first for tobacco cultivation, which was abandoned once the soil was exhausted. Small trees and shrubs then reclaimed the land. Next, smaller portions of the forest were again cut down as fuel for mining industries, and then again abandoned. In 1732, William Byrd described land near an iron mine in what became known as the Wilderness as "exceeding barren, and the growth of trees upon it hardly big enough for coaling".

In the early 19th century, trees were again cut down for use as charcoal to fuel the iron furnaces in the region. In the 1850s, a small portion of the forest was used as material for building plank roads. This created newer sections of second-growth forest, a dense mix of briars, underbrush, and pine, cedar and hardwood trees with low branches. By the time of the American Civil War (1861-1865) this had created a "patchwork of open areas and vegetation of varying density", an expanse that was difficult to navigate through. One historian described the area as "[T]he evil-looking, evil-smelling Wilderness, where gnarled vine-throttled trees grew out of the marshy underbrush, so close together that the entire landscape was swathed in a perpetual dusk ... a benighted countryside ... with its nearly impenetrable thickets, haphazardly running streams, quicksand-spotted bogs, and intermittent, narrow roads..."

== American Civil War ==
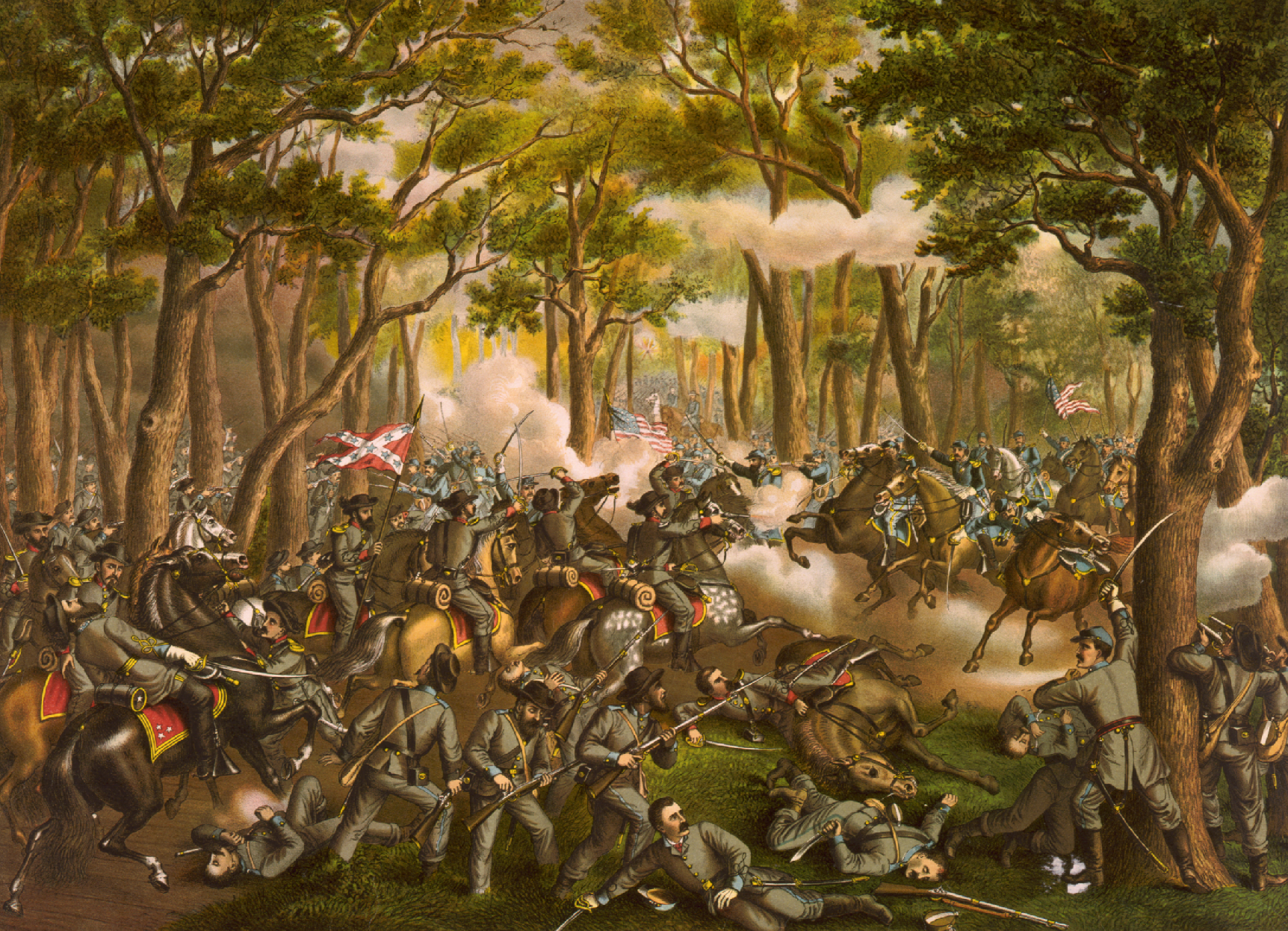
Battle of the Wilderness – Desperate fight on the Orange C.H. Plank Road, near Todd's Tavern, May 6th, 1864 by Kurz and Allison (1888)

The Battle of the Wilderness was fought in 1864 during the American Civil War, as part of Union General Ulysses S. Grant's Overland Campaign. Both Union and Confederate armies had difficulty maneuvering and using their artillery and cavalry because of the density of the forest. Since clearings were scarce, and the region had only a few narrow winding roads, mounted cavalry fighting was nearly impossible. The dense woods, often filled with smoke when the woods caught on fire, made it difficult to see enemy soldiers; the thick choking smoke of the burning woods also caused the respiratory death of many soldiers. The lessened visibility put attackers at a disadvantage, as soldiers often fired at sounds instead of visual cues. Infantry units had difficulty keeping alignment, and often became lost or were involved in friendly-fire incidents. The Confederates had a better knowledge of the terrain, and it somewhat diminished the Union advantage of greater manpower. Grant was aware of how the Wilderness made his advantages in size and artillery less effective, and he preferred to move his army further south to fight Lee on open ground.

A year earlier, the Wilderness played a role in the opening of the Battle of Chancellorsville on May 1, 1863, when Confederate General Thomas J. "Stonewall" Jackson negated the superior numbers of Union General Joseph "Fighting Joe" Hooker by pushing him back into the Wilderness where he could not easily maneuver and bring his strength to bear. Hooker did not reply to Jackson's action by attacking to push Jackson back, getting his forces out into the open. Instead, his confidence shattered, he retreated further into the Wilderness to Chancellorsville.
