= The Wilderness Society =

The Wilderness Society may refer to:

- The Wilderness Society (Australia), an Australian not-for-profit non-governmental organisation that fights environmental issues
- The Wilderness Society (United States), a not-for-profit organization in the United States that advocates for the protection of U.S. public lands
