= Wilderness (band) =

American indie rock band

Wilderness is an American, Baltimore-based indie rock, band currently signed to Jagjaguwar. Led by the theatrical, chant-like vocal style and lyrical presence of James Johnson, they are known to create a complex brand of post-punk that heavily recalls mantra-punk pioneers Lungfish and more closely Public Image Limited. Their debut full-length was recorded, mixed and mastered in May and June 2004, by Chad Clark and T.J. Lipple at Silver Sonya in Arlington, Virginia. It was released in July 2005 and has been widely celebrated in indie music circles. The band performed at North East Sticks Together in September of that year.

On April 11, 2006, the band released their second album, Vessel States, which received mixed critiques in comparison to their debut.

On November 4, 2008, the band released their third album, (k)no(w)here.

== Discography ==
=== Albums ===
- 2005: Wilderness (Jagjaguwar)
- 2006: Vessel States (Jagjaguwar)
- 2008: (k)no(w)here (Jagjaguwar)

=== Singles ===
- 2006: "Living Through / Part Ways EP" (Jagjaguwar)
