= James McHenry (novelist) =

American novelist

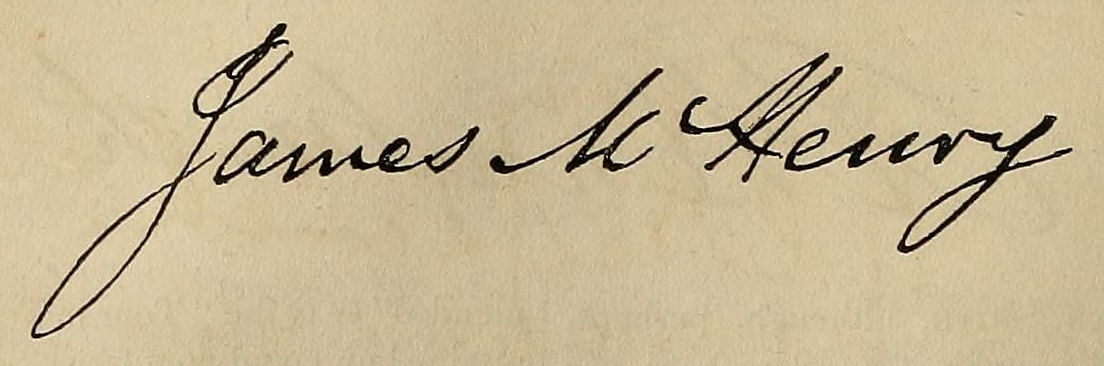
James McHenry’s signature reproduced in Graham’s Magazine, 1842

James McHenry (December 20, 1785 – July 21, 1845) was an Irish-American writer, medical doctor, and diplomat.

== Biography ==
He was born at Larne, Ireland and was educated in Dublin and Glasgow. He studied theology and medicine and practised as a doctor in Larne.

He published his first book of poetry in 1808 and married in 1811.

In 1817 he emigrated to the United States and lived in Baltimore and Pennsylvania, where he practiced medicine and continued to write. The family settled in Philadelphia in 1823.

He published under his own name, and as ‘Solomon Secondsight’; he wrote popular novels as well as poetry, reviews, and a play. He also edited the American Monthly Magazine.

In 1825, he and his wife opened a shop which sold Irish fabrics, such as linen and silk.

On 28 October 1828, he became a nationalised citizen of the United States. He was involved in politics and supported Andrew Jackson on his first presidential campaign, but campaigned against his re-election. He was appointed in 1842 as United States counsel at Derry, and he returned to Ireland in this role.

He died at Larne, on 21 July 1845. He is buried at St. Cedma’s graveyard, Larne.

== Family ==
In 1811 he married Jane Robinson and they had five children.

His son James, who died in 1891 at Kensington, was a well-known financier. His daughter Mary married Mr. J. Bellargee Cox of Philadelphia.

A historical plaque was unveiled in Larne in 2023.

== Works ==
- 1808. The Bard of Erin and Other Poems Mostly National.
- 1810. Patrick: A Poetical Tale Founded on Incidents Which Took Place in Ireland During the Unhappy Period of 1793.
- 1822. The Pleasures of Friendship: A Poem in Two Parts.
- 1823. Waltham: An American Revolutionary Tale in Three Cantos.
- 1823. The Wilderness; or, Braddock's Times: A Tale of the West. (as Solomon Secondsight)
- 1823. The Spectre of the Forest; or, Annals of the Housatonic, A New-England Romance. (as Solomon Secondsight)
- 1824. O'Halloran; or, the Insurgent Chief: An Irish Historical Tale of 1798.
- 1825. The Hearts of Steel: An Irish Historical Tale of the Last Century.
- 1829. The Usurper: An Historical Tragedy in Five Acts.
- 1830. The Betrothed of Wyoming: An Historical Tale.
- 1831. Meredith; or, The Mystery of the Meschianza: A Tale of the American Revolution.
- 1839. To Britannia.
- 1839. The Antediluvians; or, The World Destroyed: A Narrative Poem in Ten Books.
