= Battle of the Wilderness =

Major battle of the American Civil War

- Part of the American Civil War
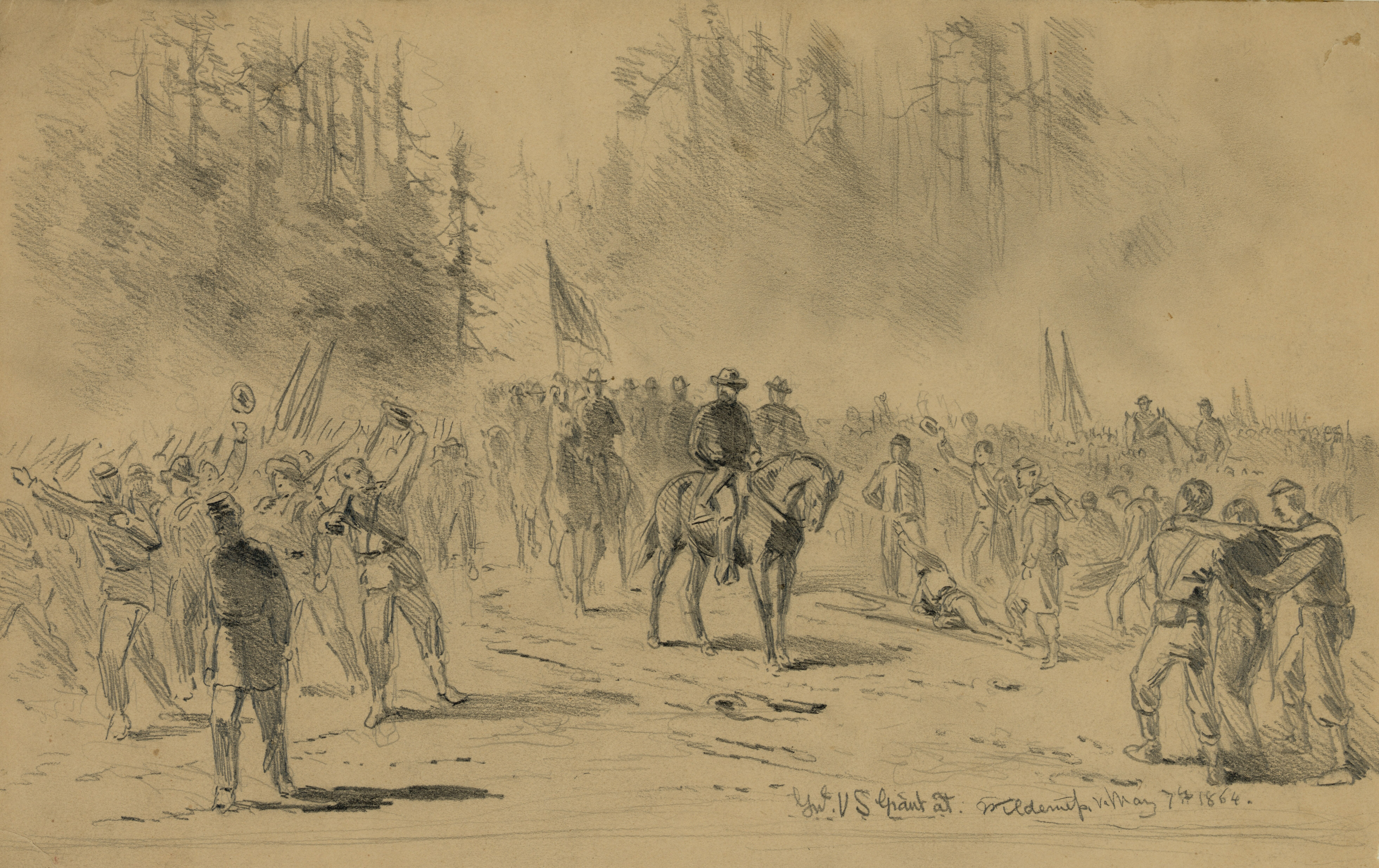
- Grant being cheered by his men after the battle
Date	May 5–7, 1864
Location	Spotsylvania County and Orange County, Virginia 38°19′3″N 77°45′23″W
Result	Inconclusive

Belligerents
United States (Union)	Confederate States

Commanders and leaders
Ulysses S. Grant; George G. Meade; Winfield S. Hancock; Gouverneur K. Warren; John Sedgwick; Philip Sheridan; Ambrose E. Burnside	Robert E. Lee; James Longstreet (WIA); Richard S. Ewell; A. P. Hill; J. E. B. Stuart

Units involved
Army of the Potomac; II Corps; V Corps; VI Corps; Cavalry Corps; IX Corps (not part of AoP)	Army of Northern Virginia; First Corps; Second Corps; Third Corps; Cavalry Corps

Strength
118,700	66,140

Casualties and losses
17,666: 2,246 killed; 12,037 wounded; 3,383 captured/missing	11,033: 1,477 killed; 7,866 wounded; 1,690 captured/missing

The Battle of the Wilderness was fought on May 5–7, 1864, during the American Civil War. It was the first battle of Lieutenant General Ulysses S. Grant's 1864 Virginia Overland Campaign against General Robert E. Lee and the Confederate Army of Northern Virginia. The fighting occurred in a wooded area near Locust Grove, Virginia, about 20 miles (32 km) west of Fredericksburg. Both armies suffered many casualties, nearly 29,000 in total, a harbinger of a war of attrition by Grant against Lee's army and eventually against the Confederate capital, Richmond, Virginia. The battle was tactically inconclusive, as Grant disengaged and then continued his offensive.

Grant attempted to move quickly through the dense underbrush of the Wilderness of Spotsylvania, but Lee launched two of his corps on parallel roads to intercept him. On the morning of May 5, the Union V Corps under Major General Gouverneur K. Warren attacked the Confederate Second Corps, commanded by Lieutenant General Richard S. Ewell, on the Orange Turnpike. That afternoon the Third Corps, commanded by Lieutenant General A. P. Hill, encountered Brigadier General George W. Getty's division (VI Corps) and Major General Winfield S. Hancock's Union II Corps on the Orange Plank Road. Fighting, which ended for the evening because of darkness, was fierce but inconclusive as both sides attempted to maneuver in the dense woods.

At dawn on May 6, Hancock attacked along the Plank Road, driving Hill's corps back in confusion, but the First Corps of Lieutenant General James Longstreet arrived in time to prevent the collapse of the Confederate right flank. Longstreet followed up with a surprise flanking attack from an unfinished railroad bed that drove Hancock's men back, but the momentum was lost when Longstreet was wounded by his own men. An evening attack by Brigadier General John B. Gordon against the Union right flank caused consternation at the Union headquarters, but the lines stabilized and fighting ceased. On May 7, Grant disengaged and moved to the southeast, intending to leave the Wilderness to interpose his army between Lee and Richmond, leading to the Battle of Todd's Tavern and Battle of Spotsylvania Court House.

== Background ==
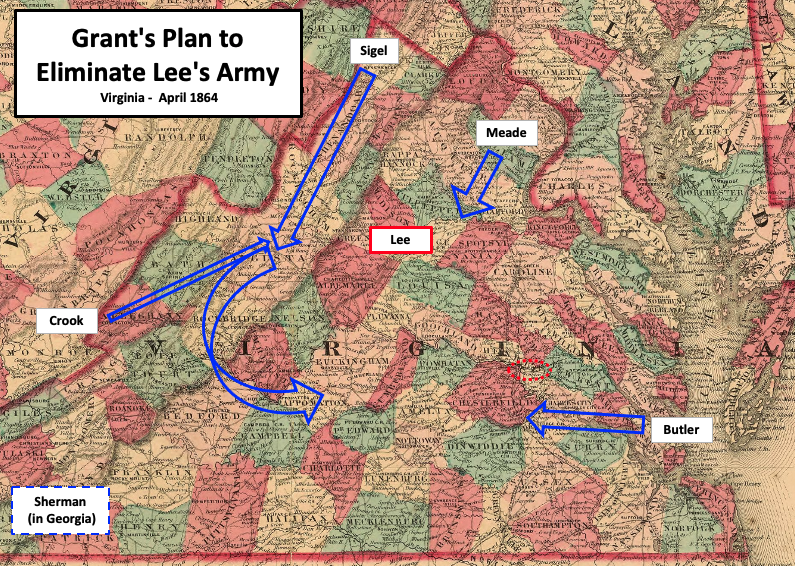
Grant planned to surround Lee's army and cut off its sources of supplies.

In the three years since fighting in the American Civil War began in 1861, the United States Army (a.k.a. the Union Army) made little progress against the Confederate Army in the Eastern Theater. The Union Army's most impressive successes came in the Western Theater, especially at the Battle of Vicksburg where nearly 30,000 Confederates surrendered. President Abraham Lincoln wanted a military leader who would fight. In March 1864, Major General Ulysses S. Grant was summoned from the Western Theater, promoted to lieutenant general, and given command of all the Union armies. Grant was the Union commander at Vicksburg, and also had major victories at Fort Henry, Fort Donelson, Shiloh, and Chattanooga. He chose to make his headquarters with the Army of the Potomac, although Major General George Meade retained formal command of that army. Major General William Tecumseh Sherman succeeded Grant in command of most of the western armies.

Grant believed that the eastern and western Union armies were too uncoordinated in their actions, and that the previous practice of conquering and guarding new territories required too many resources. Grant's new strategy was to attack with all forces at the same time, making it difficult for the Confederates to transfer forces from one battlefront to another. His objective was to destroy the Confederate armies rather than conquering territory. The two largest Confederate armies became the two major targets, and they were General Robert E. Lee's Army of Northern Virginia and General Joseph E. Johnston's Army of Tennessee. This new strategy pleased President Lincoln.

Grant considered Lee's army "the strongest, best appointed and most confident Army in the South." Lee was a professional soldier who fought in the Mexican–American War. At the beginning of the American Civil War, he rejected an offer to be commander of the United States Army. He was considered a master tactician in individual battles, and had the advantage of fighting mostly on familiar (Virginia) territory. Although the Confederate Army had fewer resources and men than the Union Army, Lee made good use of railroads to move his forces from one front to another. By the time Grant appeared in the Eastern Theater, the Confederate soldiers knew that his six predecessors all failed against Lee, and believed that Grant's successes in the Western Theater were against inferior opponents.

=== Grant's plan ===
Grant's plan for Meade's Army of the Potomac was to move south to confront Lee's army between the Union and Confederate capital cities, Washington and Richmond. At the same time, General Benjamin Butler's Army of the James would approach Richmond, Petersburg, and Lee from the southeast near the James River. Major General Franz Sigel's Army of the Shenandoah would move through the Shenandoah Valley and destroy the rail line, agricultural infrastructure, and granaries used to feed the Confederate armies. Brigadier generals George Crook and William W. Averell would attack the Virginia and Tennessee Railroad, and salt and lead mines, in western Virginia before moving east to join Sigel. Sherman would attack Georgia with the similar goal of destroying rail lines, resources, and infrastructure used to equip and feed the Confederate armies. (Note: Grant's plan was not solely focused on the Army of Northern Virginia. Johnston's Army of Tennessee was a target for Sherman in Georgia. Major General Nathaniel P. Banks would fight for the Union in the west where Grant hoped he could capture the important Gulf of Mexico port at Mobile, Alabama.)

Grant's campaign objective of the destruction of Lee's army coincided with the preferences of both Lincoln and his military chief of staff, Henry Halleck. Grant instructed Meade, "Lee's army will be your objective point. Wherever Lee goes, there you will go also." Although he hoped for a quick, decisive battle, Grant was prepared to fight a war of attrition. Both the Union and Confederate casualties could be high, but the Union had greater resources to replace lost soldiers and equipment. By May 2, Grant had four corps positioned to begin Meade's portion of Grant's plan against Lee's army. Three of the corps, plus cavalry, composed Meade's Army of the Potomac. A fourth corps, reporting directly to Grant, added additional firepower. The Rapidan River divided the two foes. A few days later, Grant and Meade would cross the river and begin what became known as the Overland Campaign, and the Battle of the Wilderness was its first battle. (Note: The other armies that were part of Grant's plan had mixed results. Sigel was defeated at the Battle of New Market on May 15. Sherman won the Battle of Atlanta on July 22. He continued his destruction of Confederate infrastructure in November in what became known as Sherman's March to the Sea. Butler's Bermuda Hundred campaign along the James River near Richmond was a failure, although his forces would eventually be used in the Siege of Petersburg, which lasted from June until late March 1865. Major General Philip Sheridan, with Crook and Averell as part of his army, would eventually inflict damage on the Shenandoah Valley with victories at Winchester, Fisher's Hill, and Cedar Creek—occurring in September and October 1864. Johnston's Army of Tennessee surrendered to Sherman in North Carolina on April 26, 1865.)

== Opposing forces ==
=== Union ===
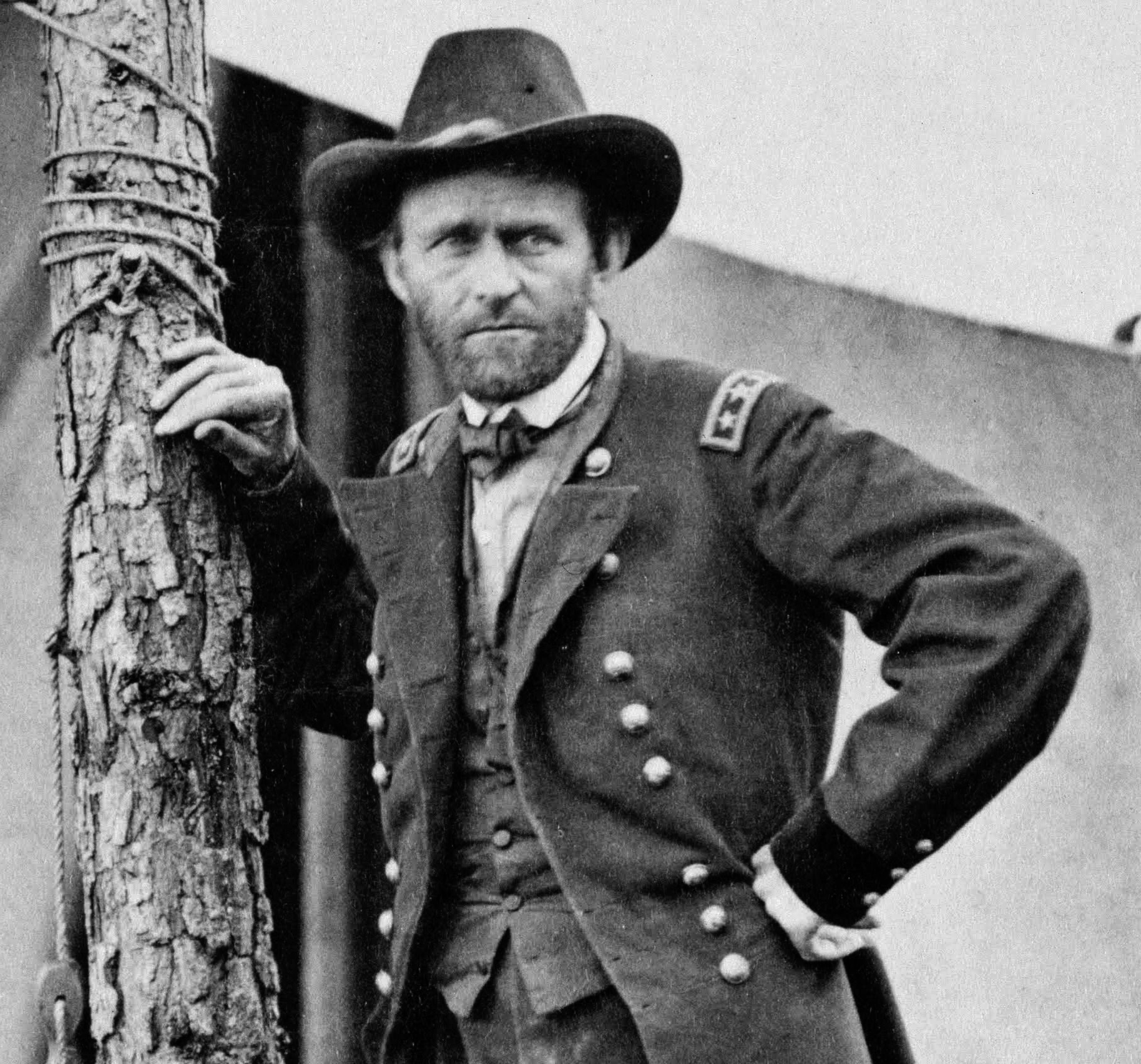
Lt Gen U. S. Grant

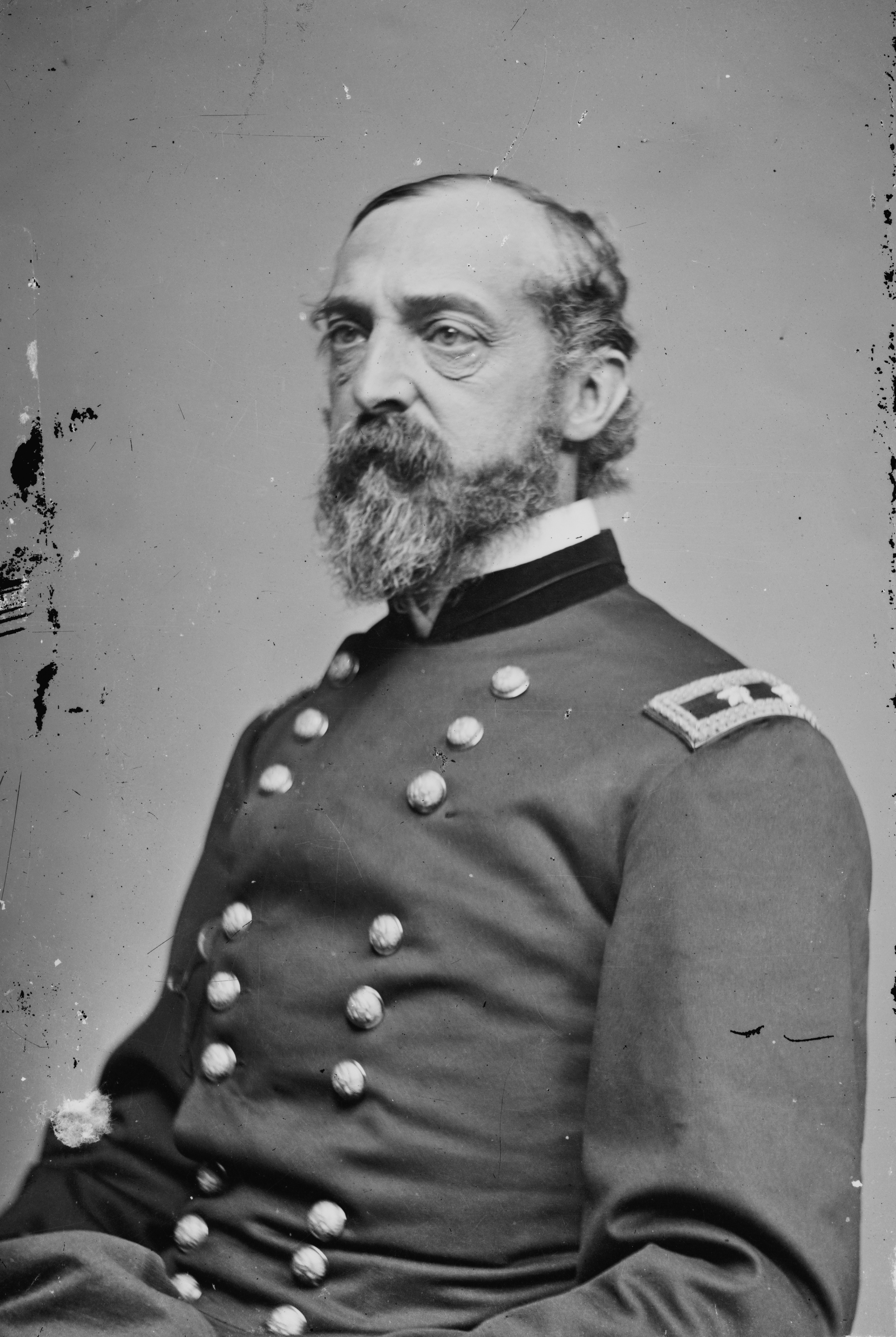
Maj Gen G. Meade

The Union force in the Battle of the Wilderness was the Army of the Potomac and a separate IX Corps. The Army of the Potomac was commanded by Major General George G. Meade, and Major General Ambrose E. Burnside was commander of the IX Corps. Both Meade and Burnside reported to Grant, who rode with Meade and his army. (Note: Burnside was senior to Meade, so his corps was not combined into the Army of the Potomac because of his higher ranking. A few weeks later on May 24, Grant assigned the IX Corps to the Army of the Potomac, with Burnside commanding the IX Corps and Meade commanding the Army of the Potomac. Burnside did not object to the new command structure, and thought "good will result from it".) The II Corps was the largest of the army, with 28,333 officers and enlisted men present for duty and equipped as of April 30, 1864. (Note: "Present for Duty and Equipped" is defined as officers and men actually available for battle. Certain non-combatants are not included.) At the beginning of the campaign in May, Grant's Union forces totaled 118,700 men and 316 artillery pieces including Meade's Army of the Potomac and Burnside's IX Corps. (Note: Counts of the Union soldiers from other sources do not differ by much. The National Park Service uses 120,000, and historian Gordon C. Rhea uses "nearly 120,000". Historian David W. Hogan Jr. uses 100,000 for Meade and 16,000 for Burnside. The American Battlefield Trust says 101,895 Union forces engaged.)

- II Corps, commanded by Major General Winfield S. Hancock, consisted of four divisions of infantry. This was Meade's premier fighting unit.
- V Corps, commanded by Major General Gouverneur K. Warren, had four divisions of infantry.
- VI Corps had three divisions and was commanded by Major General John Sedgwick.
- Cavalry Corps, newly commanded by Major General Philip Sheridan, had three divisions. The 3rd Division's 5th New York Cavalry Regiment was armed with seven-shot Spencer carbines, as was the First Brigade of the 1st Division, known as the Michigan Brigade.
- Additional men in Meade's army that were not part of the four corps were from the provost guard, a small group of guards and orderlies, and portions of the artillery not assigned to a corps.
- IX Corps, commanded by Burnside, consisted of four divisions of infantry, each with its own artillery. Burnside also had reserve artillery and two regiments of cavalry. Only about 6,000 men in IX Corps were veterans.

=== Confederate ===
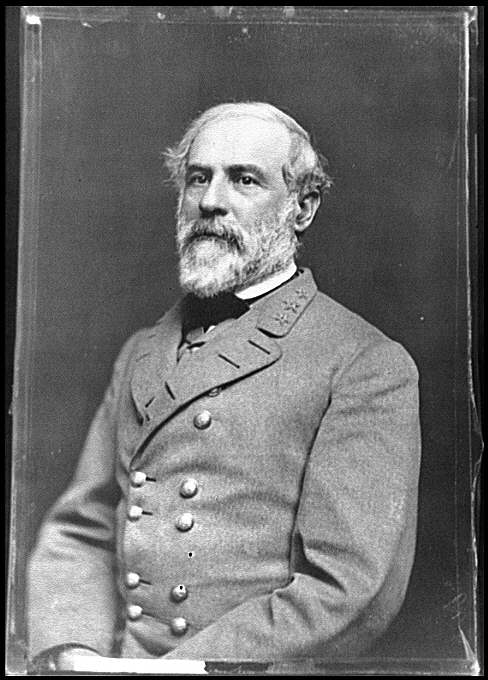
Gen R. E. Lee

The Confederate force in the Battle of the Wilderness was the Army of Northern Virginia, commanded by General Robert E. Lee. Listed below are Lee's three infantry corps and one cavalry corps, which totaled to 66,140 men including staff and men in the artillery. (Note: The count for the size of the Army of Northern Virginia of 66,140 is from Alfred C. Young's detailed study of Confederate company records, reports, and newspaper accounts. The count used by other sources varies from about 61,000 to 65,000. Rhea uses 65,000. Historian David J. Eicher uses "64,000 men in the field and 274 field guns". The National Park Service and American Battlefield Trust use 61,025 engaged.) Each corps had three divisions plus artillery except the First Corps, which had only two divisions present. The Third Corps was the largest, with 22,675 men plus another 1,910 for artillery.

- First Corps was commanded by Lieutenant General James Longstreet. This was Lee's elite fighting unit.
- Second Corps was commanded by Lieutenant General Richard S. Ewell.
- Third Corps was commanded by Lieutenant General Ambrose Powell "A.P." Hill.
- Cavalry Corps was commanded by Major General James Ewell Brown "Jeb" Stuart.

== Disposition of forces and movement to battle ==
=== The Wilderness ===
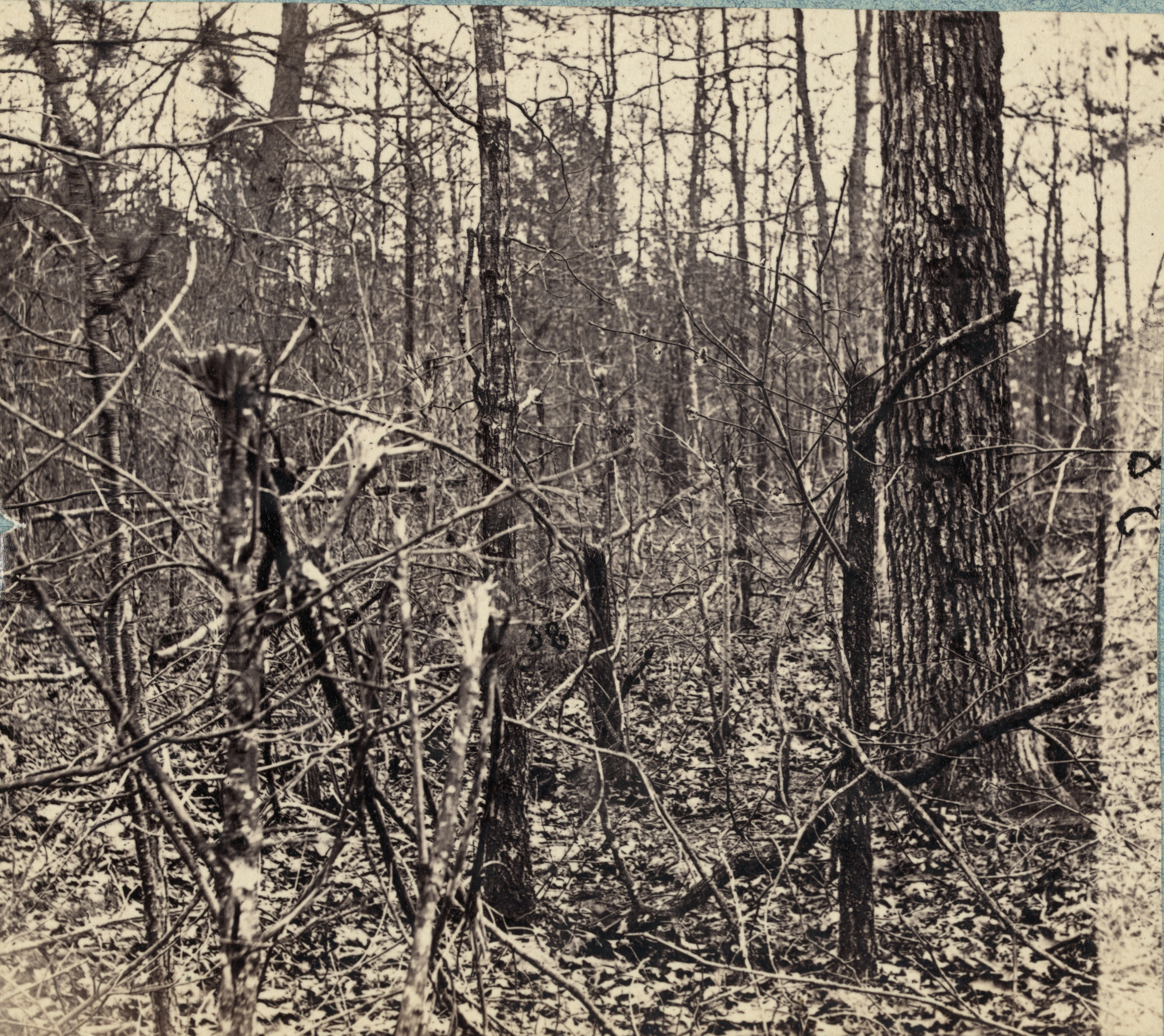
Portion of the Wilderness battlefield photographed in 1865 near Palmer and Spotswoods houses

The Wilderness is located south of the Rapidan River in Virginia's Spotsylvania County and Orange County. Its southern border is Spotsylvania Court House, and western border is usually considered the Rapidan River tributary Mine Run. Its eastern border is less definite, causing estimates of the size of the Wilderness to vary. While the maximum area for the Wilderness is 132 square miles (340 km^{2}) to 156 square miles (400 km^{2}), historians discussing the battles fought there typically use 70 square miles (180 km^{2}). At the time of the battle, the region was a "patchwork of open areas and vegetation of varying density." Much of the vegetation was a dense second-growth forest consisting of small trees, bushes, shrubs, and pines. (Note: Early European settlers in the Wilderness area of Virginia had cut down the native forests for tobacco cultivation, which ended after the soil was exhausted. The depleted fields were then abandoned, and small trees and shrubs reclaimed the land. Next, smaller portions of the forest were again cut down, and then abandoned, as fuel for mining industries. In 1732, William Byrd described land near an iron mine in what became known as the Wilderness as "exceeding barren, and the growth of trees upon it hardly big enough for coaling". In the 1850s, a small portion of the forest was used as material for building plank roads. This created newer sections of second-growth forest and dense shrubs.)

Since clearings were scarce, and the region had only a few narrow winding roads, mounted cavalry fighting was nearly impossible. The dense woods, often filled with smoke, made it difficult to see enemy soldiers. This put attackers at a disadvantage, as soldiers often fired at sounds instead of visual cues. Infantry units had difficulty keeping alignment, and often became lost or were involved in friendly-fire incidents. The Confederates had a better knowledge of the terrain, and it diminished the Union advantage of greater manpower. The terrain also diminished the effectiveness of artillery. Grant was aware of how the Wilderness made his advantages in size and artillery less effective, and preferred to move his army further south to fight Lee in open ground.

=== Lee prepares ===
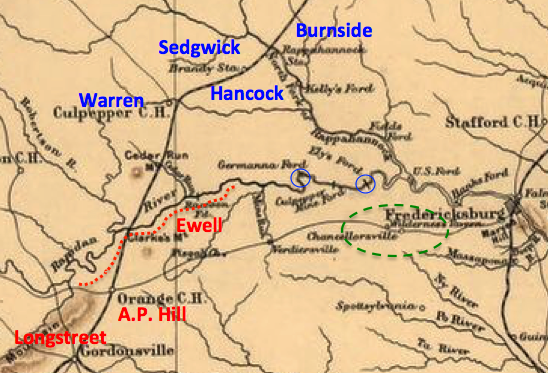
May 2 Virginia positions of Union (blue) and Confederate (red) forces, with the Wilderness Tavern area circled in green and main fords circled in blue

On May 2, Lee met with his generals on Clark Mountain, obtaining a panoramic view of the Union camps. He realized that Grant was getting ready to attack, but did not know the precise route of advance. He predicted (correctly) that Grant would cross to the east of the Confederate fortifications on the Rapidan, using the Germanna and Ely fords, but he could not be certain.

To retain flexibility of response, Lee had dispersed his army over a wide area. Longstreet's First Corps was around Gordonsville, from where they had the flexibility to respond by railroad to potential threats to the Shenandoah Valley or to Richmond. Hill's Third Corps was outside Orange Court House. Ewell's Second Corps was near Morton's Ford and Mine Run, northeast of Hill. Stuart's cavalry was scattered further south from Gordonsville to Fredericksburg.

=== Grant crosses the river ===
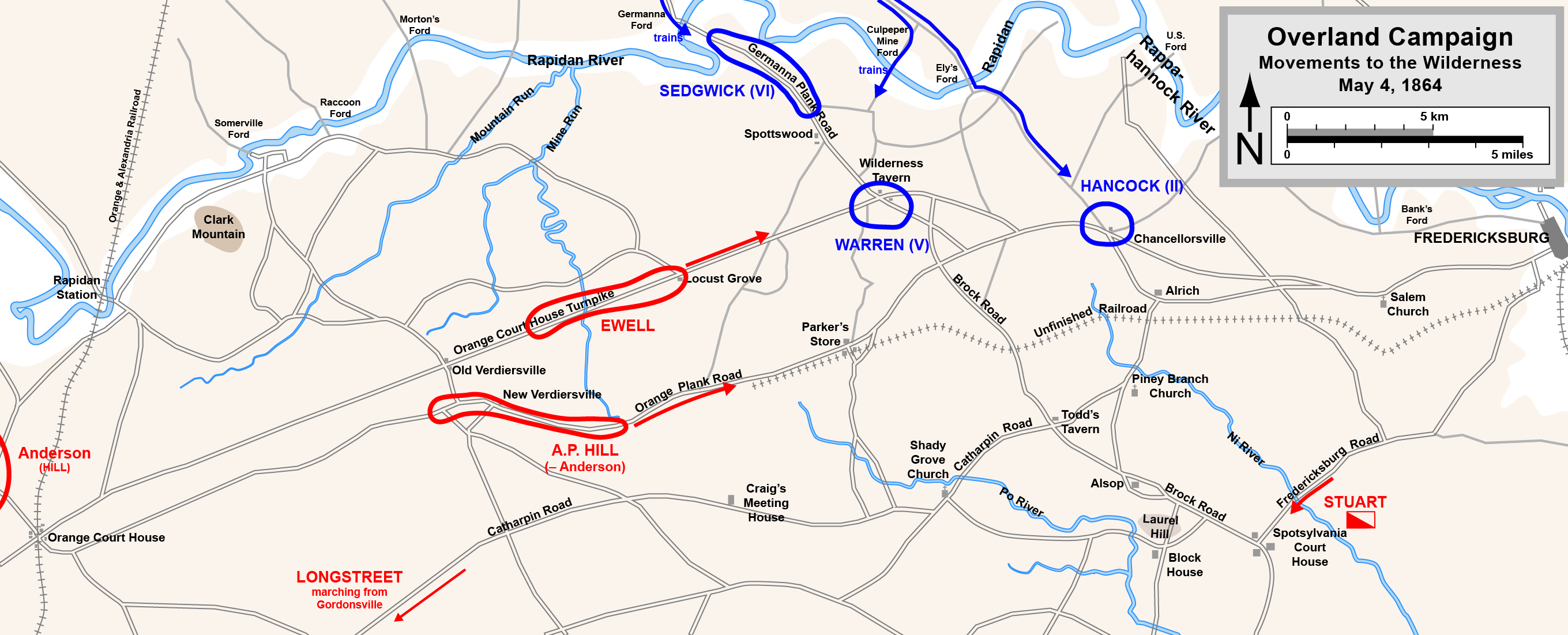
Overland Campaign begins as Union (blue) and Confederate (red) troops move to the Wilderness in Virginia.

On May 4, 1864, the Army of the Potomac crossed the Rapidan River at three places and converged on the Wilderness of Spotsylvania in east central Virginia. Brigadier General James H. Wilson led his 3rd Cavalry Division across the river at Germanna Ford between 4:00 am and 6:00 am, and drove off a small group of Confederate cavalry pickets. After engineers placed pontoon bridges, the V Corps (Warren) and later the VI Corps (Sedgwick) crossed safely. Wilson continued south on the Germanna Plank Road toward Wilderness Tavern and the Orange Turnpike. He halted at Wilderness Tavern at noon to wait for the V Corps, and sent scouts to the south and west.

A few miles east, Brigadier General David M. Gregg led his 2nd Cavalry Division across the river at Ely's Ford. They tried to capture the nearby Confederate outpost, but the southerners fled into the darkness. By 9:00 am a pontoon bridge was placed across the water, and the II Corps (Hancock) began crossing. Gregg's cavalry moved south to Chancellorsville, where Hancock's men planned to camp. Once Hancock's men began arriving, Gregg moved further south to Alrich near the intersection of the Orange Plank Road and Catharpin Road, where they would protect Hancock and the army's wagons.

The IX Corps (Burnside) remained north of the river near Germanna Ford, with orders to protect the supply train. Although Grant insisted that the army travel light with minimal artillery and supplies, its supply train was 60 to 70 miles (97 to 110 km) long. Meade had an estimated 4,300 wagons, 835 ambulances, and a herd of cattle. The supply train crossed the Rapidan at Ely's and Culpeper Mine fords. At Culpeper Mine Ford, it was guarded by Brigadier General Alfred T. A. Torbert's 1st Cavalry Division. Grant and Meade gambled that they could move the army quickly enough to avoid being ensnared in the Wilderness, but Meade halted the II and V corps to allow the wagon train to catch up.

=== Lee responds ===
At the Wilderness a year earlier, Lee defeated the Army of the Potomac in the Battle of Chancellorsville despite having an army less than half the size of the Union army. Much of the fighting at that time occurred slightly east of the Union Army's current route. Having already secured a victory one year ago in similar circumstances, Lee hoped to fight Grant in the Wilderness. However, Lee needed Longstreet's First Corps to be in position to fight before the battle started.

As Grant's plan became clearer to Lee on May 4, Lee arranged his forces to use the advantages of the Wilderness. He needed his Second and Third corps to delay Grant's army until Longstreet's First Corps could get in place. Ewell's Second Corps was sent east on the Orange Turnpike, reaching Robertson's Tavern at Locust Grove. His lead column camped about two miles (3.2 km) from the unsuspecting Union soldiers. Hill was sent east on the Orange Plank Road and stopped at the hamlet of New Verdiersville. Hill had two of his three divisions. The division commanded by Major General Richard H. Anderson was left at Orange Court House to guard the river. These two corps were to avoid battle, if possible, until Longstreet's First Corps arrived. That evening, Lee decided that Ewell and Hill should strike first, preserving the initiative. Longstreet would arrive a day later, or Ewell and Hill could retreat west to Mine Run if necessary. Orders were sent around 8:00 pm to move early in the morning.

=== Union cavalry ===
The Wilderness was "peculiarly unsuitable for the operations of cavalry, covered ... in every direction with dense thickets that were impenetrable to horsemen and intersected by few and narrow paths which permitted of movement only in long-extended and thin columns...."

— Brigadier General James H. Wilson, 3rd Cavalry Division

At Wilderness Tavern, Wilson sent a small force west on the Orange Turnpike. After the head of the V Corps reached Wilderness Tavern around 11:00 am, Wilson continued south. He arrived at Parker's Store near the Orange Plank Road at 2:00 pm. Scouts were sent south to Catharpin Road and west to Mine Run where they found only small enemy squads. During that time, his squad on the Orange Turnpike skirmished with Confederate soldiers near Robertson's Tavern (Locust Grove). Assuming they were fighting with a small group of Confederate pickets, they withdrew and by evening rejoined the division at Parker's Store.

Meade's original plan was to have Torbert's 1st Cavalry Division join Wilson, but he received an erroneous report that the Confederate cavalry was operating in his army's rear, in the direction of Fredericksburg. He ordered his 1st and 2nd cavalry divisions to move east to deal with that perceived threat, leaving only Wilson's division to screen for three corps. Wilson had little experience with cavalry, and the 3rd Division was the smallest of the three cavalry divisions. Meade believed that Lee would fight from behind (west of) Mine Run, and aligned his army north to south from Germanna Ford to Shady Grove Church while it spent the night in the Wilderness. This change of plans by the Union leadership did not serve the army well. Not only were the Union forces spending the night in the Wilderness, "lax cavalry patrols" were causing leadership to be unaware of the proximity of Lee's Second Corps (Ewell).

== Battle May 5 ==
The Battle of the Wilderness had two distinct fronts, the Orange Turnpike and the Orange Plank Road, where most of the fighting was conducted by infantry. Any efforts to bridge the gap between those two fronts did not last long. Most of the cavalry fighting occurred south of the infantry, especially along Catharpin Road and Brock Road.

=== Hammond's cavalry ===
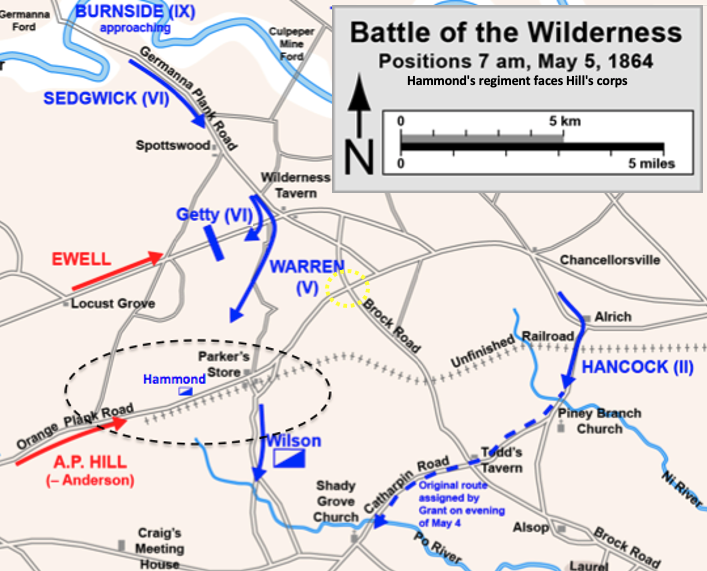
Hammond found A.P. Hill's Third Infantry Corps

At 5:00 am on May 5, Wilson's Division proceeded southward from Parker's Store. The 5th New York Cavalry, commanded by Lieutenant Colonel John Hammond, was detached and instructed to patrol west of the Parker's Store area until relieved by Warren's V Corps. A probe west on the Orange Plank Road discovered Confederate soldiers. Despite being reinforced, the Union probe was driven back toward Parker's Store. It was soon discovered that they were fighting infantry from most of Hill's Third Corps.

Hammond's total force consisted of only about 500 men. Hammond understood that the dense woods and the large infantry force made fighting on horseback inadvisable. The command fought dismounted and spread out as a skirmish line while utilizing their Spencer repeating rifles. The regiment slowly retreated east, moving toward and beyond Parker's Store on the Orange Plank Road. Once the Confederates advanced east of Parker's Store, the remainder of Wilson's cavalry division was cut off from Meade and Warren's V Corps.

=== Orange Turnpike ===
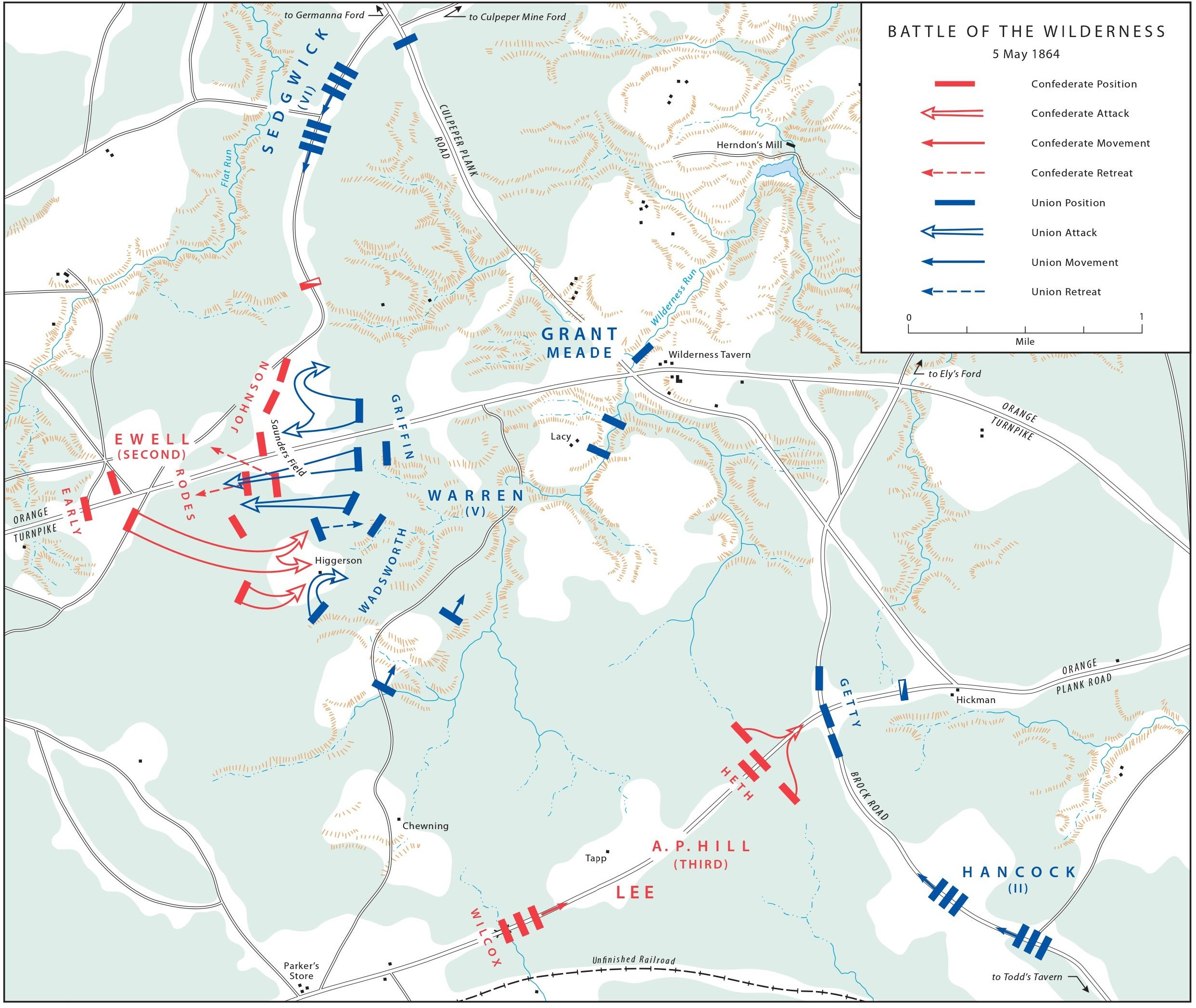
May 5: Warren faces Ewell while Getty stops Hill.

At 6:00 am on May 5, Warren's V Corps began moving south over farm lanes toward Parker's Store. The Confederate infantry was observed in the west near the Orange Turnpike, and Meade was notified. Grant instructed "If any opportunity presents itself of pitching into a part of Lee's army, do so without giving time for disposition." Meade halted his army and directed Warren to attack, assuming that the Confederates were a division and not an entire infantry corps. Hancock was held at Todd's tavern. Although Meade told Grant that the threat was probably a delaying tactic without the intent to give battle, he stopped his entire army—the exact thing Lee wanted him to do. The Confederate force was Ewell's Second Corps, and his men erected earthworks on the western end of the clearing known as Saunders Field. (Note: Saunders Field was a corn patch about 400 yards (370 m) wide and 800 yards (730 m) deep. It was one of the few large clearings in the Wilderness, and the Orange Turnpike ran through its middle. Saunders Field is sometimes called Palmer Field.) Ewell's instructions from Lee were to not advance too fast, since his corps was out of the reach of Hill's Third Corps—and Longstreet's First Corps was not yet at the battlefield.

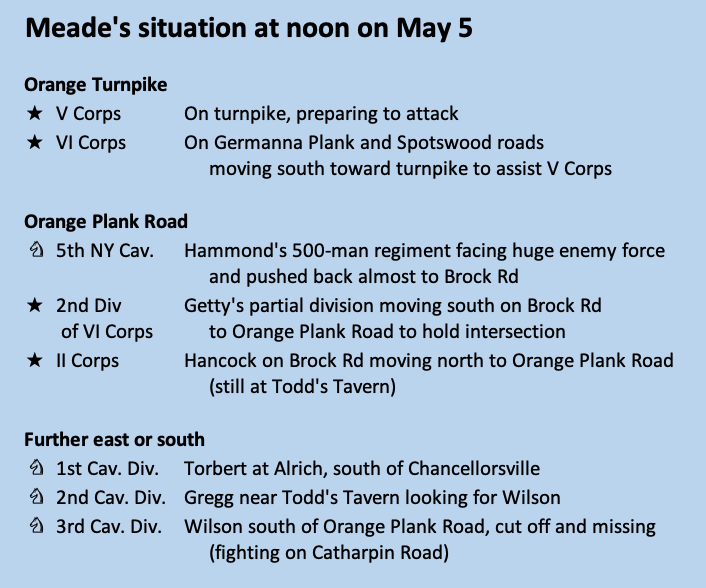
At noon, Meade had two fronts and no help from cavalry.

Warren approached the eastern end of Saunders Field with the division of Brigadier General Charles Griffin along the road on the right and the division of Brigadier General James S. Wadsworth on the left. Brigadier General Samuel W. Crawford's division was too far away on the left near Chewning Farm, and the division of Brigadier General John C. Robinson was in reserve closer to Wilderness Tavern. It took time to align Warren's divisions, and there was some concern about Griffin's northern (right) flank. A major problem was that "once a division left the roads or fields it disappeared utterly, and its commander could not tell whether it was in line with the others...." Brigadier General Horatio Wright's 1st Division from Sedgwick's VI Corps began to move south on the Germanna Plank Road to Spotswood Road to protect Warren's right. Warren requested a delay from attacking to wait for Wright. By 12:00 pm, Meade was frustrated by the delay and ordered Warren to attack before Sedgwick's VI Corps could arrive. Warren's troops arrived at Saunders Field around 1:00 pm. The Confederate division of Major General Edward Johnson was positioned on the Orange Turnpike west of Sanders Field, and it also guarded the Spotswood Road route of Sedgwick. Behind Johnson and further south was the division of Major General Robert E. Rodes, while the division of Major General Jubal Early waited further west in reserve.

=== Fight at Saunders Field ===
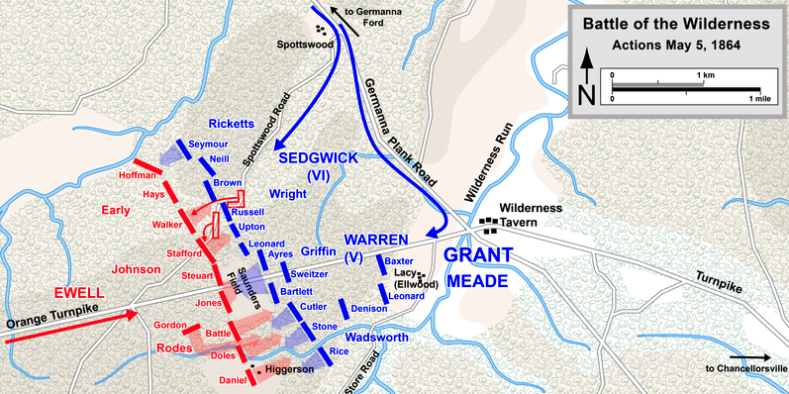
3:00 pm May 5: Sedgewick arrives to assist Warren.

By the time the Union line arrived near the enemy, it had numerous gaps, and some regiments faced north instead of west. The concerns about Warren's right flank were justified. As Griffin's division advanced, Ayres's brigade held the right but had difficulty maintaining its lines in a "blizzard of lead". They received enfilading fire on their right from the brigade of Confederate brigadier general, Leroy A. Stafford, causing all but two regiments (140th and 146th New York) to retreat east across Saunders Field. On the left of Ayres, the brigade of Brigadier General Joseph J. Bartlett made better progress and overran the position of Confederate brigadier general, John M. Jones, who was killed. (Note: Jones' brigade was protected on its right by only a small group of dismounted cavalry, and it was outflanked on that side. Jones and a member of his staff, Captain Robert D. Early, were killed. Early was the nephew of Major General Jubal A. Early.) However, since Ayres's men were unable to advance, Bartlett's right flank was now exposed to attack and his brigade was forced to flee back across the clearing. Bartlett's horse was shot out from under him, and he barely escaped capture.

To the left of Bartlett was Wadsworth's Iron Brigade, which was composed of regiments from the Midwest and commanded by Brigadier General Lysander Cutler. The Iron Brigade advanced through woods south of Saunders Field and contributed to the collapse of Jones' brigade while capturing battle flags and taking prisoners. However, the Iron Brigade outdistanced Bartlett's men—exposing the Midwesterner's right flank. The Confederate brigade of Brigadier General George P. Doles attacked the exposed flank, and the Iron Brigade's 6th Wisconsin Infantry Regiment suffered nearly 50 casualties in only a few minutes. Soon, the Confederate brigade of Brigadier General John B. Gordon joined in the attack, tearing through the Union line and forcing the Iron Brigade to break and retreat. (Note: The famed Iron Brigade, sometimes called the Iron Brigade of the West (today's Midwest) to differentiate it from other units that claimed the same name, was formerly one of the elite fighting units in the Union army, earning its reputation at battles such as the Battle of South Mountain, the Battle of Antietam, and the Battle of Gettysburg. At Gettysburg, it suffered over 60 percent casualties. By then, losses were so heavy that the brigade was never again as effective as it was earlier, despite replacements.)

Further to the Union left, near the Higgerson farm, the Union brigade of Colonel Roy Stone was ambushed in waist-high swamp water, and the survivors fled northeast to the fields of the Lacy House (a.k.a. Ellwood Manor). One soldier blamed the fiasco on the gap between Stone's brigade and the Iron Brigade. On Wadsworth's farthest left, the brigade of Brigadier General James C. Rice suffered severe losses when the North Carolina brigade commanded by Brigadier General Junius Daniel got around Rice's unprotected left. The problem was compounded when Stone's brigade fell back from Rice's right. Rice's survivors were chased by Daniel's men almost back to the Lacy House, where the V Corps artillery was used to slow the pursuing Confederates. A quick fight over the guns resulted in casualties for both sides. Rice's losses were severe, including two of his five regimental commanders wounded.

Suddenly, to the horror of the living, fire was seen creeping over the ground, fed by dead leaves which were thick. All who could move tried to get beyond the Pike, which the fire could not cross. Some were overtaken by the flames....

— Unnamed wounded soldier, 7th Indiana Infantry

Further south, Crawford's First Brigade, commanded by Colonel William McCandless, did not reach the fighting in time to help Wadsworth's left. The brigade became surrounded by Confederates, and its 7th Pennsylvania Reserve Regiment was captured. Crawford was in danger of having the remaining portion of his division cut off, so it withdrew toward the Lacy House while the Confederates occupied the Chewning farm. Back at Saunders Field, Warren had ordered an artillery section into Saunders Field to support his attack, but it was captured by Confederate soldiers, who were pinned down and prevented by rifle fire from moving the guns. Amid hand-to-hand combat at the guns, the field caught fire and men from both sides were shocked as their wounded comrades burned to death. The first phase of fighting on the Orange Turnpike was over by 2:30 pm.

The lead elements of Sedgwick's VI Corps reached Saunders Field around 3:00 pm. Wright commanded the renewal of fighting until Sedgwick arrived around 3:30 pm. The fighting was now in the woods north of the turnpike, and both sides traded attacks and counterattacks. Ewell held his position for the remainder of the afternoon. During the fray, Confederate brigadier general, Leroy A. Stafford, was shot through the shoulder blade, the bullet severing his spine. Despite being paralyzed from the waist down and in agonizing pain, he managed to still urge his troops forward. He died four days later.

=== Getty and Hancock at Orange Plank Road ===
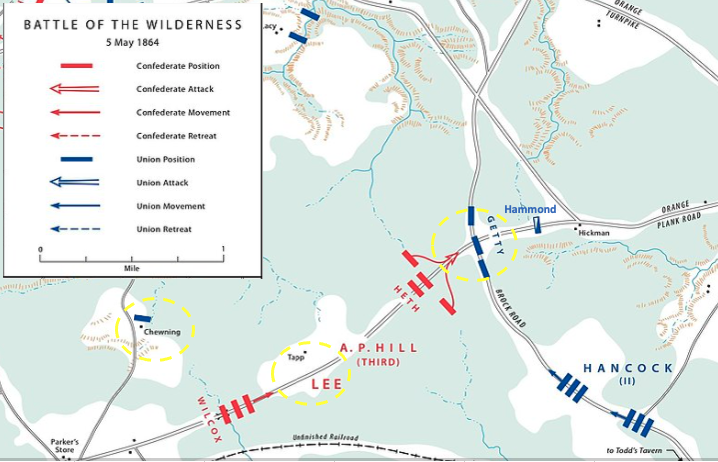
Getty kept Union control of the vital intersection of Orange Plank Road and Brock Road.

Visibility was limited near Orange Plank Road, and officers had difficulty controlling men and maintaining formations. Attackers would move blindly and noisily forward, becoming targets for concealed defenders. Unable to duplicate the surprise that was achieved by Ewell on the turnpike, A.P. Hill's approach was detected from the Chewning farm location of Crawford's 3rd Division of the V Corps. Crawford notified Meade, and his message arrived at Meade's headquarters around 10:15 am.

Crawford sent the 13th Pennsylvania Reserve Regiment (a.k.a. the Bucktails) as skirmishers toward Hill, but Hammond's line was falling apart before the Bucktails arrived near the Orange Plank Road. Crawford did not support his Pennsylvanians, and instead worked to solidify his position at the Chewning Farm and get ready to assist in the Orange Turnpike fighting. By the time this was accomplished, Hammond was beyond helping. Meade's army was in danger if Hill could push Hammond beyond Brock Road and take control of the intersection (Orange Plank and Brock roads). That would cause Warren's V Corps to have large enemy forces on two sides, and Hancock's II Corps could get isolated from the rest of Meade's army.

Although Hancock was not far from the intersection of Orange Plank Road and Brock Road, he would have to move four miles (6.4 km) on a twisting road that was a narrow wagon route. The VI Corps's lead division of Brigadier General George W. Getty was waiting at Wilderness Tavern, so at 10:30 am Meade sent it to defend the important intersection until Hancock could get there. Hammond's 500-man cavalry force, employing repeating carbines and fighting dismounted, succeeded in slowing Hill's approach. However, Hammond's small force was vastly outnumbered and continued to gradually retreat east.

Lee established his headquarters at the Widow Tapp farm. Lee, Jeb Stuart, and Hill were meeting there when they were surprised by a party of Union soldiers entering the clearing. The three generals ran for safety and the Union men, who were equally surprised by the encounter, returned to the woods, unaware of how close they had come to changing the course of history.

By noon, Hill had the division of Major General Henry Heth past the Widow Tapp farm, and the division of Major General Cadmus M. Wilcox followed near Parker's Store. (Note: A widow named Catharine Tapp lived in a small cabin with a 40-acre (16 ha) field, called the Widow Tapp farm, that was one of the few clearings near the battlefield's Orange Plank Road. The house is several hundred yards (180 m) from the road, and partially obscured by trees. From the Orange Plank Road, the farm is located about one mile (1.6 km) west of Brock Road.) Hammond was nearly out of ammunition and was eventually pushed back to the vital intersection around noon, but was relieved by Getty's advance brigade just before Hill's forces arrived. Hammond's force moved further east behind Getty, and was done fighting. (Note: The official report lists Hammond's 5th New York Cavalry as having 50 casualties.) Because of Hammond's repeating rifles, the Confederate prisoners stated that they believed they had been fighting an entire brigade. Getty's men skirmished briefly with Heth's advance, and held the intersection.

Getty held the intersection for hours waiting for Hancock's II Corps to arrive. By 3:30 pm, initial elements of Hancock's corps were arriving, and Meade ordered Getty to assault the Confederate line. Getty attacked at 4:15 pm while elements of Hancock's II Corps began arriving shortly thereafter. Getty was reinforced by Hancock's men, while Confederate commander Heth was reinforced by Wilcox's division. The fighting was fierce, with casualties for the brigade commanded by Brigadier General Alexander Hays particularly high—including Hays who was killed while addressing the 63rd Pennsylvania Infantry Regiment. Hays was an old friend of Grant, having attended West Point with him and served with him in the Mexican War, and Grant was saddened to hear the news, remarking that he was not surprised to learn he had died in battle as "It was just like him." Attacks and counterattacks continued into the night as casualties grew while neither side gained an advantage. Getty's division was relieved by the II Corps after dark, and Getty's horse was killed in the day's fighting.

=== Wilson at Catharpin Road ===
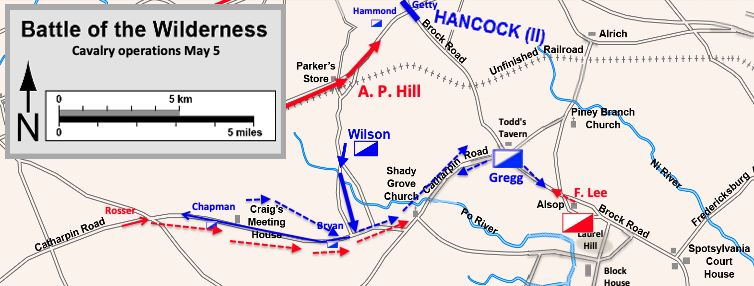
Wilson encountered Rosser.

Leaving Hammond's regiment at Parker's Store at 5:00 am on May 5, Wilson moved his two brigades south. His Second Brigade led the way, and it was commanded by Colonel George H. Chapman. His First Brigade was commanded by Colonel Timothy M. Bryan. (Note: Bryan had been replaced as brigade commander by Colonel John B. McIntosh, who had not yet arrived. McIntosh reached Hammond while Hammond was fighting Hill's infantry, and remained with Hammond because his route to join Wilson was blocked by Hill.) Chapman reached Catharpin Road and moved west beyond Craig's Meeting House, where he found 1,000 men from a Confederate cavalry brigade commanded by Brigadier General Thomas L. Rosser. After initially driving Rosser back, both of Wilson's brigades fled east after finding Hill's infantry on their north side and Rosser's cavalry on the Catharpin Road on their south side. The 18th Pennsylvania Cavalry Regiment was the rear guard, and it became surrounded on three sides. The regiment left the road and blended into the woods and a swamp.

While Wilson battled Rosser, Sheridan's other two cavalry divisions were further east. Around noon, Meade notified Sheridan that Wilson had been cut off, and Gregg's 2nd Cavalry Division was sent to explore the Catharpin Road. Gregg found Wilson and confronted Rosser, who was driven back across the Po River bridge. In late afternoon, Gregg also fought Major General Fitzhugh Lee's cavalry division on the Brock Road near Alsop. At nightfall, Rosser sat on the high ground west of the Po River bridge, Lee's men camped near Alsop, and Wilson's exhausted division camped north and east of Todd's Tavern. Wilson was surprised that evening when the 18th Pennsylvania Cavalry, thought to be captured, rejoined the division. (Note: The 18th Pennsylvania Cavalry, commanded by Lieutenant Colonel William P. Brinton, escaped through the woods with losses of one officer and 39 men.) During the night, Gregg remained at Todd's Tavern, Wilson put Chapman's Brigade on the Brock Road, and the brigade of George Armstrong Custer from Torbert's division began moving to relieve Wilson. While the remaining portion of Torbert's Division was south of Chancellorsville at Alrich, Torbert checked into a hospital and Brigadier General Wesley Merritt assumed command of the division.

== Battle May 6 ==
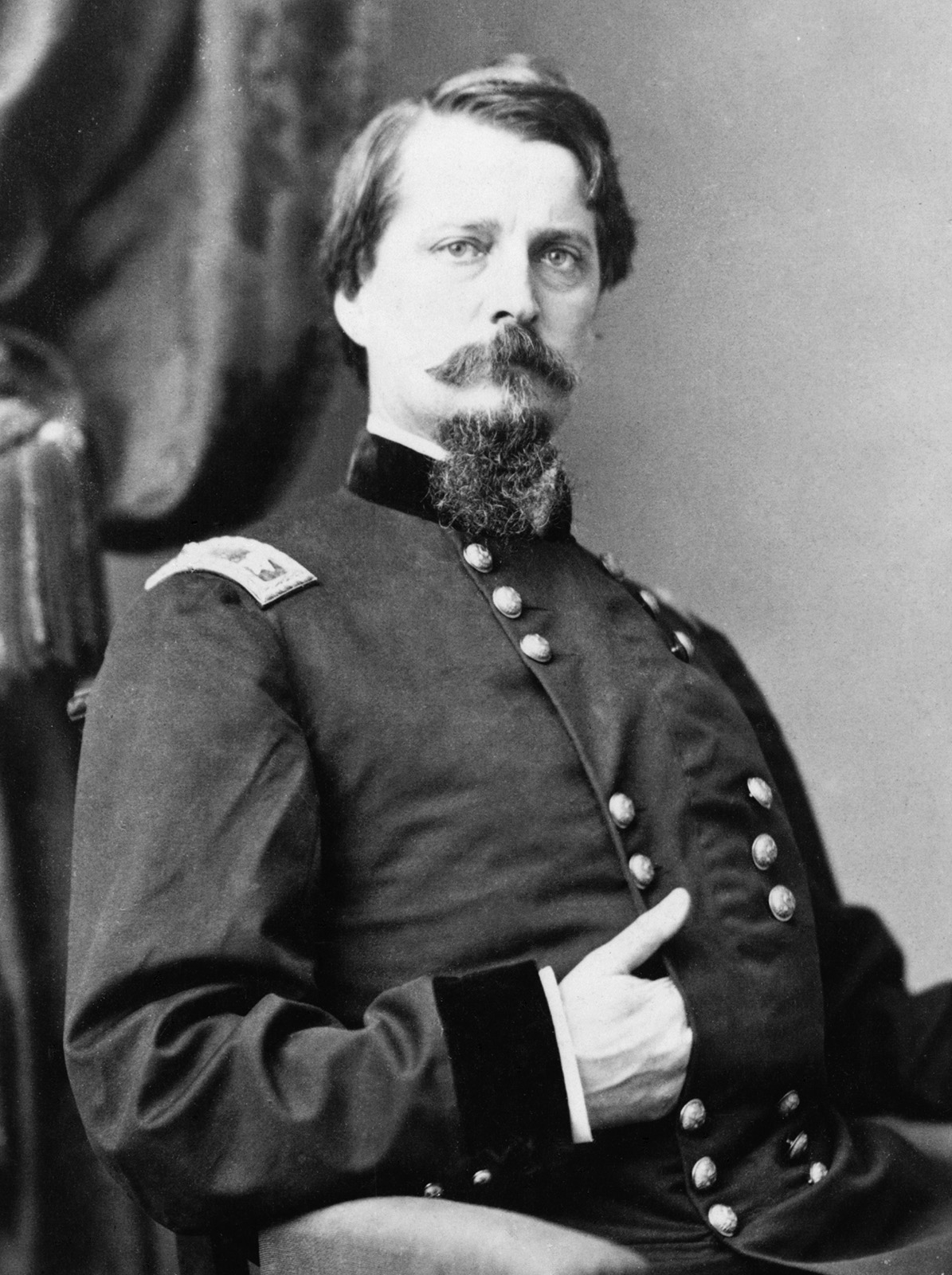
Maj Gen W. S. Hancock

Grant's plan for May 6 was to resume the attacks at 5:00 am. Sedgwick and Warren would renew their attack on Ewell at the Orange Turnpike, and Hancock and Getty would attack Hill again on the Orange Plank Road. At the same time, an additional force of men currently stationed around the Lacy House would move south and attack Hill's exposed northern flank. Wadsworth requested leadership of this force, and it consisted of his division plus a fresh brigade from Robinson's division commanded by Brigadier General Henry Baxter. Adding to Wadsworth, two divisions from Burnside's IX Corps were to move through the area between the turnpike and the Plank Road and move south to flank Hill. (Note: Burnside's IX Corps was supposed to join the May 6 early morning attack around 5:30 am. Three of his brigades arrived at the Confederate northern flank around 1:30 pm—about 8 hours late.)

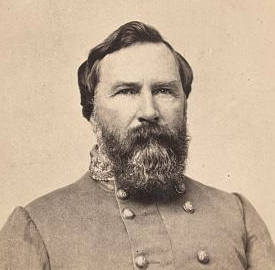
Lt Gen J. Longstreet

Hill's weary men spent the evening of May 5 and the early morning hours of May 6 resting where they had fought—with little line integrity and some regiments separated from their brigades. The men from Heth's division were generally on the north side of the Orange Plank Road, while the men from Wilcox's division were mostly on the south side. Although he was aware that Hill's front line along the Orange Plank Road needed to be reformed, Lee chose to allow Hill's men to rest where they were—assuming that Longstreet's First Corps and Hill's remaining division, commanded by Major General Anderson, would arrive in time to relieve Heth and Wilcox. Longstreet's men had marched 32 miles (51 km) in 24 hours, but were still 10 miles (16 km) from the battlefield. Once Longstreet's men arrived, Lee planned to shift Hill to the left to cover some of the open ground between his divided forces. Longstreet calculated that he had sufficient time to allow his men, tired from marching all day, to rest and the First Corps did not resume marching until 1:00 am. Moving cross-country in the dark, they made slow progress and lost their way at times, and by sunrise had not reached their designated position.

=== Attacks begin ===
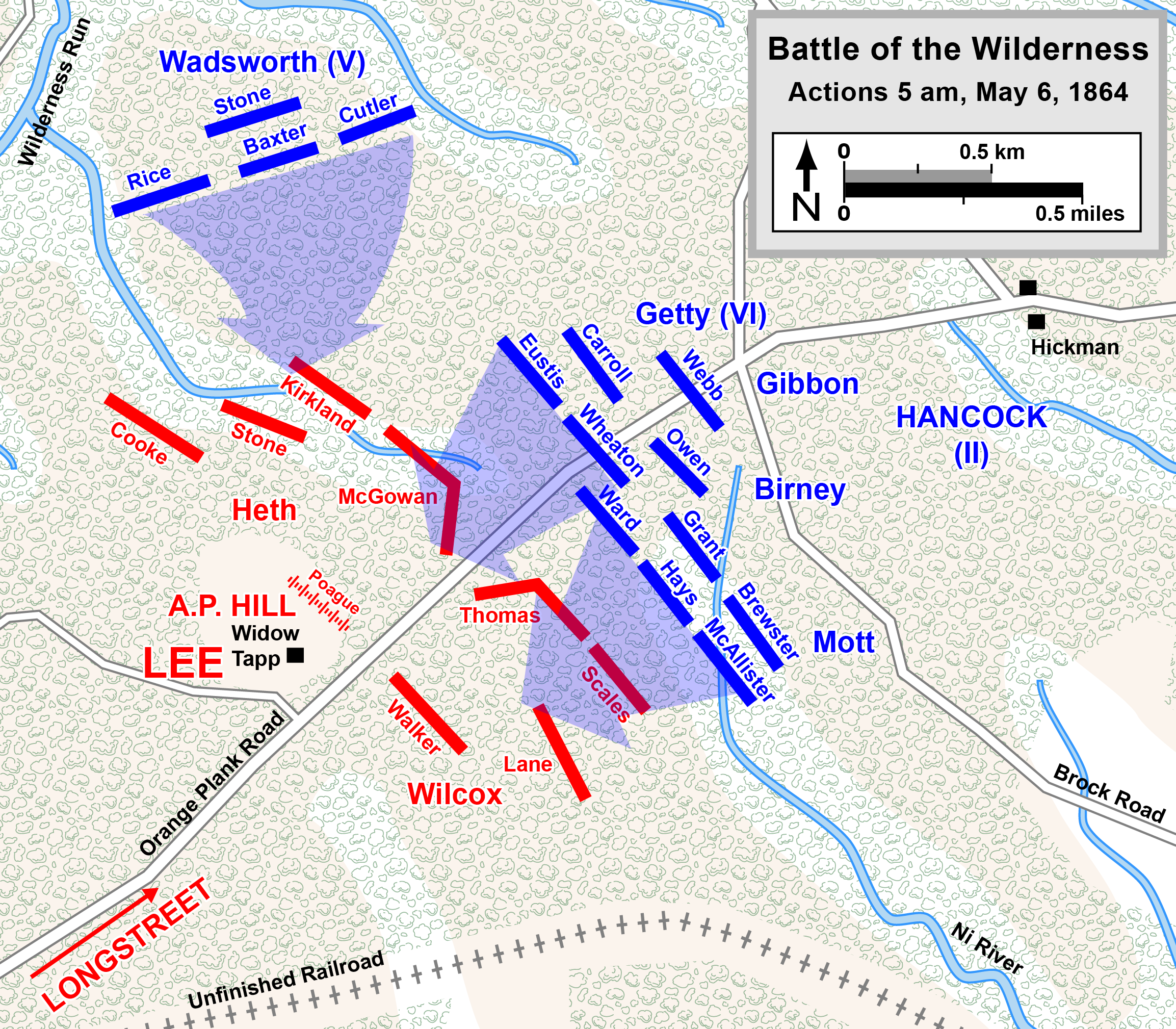
Hancock attacks Hill.

During the night, Ewell placed his artillery on his extreme left and on both sides of the Orange Turnpike. He also had an abatis in front of his trenchline. He attacked Sedgwick on the north side of the turnpike at 4:45 am. His line moved forward and then back on multiple occasions, and some ground was fought over as many as five times.

To the south on the Orange Plank Road, Hancock's II Corps with Getty's division attacked Hill at 5:00 am, overwhelming the ill-prepared Third Corps in concert with Wadsworth. Following Hill's orders, Lieutenant Colonel William T. Poague's 12 guns at the Widow Tapp farm fired tirelessly at the road—despite the Confederate soldiers retreating in front of the guns. This slowed the Union advance, but could not stop it. Brig. Gen Alexander S. Webb's brigade of Gibbon's division was sent to support Getty but ended up being isolated from the latter and blundered into some of Hill's troops. The brigade was forced to retreat with 300 casualties and Webb wrote afterward that he never did figure out exactly where or what he was supposed to be doing.

While Hill's corps retreated, reinforcements arrived. Longstreet rode ahead of his men and arrived at the battlefield around 6:00 am. His men marched east and then turned north, arriving on the Orange Plank Road near Parker's Store where they found men from Hill's corps retreating. Brigadier General John Gregg's Texas Brigade was the vanguard of Longstreet's column. (Note: The brigade commanded by Brigadier General George T. Anderson had been Longstreet's vanguard, but it went into a blocking position on the side of the road. This made the Texas Brigade, which included the 3rd Arkansas Infantry, the vanguard in the final approach to the battle.) General Lee did not recognize the brigade's commander Brig. Gen John M. Gregg, a former officer from the Army of Tennessee who got command of the outfit the previous fall when it was serving out west and he asked what unit this was. Gregg replied that it was the Texas Brigade, whereupon Lee waved his hat over his head and shouted, "Texans always move them!" Caught up in the excitement, Lee began to move forward behind the advancing brigade. As the Texans realized this, they halted and grabbed the reins of Lee's horse, Traveller, telling the general that they were concerned for his safety and would only go forward if he moved to a less exposed location. Longstreet was able to convince Lee that he had matters well in hand and the commanding general relented.

=== Longstreet counterattacks ===
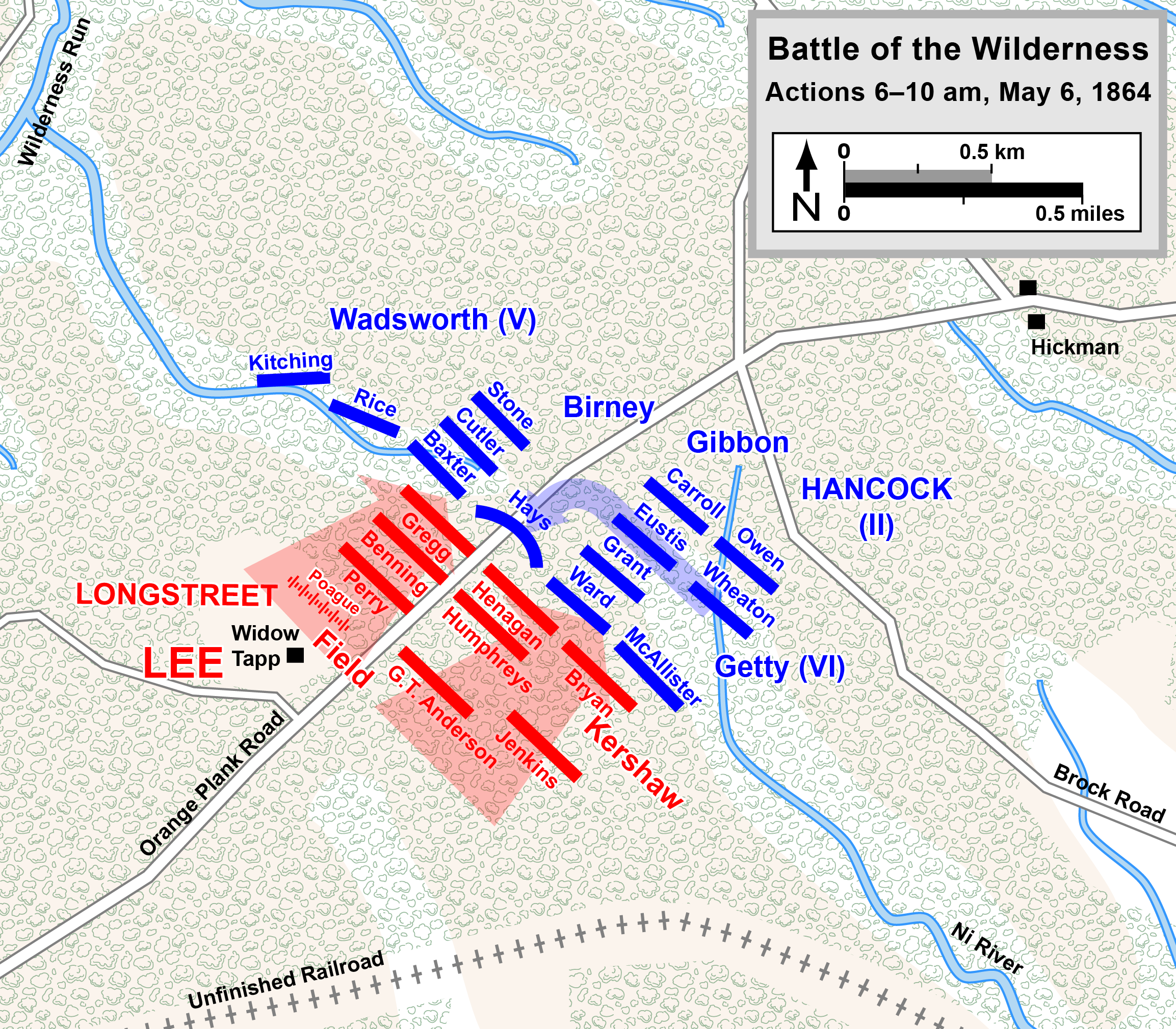
Longstreet counterattacks.

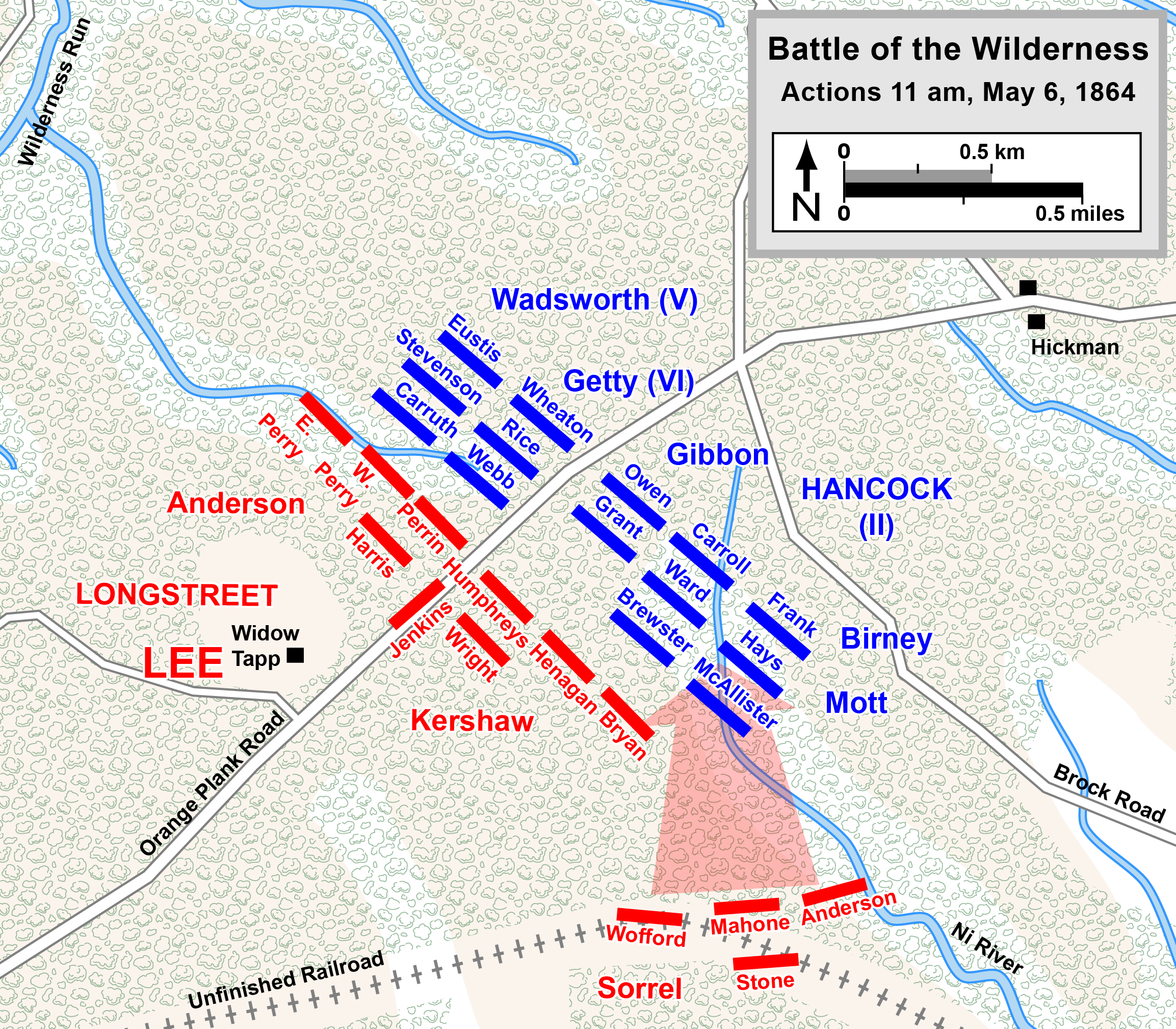
Longstreet attacks Hancock's flank.

Starting from near Poague's guns, Longstreet counterattacked with the divisions of Major General Charles W. Field on the left and Brigadier General Joseph B. Kershaw on the right. A series of attacks by both sides caused the front line to move back and forth between the Widow Tapp farm and Brock Road. The Texans, leading the charge north of the road, fought gallantly at a heavy price—only 250 of the 800 men emerged unscathed. Field's division drove back Wadsworth's force on the north side of the Widow Tapp farm, while Kershaw's division fought along the road. Although Wadsworth and his brigadier Rice tried to restore order near the front, most of his troops fled to the Lacy House and were done fighting for the remainder of the battle.

At 10:00 am, Lee's chief engineer, Major General Martin L. Smith, reported to Longstreet that he had explored an unfinished railroad bed south of the Plank Road and that it offered easy access to the Union left flank. The flank was unguarded due to a mix-up in orders. Hancock had ordered John Gibbon to take his division into action and hit Longstreet's flank but the order was not acted upon. Gibbon to his dying day insisted he never got the order and it has never been satisfactorily determined if the courier carrying it got lost or if Gibbon saw the order and misunderstood it. Longstreet assigned his aide, Lieutenant Colonel Moxley Sorrel, to the task of leading three fresh brigades for a surprise attack. An additional brigade, which was reduced in strength from the morning's fighting, volunteered to join them. Sorrel and the senior brigade commander, Brigadier General William Mahone, struck at 11:00 am while Longstreet resumed his main attack. The Union line was broken and driven back, Wadsworth was mortally wounded, and Hancock reorganized his line in trenches near the Brock Road. Hancock wrote later that the flanking attack rolled up his line "like a wet blanket".

Meanwhile, Burnside had gotten the IX Corps into action—three divisions and six infantry brigades in an attempt to break the Confederate center, but after a fierce firefight with elements of Hill's corps, they were fought to a stalemate along the Plank Road with no less than ten regimental commanders being killed, wounded, or captured. By noon, a Confederate victory seemed likely. Longstreet rode forward on the Orange Plank Road with several of his officers while another fire caused Mahone's 12th Virginia Infantry Regiment to become separated from its brigade. An aide suggested that Longstreet was too close to the front, but his advice was disregarded. As the Virginians moved through the woods back to the road, their brigade mistook them for Union soldiers, and the two Confederate forces began shooting at each other. Longstreet's mounted party was caught in the crossfire, and Longstreet was severely wounded in his neck. Brigadier General Micah Jenkins, aide-de-camp Captain Alfred E. Doby and orderly Marcus Baum were killed. Longstreet was able to turn over his command directly to division commander Field and told him to "Press the enemy." (Note: By coincidence, Longstreet was accidentally shot by his own men just three miles (4.8 km) from the place where Confederate Lieutenant General Stonewall Jackson suffered the same fate a year earlier.) Burnside finally arrived on the Confederate northern flank with three brigades, and attacked around 2:00 pm. His fighting for the day, beginning against Colonel William F. Perry's Alabama Brigade, was a standoff. Lee organized another attack on Hancock around 4:15 pm that Hancock repelled in about an hour. This attack chiefly fell upon Brig. Gen Gershom Mott's division, the former command of Joe Hooker, which was once an elite unit but is now considered one of the weakest in the army and fell back in disorder. Hancock sent in Colonel Samuel Sprigg Carroll's brigade of Gibbon's division, and they repulsed the attack. Another fire threatened the wounded in the woods and Hancock's breastworks, as fighting on the Orange Plank Road front gradually ended near evening. The following day, Lee appointed Richard Anderson to temporary command of the First Corps.

=== Gordon attacks at the Orange Turnpike ===
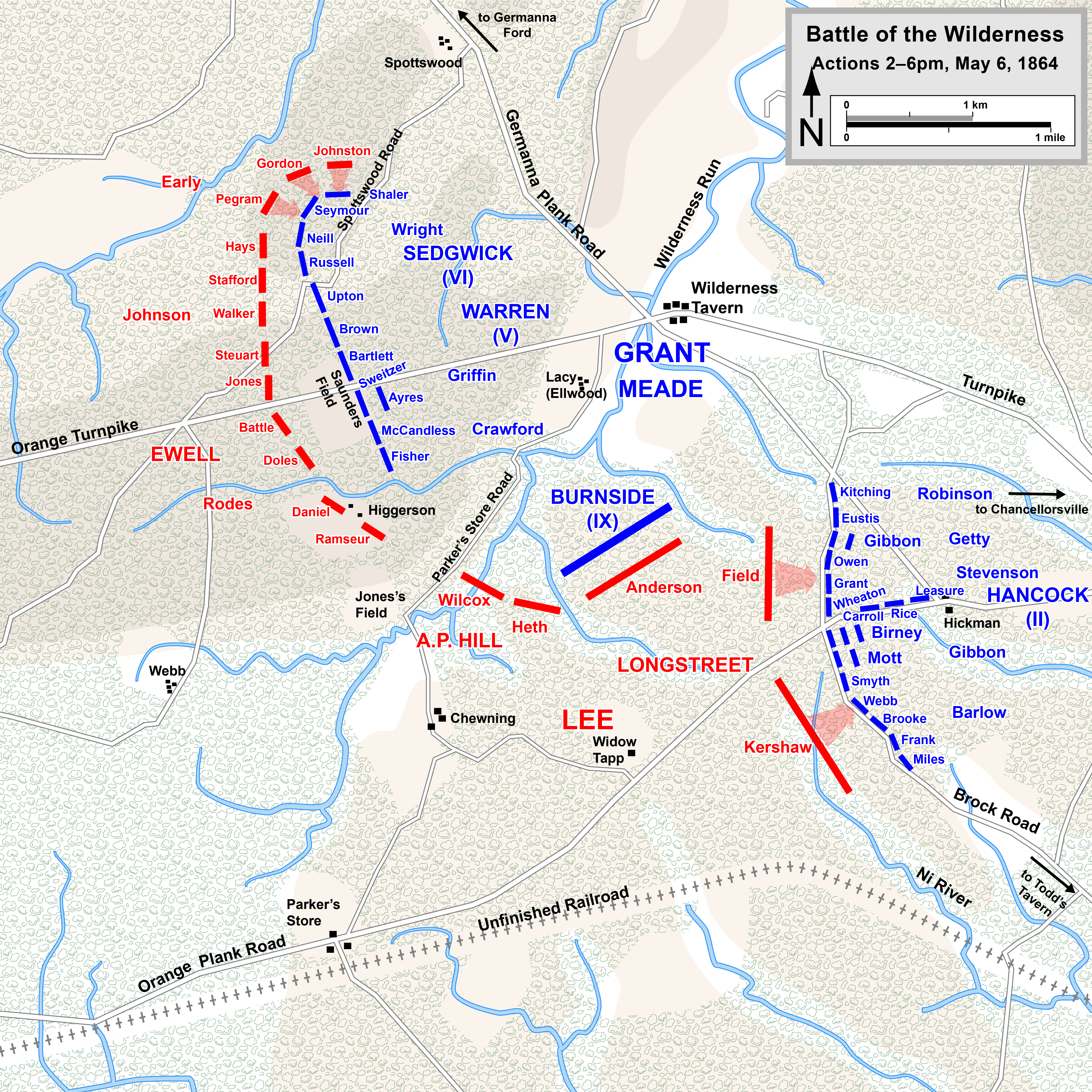
Gordon flank attack, Burnside arrives, and Confederate attack stalls on Orange Plank Road.

At the Orange Turnpike, inconclusive fighting proceeded for most of the day. During the morning, Gordon scouted the Union line and recommended to his division commander, Jubal Early, that he conduct a flanking attack in Sedgwick's right. This was held by the two-brigade division of Maj. Gen James B. Ricketts, formerly the command of General Robert Milroy, which had been routed by the Confederates eleven months earlier at the Second Battle of Winchester. They carried the taint of that defeat and were widely nicknamed "Milroy's weary boys". Early initially dismissed the venture as too risky, and Ewell did not have enough men to attack until 1:00 pm when the brigade of Brigadier General Robert D. Johnston arrived. Gordon's attack was authorized around 5:30 pm. The attack went well and caused some of the men in the Union brigade commanded by Brigadier General Alexander Shaler to simply run away. Shaler and another brigade commander, Brigadier General Truman Seymour, were captured. Sedgwick was almost captured, and his horse was injured, while the color-bearer standing next to him was shot. The Union line fell back about a mile (1.6 km) while the two generals and several hundred men were captured. Eventually the darkness and the dense foliage took their toll as the Union flank received reinforcements and recovered. Sedgwick's line was extended overnight to the Germanna Plank Road. (Note: For years after the war, Gordon complained about the delay in approving his attack, claiming "the greatest opportunity ever presented to Lee's army was permitted to pass." According to Gordon's account in 1903 (after Lee, Ewell, and Early were all dead), Lee ordered Ewell to approve Gordon's plan. However, other sources discount Lee's personal intervention.)

Reports of the collapse of this part of the Union line caused great consternation at Grant's headquarters, leading to an interchange that is widely quoted in Grant biographies. An officer accosted Grant, proclaiming, "General Grant, this is a crisis that cannot be looked upon too seriously. I know Lee's methods well by past experience; he will throw his whole army between us and the Rapidan, and cut us off completely from our communications." Grant seemed to be waiting for such an opportunity and snapped, "Oh, I am heartily tired of hearing about what Lee is going to do. Some of you always seem to think he is suddenly going to turn a double somersault, and land in our rear and on both of our flanks at the same time. Go back to your command, and try to think what we are going to do ourselves, instead of what Lee is going to do."

=== Cavalry ===
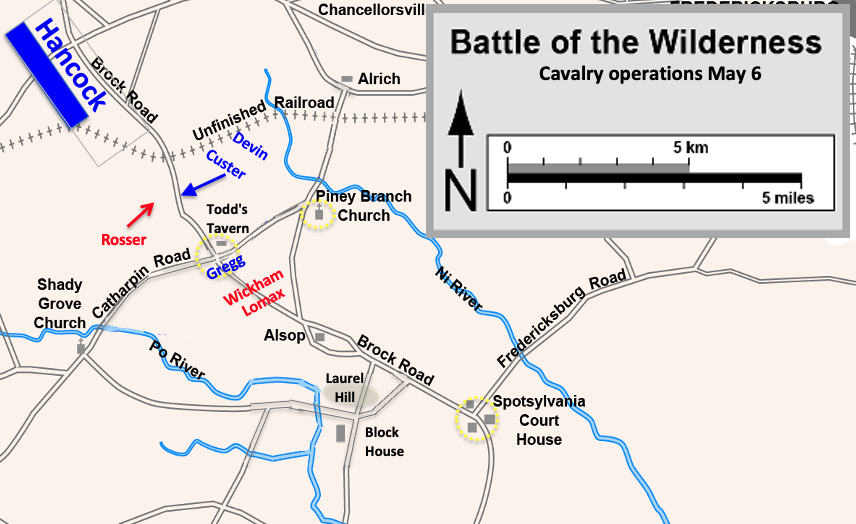
Hancock was kept blind on his left, and the Union Army's route to Spotsylvania Court House was blocked.

Custer's First Brigade reached Brock Road at about daylight on May 6. Custer extended his right toward Hancock and his left toward Gregg's 2nd Division at Todd's Tavern. Torbert's Second Brigade, commanded by Colonel Thomas Devin, began the trip from Chancellorsville to join Custer's right, bringing a battery. Hancock's infantry was hard pressed by two divisions from Longstreet's corps, but he worried about the location of Longstreet's other two divisions. Although Hancock wanted Custer to move down Brock Road to look for Longstreet's other divisions, Custer was attacked after 8:00 am by Rosser's brigade. The arrival of Devin with his six-gun battery plus two more guns from Gregg turned the fight in Custer's favor, and Rosser backed off.

Hancock still did not know what was behind the Confederate cavalry, and he kept a substantial portion of his corps outside of the fighting with Longstreet to protect his left. (Note: Union leadership was concerned about additional divisions, other than the two on the Orange Plank Road, from Longstreet's First Corps. Pickett's Division, which leadership believed was with Longstreet, was detached for garrison duty near Richmond.) While Custer was fighting, Gregg was fighting Wickham's brigade on the Brock Road near Todd's Tavern. This effectively blocked the Union Army from Spotsylvania Court House. Concern after Hancock's left had been turned by Longstreet's surprise attack from the unfinished railroad caused the Union leadership to order the cavalry to withdraw. At 2:30 pm, Gregg was ordered to withdraw to Piney Branch Church, and Custer and Devin were sent further east back to Catharine Furnace.

== Fighting ends ==
On the morning of May 7, Grant was faced with the prospect of attacking strong Confederate earthworks. His cavalry was south of the infantry fighting in the Battle of Todd's Tavern. (Note: Some historians use May 5–6 as the date for the battle, as there was little infantry fighting on May 7 and the cavalry was fighting in the Battle of Todd's Tavern. However, Grant's casualties report uses May 5 through May 7.) Instead of more infantry attacks, Grant chose to maneuver. By moving south on the Brock Road, he hoped to reach the crossroads at Spotsylvania Court House, which would interpose his army between Lee and Richmond, forcing Lee to fight on ground more advantageous to the Union army. He ordered preparations for a night march on May 7 that would reach Spotsylvania, 10 miles (16 km) to the southeast, by the morning of May 8. Once Lee found out Grant was moving south instead of turning back, he correctly predicted Grant would move to Spotsylvania Court House. Lee got his army there first, and erected formidable earthworks. Grant's infantry fought the Battle of Spotsylvania Court House before maneuvering yet again as the campaign continued south toward Richmond.

=== Casualties ===
Forest fires raged; ammunition trains exploded; the dead were roasted in the conflagration; the wounded, roused by its hot breath, dragged themselves along, with their torn and mangled limbs, in the mad energy of despair, to escape the ravages of the flames; and every bush seemed hung with shreds of blood-stained clothing....

— Lt. Col. Horace Porter, Grant's staff

With over 28,000 casualties, the Battle of the Wilderness ranks in the top five American Civil War battles in terms of casualties for both sides combined. (Note: The National Park Service lists the Battle of the Wilderness as having the third-highest number of casualties in the American Civil War, exceeded only by the Battle of Gettysburg and Battle of Chickamauga. The American Battlefield Trust lists the battle as fourth–highest. Statista also ranks the battle as fourth–highest.) The official report for the Union listed 2,246 officers and men killed, 12,037 wounded, and 3,383 captured or missing—a total of 17,666 casualties for the Union side of the battle. Historian Gordon C. Rhea notes that this number is probably larger, since a lieutenant witnessed Warren lowering the number of casualties reported. (Note: Lieutenant Morris Schaff wrote that he witnessed Warren working with casualty figures. He wrote "It is needless to say that after that I always doubted reports of casualties until officially certified.") Other Union casualty estimates are typically between 17,500 and 18,000. (Note: Historians Ron Chernow and James M. McPherson use 17,500 for the Union casualties, while the American Battlefield Trust uses "more than 17,500". Eicher uses the official numbers, and the National Park Service battle detail uses 18,000. Historian Colonel Vincent J. Esposito uses "between 15,000 and 18,000".) Based on correspondence from Grant, at least six brigadier generals were among the Union casualties. Wadsworth and Alexander Hays were killed, Seymour and Shaler were taken prisoner, and Getty and Bartlett were wounded.

Young's study reveals Confederate casualties of 1,477 killed, 7,866 wounded, and 1,690 missing, for a total of 11,033 casualties. Among the wounded are 233 wounded and captured—they are counted herein in the wounded total and not double-counted in the missing category. This study is close to some of the estimates made by other sources. (Note: Confederate casualties are difficult to list because only 112 of 183 regiments engaged reported. Total casualties are typically estimated to be around 11,000 (close to Young's study), and that figure is used by Rhea who states that "independent Confederate reports lend some support to that estimate". Eicher and Esposito use a range of 7,750 to 11,400, while McPherson says less than 10,500. The National Park Service battle detail uses 10,800, while the American Battlefield Trust uses 13,000.) Like the Union, Lee lost some generals. His report at the end of May 5 concluded with the "gallant Brig. Gen. J. M. Jones was killed, and Brig. Gen. L. A. Stafford, I fear, mortally wounded while leading his command with conspicuous valor." His evening report for May 6 mentions the wounding of Longstreet and Brigadier General John Pegram, and the death of Jenkins.

== Aftermath ==
=== Performance and impact ===
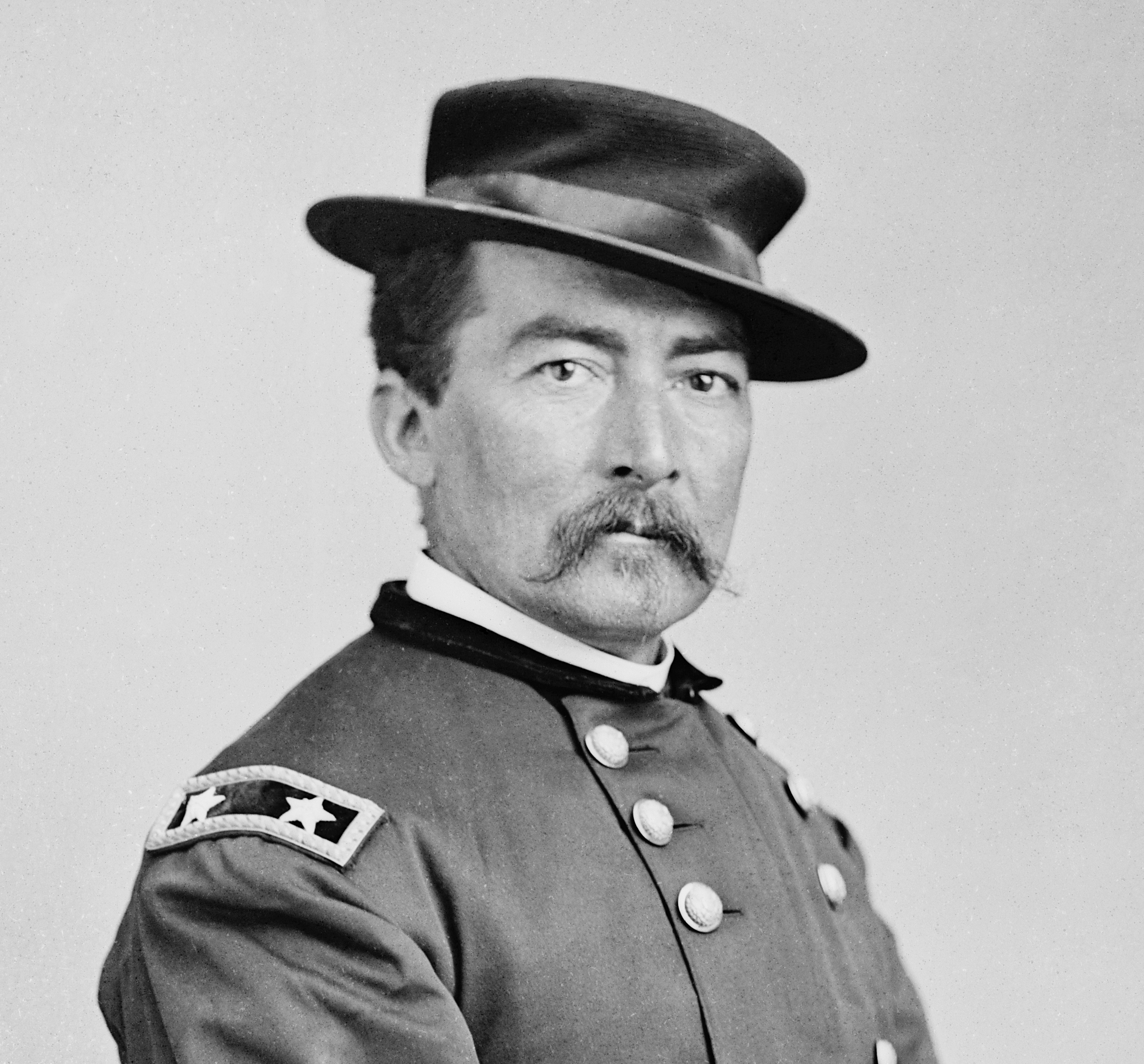
Maj. Gen. Philip Sheridan

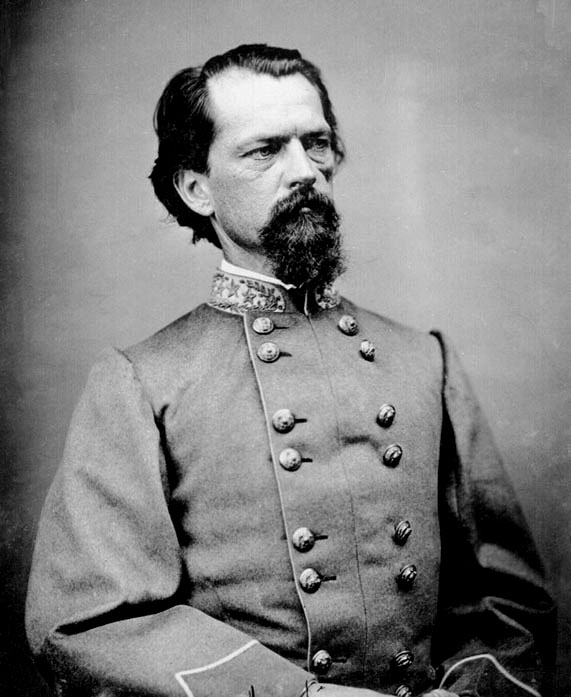
Brig. Gen. John B. Gordon

Criticisms of the Union performance revolve around the "woefully inadequate" cavalry positioning. The decision to have Sheridan's most inexperienced general, Wilson, lead the smallest cavalry division to scout the Union army's right flank was not a good one. Wilson's 3rd Cavalry Division was not of sufficient size to screen the Union front by itself, and Wilson got his division cut off from the remainder of the Union Army. Earlier, Wilson's inexperience caused him to fail to leave pickets on the Orange Turnpike—resulting in a surprise for the Union infantry and contributing to the Union Army being forced to fight in the Wilderness. Additionally, the decision to have the cavalry abandon Todd's Tavern on May 6 led to a delay in getting the Union army to Spotsylvania Court House. A few of the cavalry's regimental commanders fought well, such as Hammond, Brinton, and the 1st New Jersey Cavalry Regiment's lieutenant colonel, John W. Kester. The performance of the Union infantry was also below expectations, and all four corps commanders accomplished little.

Discussions of the Confederate performance revolve around Lee, Longstreet, and Gordon. Lee put Ewell's and Hill's corps in good position to face Meade, but kept Longstreet's First Corps too far away. Hill and Ewell defended well on May 5 against enemy forces that were larger. Lee's decision to let Hill's Third Corps men to rest on the evening of May 5 instead of reforming their lines was called by historian Peter S. Carmichael "a horrendous decision, maybe the worst of his career". Longstreet's men fought well under his direction, but they enjoyed only brief success after Longstreet retired from the field wounded. Longstreet, surely aware that Jackson was mortally wounded by friendly-fire in the same Wilderness a year earlier, disregarded advice and rode into friendly fire where he was wounded and others were killed. Ewell and his Second Corps defended well, and the criticism of Ewell and Early by Gordon for delaying his flanking maneuver is not justified. Early had received (incorrect) intelligence that the Union IX Corps was moving between the river and the Confederate left flank, which contributed to his caution against using his outnumbered troops to attack the entrenched Union infantry.

The Battle of the Wilderness had no obvious winner, and neither side was driven from the battlefield. The National Park Service calls the battle "indecisive". One historian says that Lee won a victory because he fought Grant to a standoff, but he also adds that the battle was a failure for the Confederacy because it was unable to maintain the initiative and Lee's offensive capacity was eliminated. A major point discussed by historians is that after the battle, Grant did not retreat north across the nearest river—like other leaders earlier in the war. (Note: Unlike his predecessors, Grant did not retreat; this is discussed, or at least mentioned, by historians Chernow, Gary W. Gallagher, McPherson, Rhea, Brooks D. Simpson, and Stephen Z. Starr.) Instead, the Union army continued south, presenting a threat to Lee's army and the Confederate capital city of Richmond. This was the first time in a Virginia campaign that the Army of the Potomac continued on the offensive after an initial battle, and morale was boosted to the point that the Union soldiers sang as they marched south. Sherman called this movement "the grandest act of [Grant's] life", and added that he now felt "that the rebellion will be crushed". The battle confirmed a warning made by Longstreet to Lee about Grant, that he would fight "every day and every hour till the end of the war". By April 1865, Lee's army needed supplies and his men were starving. His army was trapped between Sheridan's and Meade's forces. On April 9, 1865, Lee surrendered his army to Grant after the Battle of Appomattox Courthouse.

=== Preservation ===
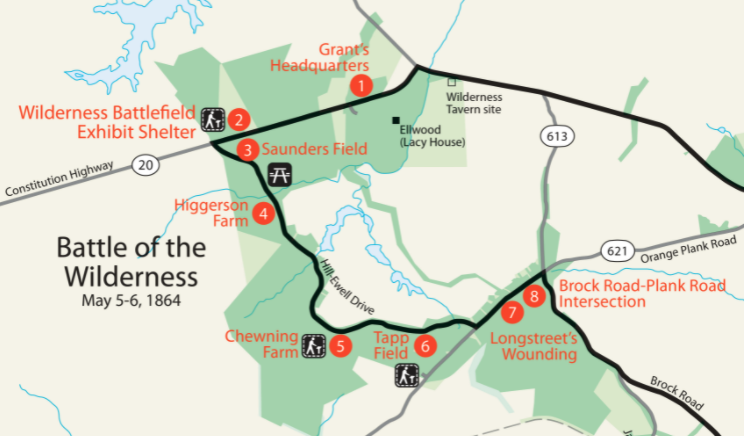
Portion of the Fredericksburg and Spotsylvania National Military Park

Portions of the Wilderness battlefield are preserved as part of Fredericksburg and Spotsylvania National Military Park. The park was established in 1927 to memorialize the battlefields of Fredericksburg, Chancellorsville, Spotsylvania Court House, and the Wilderness. The Wilderness battlefield is located on the western side of the park, while the other battlefields are all further east in the park.

In addition to the land that has been protected by the National Park Service, two major volunteer organizations have been active in preservation activities. The Friends of the Wilderness Battlefield have been active in helping to preserve and enhance Ellwood Manor (the Lacy House), which was the headquarters for Major General Warren during the battle and is the site of a family cemetery where Confederate Lieutenant General Stonewall Jackson's arm was buried. The American Battlefield Trust has saved more than 294 acres (119 ha) through mid-2023.
