= Wilderness (novel) =

Novel by Robert B. Parker

First edition (publ. Delacorte Press)

Wilderness is a novel by American writer Robert B. Parker.

== Plot summary ==
At 46, Aaron Newman was enjoying the good things in life - a good marriage, a good job - and he was in good shape himself. Then he saw the murder. A petty vicious killing that was to plunge him into an insane jungle of raw violence and fear, threatening and defiling the things he cared about.

Wilderness is a stand alone novel and not part of the Spenser universe.

== Reviews ==
"A novel of violence, crisp dialogue, and suspense . . . the reader is immediately caught up in the ambience of danger."—The Boston Globe
