= O'Day 40 =

Sailboat class

Development
- Designer: C. Raymond Hunt Associates; Philippe Briand
- Location: United States
- Year: 1986
- No. built: 180
- Builder: O'Day Corp.
- Role: Cruiser
- Name: O'Day 40

Boat
- Displacement: 18,000 lb (8,165 kg)
- Draft: 6.30 ft (1.92 m)

Hull
- Type: monohull
- Construction: fiberglass
- LOA: 39.58 ft (12.06 m)
- LWL: 33.50 ft (10.21 m)
- Beam: 12.60 ft (3.84 m)
- Engine: Westerbeke 46 hp (34 kW) diesel engine

Hull appendages
- Keel: fin keel
- Ballast: 6,600 lb (2,994 kg)
- Rudder: spade-type rudder

Rig
- Rig type: Bermuda rig
- I foretriangle height: 50.62 ft (15.43 m)
- J foretriangle base: 15.21 ft (4.64 m)
- P mainsail luff: 44.28 ft (13.50 m)
- E mainsail foot: 14.17 ft (4.32 m)

Sails
- Sailplan: masthead sloop
- Mainsail area: 313.72 sq ft (29.146 m^{2})
- Jib/genoa area: 384.97 sq ft (35.765 m^{2})
- Total sail area: 698.69 sq ft (64.910 m^{2})

The O'Day 40 is an American sailboat that was designed by C. Raymond Hunt Associates and Philippe Briand as a cruiser and first built in 1986.

The boat is a development of the Sun Fizz 40, which was licensed by Jeanneau and developed into the O'Day 39 for production in the US. C. Raymond Hunt Associates then took Briand's design and further developed it into the O'Day 40, with the addition of a suger-scoop transom and a revised interior. Both Jeanneau and the O'Day Corp. were owned by US conglomerate Bangor Punta at the time.

== Production ==
The design was built by O'Day Corp., a division of the Bangor Punta Corp., in the United States. It was built starting in 1986, with 180 boats completed and replaced the O'Day 39 in production.

== Design ==
The O'Day 40 is a recreational keelboat, built predominantly of fiberglass, with wood trim. It has a masthead sloop rig, a raked stem, a step-down reverse transom with a small swimming platform, an internally mounted spade-type rudder controlled by a wheel and a fixed fin keel or optional shoal draft keel. The fin keel version displaces 18,000 lb (8,165 kg) and carries 6,600 lb (2,994 kg) of ballast, while the shoal draft version displaces 18,500 lb (8,391 kg).

The boat has a draft of 6.30 ft (1.92 m) with the standard keel and 4.90 ft (1.49 m) with the optional shoal draft keel.

Starting with serial number 135 the boats were delivered with a mast that was about 1.72 ft (0.52 m) taller.

The boat is fitted with a Westerbeke 46 hp (34 kW) diesel engine for docking and maneuvering. The fuel tank holds 40 U.S. gallons (150 L; 33 imp gal) and the fresh water tank has a capacity of 107 U.S. gallons (410 L; 89 imp gal).

The boat has sleeping accommodation for up to seven people, with a double "V"-berth in the bow cabin, a large U-shaped settee around a drop-down table and a straight settee in the main cabin and an aft cabin on the starboard side with a double berth. The galley is located on the port side just forward of the companionway ladder. The galley has a "U"-shape and is equipped with a two-burner stove, an ice box and a double sink. A navigation station is opposite the galley, on the starboard side. The head is located just aft of the bow cabin on the port side and includes a shower.

The design has a hull speed of 7.76 kn (14.37 km/h).

== See also ==
- List of sailing boat types

Related development

- O'Day 39
- Sun Fizz 40
