= Ranger 29 =

Sailboat class

Development
- Designer: Gary Mull
- Location: United States
- Year: 1971
- Builder: Ranger Yachts
- Name: Ranger 29

Boat
- Displacement: 6,700 lb (3,039 kg)
- Draft: 4.67 ft (1.42 m)

Hull
- Type: Monohull
- Construction: Fiberglass
- LOA: 28.58 ft (8.71 m)
- LWL: 23.00 ft (7.01 m)
- Beam: 9.33 ft (2.84 m)
- Engine: Universal Atomic 4 30 hp (22 kW) gasoline engine

Hull appendages
- Keel: fin keel
- Ballast: 3,130 lb (1,420 kg)
- Rudder: internally-mounted spade-type skeg rudder

Rig
- General: Masthead sloop
- I foretriangle height: 37.00 ft (11.28 m)
- J foretriangle base: 12.33 ft (3.76 m)
- P mainsail luff: 33.00 ft (10.06 m)
- E mainsail foot: 11.00 ft (3.35 m)

Sails
- Mainsail area: 181.50 sq ft (16.862 m^{2})
- Jib/genoa area: 228.11 sq ft (21.192 m^{2})
- Total sail area: 409.61 sq ft (38.054 m^{2})

Racing
- PHRF: 186 (average)

The Ranger 29 is an American sailboat, that was designed by Gary Mull and first built in 1971.

The boat can be confused with the Philip Rhodes' 1960 Rhodes Ranger 29 design.

== Production ==
The boat was built by Ranger Yachts in the United States from 1971 to 1975 and is now out of production.

The design was replaced in production by the Mull-designed Ranger 28.

== Design ==
The Ranger 29 is a small recreational keelboat, built predominantly of fiberglass. It has a masthead sloop rig, an internally-mounted spade-type rudder mounted on a skeg and a fixed fin keel. It displaces 6,700 lb (3,039 kg) and carries 3,130 lb (1,420 kg) of lead ballast. The boat has a draft of 4.67 ft (1.42 m) with the standard keel.

The boat is fitted with a Universal Atomic 4 gasoline engine of 30 hp (22 kW).

The boat has a PHRF racing average handicap of 186 with a high of 195 and low of 180. It has a hull speed of 6.43 kn (11.91 km/h).

== See also ==
- List of sailing boat types
