= Ranger 33 =

American sailboat designed by Gary Mull

Development
- Designer: Gary Mull
- Location: United States
- Year: 1969
- No. built: 464
- Builder: Ranger Yachts (a division of Bangor Punta)
- Name: Ranger 33

Boat
- Displacement: 10,500 lb (4,763 kg)
- Draft: 5.0 ft (1.5 m)

Hull
- Type: Monohull
- Construction: Fiberglass
- LOA: 33.17 ft (10.11 m)
- LWL: 26.25 ft (8.00 m)
- Beam: 9.58 ft (2.92 m)
- Engine: Universal Atomic 4 30 hp (22 kW) gasoline engine

Hull appendages
- Keel: fin keel
- Ballast: 4,500 lb (2,041 kg)
- Rudder: internally-mounted spade-type rudder

Rig
- General: Fractional rigged sloop Masthead sloop
- I foretriangle height: 41.50 ft (12.65 m)
- J foretriangle base: 13.87 ft (4.23 m)
- P mainsail luff: 35.00 ft (10.67 m)
- E mainsail foot: 13.75 ft (4.19 m)

Sails
- Mainsail area: 240.63 sq ft (22.355 m^{2})
- Jib/genoa area: 287.80 sq ft (26.737 m^{2})
- Total sail area: 528.43 sq ft (49.093 m^{2})

Racing
- PHRF: 156 (average)

The Ranger 33 is an American sailboat, that was designed by Gary Mull and first built in 1969. The design is out of production.

== Production ==
The boat was built by Ranger Yachts, a division of Bangor Punta, in the United States starting in 1969. A total of 464 examples were completed by the time production ended in 1978.

== Design ==
The Ranger 33 is a small recreational keelboat, built predominantly of fiberglass, with wood trim. It has a masthead sloop rig, an internally-mounted spade-type rudder and a fixed fin keel. It displaces 10,500 lb (4,763 kg) and carries 4,500 lb (2,041 kg) of lead ballast. The boat has a draft of 5.00 ft (1.52 m) with the standard keel.

The boat is fitted with a Universal Atomic 4 30 hp (22 kW) gasoline engine, although later during production a Universal diesel engine was also offered as an option. It has a 21 U.S. gallons (79 L; 17 imp gal) fuel tank and a 21 U.S. gallons (79 L; 17 imp gal) fresh water tank.

On earlier models tiller steering was standard with wheel steering optional, but wheel steering later became standard.

The boat has a hull speed of 6.87 kn (12.72 km/h).

== Variants ==
Ranger 33
Standard model with a PHRF racing average handicap of 156 with a high of 162 and low of 150.
Ranger 33 SM
Short mast model with a mast about 3.5 ft (1.1 m) shorter. Its PHRF racing average handicap of 159 with a high of 162 and low of 156.

== Operational history ==
In a 2003 Latitude 38 review Andy Turpin concluded, "the time-honored Ranger 33 is by no means a superyacht or a speed demon, nor was her design particularly radical. She is simply, in Gary Mull's words, 'a really nice little boat' which meets all the design criteria he held in high esteem three decades ago: she's good looking, well-balanced and sails well on all points of sail. She has a bright, airy interior, plus a comfortable cockpit, and is easily converted from racer to cruiser and back again with minimal effort. No doubt she'll remain on the plastic classic honor roll for many years to come."

== See also ==
- List of sailing boat types
