= Bill Lear =

American businessman and inventor

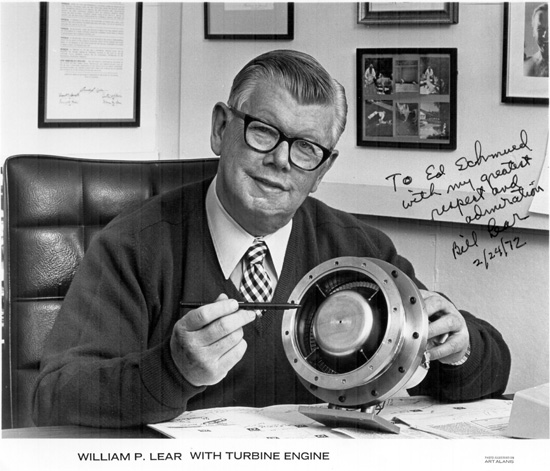
- Born: William Powell Lear; June 26, 1902; Hannibal, Missouri, U.S.
- Died: May 14, 1978 (aged 75); Reno, Nevada, U.S.
- Other name: William P. Lear
- Occupations: Engineer, inventor
- Known for: Car radio, 8-track tape, Learjet
- Spouses: Ethel Peterson; Madeline Murphy (m. 1926); Margret Radell; Moya Olsen (m. 1941)
- Children: 7, including John Olsen Lear
- Awards: Collier Trophy (1949); Horatio Alger Award (1954); Elliott Cresson Medal (1972)

William Powell Lear (June 26, 1902 – May 14, 1978) was an American inventor and businessman. He is best known for founding Learjet, a manufacturer of business jets. He also invented the battery eliminator for the B battery, and developed the car radio and the 8-track cartridge, an audio tape system. Throughout his career of 46 years, Lear received over 140 patents.

== Career ==
Lear was born on June 26, 1902, in Hannibal, Missouri, to Rueben Marion Lear, a carpenter, and Gertrude Elizabeth Powell Lear. His mother left his father and he stayed with his aunt, Gussie Bornhouser, in Dubuque, Iowa. Later, Otto Kirmse took him in and raised him as his stepson. The family relocated to Chicago where Lear attended Kershaw Grammar School. On Sundays, he attended the Moody Tabernacle (now Moody Church); however, he ceased any further church affiliation after this experience. Journalist Victor Boesen, Lear biographer, wrote:

"From listening to Paul Rader, of the Moody Tabernacle, he learned grammar and how to speak. He found out how to meet people, how to shake hands, and what to say when he did so... he learned about hypocrisy, too."

While in Chicago, Lear was employed briefly at a local airfield. He spent one summer with his father in Tulsa, re-building a Model-T car. Too independent to move back with his mother in Chicago, Lear struck out cross country. He joined the U.S. Navy and was sent to Great Lakes Naval Training Station. After discharge, and with a young family, "he decided to complete his high school education. Starting a radio repair shop in his home, which he could tend nights, Lear enrolled at Tulsa Central High School, taking eight solids, heavy on the math. He was at the point of wrapping up the entire four-year curriculum in one, when he was again dismissed for showing up teachers."

=== Radio engineer ===
Lear was self-taught: "He had read widely on Wireless. He had built a radio set, based on a twenty-five-cent Galena crystal which he sent away for, and he had learned the Morse code, the fun ending with the ban on radio during World War I."

One of his first ventures was with Lawrence Sorensen, selling "Loose Coupler" radios. Lear had been an "instructor in wireless" in the U.S. Navy so he confidently identified himself as a radio engineer to Clifford Reid in Quincy, Illinois. Reid was selling auto supplies and hired Lear to expand into radio. With contractor Julius Bergen, he founded Quincy Radio Labs and built speaker boxes for radios. Lear also helped develop WLAL which evolved into the powerful station KVOO.

In 1924, he moved to Chicago and built a B-battery eliminator for the Universal Battery Company with R. D. Morey. He met Waldorf Astoria Smith of the Carter Radio Company who helped him with radio theory. Tom Fletcher of the QRS Company was so impressed by Lear's radio set designed around a QRS rectifier tube that he hired him, offering 60% more pay than Universal Battery. Bill Grunow of the Grigsby-Grunow-Hinds Company topped that offer when Lear fixed a problem with 60,000 B-battery eliminators that they had manufactured. He came up with an invention in 1924 when power inverters installed at Stevens Hotel failed to perform for the Radio Manufacturers' Association. Lear also built audio amplifiers and cases for Magnavox speakers. The Magnavox "majestic dynamic speakers" that he produced with Grunow were very popular.

Lear pioneered an early step toward miniaturization in electronics. Tuning coils in the radio frequency stage of a set were rather large; Lear reduced their size by using Litz wire, braided from many fine strands to create a large surface area, giving it high conductivity at radio frequency. Lear borrowed $5,000 from his friend Algot Olson to build machines to wrap the strands, braid the wire, and wind the coils. The industry was set up in the basement of his mother's old house on 65th street, and run with assistance of Don Mitchell, a railroad electrician. Lear called the company Radio Coil and Wire Corporation. Eugene F. McDonald of Zenith Electronics ordered 50,000 coils, which were one-quarter the size of coils made with solid wire.

Lear traded his Radio Coil business for one-third interest in Paul Galvin's Galvin Manufacturing Company. At that time the radio had not yet been developed for use in automobiles. Lear worked with his friend Elmer Wavering to build the first car radio. Lear partnered with Howard Gates of Zenith; Lear designed the circuit and layout, Gates did the metal work, and Lear completed the assembly. Galvin initially dismissed the prototype, but later ordered a 200-unit production run. Galvin and Lear mulled over names for the product on a cross-country trip and came up with "Motorola", which was a portmanteau of "motor" and the then popular suffix "-ola" used with audio equipment of the time (for example "Victrola"). The product was such a success that Galvin changed the name of his entire company to Motorola.

=== Aviation ===
In 1931, Lear bought his first aircraft, a Fleet biplane for $2,500 (equivalent to $53,000 in 2025) from a woman in Dearborn, Michigan. The challenges of aerial navigation led Lear into the development of radio direction finders and avionics products.

Lear founded Lear Developments, a company specializing in aerospace instruments and electronics. Lear developed radio direction finders, autopilots, and the first fully automatic aircraft landing system. He was awarded the Collier Trophy for this contribution in 1949.

Lear also developed and marketed a line of panel-mounted radios for general aviation. His "LearAvian" series of portable radios, which incorporated radio direction finder circuits as well as broadcast band coverage, were especially popular. The company earned about $100 million during WW II for its products.

Lear changed the name of Lear Developments to Lear Avia, Inc. in 1939. The company rebranded again in 1944 to Lear, Incorporated and in 1949 opened a manufacturing facility in Santa Monica, California.

In 1960, Lear moved to Switzerland and founded the Swiss American Aviation Company (SAAC). The company's goal was to redesign the FFA P-16 jet fighter—a project that had been abandoned after two crashes during test flights—into a small business jet, the SAAC 23.

During the brief existence of SAAC, King Michael I of Romania met Lear and agreed to work as a test pilot for the Swiss part of the company. This was during the king's forced exile, which lasted for 50 years until 1997.

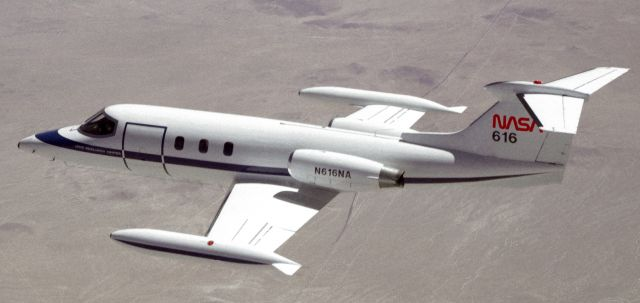
Learjet 25, an example of the Lear executive jets that still bear his name

In 1962, Lear sold his interest in Lear, Incorporated to the Siegler Corporation after failing to persuade Lear Incorporated's board to go into the aircraft manufacturing business. The resulting company was thereafter known as Lear Siegler.

Lear next moved to Wichita, Kansas, to manufacture the converted SAAC 23 design. In October 1963, Lear Jet started test flights on the Learjet 23, the first mass-produced business jet. The first Lear Jet was sold in 1963; it could carry eight passengers at 560 mph and cost about $650,000 fully equipped (equivalent to $6,800,000 in 2025), about $400,000 less than its competitors at the time. Although the Lear Jet was quite successful and remains in production, Bill Lear was eventually forced to sell Lear Jet Corporation to the Gates Rubber Company in 1967 due to other financial losses.

In the early 1970s, Lear backed the Foxjet ST600 with its first order. The Very Light Jet project failed, but the VLJ concept became popular again 30 years later.

In 1976, Lear sold an option to his LearStar concept to Canadair, a Montreal aircraft manufacturer. The idea was to design an executive aircraft which would bring together a supercritical wing with Lycoming's new turbofan engine. However, the concept was only a very rough outline, prepared by a consultant. Although Canadair took up its option, Lear eventually realized that the Canadians had simply been interested in using his reputation and skills at promotion to penetrate the market. Canadair's design had little relation to Lear's concept, and Lear had no role in its development. Nevertheless, the Canadair Challenger business jet was to have a long career, with several variants. Bombardier Aerospace, by that time the parent company of Canadair, acquired Lear Jet in 1990.

One of Lear's most innovative projects was his last — a revolutionary aircraft called the LearAvia Lear Fan 2100, a seven-passenger aircraft whose single pusher propeller was powered by two turbine engines. The fuselage of this aircraft was made of lightweight composite materials, instead of the more typical aluminum alloys. The Lear Fan was ultimately never completed; at the time of his death Lear asked his wife, Moya, to finish it. With the help of investors she attempted to do so, but the aircraft failed to obtain FAA certification and so was never put into production.

== Other notable inventions ==
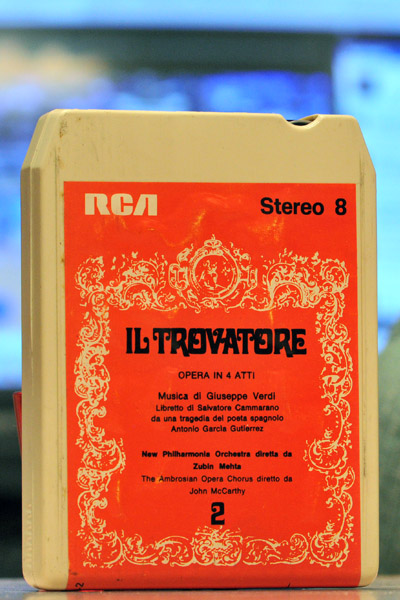
8-track tape

Lear developed the 8-track tape music cartridge in 1964. Lear's invention was an improvement on the four track Muntz Stereo-Pak tape cartridge, marketed by Earl "Madman" Muntz in California in 1962, itself a version of a 3-track system, Fidelipac. The 8-track was a commercial success that provided good audio quality and was easily adapted to vehicle and home use. The Lear Jet Stereo 8 Division offered home, auto, and portable versions. A popular theory is that Learjets also included 8-track players. In 1965, a partnership between Ford, RCA, and Lear offered the first pre-recorded 8-track music cartridges. RCA released the first Stereo 8 Tape Cartridges in September 1965, issuing 175 titles.

In 1968, Lear started work on a closed circuit steam turbine to power cars and buses. He built a transit bus, and converted a Chevrolet Monte Carlo sedan to use this turbine system. It used a proprietary working fluid dubbed Learium, possibly a chlorofluorocarbon similar to DuPont Freon. A prototype steam-powered racing car, dubbed the Lear Vapordyne, was built to enter the 1969 Indianapolis 500. The car never entered the race and never ran at competitive speeds.

== Personal life ==
=== Marriages and children ===
- With his first wife, Ethel Peterson Lear, daughter Mary Louise was born in January 1925.
- He married his second wife, Madeline Murphy, in October 1926. Their son, William Lear Jr., was born on May 24, 1928. Daughter Patti was born on June 26, 1929.
- Lear's third marriage, in February 1936, was to Margaret Jane Radell.
- In 1942, Lear married his fourth wife, Moya Marie Olsen. They had four children together: John Lear, Shanda, David and Tina.

Lear had a reputation for being difficult.

Lear's son, David, and ex-daughter-in-law, Merlene, appeared in a 2013 episode of the A&E reality show Hoarders, which mainly focused on Merlene.

== Death ==
The 75-year-old Lear died of leukemia in Reno, Nevada on May 14, 1978. His remains were cremated and scattered at sea.

== Tributes and honors ==
In 1944, Harry Bruno included William P. Lear in a list of 87 "all-time greats in American aviation ... [who] gambled their necks, their brains and their money – that aviation might grow."

- 1949, Collier Trophy for F-5 autopilot
- 1954, member Horatio Alger Association of Distinguished Americans
- 1967, appeared as himself in the film In Like Flint
- 1972, Elliott Cresson Medal
- 1972, Golden Plate Award of the American Academy of Achievement
- 1974, Tony Jannus Award for his distinguished contributions to aviation.
- 1978, National Aviation Hall of Fame
- 1981, International Air & Space Hall of Fame
- 1993, National Inventors Hall of Fame
- 2003, Hannibal Municipal Airport was renamed the Hannibal Regional Airport, William P. Lear Field in his honor.
- 2020, The National Endowment for the Humanities awarded the Museum of Flight a $236,000 grant to process and digitize the collected papers of William P. Lear and Moya Olsen Lear over a 2-year period.
