= Ranger 26-2 =

1980s US recreational keelboat

Development
- Designer: Gary Mull
- Location: United States
- Year: 1980; 46 years ago
- Builder: Ranger Yachts (division of Lear Siegler)
- Name: Ranger 26-2

Boat
- Crew: two
- Displacement: 3,000 lb (1,361 kg)
- Draft: 4.75 ft (1.45 m)

Hull
- Type: Monohull
- Construction: Fiberglass
- LOA: 26.00 ft (7.92 m)
- LWL: 19.79 ft (6.03 m)
- Beam: 8.00 ft (2.44 m)

Hull appendages
- Keel: lifting fin keel
- Ballast: lead
- Rudder: internally-mounted spade-type rudder

Rig
- General: Fractional rigged sloop
- I foretriangle height: 26.40 ft (8.05 m)
- J foretriangle base: 8.80 ft (2.68 m)
- P mainsail luff: 30.50 ft (9.30 m)
- E mainsail foot: 11.00 ft (3.35 m)

Sails
- Mainsail area: 167.75 sq ft (15.584 m^{2})
- Jib/genoa area: 116.16 sq ft (10.792 m^{2})
- Total sail area: 283.91 sq ft (26.376 m^{2})

Racing
- PHRF: 186 (average)

The Ranger 26-2 is a recreational keelboat built by Ranger Yachts, in the United States from 1980 until 1982. Ranger Yaxcjhts was a division of Lear Siegler at that time. Only a small number of boats of the design were completed and it is now out of production.

== Design ==
The Ranger 26-2 design is not related to the Ranger 26, which was designed by Mull in 1969.

The Ranger 26-2 is built predominantly of fiberglass. It has a fractional sloop rig, an internally-mounted spade-type rudder and a lifting keel. It displaces 3,000 lb (1,361 kg) and carries 1,140 lb (517 kg) of lead ballast.

The boat has a draft of 4.75 ft (1.45 m) with the retractable keel in the fully down position.

The boat has a PHRF racing average handicap of 186 with a high of 201 and low of 159. It has a hull speed of 5.96 kn (11.04 km/h).
