= O'Day 39 =

Sailboat class

Development
- Designer: Philippe Briand
- Location: United States
- Year: 1982
- No. built: 120
- Builder: O'Day Corp.
- Role: Cruiser
- Name: O'Day 39

Boat
- Displacement: 18,000 lb (8,165 kg)
- Draft: 6.33 ft (1.93 m)

Hull
- Type: monohull
- Construction: fiberglass
- LOA: 38.58 ft (11.76 m)
- LWL: 33.50 ft (10.21 m)
- Beam: 12.58 ft (3.83 m)
- Engine: Universal 44 hp (33 kW) diesel engine

Hull appendages
- Keel: fin keel
- Ballast: 6,600 lb (2,994 kg)
- Rudder: spade-type rudder

Rig
- Rig type: Bermuda rig
- I foretriangle height: 50.02 ft (15.25 m)
- J foretriangle base: 14.10 ft (4.30 m)
- P mainsail luff: 44.28 ft (13.50 m)
- E mainsail foot: 14.17 ft (4.32 m)

Sails
- Sailplan: masthead sloop
- Mainsail area: 313.72 sq ft (29.146 m^{2})
- Jib/genoa area: 352.64 sq ft (32.761 m^{2})
- Total sail area: 666.36 sq ft (61.907 m^{2})

The O'Day 39 is an American sailboat that was designed by Philippe Briand as a cruiser and first built in 1982.

The boat is a development of the Sun Fizz 40, which was licensed for production in the US by Jeanneau. Both Jeanneau and the O'Day Corp. were owned by US conglomerate Bangor Punta at the time.

The O'Day 39 design was developed into the O'Day 40 by C. Raymond Hunt Associates in 1986.

== Production ==
The design was built by O'Day Corp., a division of the Bangor Punta Corp., in the United States. It was built from 1982 until 1985, with 120 boats completed.

== Design ==
The O'Day 39 is a recreational keelboat, built predominantly of fiberglass, with wood trim. It has a masthead sloop rig, a raked stem, a reverse transom, an internally mounted spade-type rudder controlled by a wheel and a fixed fin keel or optional shoal draft keel. The fin keel version displaces 18,000 lb (8,165 kg) and carries 6,600 lb (2,994 kg) of ballast, while the shoal draft version displaces 18,700 lb (8,482 kg).

The boat has a draft of 6.33 ft (1.93 m) with the standard keel and 4.90 ft (1.49 m) with the optional shoal draft keel.

The boat is fitted with a Universal 44 hp (33 kW) diesel engine for docking and maneuvering. The fuel tank holds 40 U.S. gallons (150 L; 33 imp gal) and the fresh water tank has a capacity of 110 U.S. gallons (420 L; 92 imp gal).

The boat has sleeping accommodation for up to nine people, with a double "V"-berth in the bow cabin, a large U-shaped settee around a drop-down table and a straight settee in the main cabin and two aft cabins with a double berths. The galley is located on the port side just forward of the companionway ladder. The galley has a "U"-shape and is equipped with a two-burner stove, an ice box and a double sink. A navigation station is opposite the galley, on the starboard side. There are two heads, one just aft of the bow cabin on the port side and one in the aft cabin, to starboard.

The design has a hull speed of 7.76 kn (14.37 km/h).

== Operational history ==
A 1982 review in Cruising World noted, "the hull design and deck layout are unmistakenly European, with a low, sleek trunk cabin rising from the foredeck; wide, uncluttered, cambered decks for easy mobility when the boat is heeled; and a tall, double spreader masthead sloop rig."

== See also ==
- List of sailing boat types

Related development

- Sun Fizz 40
