= Ranger 16 =

American sailboat

Development
- Designer: Gary Mull
- Location: United States
- Year: 1987
- Builder: Ranger Yachts
- Name: Ranger 16

Boat
- Crew: two
- Displacement: 450 lb (204 kg)
- Draft: 2.95 ft (0.90 m) centerboard down, 0.43 ft (0.13 m) centerboard up

Hull
- Type: Monohull
- Construction: Fiberglass
- LOA: 16.67 ft (5.08 m)
- Beam: 6.00 ft (1.83 m)

Hull appendages
- Keel: retractable centerboard
- Rudder: transom-mounted rudder

Rig
- General: Fractional rigged sloop

Sails
- Total sail area: 154 sq ft (14.3 m^{2})

The Ranger 16 is an American sailboat, that was designed by Gary Mull and first built in 1987.

== Production ==
The boat was built by Ranger Yachts in the United States, starting in 1987, but is now out of production.

== Design ==
The Ranger 16 is a small recreational dinghy, built predominantly of fiberglass. It has a fractional sloop rig, a transom-hung rudder and a retractable centerboard keel. It displaces 450 lb (204 kg).

The boat has a draft of 2.95 ft (0.90 m) with the centerboard down and 0.43 ft (0.13 m) with it up.

== See also ==
- List of sailing boat types
