= Ranger 37 =

Sailboat class

Development
- Designer: Gary Mull
- Location: United States
- Year: 1972
- No. built: 100
- Builder: Ranger Yachts
- Name: Ranger 37

Boat
- Displacement: 15,200 lb (6,895 kg)
- Draft: 6.00 ft (1.83 m)

Hull
- Type: Monohull
- Construction: Fiberglass
- LOA: 37.00 ft (11.28 m)
- LWL: 28.33 ft (8.63 m)
- Beam: 11.33 ft (3.45 m)

Hull appendages
- Keel: fin keel
- Ballast: 7,300 lb (3,311 kg)
- Rudder: internally-mounted rudder with a skeg

Rig
- General: Masthead sloop
- I foretriangle height: 48.42 ft (14.76 m)
- J foretriangle base: 15.65 ft (4.77 m)
- P mainsail luff: 42.83 ft (13.05 m)
- E mainsail foot: 11.67 ft (3.56 m)

Sails
- Mainsail area: 249.91 sq ft (23.217 m^{2})
- Jib/genoa area: 378.89 sq ft (35.200 m^{2})
- Total sail area: 628.80 sq ft (58.417 m^{2})

Racing
- PHRF: 120 (average)

The Ranger 37, also called the Ranger 1 Ton, is an American sailboat, designed by Gary Mull as an International Offshore Rule one-ton racer and first built in 1972.

== Production ==
The boat was built by Ranger Yachts in the United States and 100 examples were completed, starting in 1972. It is now out of production.

== Design ==
The Ranger 37 is a small recreational keelboat, built predominantly of fiberglass. It has a masthead sloop rig, an internally-mounted rudder mounted on a skeg and a fixed fin keel. It displaces 15,200 lb (6,895 kg) and carries 7,300 lb (3,311 kg) of ballast.

The boat has a draft of 6.0 ft (1.8 m) with the standard keel.

The standard rig boat has a PHRF racing average handicap of 120 with a high of 120 and low of 120. It has a hull speed of 7.13 kn (13.20 km/h). There was the option of a taller rig that results in a PHRF racing average handicap of 123 with a high of 129 and low of 120.

== See also ==
- List of sailing boat types
