= Fun 23 =

Sailboat class

Development
- Designer: Joubert-Nivelt
- Location: France
- Year: 1982
- Builders: Jeanneau, Ranger Yachts & Cantiere Nautico Lillia
- Name: Fun 23

Boat
- Displacement: 1,875 lb (850 kg)
- Draft: 5.33 ft (1.62 m) centreboard down, 2.33 ft (0.71 m) centreboard up

Hull
- Type: Monohull
- Construction: Fiberglass
- LOA: 23.33 ft (7.11 m)
- LWL: 17.92 ft (5.46 m)
- Beam: 8.00 ft (2.44 m)

Hull appendages
- Keel: fin keel
- Ballast: 760 lb (345 kg)
- Rudder: internally-mounted spade-type rudder

Rig
- General: Fractional rigged sloop
- I foretriangle height: 22.20 ft (6.77 m)
- J foretriangle base: 8.70 ft (2.65 m)
- P mainsail luff: 27.90 ft (8.50 m)
- E mainsail foot: 10.50 ft (3.20 m)

Sails
- Mainsail area: 146.48 sq ft (13.608 m^{2})
- Jib/genoa area: 96.57 sq ft (8.972 m^{2})
- Total sail area: 243.05 sq ft (22.580 m^{2})

Racing
- PHRF: 180 (average)

The Fun 23 is a French trailerable sailboat, that was designed by Joubert-Nivelt for one design racing and first built in 1982. The design is out of production.

== Production ==
The boat was built by Jeanneau in France, Ranger Yachts in the United States and Cantiere Nautico Lillia in Italy. Jeanneau built a small number of the design, while Ranger completed about 100 examples.

== Design ==
The Fun 23 was conceived by French sailor Alain Forgeot and became an active one-design class in Europe. The design shares a sailplan with the Soling design.

The Fun 23 is a small recreational keelboat, built predominantly of fiberglass. It has a fractional sloop rig, an internally-mounted spade-type rudder and a swing-up fin keel. It displaces 1,875 lb (850 kg) and carries 760 lb (345 kg) of iron ballast.

The design has a draft of 5.33 ft (1.62 m) with the keel down and 2.33 ft (0.71 m) with the keel up.

The boat is normally fitted with a small 2 to 4 hp (1 to 3 kW) outboard motor for docking and maneuvering.

The design has sleeping accommodation for four people, with a double "V"-berth in the bow cabin and two straight settee berths in the main cabin. Cabin headroom is 46 in (117 cm).

The boat has a PHRF racing average handicap of 180 with a high of 192 and low of 174. It has a hull speed of 5.67 kn (10.50 km/h).

== Operational history ==
In a 2010 review Steve Henkel wrote, "Ranger Yachts built about 100 Fun 23's ... The French team of Joubert & Nivelt designed her ... Jeanneau in France also built a few, and an Italian firm, Lillia, also has been a builder. Although the Fun is said to have the same sailplan as a Soling (a 27-foot one-design racing sailboat), actually the mainsails have same dimensions but the foretriangle on the Fun is much smaller than the Soling’s. There are two rigs, a short rig and a 'regular' rig ... the regular rig has a taller but still less-than-masthead jib ... she is strictly a bare-bones overnighter when it comes to accommodations."

== See also ==
- List of sailing boat types
