= Ranger 23 =

Sailboat class

Development
- Designer: Gary Mull
- Location: United States
- Year: 1971
- No. built: 825
- Builder: Ranger Yachts
- Name: Ranger 23

Boat
- Displacement: 3,400 lb (1,542 kg)
- Draft: 3.75 ft (1.14 m)

Hull
- Type: Monohull
- Construction: Fiberglass
- LOA: 23.67 ft (7.21 m)
- LWL: 20.00 ft (6.10 m)
- Beam: 7.92 ft (2.41 m)

Hull appendages
- Keel: fin keel
- Ballast: 1,500 lb (680 kg)
- Rudder: internally-mounted spade-type rudder

Rig
- General: Fractional rigged sloop Masthead sloop
- I foretriangle height: 27.54 ft (8.39 m)
- J foretriangle base: 9.75 ft (2.97 m)
- P mainsail luff: 24 ft (7.3 m)
- E mainsail foot: 9.17 ft (2.80 m)

Sails
- Mainsail area: 110.04 sq ft (10.223 m^{2})
- Jib/genoa area: 134.26 sq ft (12.473 m^{2})
- Total sail area: 244.30 sq ft (22.696 m^{2})

Racing
- PHRF: 231 (average, TM model)

The Ranger 23 is an American trailerable sailboat, that was designed by Gary Mull as an International Offshore Rule quarter-ton racer.

== Production ==
The Ranger 23 was built by Ranger Yachts in the United States, starting in 1971. Manufacturing ended in 1978 and the design remains out of production.

A taller mast version was introduced in 1974 and remained available until 1978.

== Design ==
The Ranger 23 is a small recreational keelboat, built predominantly of fiberglass. It has a masthead sloop rig, with a 4:1 mainsheet, 2:1 outhaul, an internally-mounted spade-type rudder and a fixed fin keel. There are two jibsheet winches in the cockpit and a halyard winch located on the mast. The topping lift is internally mounted on the boom. The boat displaces 3,400 lb (1,542 kg) and carries 1,500 lb (680 kg) of ballast.

The boat has a draft of 3.75 ft (1.14 m) with the standard fin keel and a hull speed of 5.99 kn (11.09 km/h).

The boat is normally fitted with a small 3 to 6 hp (2 to 4 kW) outboard motor for docking and maneuvering.

The accommodations include berths for four people, with a double "V"-berth in the bow cabin and two straight settee berths in the main cabin. The galley is located on both sides just aft of the bow cabin. The galley is equipped with a two-burner stove to port and a sink and an icebox to starboard. It has a 12 U.S. gallons (45 L; 10.0 imp gal) capacity fresh water tank. The head is located in the bow cabin under the "V"-berth. Cabin headroom is 51 in (130 cm).

== Variants ==
Ranger 23
Standard model, produced from 1971-1978.
Ranger 23 TM
Tall mast version, produced from 1974-1978, with a mast about 2.5 ft (0.76 m) higher. It has a PHRF racing average handicap of 231 with a high of 246 and low of 216.

== Operational history ==
In a 2010 review Steve Henkel wrote, "the Ranger 23 was one in a long series of designs Gary Mull produced for Ranger Yachts, then a division of Jensen Marine, builder of the Cal line of sailboats. In an interview we did with Mull in 1986, he maintained that each of his designs 'has to be good looking, and has to sail well. It has to have good balance, and it has to have an airy, bright, pleasant interior so you don't feel like you are going to jail when you go down below. It's got to have a comfortable cockpit where you can work the boat without bashing your elbows or tipping over or whatever. It's a boat that, if you want to cruise it for a while, you can do it by simply loading aboard the stores and some clothes, and just do it. If you want to race it, you can do that by off-loading some of the stores and gear and going racing. And, of course, it's not going to be a successful IOR boat, because it's not an IOR boat, but it's probably going to be a better cruising boat than 99 percent of the cruising boats on the market, which are caricatures of cruising boats.' The Ranger 23 appears to fit that description, Best and worst features: We think designer Mull summed it all up adequately. Case closed."

== See also ==
- List of sailing boat types
