= Elmer H. Wavering =

- Born: April 22, 1907; Quincy, Illinois, U.S.
- Died: November 20, 1998 (aged 91); Naples, Florida, U.S.
- Occupations: Automotive engineer; Inventor; President of Motorola
- Spouse: Vera Deremiah (m. 1935; died 1988)
- Children: 1

Elmer H. Wavering (April 22, 1907 – November 20, 1998) was an American automotive engineer as well as a founder and president of Motorola. He is known as the father of modern automotive electronics.

== Early life ==
Elmer H. Wavering was born in Quincy, Illinois, on April 22, 1907. At the age of 14, he had already created his first radio. In high school, he worked at Quincy Radio Laboratory, a radio parts store, run by Bill Lear.

He attended George Washington University, but did not graduate. In 1928, he returned to Quincy to open Waverite Radio Shop.

== Career ==
=== Motorola ===
Inspired by a conversation with their girlfriends on an evening drive, Wavering and Lear worked on a car radio prototype. They met Paul Galvin at a radio convention in Chicago and in 1930, Wavering and Lear joined Galvin at Galvin Manufacturing (later Motorola). There, Wavering and Lear together developed the first commercially successful car radio calling it the Motorola. Wavering and Galvin traveled around the country selling radios and teaching new dealers how to install them. In 1932, Paul Galvin selected Wavering to lead Motorola's car radio and police two-way communications businesses. He was later promoted to vice president of the automotive products division. In the 1940s, he also worked on developing the intermittent windshield wiper. In 1944, he became the vice president of auto products.

He invented the first automotive alternator and mass-produced it at Motorola. In the 1950s, Wavering presented a concept car that included an alternator, a 12-volt battery, electronic ignition, and computerized control. In 1964, he was elected president and chief operating officer of Motorola. He later became vice chairman. He remained at Motorola until he retired in 1972.

=== World War II ===
During World War II, Wavering led a national effort to produce artificial quartz out of silica sand for use in radio and radar. He also co-invented the Handie Talkie (later the Walkie-Talkie), a mobile two-way radio communication device.

=== Later career ===
Wavering worked with Lear in the development of the 8-track tape cartridge player. He worked to help the first industry standards for videocassettes and discs.

Wavering led the effort to produce radios for NASA's Lunar rover in the Apollo missions.

== Personal life ==
Wavering met Vera Deremiah, a teacher from St. Louis, Missouri, on a sales trip and they married on June 25, 1935. His wife died in 1988. Together, they had one daughter, Lynne, in 1942.

== Death ==
Wavering died on November 20, 1998, in Naples, Florida, at the age of 91.

== Awards and legacy ==
- War Production "E" Award, for his role in leading efforts to produce artificial quartz during World War II.
- 1970 – a park in Quincy, Illinois was dedicated in his honor.
- 1977 - received honorary degree in technology and communications from the Quincy University
- 1984 - received honorary degree from the Wartburg College in Waverly, Iowa
- 1989 – inducted into the Automotive Hall of Fame
- 1991 - received the State of Illinois's Order of Lincoln from The Lincoln Academy of Illinois by Governor Jim Edgar

Wavering Park in Phelps, WI, was built in his honor.
