= Envirotech (company) =

California-based manufacturing company

- Company type: Public
- Industry: Manufacturing
- Founded: 1968 or 1969 in Palo Alto, California
- Founder: Robert L. Chambers
- Headquarters: Menlo Park, California United States
- Key people: R.L. Chambers (CEO); B.A. Schepman (COO)
- Revenue: US$75,000,000 (1970); US$145,800,000 (1972); US$250,000,000 (1975)
- Net income: US$4,400,000 (1972)
- Owners: Estel (25%, 1975)
- Footnotes / references 1970 revenue; 1972 revenue and income; 1975 revenues

Envirotech was an American company based in Menlo Park, California and founded in 1968 or 1969 by Robert L. Chambers in Palo Alto, California. (Note: Woody-1977 places the founding year as 1968. However, Staff-1970 places the foundation date in May 1969.) It was described by one journalist in 1977 as "the world's leader in manufacture and sale of equipment for processing water for municipal systems and liquids in industrial processes."

== Organization and operations ==
The company was composed of a number of operational divisions. The Eimco division, based in Salt Lake City, Utah and the largest of the company's divisions, focused on the manufacture of water and liquid waste processing equipment, but also produced underground loaders for tunneling and mining operations.

The company also had a manufacturing and engineering presence in Europe focused on water treatment, with facilities in England, France, Germany and Italy, which it sold a >80% stake in to Estel in 1975 in order to raise capital for expansion in other areas; products and services acquired by Estel were subsequently provided to customers through its EMSIL subsidiary.

In 1971, the company consolidated the majority of its research and development operations to a site in downtown Salt Lake City, Utah.

In regard to geographic structure, the Envirotech International unit was formed in 1975 as an umbrella for the company's non-United States operations, with Paul R. Gibson named as the first head of the unit. Other foreign units included Envirotech Asia-Pacific, which Gibson presided over starting in 1972, and Envirotech Australia, of which Gibson was the managing director in 1970.

=== Buell ===
In 1974, Buell or Buell-Envirotech was noted as being the company's "air quality division", based in Lebanon County, Pennsylvania. A noted product of the unit is an electrostatic precipitator used in energy generation facilities. Three years later, in 1977, The Buell Emission Control Division was noted as being involved in the R&D and manufacture of bag-based industrial smokestack emissions control solutions. This division pre-dates formation of Envirotech, having been established in Lebanon County in 1963 following acquisition of the Union Boiler Shop. The division began with 135 employees and expanded to 570 in 1974.

Prior to this, in 1972, Buell had been noted as being one of three units (the others being Norblo and Arco) which were bound together into a new Air Pollution Control Group, the first president of which was Robert E. Stanaway.

== History ==
The driver behind formation of Envirotech was "to create in one corporation a total systems capability to handle major environmental pollution problems."

Envirotech was founded as a private concern by "a syndicate of private investors". The "syndicate" consisted of founder Chambers, the investment firm Donaldson, Lufkin & Jenrette, and the conglomerate North American Rockwell (an ancestor of Rockwell International). Rockwell's major contribution was in the form of knowledge and intellectual property in the areas of pollution control and waste water treatment. The first form of the company was as a set of manufacturing units pulled from other companies: Ogden, Bangor Punta and Arthur G. McKee.

The company went public in September 1971 and was traded over-the-counter until August 1972, when it was listed on the New York Stock Exchange.

Envirotech diversified into air pollution control in mid-1971 when it acquired three companies: Buell Engineering (of Lebanon, Pennsylvania), Norblo and AMBUCO (of England). Both Buell and AMBUCO were acquired from Consolidated Gold Fields. In early 1972 this was followed by a fourth acquisition, the air pollution unit of Arco Industries Corporation. (Note: It is unclear whether Arco Industries Corporation is related to ARCO or not.)

In 1975, the company agreed to have Estel, a major European steel manufacturing concern, acquire up to 25% of the company's outstanding stock as an investment move to raise capital to support needed expansion of manufacturing operations aimed at addressing a growing backlog of unmet orders.

== Personnel ==
At the time of the company's consolidation of R&D facilities in Salt Lake City in 1971, Donald Dahlstrom was the company's head of research and development. Also at this time, Jerry Schell held the subordinate post of R&D director for sanitary engineering.

=== Corporate governance ===
As of 1977, founder Chambers was the chairman and chief executive officer (CEO) of the company, and Berne A. Schepman was the company's chief operating officer (COO). Earlier, in 1971, Schepman was reported to have held the position of president.
