= Rhodes Ranger 29 =

1960s recreational keelboat

Development
- Designer: Philip Rhodes
- Location: United States
- Year: 1960
- Builder: de Visser Shipyard
- Role: Cruiser
- Name: Rhodes Ranger 29

Boat
- Displacement: 7,965 lb (3,613 kg)
- Draft: 3.82 ft (1.16 m)

Hull
- Type: monohull
- Construction: fiberglass
- LOA: 28.50 ft (8.69 m)
- LWL: 20.00 ft (6.10 m)
- Beam: 8.00 ft (2.44 m)
- Engine: inboard engine or outboard motor

Hull appendages
- Keel: modified long keel
- Ballast: 2,750 lb (1,247 kg)
- Rudder: keel-mounted rudder

Rig
- Rig type: Bermuda rig
- I foretriangle height: 30.50 ft (9.30 m)
- J foretriangle base: 10.80 ft (3.29 m)
- P mainsail luff: 27.30 ft (8.32 m)
- E mainsail foot: 12.00 ft (3.66 m)

Sails
- Sailplan: masthead sloop
- Mainsail area: 163.80 sq ft (15.218 m^{2})
- Jib/genoa area: 164.70 sq ft (15.301 m^{2})
- Total sail area: 328.50 sq ft (30.519 m^{2})

The Rhodes Ranger 29 is a recreational keelboat designed by Philip Rhodes as a cruiser and first built in 1960. The boat is Rhodes' design #437.

The Rhodes Ranger 29 can be confused with the 1971 Gary Mull-designed Ranger 29.

A version built in the United Kingdom was marketed as the Santander 28.

== Production ==
The design was built by de Visser Shipyard in the Netherlands, starting in 1960, but it is now out of production. Seafarer Yachts imported the design into the United States.

== Design ==
The Rhodes Ranger 29 is built predominantly of fiberglass, with wood trim. It has a masthead sloop rig; a spooned, raked stem; a raised counter, angled transom; a keel-mounted rudder controlled by a tiller and a fixed modified long keel, with a cutaway forefoot. It displaces 7,965 lb (3,613 kg) and carries 1,900 lb (862 kg) of iron ballast, or, optionally, 2,750 lb (1,247 kg) of lead ballast.

The boat has a draft of 3.82 ft (1.16 m) with the standard keel.

The boat is normally fitted with a small outboard motor mounted in the lazarette well, or, optionally, an inboard motor mounted over the keel, for docking and maneuvering.

The design has sleeping accommodation for four people, with a double "V"-berth in the bow cabin and two straight settee berths in the main cabin. The galley is located on both sides of the companionway ladder. The galley is equipped with a stove to port and a sink to starboard. The enclosed head is located just aft of the bow cabin on the port side, opposite a hanging locker.

The design has a hull speed of 5.99 kn (11.09 km/h).
