= Ranger 26 =

Sailboat class

Development
- Designer: Gary Mull
- Location: United States
- Year: 1969; 57 years ago
- Builder: Ranger Yachts
- Name: Ranger 26

Boat
- Displacement: 5,860 lb (2,658 kg)
- Draft: 4.33 ft (1.32 m)

Hull
- Type: Monohull
- Construction: Fiberglass
- LOA: 26.25 ft (8.00 m)
- LWL: 21.75 ft (6.63 m)
- Beam: 8.67 ft (2.64 m)

Hull appendages
- Keel: fin keel
- Ballast: 2,050 lb (930 kg)
- Rudder: internally-mounted spade-type rudder

Rig
- General: Masthead sloop
- I foretriangle height: 33.00 ft (10.06 m)
- J foretriangle base: 11.50 ft (3.51 m)
- P mainsail luff: 26.40 ft (8.05 m)
- E mainsail foot: 10.00 ft (3.05 m)

Sails
- Mainsail area: 132.00 sq ft (12.263 m^{2})
- Jib/genoa area: 189.75 sq ft (17.628 m^{2})
- Total sail area: 321.75 sq ft (29.892 m^{2})

The Ranger 26 is an American sailboat, that was designed by Gary Mull.

The Ranger 26 is not related to the 1980 Mull designed Ranger 26-2, nor is it related to the Raymond Richards designed Ranger Boat Company 26 of 1978 or the Germán Frers designed 1983 Frers 26, which was marketed as the Ranger 26 by the Brazilian company Mariner Construções Náuticas Ltd for a time.

== Production ==
The boat was built by Ranger Yachts in the United States with production from 1969 to 1975. The design is now out of production.

== Design ==
The Ranger 26 is a small recreational keelboat, built predominantly of fiberglass. It has a masthead sloop rig, an internally-mounted spade-type rudder and a fixed fin keel. It displaces 5,860 lb (2,658 kg) and carries 2,050 lb (930 kg) of iron ballast. The boat has a draft of 4.33 ft (1.32 m) with the standard fin keel.

The boat has a hull speed of 6.25 kn (11.58 km/h).

== See also ==
- List of sailing boat types
