= Ranger 30 =

Sailboat class

Development
- Designer: C. Raymond Hunt Associates
- Location: United States
- Year: 1977
- Builder: Ranger Yachts
- Name: Ranger 30

Boat
- Displacement: 10,500 lb (4,763 kg)
- Draft: 5.50 ft (1.68 m)

Hull
- Type: Monohull
- Construction: Fiberglass
- LOA: 30.00 ft (9.14 m)
- LWL: 25.42 ft (7.75 m)
- Beam: 10.75 ft (3.28 m)
- Engine: Universal Atomic 4 gasoline engine

Hull appendages
- Keel: fin keel
- Ballast: 4,300 lb (1,950 kg)
- Rudder: internally-mounted spade-type rudder

Rig
- General: Fractional rigged sloop Masthead sloop
- I foretriangle height: 41.50 ft (12.65 m)
- J foretriangle base: 13.50 ft (4.11 m)
- P mainsail luff: 35.50 ft (10.82 m)
- E mainsail foot: 10.25 ft (3.12 m)

Sails
- Mainsail area: 181.94 sq ft (16.903 m^{2})
- Jib/genoa area: 280.13 sq ft (26.025 m^{2})
- Total sail area: 462.06 sq ft (42.927 m^{2})

Racing
- PHRF: 174 (average)

The Ranger 30 is an American sailboat, that was designed by C. Raymond Hunt Associates and first built in 1977.

== Production ==
The boat was built by Ranger Yachts in the United States, starting in 1977, but is now out of production.

== Design ==
The Ranger 30 is a recreational keelboat, built predominantly of fiberglass, with wood trim. It has a masthead sloop rig, an internally-mounted spade-type rudder and a fixed fin keel. It displaces 10,500 lb (4,763 kg) and carries 4,300 lb (1,950 kg) of ballast. The boat has a draft of 5.50 ft (1.68 m) with the standard keel.

The boat is fitted with a Universal Atomic 4 gasoline engine.

The boat has a PHRF racing average handicap of 174 with a high of 185 and low of 168. It has a hull speed of 6.76 kn (12.52 km/h).

== See also ==
- List of sailing boat types
