= Ranger Yachts =

American sailboat manufacturer

- Company type: Privately held company, later a conglomerate division
- Industry: Boat building
- Founded: 1970
- Founder: Jack Jensen
- Defunct: 1987
- Headquarters: United States
- Products: Sailboats

Ranger Yachts was an American boat builder founded by Jack Jensen. The company specialized in the design and manufacture of sailboats for the North American market.

== History ==
The company was formed by Jensen in 1970 to complement his existing west coast Cal Boats business. Jensen had already started Jensen Marine and had an exclusive boat design contract with William Lapworth. Jensen started Ranger Yachts both to serve the east coast American market and also to allow him to contract Gary Mull to design the Ranger boats.

Ranger boats were originally built in Costa Mesa, California, but the operation was moved to Tampa, Florida in 1981 to better serve the market.

The company was acquired by American conglomerate Bangor Punta in 1973 and became part of Lear Siegler when it bought out Bangor Punta in 1984.

As part of Lear Siegler's restructuring in the late 1980s the Ranger line was discontinued, the design contract with Mull terminated and the division was dissolved in 1987. Lear Siegler later ordered most of the Ranger boat molds destroyed.

== Designs ==
The company's designs were all drawn by Mull, with the exception of the Fun 23, designed by Joubert-Nivelt of France and the Ranger 30, which was designed by C. Raymond Hunt Associates.

== Boats ==
Summary of boats built by Ranger Yachts:

- Fun 23
- Ranger 16
- Ranger 22
- Ranger 23
- Ranger 26
- Ranger 26-2
- Ranger 28
- Ranger 29
- Ranger 30
- Ranger 32
- Ranger 33
- Ranger 37

== See also ==
- Cal Yachts (aka Cal Boats aka Jensen Marine)
