= Ranger 28 =

Sailboat class

Development
- Designer: Gary Mull
- Location: United States
- Year: 1976
- No. built: 130
- Builder: Ranger Yachts (a division of Bangor Punta)
- Name: Ranger 28

Boat
- Displacement: 5,081 lb (2,305 kg)
- Draft: 4.50 ft (1.37 m)

Hull
- Type: Monohull
- Construction: Fiberglass
- LOA: 28.00 ft (8.53 m)
- LWL: 21.67 ft (6.61 m)
- Beam: 9.58 ft (2.92 m)
- Engine: Universal Atomic 4 30 hp (22 kW) gasoline engine

Hull appendages
- Keel: fin keel
- Ballast: 2,792 lb (1,266 kg)
- Rudder: internally-mounted spade-type rudder with skeg

Rig
- General: Masthead sloop
- I foretriangle height: 36.00 ft (10.97 m)
- J foretriangle base: 12.00 ft (3.66 m)
- P mainsail luff: 31.50 ft (9.60 m)
- E mainsail foot: 11.00 ft (3.35 m)

Sails
- Mainsail area: 173.25 sq ft (16.095 m^{2})
- Jib/genoa area: 216.00 sq ft (20.067 m^{2})
- Total sail area: 389.25 sq ft (36.163 m^{2})

Racing
- PHRF: 180 (average)

The Ranger 28 is an American sailboat, that was designed by Gary Mull as an International Offshore Rule Half Ton class racer and first built in 1976.

== Production ==
The boat was built by Ranger Yachts in the United States. Ranger yachts was a division of Bangor Punta at the time. A total of 130 examples were completed before production ended in 1978.

== Design ==
The Ranger 28 is a small recreational keelboat, built predominantly of fiberglass, with wood trim. It has a masthead sloop rig, an internally-mounted spade-type rudder on a skeg and a fixed fin keel. It displaces 5,081 lb (2,305 kg) and carries 2,792 lb (1,266 kg) of lead ballast. The boat has a draft of 4.50 ft (1.37 m) with the standard fin keel.

The boat is fitted with a Universal Atomic 4 gasoline engine of 30 hp (22 kW).

The Ranger 28 has a hull speed of 6.24 kn (11.56 km/h).

== Variants ==
Ranger 28
Standard model, with a PHRF racing average handicap of 180 with a high of 177 and low of 183.
Ranger 28 TM Serial numbers 1-86
Early tall mast model, with a PHRF racing average handicap of 183 with a high of 196 and low of 174.
Ranger 28 TM Serial numbers 87 and later
Later tall mast model with a deeper keel, with a PHRF racing average handicap of 180 with a high of 180 and low of 186.

== See also ==
- List of sailing boat types
