= Siegler Corporation =

Former technology company

The Siegler Corporation was incorporated in December 1950 as Siegler Heating Company. Originally a maker of climate control equipment, the company changed its name to Siegler Corporation after merging with Siegler Enamel Range Company Inc. in 1954. In that year, John G. Brooks, a flamboyant entrepreneur, and nine other associates bought the Siegler Corporation of Centralia, Illinois, for $3.3 million; $3.2 million of this was borrowed for 24 hours at a cost of $60,000. Over the next decade and a half, Brooks, who became Siegler’s first president, established a reputation for supervising numerous startling acquisitions.

In June 1955, seven months after the merger, Hallamore Manufacturing Company, an electronics firm, became Siegler's first "technology" acquisition. During the 1960s, the company expanded rapidly. John G. Brooks (Echo Products, Zenith Radio, and US Army Air Corps) headed up the new enterprise.

== History ==
The management team transformed the low-tech space heater company into a viable corporate platform for acquiring multiple successful small companies. This strategy of "buying growth" coupled with sound management proved successful. At the end of its first year the corporation listed on the New York Stock Exchange.

The Siegler Corporation quickly distinguished itself as one of the first conglomerates. These were a new breed of business entities that were characterized by a variety of diverse business interests or operating divisions held or controlled by a central management. This management component was typically the only thing these divisions had in common. Examples of conglomerates are LTV (Ling-Temco-Vought) and TRW (Thompson Ramo Wooldridge).

Siegler continued its program of non-hostile acquisitions of target companies. In 1956-1957 when it added Hallamore Electronics of Anaheim, California, and the corporate offices followed to Southern California. Notable efforts of the new Los Angeles based enterprise include:

- The first attempt to introduce cable television (1960-1961) in the form of a product offered by STV (Subscription Television) was strongly opposed by theater owners and existing television networks and their lobbying effort resulted in a legislative measure to prohibit such service.
- Pioneering efforts in heating, ventilating and air conditioning by the Holly division ultimately resulted in the development of heat exchanger technology for commercial and residential climate control.

Lear Siegler was created as a result of a merger between the Siegler Corporation (Los Angeles) and Lear Avionics Inc. (Santa Monica) that was concluded in 1961, though leadership was substantially from the Siegler side of the merger. Initially, Brooks was Chairman of the Board of the new corporation and Albert G. Handshumaker (from Lear) was the president, although Brooks resumed the duties and both titles within the next several years and held both until his death in 1971. By 1970 LSI had 56 divisions in 17 countries operating in six major business areas—commercial products, fabricated products, avionics, power equipment, systems and services, and real estate. After further mergers, LSI products and services are now offered by URS Corporation.

== See also ==
- Lear Siegler
