= Lear Siegler =

American manufacturing company

- Type: Private
- Industry: Aerospace-technology, automotive parts, and industrial-commercial
- Founded: 1962

Lear Siegler Incorporated (LSI) was a diverse American corporation established in 1962. Its products range from car seats and brakes to weapons control systems for military fighter planes. The company's more than $2 billion-a-year annual sales comes from three major areas: aerospace-technology, automotive parts, and industrial-commercial. The company, however, is basically anonymous, since its products are either unmarked or bear only the label "LSI". Lear Siegler went private in 1987.

LSI is sometimes confused with Learjet, which manufactures executive jets.

== History ==
=== Siegler ===
The Siegler Corporation was incorporated in December 1950 as the Siegler Heating Company. Originally a maker of climate control equipment, the company changed its name to Siegler Corporation after merging with Siegler Enamel Range Company Inc. in 1954. In that year, John G. Brooks, a flamboyant entrepreneur, and nine other associates bought the Siegler Corporation of Centralia, Illinois, for $3.3 million; $3.2 million of this was borrowed for 24 hours at a cost of $60,000. Over the next decade and a half, Brooks, who became Siegler's first president, established a reputation for supervising numerous startling acquisitions. In June 1955, seven months after the merger, Hallamore Manufacturing Company, an electronics firm, became Siegler's first "technology" acquisition. During the 1960s, the company expanded rapidly. John G. Brooks (Echo Products, Zenith Radio, and US Army Air Corps) headed up the new enterprise.

The management team transformed the low-tech space heater company into a viable corporate platform for acquiring multiple successful small companies. This strategy of "buying growth" coupled with sound management proved successful. At the end of its first year the corporation listed on the New York Stock Exchange. The Siegler Corporation quickly distinguished itself as one of the first conglomerates. These were a new breed of business entities that were characterized by a variety of diverse business interests or operating divisions held or controlled by a central management. This management component was typically the only thing these divisions had in common. Examples of conglomerates are LTV (Ling-Temco-Vought) and TRW (Thompson Ramo Wooldridge).

Siegler continued its program of non-hostile acquisitions of target companies. In 1956–1957 it added Hallamore Electronics of Anaheim, California, and the corporate offices followed to Southern California. Notable efforts of the new Los Angeles based enterprise included:

- The first attempt to introduce cable television (1960–1961) in the form of a product offered by STV (subscription television) was strongly opposed by theater owners and existing television networks, and their lobbying effort resulted in a legislative measure to prohibit such service.
- Pioneering efforts in heating, ventilating and air conditioning by the Holly division ultimately resulted in the development of heat exchanger technology for commercial and residential climate control.

=== Merger into Lear Siegler ===
Lear Siegler Incorporated was created as a result of the 1961 merger between the Siegler Corporation (Los Angeles) and Lear Avionics Inc. (of Santa Monica, also known as Lear Inc.). Lear Inc. was an aerospace electronics firm.

The merger was complete by 1962, and the new company was named Lear Siegler Incorporated. The deal, which cost Siegler five shares for each seven Lear shares, nearly doubled the company's sales – from $96.2 million in 1961 to $190.8 million by the end of 1962.

John G. Brooks was founder, President and Chairman of Siegler; and William Lear was founder, President and chairman at Lear.

The merger was based on Brooks' plan of acquiring and growing successful but possibly unrelated operating companies (with resources and management in common) into one of the first conglomerates (with a focus on aerospace, defense and consumer markets), and Lear's goal of divesting his ownership interest in Lear to pursue development of his Learjet corporate aircraft (the first pure jet private aircraft) as well as other engineering innovations.

The business climate was strongly influenced by the political undercurrent that accelerated when Sputnik was launched, and amplified when President John F. Kennedy set as a national goal putting an American astronaut on the Moon by the end of the 1960s. This goal, based on an unprecedented effort by the combined resources of the American aerospace industry, was achieved in 1969.

In 1965, LSI acquired all assets of Hypro Engineering Inc. (operated as the Hypro Division) in exchange for more than 120,000 common shares. In 1966, it purchased American Metal Products Corporation, an automobile seating and furniture parts manufacturer, and Home Furnace Company (which operated as a division of the company). In 1968, LSI purchased National Broach & Machine, a gear machine manufacturer.

LSI acquired Cuckler Steel Span Company (operated as Cuckler Building Systems Division) in 1970. The purchase of the Haas Corporation inaugurated the company's plastics division, and American Industrial Manufacturing Company, a manufacturer of thermo, plastic, and fiberglass safety helmets, represented LSI's entry into plastics manufacturing.

By 1970, LSI had 56 divisions in 17 countries operating in six major business areas — commercial products, fabricated products, avionics, power equipment, systems and services, and real estate. Keys to the company's growth and performance were product diversification; balanced growth, where internal growth matches growth by acquisition; a favorable sales ratio between non-government and government business; a formalized, in-depth planning program; and emphasis on management development. Sales had skyrocketed from $6.5 million at its inception to over $600 million by the close of 1969. Government / Aerospace accounted for 65% of its volume.

In its expansion, Lear Siegler had acquired Bangor Punta, which was an early conglomerate manufacturing Piper Aircraft, multiple brands of sailboats, including Ranger Yachts, Smith & Wesson firearms, and other well-known brands.

=== 1971–1979 ===
In January 1971, following a business dinner in Detroit, John G. Brooks had a fatal stroke at the age of 58. He had personally presided over more than three dozen acquisitions of mismatched, marginally profitable businesses which took the company into many different areas. Robert Campion, then company Secretary, followed Brooks as Lear Siegler's president and chief executive officer.

In 1971, the company, then a major subcontractor for the Lockheed L-1011 commercial jet programs, saw its earnings plunge when the project was suspended because of problems with the jet's engine supplier, Rolls-Royce. Delays in other government projects, steep start-up costs at a modular housing factory in Hawaii, and a strike at General Motors also damaged the company's profits. By the end of the year, Lear found itself involved in a major reorganization which involved consolidating five of its divisions and selling five others.

CEO Robert Campion's low-key approach permitted the company to avoid media scrutiny. LSI leveraged its new expertise in controls, instruments and navigation systems into a steadily increasing share of government and general aviation contracts for research and development, as well as system delivery.

Notable innovations at that time include inertial guidance systems, "hands off" landing systems, the telemetry and navigational instrumentation for the Apollo Moon missions, and the flight controls for the Lockheed L-1011 commercial aircraft.

==== Computer terminals ====
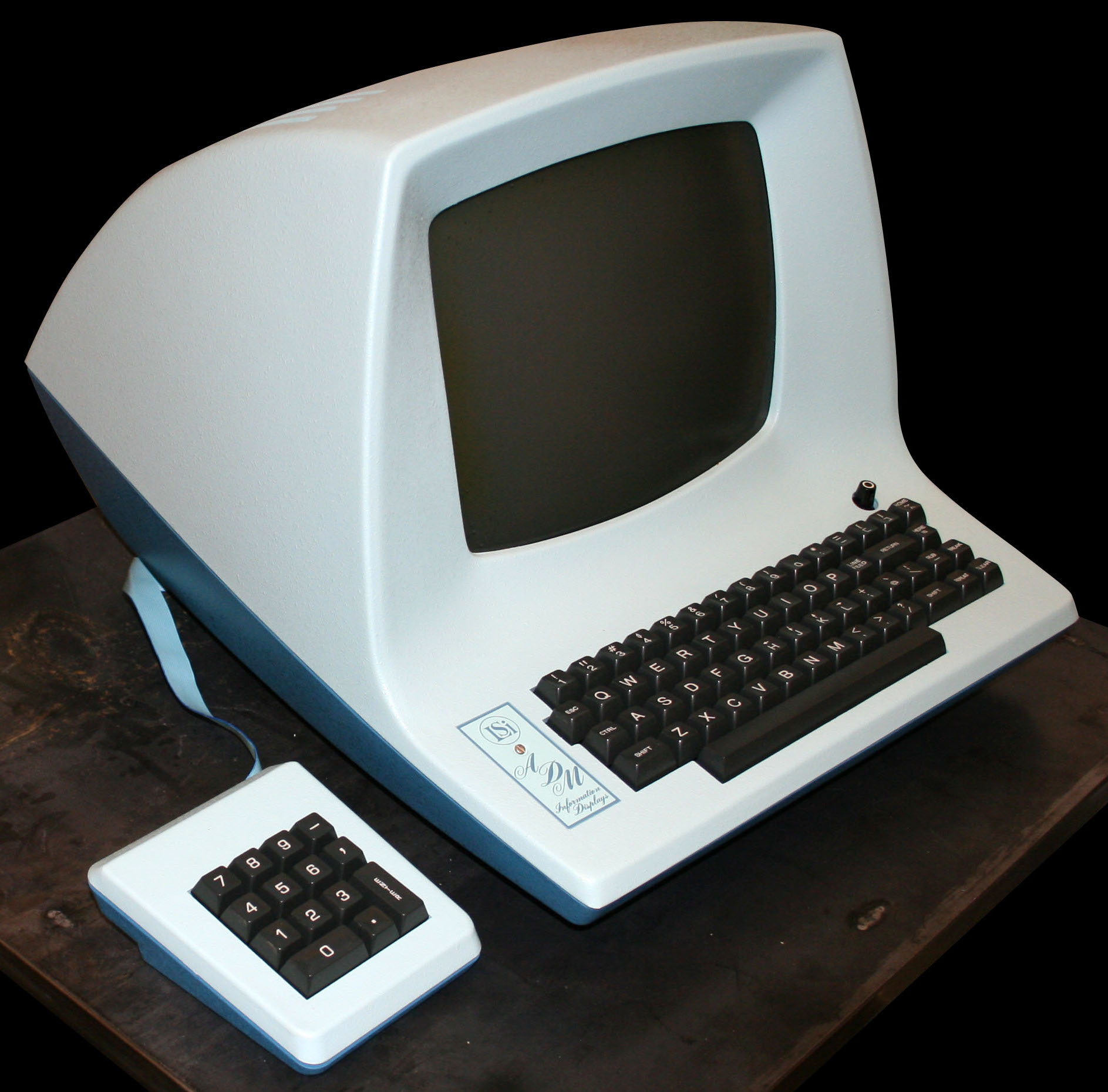
ADM-3A

In 1972, LSI manufactured the first video terminal — the 7700A.

Because the new minicomputer systems required inexpensive operator consoles (compared to teletype printers), the terminals became a success.

In 1973, LSI hired the new head of engineering, Jim Placak. He and his team created the ADM-1 terminal in late 1973. It set a new pricing low in the industry at $1,500. Its lower cost was primarily due to a unique single printed-circuit board design. The ADM-1 was followed by the ADM-2 in early 1974. It had expanded functionality and a detached keyboard.

In 1976, LSI released ADM-3A, one of the earliest computer video terminals, with a new industry low single unit price of $995. With no fast low-cost printers available, the ADM-3 became the de facto standard.

=== 1980s and the modern era ===
In 1982 the Royal New Zealand Airforce initiated Project Kahu to modernise their aging A-4 Skyhawks. This involved the removal of existing analog avionics, the replacement of the aforementioned analog components with those taken from spare F-16 parts as-well as the addition of a modified AN/APG-66 Radar. LSI was selected as a part provider and supervisor of the upgrades.

In late 1986, LSI was put up for sale by the investment banking firm, Drexel Burnham. This led to the purchase of LSI by Forstman Little in early 1987. Subsequently, most of LSI's divisions were sold off leading to such independent companies as Safeflight, Smith and Wesson, Piper, Lear Siegler Seating and BFM Aerospace. The division that produced fly by wire systems and unmanned aircraft was purchased by British Aerospace, now part of BAE, the largest defense contractor in the world.

In 1997, LSS Holdings, LLC acquired the operating assets of Lear Siegler, Inc. and its subsidiaries UNC Lear Siegler Services, Inc. and Burnside OTT Training Center, Inc.

LSI provided aircraft maintenance support services on F-5 aircraft under a contract with a Saudi Arabian government ministry, ending in 2000. Contested rent from Saudi Arabian landowners led to a 2004 judgement by the International Chamber of Commerce (ICC) in favor of the landowners. In addition, per URS Corp's 2004 form 10-K Report, Saudi Arabia issued $5.1 million in taxes for the years 1999 through 2002.

== See also ==
- ADM-3A, an early LSI terminal

== Bibliography ==
- Planning for Growth and Profit: The Success Story of Lear Siegler, Inc, Newcomen Society, 1970, ASIN B000K5P39I.
- Olson, Gordon L (1994), Fifty times around the sun: History of Lear-Siegler, Smiths Defense Systems North America, Public History Services, ASIN B0006QR4UW.
- Boesen, Victor (1971), They Said It Couldn't Be Done:: The Incredible Story of Bill Lear, Doubleday & Co.
- Rashke, Richard L (1985), Stormy Genius: The Life of Aviation's Maverick Bill Lear, Houghton Mifflin, ISBN 0-395-35372-6.
