= Sun Fizz 40 =

Sailboat class

Development
- Designer: Philippe Briand
- Location: France
- Year: 1980
- No. built: 651
- Builder: Jeanneau
- Role: Cruiser

Boat
- Displacement: 16,094 lb (7,300 kg)
- Draft: 6.40 ft (1.95 m)

Hull
- Type: monohull
- Construction: fiberglass
- LOA: 40.35 ft (12.30 m)
- LWL: 33.50 ft (10.21 m)
- Beam: 12.63 ft (3.85 m)
- Engine: Perkins Engines 50 hp (37 kW) diesel engine

Hull appendages
- Keel: fin keel
- Ballast: 6,614 lb (3,000 kg)
- Rudder: spade-type rudder

Rig
- Rig type: Bermuda rig
- I foretriangle height: 50.00 ft (15.24 m)
- J foretriangle base: 13.90 ft (4.24 m)
- P mainsail luff: 45.00 ft (13.72 m)
- E mainsail foot: 14.30 ft (4.36 m)

Sails
- Sailplan: masthead sloop
- Mainsail area: 355 sq ft (33.0 m^{2})
- Jib/genoa area: 183 sq ft (17.0 m^{2})
- Spinnaker area: 1,184 sq ft (110.0 m^{2})
- Other sails: genoa: 533 sq ft (49.5 m^{2}) solent: 318 sq ft (29.5 m^{2}) storm jib: 86 sq ft (8.0 m^{2})
- Upwind sail area: 888 sq ft (82.5 m^{2})
- Downwind sail area: 1,539 sq ft (143.0 m^{2})

The Sun Fizz 40, or just Sun Fizz, is a French sailboat that was designed by Philippe Briand as a cruiser and first built in 1980.

The design was developed into the O'Day 39 in 1982 for United States market.

== Production ==
The design was built by Jeanneau in France, from 1980 to 1986, with 651 boats completed.

== Design ==
The Sun Fizz 40 is a recreational keelboat, built predominantly of polyester fiberglass, with wood trim. It has a masthead sloop rig, with a deck-stepped mast, two sets of unswept spreaders and aluminum spars with stainless steel 1X19 wire rigging. The hull has a raked stem, a reverse transom, an internally mounted spade-type rudder controlled by a wheel and a fixed fin keel or optional stub keel and retractable centerboard. The fin keel version displaces 16,094 lb (7,300 kg) and carries 6,614 lb (3,000 kg) of iron ballast, while the centerboard-equipped version displaces 17,086 lb (7,750 kg) and carries 7,385 lb (3,350 kg) of iron ballast.

The keel-equipped version of the boat has a draft of 6.40 ft (1.95 m), while the centerboard-equipped version has a draft of 6.33 ft (1.93 m) with the centerboard extended and 4.25 ft (1.30 m) with it retracted, allowing operation in shallow water.

The boat is fitted with a British Perkins Engines diesel engine of 40 or 50 hp (30 or 37 kW) for docking and maneuvering. The fuel tank holds 39.6 U.S. gallons (150 L; 33.0 imp gal) and the fresh water tank has a capacity of 185 U.S. gallons (700 L; 154 imp gal).

The design has sleeping accommodation for nine people, with a double "V"-berth in the bow cabin, a U-shaped settee around a drop-down table and a straight settee in the main cabin and two aft cabins with a double berths. The galley is located on the port side just forward of the companionway ladder. The galley is U-shaped and is equipped with a two-burner stove, an ice box and a double sink. A navigation station is opposite the galley, on the starboard side. There are two heads, one just aft of the bow cabin on the port side and one on the starboard side in the aft cabin. Cabin headroom is 78 in (198 cm).

For sailing downwind the design may be equipped with a symmetrical spinnaker of 1,184 sq ft (110.0 m^{2}).

The design has a hull speed of 7.75 kn (14.35 km/h).

== Operational history ==
In 2012 the British publication Yachting Monthly used a Sun Fizz 40 in a series of survivability and crash tests.

== See also ==
- List of sailing boat types

Related development

- O'Day 39
