= Bangor Punta =

Defunct American conglomerate

Bangor Punta Corporation (traded on the NYSE under the symbol BNK) was an American conglomerate and Fortune 500 company in existence from 1964 to 1984. The corporation was a result of the merger of the Punta Alegre Sugar and Railroad Company, formerly of Cuba, and the Bangor and Aroostook Railroad of Maine. It owned a number of well-known companies in the general aviation, firearms and pleasure craft industries, including Cal Boats, O'Day Corp., Ranger Yachts, Piper Aircraft, Forjas Taurus, and Smith & Wesson. Headquartered in Greenwich, Connecticut, it was acquired by Lear Siegler, Inc. in 1984.

It also owned or controlled companies in agribusiness, energy systems, fashion fabrics, public security, process engineering, professional services and transportation.

The company's manufacturing unit was divested into a newly formed company, Envirotech, in 1969.
